= Hetzer =

German WWII tank destroyer (Jagdpanzer 38)

Jagdpanzer 38
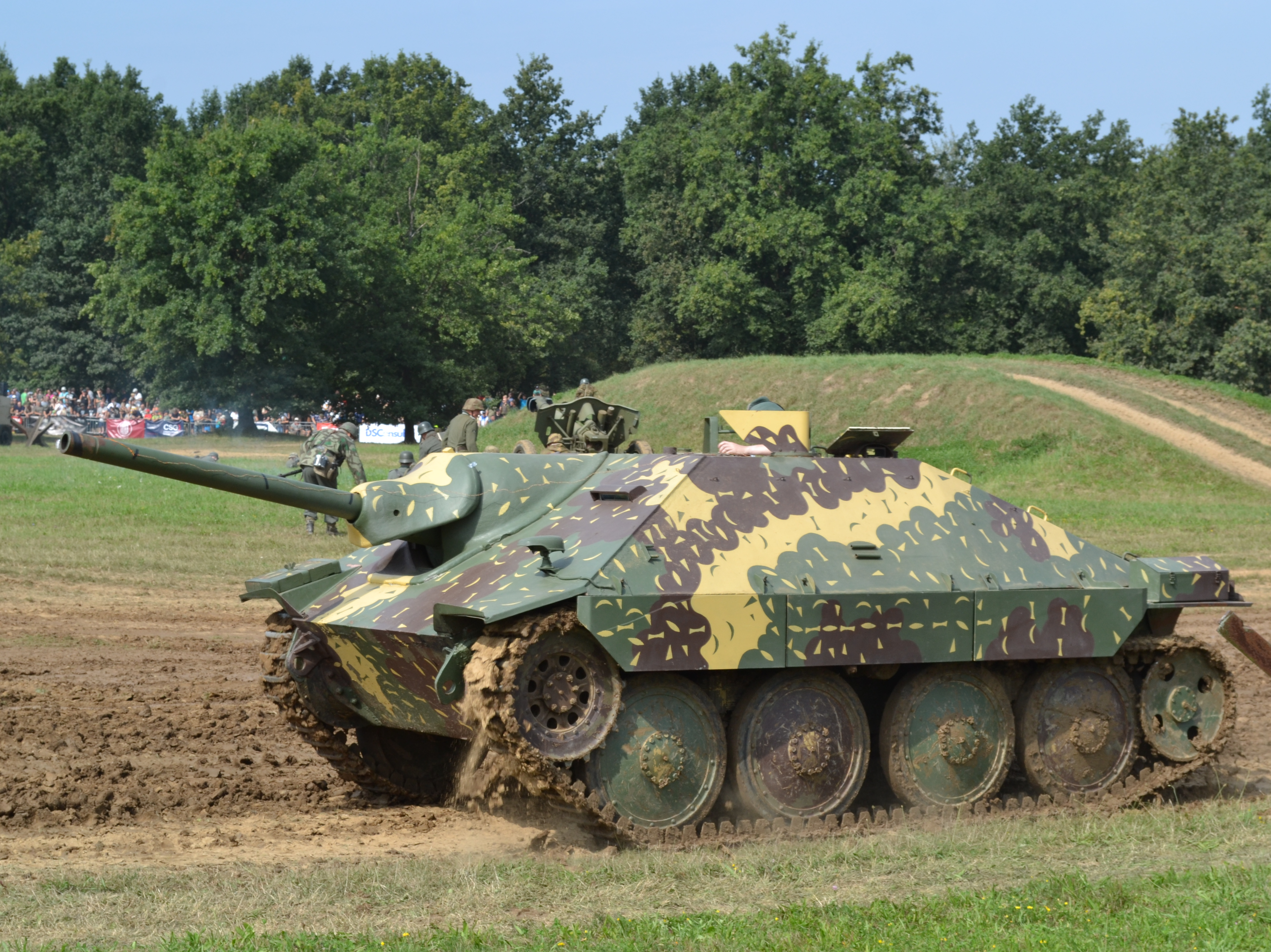
- Jagdpanzer 38 in museum at Lešany, Czech Republic
- Type: Light tank destroyer
- Place of origin: Nazi Germany, German-occupied Czechoslovakia

Service history
- In service: 1944–1945
- Used by: Nazi Germany; Hungary; Czechoslovakia (ST-I); Switzerland (G-13); Poland (three captured, one by AK, two by LWP); Romania (two captured)
- Wars: World War II

Production history
- Designer: BMM
- Designed: 1943
- Manufacturer: Böhmisch-Mährische Maschinenfabrik (ČKD), Škoda
- Produced: 4 March 1944 – 11 May 1945
- No. built: Approx. 2,827
- Variants: See Variants

Specifications
- Mass: 15.75 tonnes (34,722 lb)
- Length: 6.27 m (20 ft 7 in) (4.77 m (15 ft 8 in) excluding gun)
- Width: 2.63 m (8 ft 8 in)
- Height: 2.17 m (7 ft 1 in)
- Crew: 4
- Armor: 8-60 mm (0.31-2.36 in)
- Main armament: 1× 7.5 cm Pak 39 L/48; 41 rounds
- Secondary armament: 1× 7.92 mm MG 34 or MG 42 machine gun 1,200 rounds
- Engine: Praga 6-cylinder petrol, 7.8 litres 160 PS (158 hp, 118 kW) at 2,800 rpm
- Power/weight: 10.2 PS (7.5 kW) / tonne
- Transmission: 5 + 1 Praga-Wilson Typ CV
- Suspension: leaf spring
- Ground clearance: 38 cm (1 ft 3 in)
- Fuel capacity: 320 litres (85 US gal)
- Operational range: Road: 180 km (110 mi); Cross-country: 130 km (81 mi)
- Maximum speed: 42 km/h (26 mph)

The Jagdpanzer 38 (Sd.Kfz. 138/2), originally the Leichter Panzerjäger 38(t), known mostly post-war as Hetzer, was a German light tank destroyer of the Second World War based on a modified Czechoslovak Panzer 38(t) chassis.

German armoured forces in World War II created a variety of vehicles by mounting anti-tank guns on the chassis of obsolete tanks. These machines performed better than expected, but were still vulnerable due to their high vehicle profiles and open-topped turrets. Allied bombings took a heavy toll on German production facilities and further increased the need for an easily produced, yet effective light tank destroyer to replace vehicles like the StuG III and Marder series (Marder I, II, and III). Prototypes of the Jagdpanzer 38 were ready by 1944, and mass production began in April of that year. The Jagdpanzer 38 was covered entirely with sloped armour and possessed a compact form and low silhouette, giving it much improved defensive ability over other self-propelled guns. Armament consisted of a 7.5 cm Pak 39 L/48 gun and a remote-controlled MG 34. It featured a wide body to accommodate the four-man crew, as well as a strengthened lower hull with enlarged wheels, guide rollers, and tracks.

Jagdpanzer 38s first entered service in July 1944 and would eventually be assigned to a number of units, including infantry, Panzerjäger and Volksgrenadier divisions. The Jagdpanzer 38 equipped the Panzerjägerabteilungen (tank destroyer battalions) of the infantry divisions, giving them some limited mobile anti-armor capability. BMM and Škoda continually modified and improved the Jagdpanzer 38 during production of the more than 2,800 vehicles built. Owing to the ease of production and high operating rates, the Jagdpanzer 38 came to serve as Germany's main tank destroyer in the latter period of the war, making an important contribution on both the Eastern and Western Fronts.

== Name ==
The name Hetzer (German for "chaser") was never an official or suggestive name used for this vehicle. It was the designation for another prototype, the E-10 of the Entwicklung series which was supposed to replace all German tanks with more standardized counterparts, including the Jagdpanzer 38 which was still in development. The Škoda factory, for a short period, mistook Hetzer as the new name for the Jagdpanzer 38 in its documentation. Thus the first unit equipped with the vehicle applied the incorrect name for a few weeks until matters were clarified. Subsequently, the vehicle was rarely called Hetzer by its units, but the name did not disappear completely; examples of usages e.g. in Wehrmacht Reports were found until the end of the war. Most notably, there exists a briefing paper from Heinz Guderian to Hitler saying that the unofficial name Hetzer had spontaneously been coined by the troops. Post-war historians basing themselves on this statement made the name popular in their works.

== Development ==
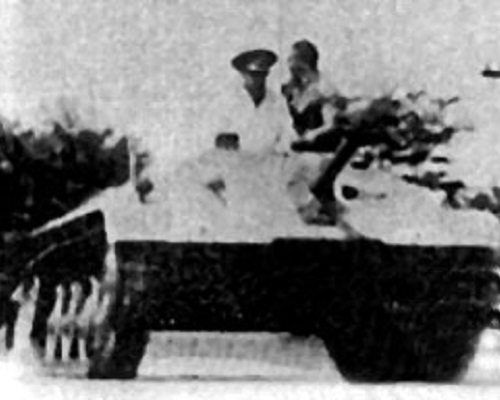
The Romanian Mareșal tank destroyer, credited with having inspired the Jagdpanzer 38

When Alketts factory for production of Sturmgeschütz III was bombed and damaged during a raid on Berlin, on 26 November 1943, it become necessary to find alternatives. Boehmisch-Mährische Machinenfabrik was considered but it could not produce the heavy chassis of the Sturmgeschütz and it was decided to base a new design on the Panzer 38(t) which they already produced. On 17 December the design drawings for the new vehicle was presented and by 24 January 1944 a wooden mock-up was ready.

The design of the Jagdpanzer 38 was influenced by that of the Romanian Mareșal tank destroyer, whose development had started in late 1942, according to contemporary Romanian documents and later works of authors such as Steven Zaloga and Mark Axworthy. This was acknowledged by two German officials: Alkett engineer Wohlrath and Lieutenant-Colonel Ventz. The Germans were pleased by the Mareșal and a mixed production of the two tank destroyers was planned, which never took place due to Romania being overrun by the Red Army. Hilary Doyle and Walter Spielberger do not directly mention a connection between the two vehicles but write how in December 1943—the time the Jagdpanzer 38 was being designed—Hitler is known to have already been aware of the Mareșal, which he "extraordinarily liked".

The new Sturmgeschütz was built on the Panzer 38(t)'s widened and lengthened chassis with modified suspension (larger road-wheels from the Praga TNH n. a prototype reconnaissance tank) and up-rated engine. The new engine was a 160 PS Praga AC/2 6-cylinder engine coupled to a Praga-Wilson gearbox (5 forward and 1 reverse gear). The chassis was modified to accommodate a larger gun and thicker armour than the Panzer 38(t) tank. Its combat mass was 16 tonnes (versus 9.8-tonnes for the Pz 38(t)) and it could travel at a maximum speed of 42 km/h (26 mph). It had a sloped armour front plate of 60 mm sloped back at 60 degrees from the vertical — equivalent in protection to about 120 mm (4.7 in), carried a reasonably powerful 75 mm gun, was mechanically reliable, small and easily concealed. It was also cheap to build.

The Jagdpanzer 38 succeeded the open-top Marder III (based on the same chassis). Starting from April 1944, about 2,584 were built until the end of the war. The older Marder III Panzerjäger series retained the same vertically sided chassis as Panzer 38(t). In the Jagdpanzer 38, the lower hull sides slope 15 degrees outward to make a roughly hexagonal shape when viewed from front or rear. This increased the interior space and enabled an enclosed casemate-style fighting compartment. Because of the enclosed armour, it was 5 tonnes heavier than the Marder III. To compensate for the increased weight, track width was increased from 293 mm to 350 mm.

=== Production ===
The initial production Jagdpanzer 38 did not sit even with the ground because the gun, transmission and thicker frontal armour weighed the front down. The leaf springs were strengthened from June 1944, which levelled the vehicle. From May to July 1944, accessibility was improved by adding hatches: the commander's smaller hatch opening to the rear, one in the right rear corner for radiator access and one in the left rear corner for fuel tank access. From August 1944, lighter inner and outer mantlets reduced the weight by 200 kg (440 lb). These were more conical than the half cone shaped initial mantlets. Also from August 1944, new rear idler wheels were introduced that had 8, 6, and 4 (not necessarily in that order) lightening holes instead of 12, that simplified manufacture. In September 1944, the front 16 spring leaves were increased in thickness to 9 mm (0.35 in) per leaf (the rear 16 remained 7 mm thick). Also in September, the side Schürzen's front and rear tips were bent inward to prevent them from catching bushes and being torn off. It was discovered that the driver's periscope housing acted as a shot trap, preventing incoming shells from bouncing off the front glacis.

The protruding housing was removed, instead the periscope was inserted into vertical cuts to the front armour from October 1944. Also from October 1944, a flame reducing muffler was introduced, which reduced visibility and backfiring. A head cushion was added to the commander's hatch from October 1944. At the same time, the road wheel rims were riveted instead of bolted. To cope with the heavy front, and the necessity to traverse the vehicle to aim, the gear ratio was lowered from 1:7.33 to 1:8 to reduce the stress on final gears from January 1945. A buttoned-down Jagdpanzer 38 was blind to its right side. Since 20 mm (0.79 in) side armour (same as late model Panzer II's side armour) was adequate to protect the crew only from fairly small-calibre guns, it was important to face the threat frontally. Hence, the commander's field of view was planned to be improved by installing a rotating periscope in the Jagdpanzer 38 Starr, just as the Sturmgeschutz III and Elefant had evolved from a pair of periscopes to all around vision blocks. The Jagdpanzer 38 Starr came too late to see action.

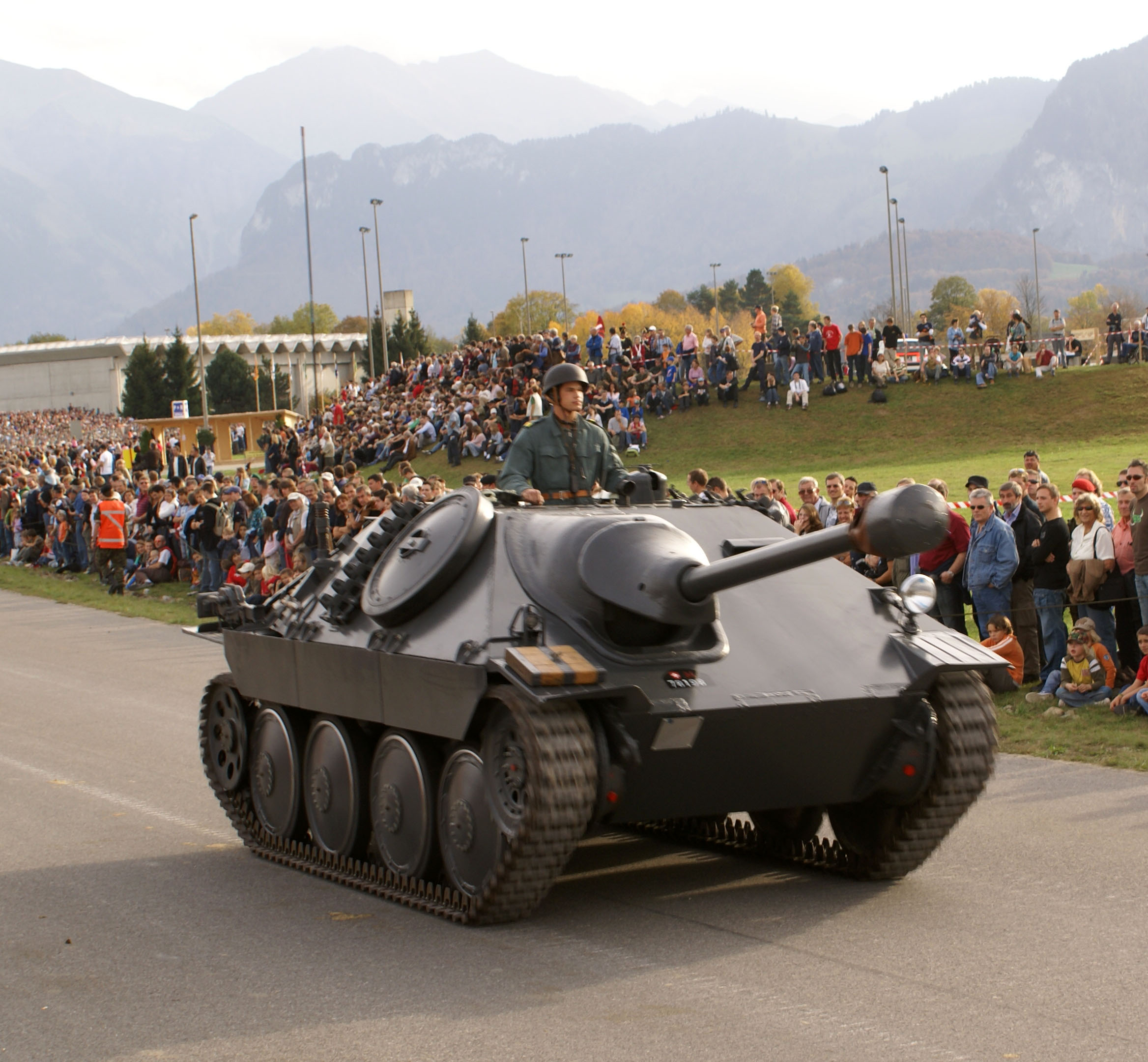
Swiss Army G-13

By order of Adolf Hitler in November 1944, a number of Jagdpanzer 38s were refurbished straight from the factory with a Koebe flamethrower and accompanying equipment instead of the normal gun. The flame projector, encased in a metal shield reminiscent of that of a gun barrel, was very prone to damage. Fewer than 50 of these vehicles, called Flammpanzer 38, were completed before the end of the war but they were used operationally against Allied forces on the Western Front. After the war, Czechoslovakia continued to build the type (versions ST-I and ST-III for training version, about 180 units built) and exported 158 vehicles (version G-13) to Switzerland. Most vehicles in today's collections are of Swiss origin.

Further variants were a Jagdpanzer 38 carrying the 150 mm sIG 33/2 howitzer, of which 30 were produced before the end of the war, and the Bergepanzer 38, a light recovery vehicle of which 170 were produced. Plans were made to produce other variants, including an assault gun version of the Jagdpanzer 38 carrying a 105 mm StuH 42 main gun, a version mounting the 7.5 cm KwK 42 L/70 gun from the Panther, and an anti-aircraft variant mounted with a Flak turret. The war ended before these proposed models were put into production. Prototypes were also developed for the Jagdpanzer 38 Starr, a simplified version of the Jagdpanzer 38 and also a step towards the E-10. The design removed the recoil absorber from the main 7.5 cm Pak 39 gun, instead attaching the gun to the chassis, and using the Jagdpanzer 38's bulk and suspension to absorb the recoil. Three prototypes were built as were eleven pre-production vehicles, of which one was fitted with a diesel engine. Hitler ordered the one prototype committed to combat to be destroyed rather than let it be captured on 31 March 1945. The army requested on 29 April that the gun sights and traversing gear from the nine pre-production vehicles at the Milowitz proving ground, which it deemed not combat worthy, be removed and sent back to the factory to allow combat-ready vehicles to be completed.

=== Variants ===
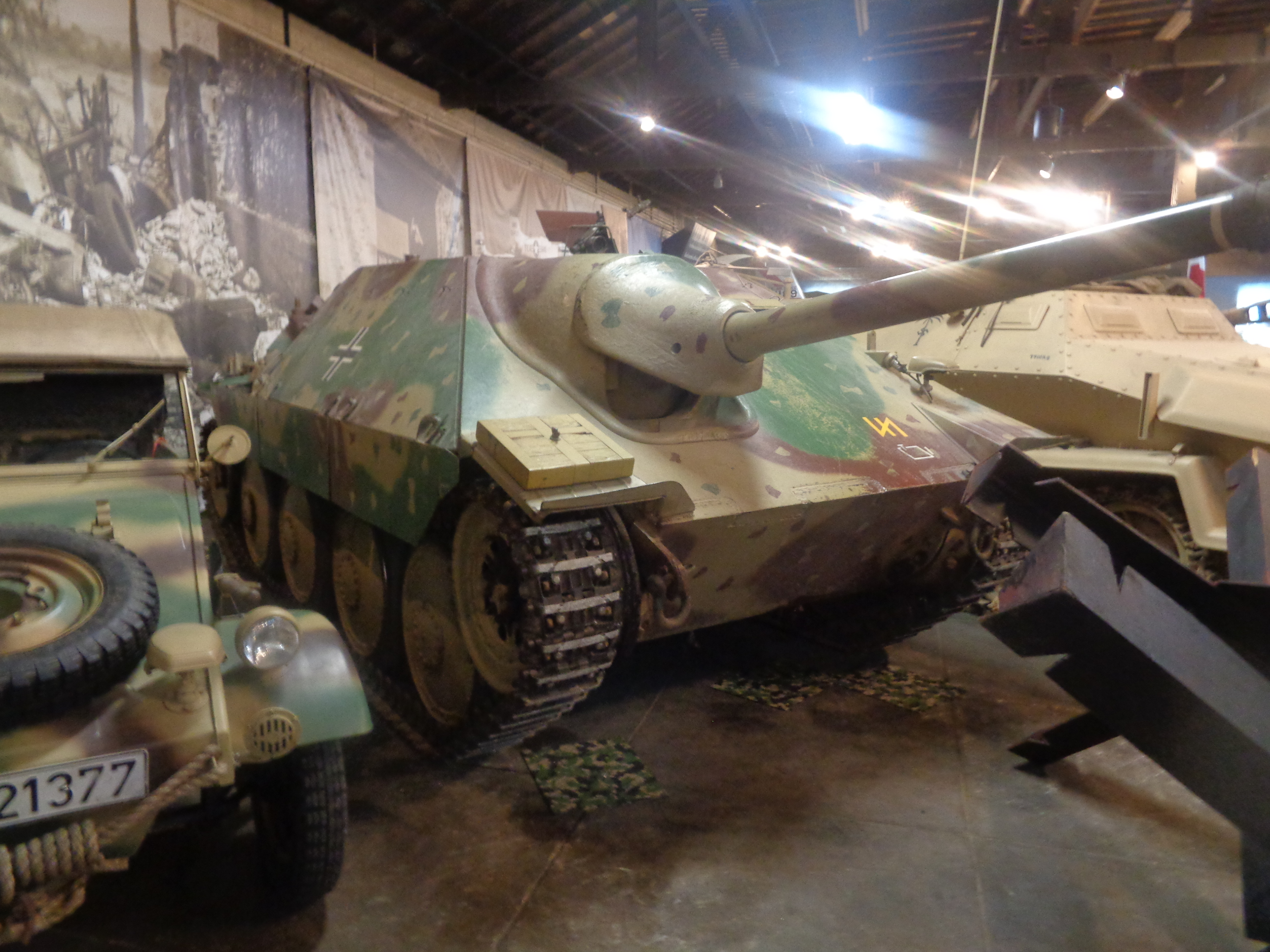
Jagdpanzer 38, exhibited in the Texas Military Forces Museum in Austin, USA.

- Befehlswagen 38 - Command variant. Fitted with a 30W FuG 8 radio set.
- Flammpanzer 38 - Jagdpanzer 38 modified with a Koebe flamethrower in place of the main gun. Deployed on the Western Front, with first use during the Battle of the Bulge (20 in 352nd and 353rd Panzer-Flamm-Kompanies attached to Army Group G). Less than 50 units were produced.
- Panzerjäger 38(t) mit 75mm L/70 - Prototype version experimenting with mounting the 7.5cm KwK 42 L/70 gun from the Panther. 3 prototypes built, but the long gun and extra weight caused even bigger problems driving the vehicles. A proposal by Krupp to modify the Jagdpanzer 38 with a superstructure to the rear to mount the gun, but no more development was done on this idea.
- Jagdpanzer 38 Starr - A simplified version of the Jagdpanzer 38, which attached the 7.5cm Pak 39 gun to the chassis, fitted with a Tatra diesel engine. 10 were built, 9 converted back to normal Jagdpanzer 38. The remaining prototype was destroyed at the end of the war.
- Panzerjäger 38(t) mit 105mm StuH 42/2 L/28 - A proposed version of the Jagdpanzer 38 Starr armed with a 10.5 cm howitzer.
- ST-I - Post-war Czech designation for new manufactured or repaired Jagdpanzer 38. 249 in service, together with 50 ST-III/CVP driver training vehicles (Unarmed chassis, some with a superstructure). Prototype developments included the Praga VT-III armoured recovery vehicle and PM-I flamethrower tank.
- PM1 - Prototype ST-I variant armed with a flamethrower and machinegun. Only 3 were built between 1949 and 1956

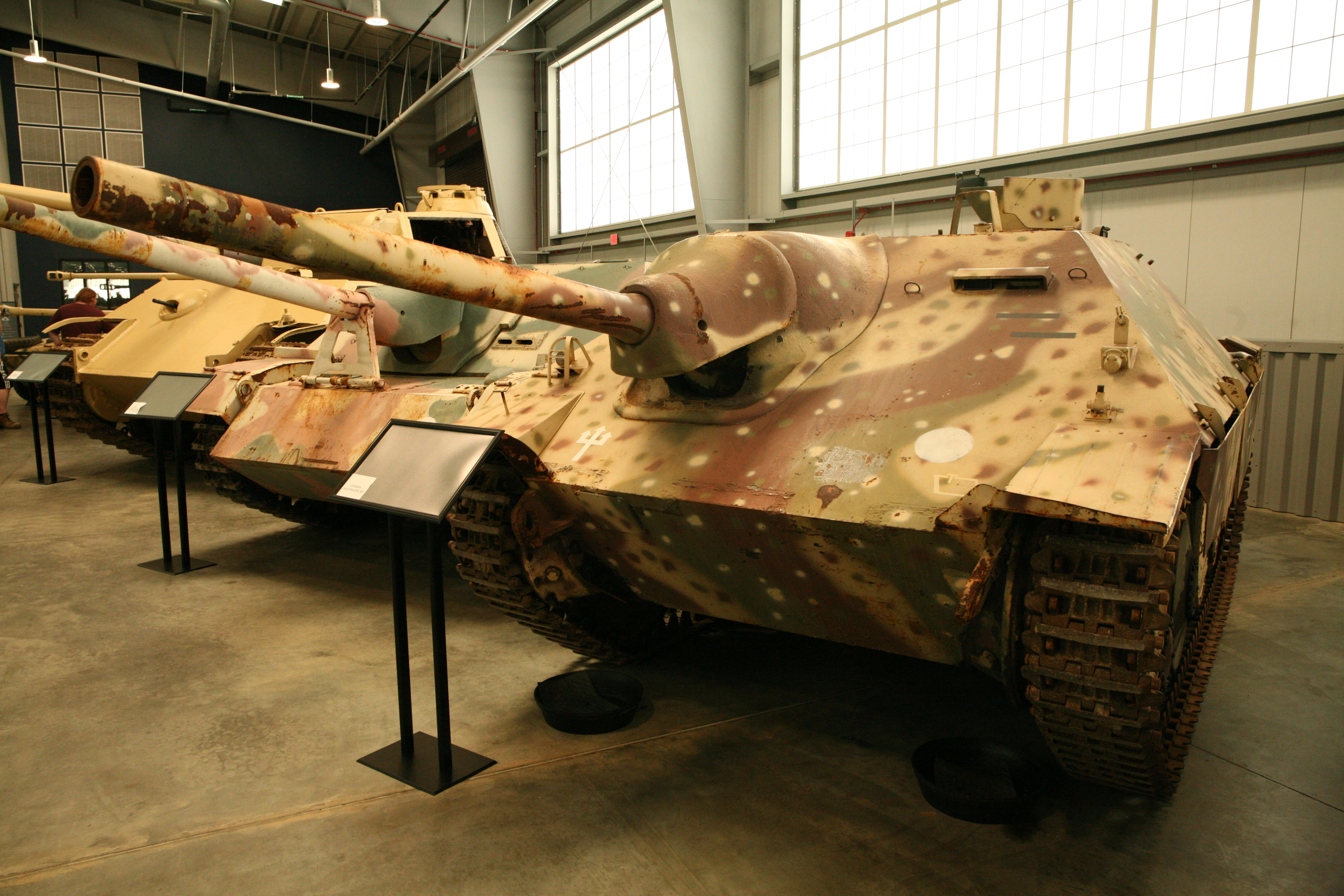
A former Swiss G-13 in German camouflage at the U.S. Army Armor & Cavalry Collection, Fort Benning

- G13 - Post war version of the Jagdpanzer 38 built for Switzerland, armed with a StuK 40 gun.

=== Designs based on chassis ===
- Bergepanzer 38 - A light recovery vehicle, issued to units along with the Jagdpanzer 38. 170 units produced. A prototype was developed to fit the design with a 2cm Flak 38.
- 15 cm Schweres Infanteriegeschütz 33/2 (Sf) auf Jagdpanzer 38 - This self-propelled assault gun was developed using the hull of the Bergepanzer 38(t) recovery vehicle with a 15 cm sIG 33/2 mounted in a lightly armoured casemate; the vehicle's enclosed firing compartment was protected by 10 mm of armoured plate on the front and flanks. Developed by BMM in Prague and intended as a replacement for the battlefield attrition in Grille self-propelled howitzers. Some sources indicated a high probability that the gun was produced at the Alkett plant in Berlin-Marienfelde. 30 built between December 1944 and February 1945.
- Vollkettenaufklärer 38 - Reconnaissance vehicle based on the Bergepanzer 38. Several prototypes tested, mounting single or twin 2cm Flak 38, and in one case a 7.5 cm K51 L/24 gun.
- Vollkettenaufklärer 38 Kätzchen - A fully tracked reconnaissance vehicle based on the Jagdpanzer} 38. Prototypes were built by BMM and ordered into production, but never built. The prototypes were believed to have been destroyed before the end of the war.
- Flakpanzer 38 Kugelblitz - A proposal to mount the turret from a Flakpanzer IV Kugelblitz on a Jagdpanzer 38 chassis. No production due to the war situation.
- Panzerjäger 38 with Panzer IV turret - a Krupp proposal to mount the turret of a Panzer IV with a 7.5 cm KwK 40 or 8 cm PAW 600 gun on the chassis of Panzerjäger 38. The proposal was not pursued.
- Jagdpanzer 38 D - A larger version of the Panzerjager 38(t); prototype only, though mass production was planned.

== Performance ==
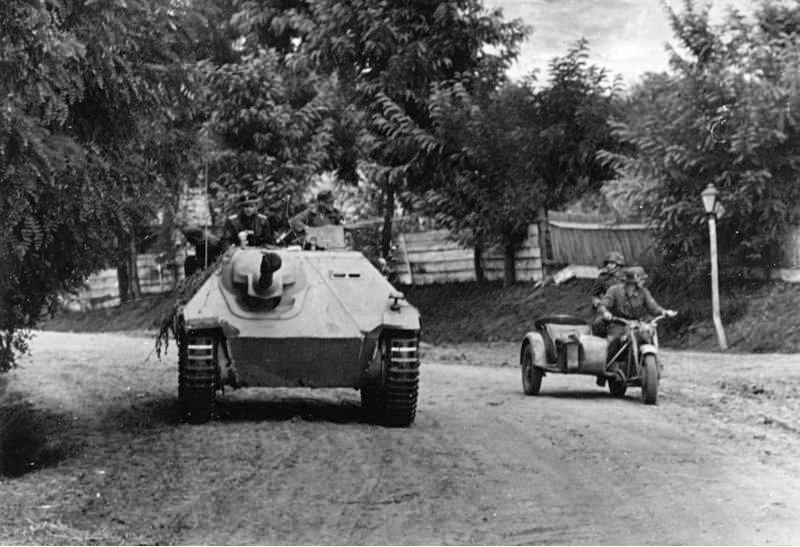
Jagdpanzer 38 of 8th SS Cavalry Division Florian Geyer, Hungary, 1944

The Jagdpanzer 38 fitted into the lighter category of German tank destroyers that began with the Panzerjäger I, continued with the Marder series, and ended with the Jagdpanzer 38. The 75 mm Pak 39 L/48 gun of the Jagdpanzer 38 was a modified version of the 75 mm StuK 40 L/48 used in the StuG III and StuG IV assault guns. With this gun, the Jagdpanzer 38 was able to destroy nearly all Allied or Soviet tank types in service at long ranges (except heavy tanks), and its fully enclosed armour protection made it a safer vehicle to crew than the open-topped Marder II or Marder III series.

The vehicle could carry two different armour-piercing shells for the Pak 39 gun: the Pzgr. 40 high-velocity tungsten cored round, which fired a 4.1 kg (9.0 lb) projectile at 930 m/s that could penetrate 120 mm of armour at 500 meters and 97 mm at 1,000 meters, striking at a 30-degree angle, but was often in scarce supply; and the Pzgr. 39 armour-piercing, capped, ballistic capped shell (APCBC) with explosive filler and a tracer element, launching a heavier 6.8 kg (15 lb) projectile at 750 m/s that could pierce 106 mm (4.2 in) of armour at 500 meters and 95 mm at 1,000 meters. Based on tests using Pzgr. 39 ammunition, with correct range estimation and competent gunnery, a 99% chance of a first-shot hit at 500 m and a 71% chance at 1,000 m was estimated. The vehicle also carried standard high-explosive rounds and the Gr. 38 HL/C high-explosive anti-tank (HEAT) round designed with a shaped charge, but this was less effective and accurate against armoured targets than AP rounds.

The Jagdpanzer 38 was one of the most common late-war German tank destroyers. It was available in relatively large numbers and was generally mechanically reliable. Like some other late-war German SPGs, the Jagdpanzer 38 mounted a remote-control machine gun mount that could be fired from within the vehicle. This proved popular with crews, though to reload the gun, a crewmember needed to expose himself to enemy fire.

The vehicle's small size made it easier to conceal than larger vehicles. A self-propelled gun such as this was not intended for a mobile, meeting engagement or the typical Wehrmacht blitzkrieg style of warfare. Instead, a light self-propelled gun like the Jagdpanzer 38 excelled when emplaced along pre-determined lines of sight where the enemy was expected to approach and when used in defensive positions to support a prepared ambush. The Jagdpanzer 38 is similar in its dimensions and vertical profile to the minuscule and undergunned Panzer II, a prewar tank. However, by 1944, the majority of tanks were much larger and heavier; a Jagdpanzer 38 waiting motionless in an ambush position was a much smaller target to detect and hit than many other armoured fighting vehicles of the time. Its main failings were comparatively thin side armour, limited ammunition storage, poor gun traverse, and a poor internal layout that made operating the vehicle difficult, as well as leaf springs and drive wheels that were prone to failure due to the increased weight. Using the Jagdpanzer 38 and similar vehicles according to a defensive doctrine would offset some of the disadvantages of poor side armour and limited gun traverse.

== Operational history ==
Nazi Germany
The Jagdpanzer 38 first entered service with the Heeres Panzerjäger-Abteilung 731 in July 1944. This unit was sent to Army Group North on the Eastern Front. One report from the Eastern Front described how a company of Jagdpanzer 38 destroyed 20 enemy tanks without any losses.
Kingdom of Hungary
75 Jagdpanzer 38s were used by the Royal Hungarian Army.
Kingdom of Romania
After King Michael's Coup in 1944, Romania had captured two Hetzers and had used them for a while before they were confiscated by the Red Army. While Romania was still an Axis power, Germany had decided to give them 15 Jagdpanzer 38s. In the meantime, the Royal Coup had happened, so Romania never received the vehicles. As part of a proposed joint production of the Mareșal and Jagdpanzer 38, Germany even gave Romania the licence to produce the Jagdpanzer 38. It's not known whether any examples were produced in Romania.

Polish Underground State / Provisional Government of National Unity
One captured by the Home Army, nicknamed Chwat ("daredevil"), during the Warsaw Uprising. At least two captured vehicles, used by the Polish People's Army, post-war.
Third Czechoslovak Republic / Czechoslovak Socialist Republic
249 vehicles of the ST-I variant were used.
Switzerland
158 vehicles of the G-13 version were used.

== Survivors ==
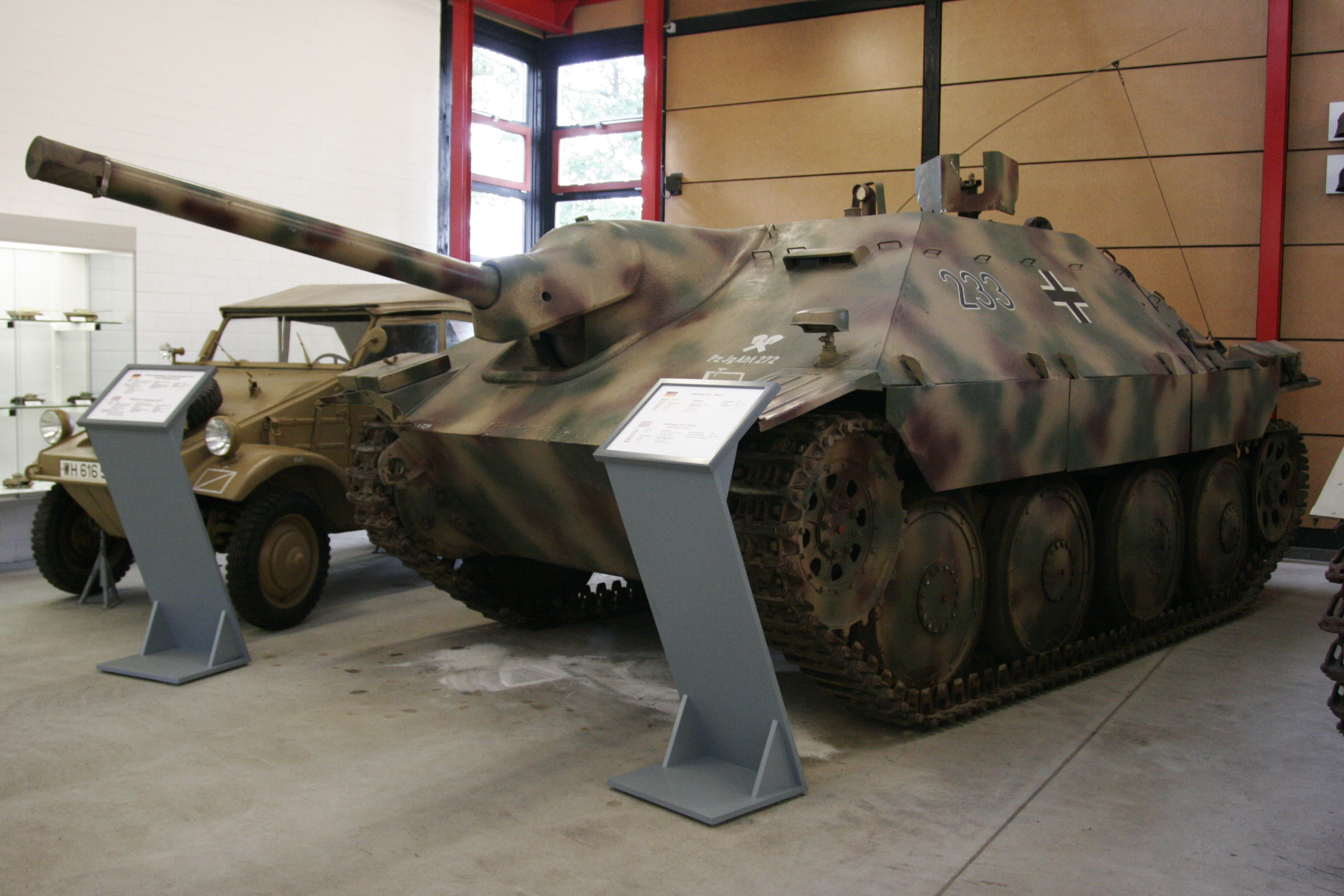
Jagdpanzer 38 on display at the Deutsches Panzermuseum Munster, Germany

Due to the large number produced, the Jagdpanzer 38 is probably the most abundant World War II German tank destroyer remaining today, though many survivors are actually post-war Swiss G-13 and Czech ST-I variants. In addition to the numerous examples in museums, there are Jagdpanzer 38s of various conditions in private collections. In 2007, a Jagdpanzer 38 was recovered from the Baltic Sea in Jurata, Poland. As of 2012, it was being restored in Gdańsk.

== See also ==
- Mareșal
- M18 Hellcat
- Jagdpanther
- Jagdpanzer IV
- Sturmgeschütz III
- Sturmgeschütz IV
- SU-85

== Bibliography ==
- Axworthy, Mark; Scafes, Cornel; Craciunoiu, Cristian (1995). Third Axis Fourth Ally: Romanian Armed Forces in the European War, 1941-1945. London: Arms & Armour. ISBN 1-85409-267-7.
- Chamberlain, Peter; Doyle, Hilary (1993). Encyclopedia of German Tanks of World War Two: A Complete Illustrated Directory of German Battle Tanks, Armoured Cars, Self-Propelled Guns and Semi-Tracked Vehicles, 1933–1945 (revised ed.). London: Arms and Armour. ISBN 1-85409-214-6.
- Doyle, Hilary; Jentz, Tom (2001). Jagdpanzer 38 'Hetzer' 1944-45. Oxford, UK: Osprey Publishing. ISBN 1-84176-135-4.
- Gil-Martínez, Eduardo M. (20 September 2018). Romanian Armored Forces in World War II. Lublin, Poland: Kagero. ISBN 978-8395157530.
- Kliment, Charles K.; Francev, Vladimír (1997). Czechoslovak Armored Fighting Vehicles 1918-1948. Atlgen, Pennsylvania: Schiffer Publishing. ISBN 0-7643-0141-1.
- Scafeș, Cornel (2004). "Buletinul Muzeului Național Militar, Nr. 2/2004" [Bulletin of the National Military Museum, No. 2/2004]. National Military Museum (in Romanian). Bucharest: Total Publishing: 210–237.
- Scafeș, Cornel; Șerbănescu, Horia Vl.; Scafeș, Ioan I. (2011) [2005]. Trupele blindate din Armata Română (1919–1947) [Armored Troops of the Romanian Army (1919–1947)] (in Romanian). Bucharest: Alpha MDN. ISBN 9789731390741.
- Skotnicki, Mariusz (November 2002). "Ciężkie działo piechoty sIG 33 - Wersje samobieżne". Nowa Technika Wojskowa (11): 34.
- Spielberger, Walter J.; Doyle, Hilary Louis (2007) [1977]. Special Panzer Variants: Development • Production • Operations. Atglen, Pennsylvania, USA: Schiffer Publishing. ISBN 978-0764326226.
- Spielberger, Walter; Jentz, Tom (2007). German Light Jagdpanzer: Development - Production - Operations. Atglen, Pennsylvania: Schiffer Publishing. ISBN 978-0-7643-2623-3.
- Zaloga, Steven J. (2013). Tanks of Hitler's Eastern Allies 1941-45. Oxford, UK: Osprey Publishing. ISBN 978-1-78096-020-3.
