= 7.5 cm KwK 40 =

German tank gun and anti-tank gun

7,5 cm KwK 40 (L/48)
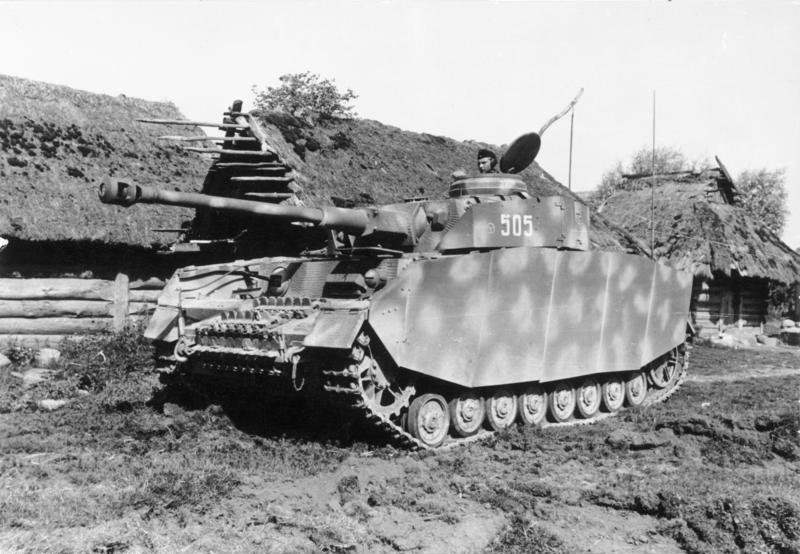
- 7.5 cm KwK 40 L/48 on a Panzer IV Ausf. H
- Type: Tank gun
- Place of origin: Nazi Germany

Service history
- Used by: Nazi Germany
- Wars: World War II

Production history
- Designer: Rheinmetall-Borsig AG
- Manufacturer: Rheinmetall-Borsig AG
- Unit cost: 13500 RM
- Produced: 1942-45

Specifications
- Mass: 750 kg (1,650 lb)
- Barrel length: 361.5 cm (11 ft 10.3 in) bore (48 calibers)
- Shell: Fixed QF 75×495mm R
- Caliber: 75 mm (2.95 in)
- Elevation: -10° to +20°
- Rate of fire: 10–15 round per minute
- Muzzle velocity: 750 m/s (2,500 ft/s)
- Maximum firing range: 7,700 m (8,400 yd)

The 7.5 cm KwK 40 (7.5 cm Kampfwagenkanone (Note: "fighting vehicle gun") 40) was a German 75 mm Second World War era vehicle-mounted gun, used as the primary armament of the German Panzer IV (F2 model onwards) medium tank and the Sturmgeschütz III (F model onwards) and Sturmgeschütz IV assault guns which were used as tank destroyers.

The design of the KwK 40 was adapted from the similar towed anti-tank gun, the 7.5 cm Pak 40. It replaced the 7.5 cm KwK 37 with its 24-calibre barrel, providing a huge improvement in firepower for mid-war tank designs. It came in two versions, 43 ("L/43") and 48 ("L/48") calibres long barrels, the former used during 1942 and early 1943, and the latter after that point. Along with the Pak 40, the KwK 40/StuK 40 was the most numerous anti-tank gun of the German army, and remained an effective weapon until the war's end.

== History ==
When mounted on a casemate-armored assault gun-designated vehicle (Sturmgeschütz) instead of a turreted tank, the weapon was called Sturmkanone 40 (StuK 40). Both the KwK 40 and StuK 40 were developed from the towed 7.5 cm Pak 40 anti-tank gun. The length of the ammunition used was shortened to allow for easier storage of said ammunition in vehicles the KwK 40 and StuK 40 would be mounted on.

The KwK 40 L/43 was mounted on the Panzer IV from April 1942 until June 1943. All 225 vehicles of the Panzer IV F2 mounted the L/43 with a ball shaped muzzle brake. About a 1,000 out of the 1,687 vehicles of the Panzer IV Ausf. G mounted the L/43 with a double baffle muzzle brake. The StuG III with the L/43 gun was designated as Ausf. F. of which only 120 were equipped with the L/43 (the remaining 246 having the longer L/48 version). All StuG III production runs through Ausf. F/8 to G mounted the longer L/48. The 780 original Jagdpanzer IV tank destroyers mounted the Pak 39 variant of the L/48 gun, the later Panzer IV/70 mounted the even longer Panther-derived StuK 42 L/70.

The L/48 was 334 mm (13.1 inches) longer and slightly more powerful than the L/43. L/48 became the standard gun from June 1942 until the end of World War II. The gun was fitted with an electric firing mechanism and the breech operated semi-automatically. Only one-piece ammunition was used.

Following number of vehicles mounted L/48 version from June 1942-April 1945

- Approximately 6,000 Panzer IV Ausf. G, H, J
- 7,720 vehicles of StuG III Ausf. G + 246 of Ausf.F + 250 vehicles of StuG III Ausf. F/8
- All 1,139 vehicles of StuG IV
- 780 Jagdpanzer IV

As with the 7.5 cm Pak 40, the muzzle brake of the KwK 40 and StuK 40 went through a series of design changes. Five types of muzzle brakes were used, gradually increasing the area of exposure to the blast. The designs progressed from tubular type double baffle muzzle brakes to single baffle ball shape muzzle brakes, which proved to be insufficient in reducing recoil, followed by a double flange type from May 1943. The front flange and rear disk type was used from March 1944, followed finally by the double disc type.

== Ammunition ==
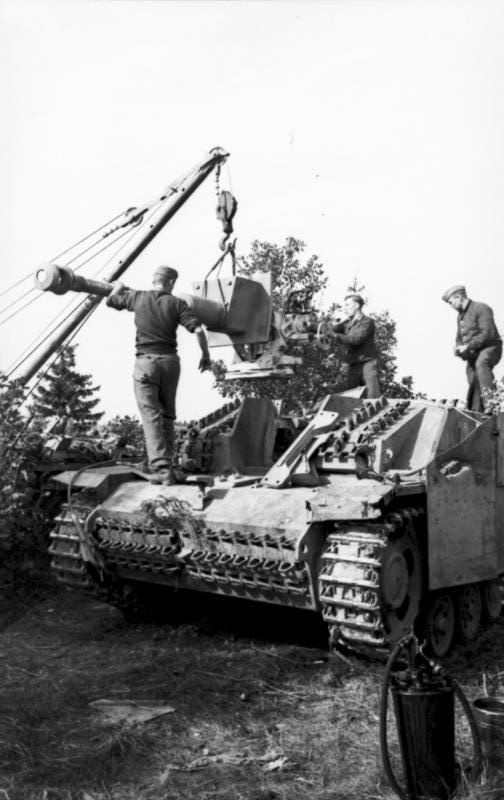
Gun maintenance on a Sturmgeschütz III.

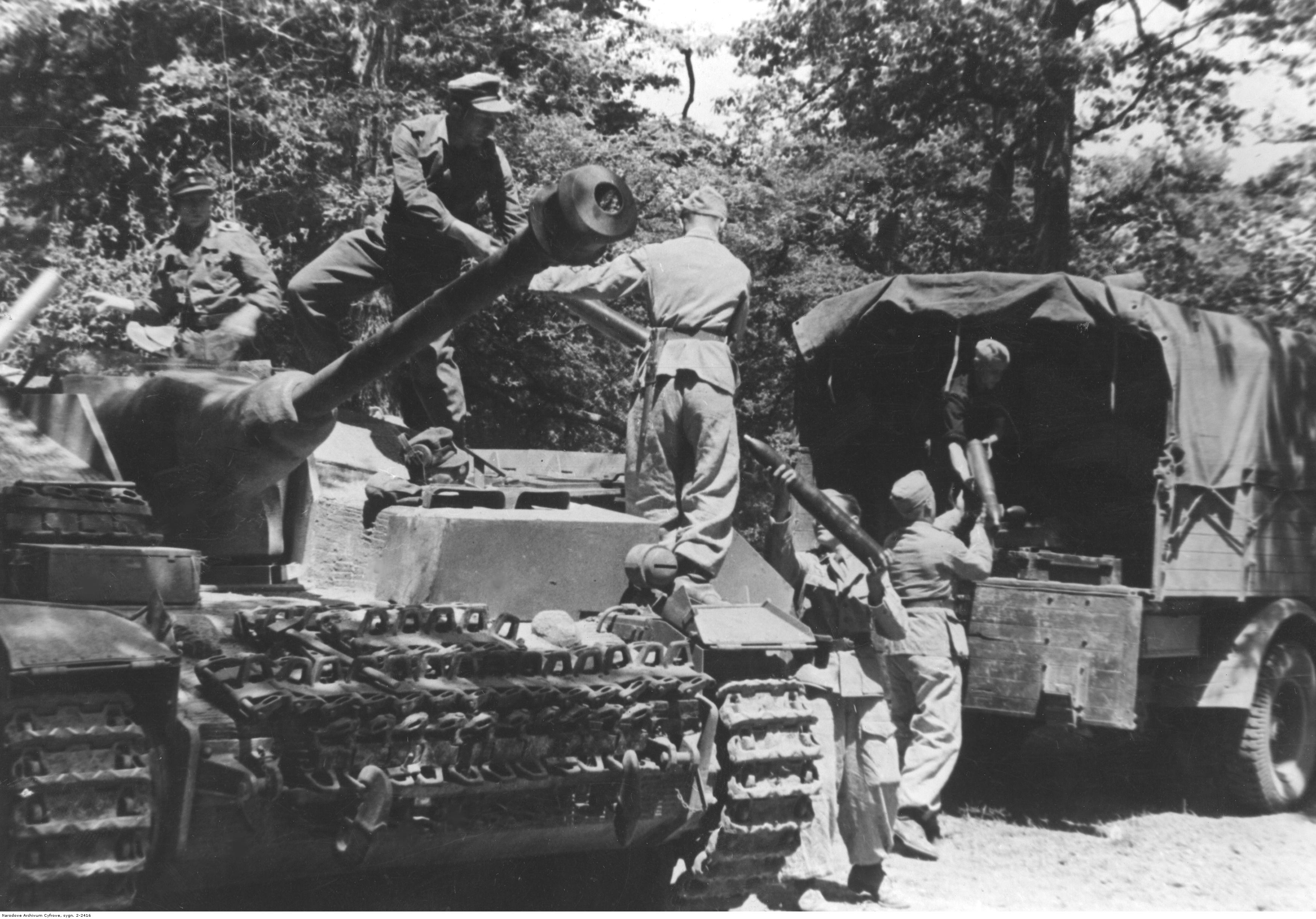
Ammunition is loaded on a Sturmgeschütz IV in 1944.

KwK 40 used one piece ammuntion 75×495 mm R cartridge with electric primer, model C/22 or C/22 St.

- Pzgr. Patr. 39 KwK 40 (Armour-piercing, capped, ballistic capped shell (APCBC) High Explosive round
- Pzgr. Patr. 40 KwK 40 (Armour Piercing Composite Rigid)
- Gr. Patr. 38 HL/B KwK 40 (High-explosive anti-tank)
- Gr. Patr. 38 HL/C KwK 40 (High explosive anti-tank)
- 7.5 cm Sprgr.Patr.34 KwK 40 (High Explosive) L/48

Ammunition
	Muzzle velocity	Projectile weight	Explosive filler	Fuze	Propelling charge	Complete round weight
Pzgr. Patr. 39 KwK 40	750 m/s (2,500 ft/s)	6.8 kg (15 lb)	18 g (0.63 oz) of RDX/wax	BdZ 5103 or BdZ 5103* base fuze	2.41 kg (5.3 lb) of Digl. R.P. G1	11.52 kg (25.4 lb)
Pzgr. Patr. 40 KwK 40	930 m/s (3,100 ft/s)	4.1 kg (9.0 lb)	none	none	2.2 kg (4.9 lb) of Gu. R.P. 7,7	8.61 kg (19 lb 0 oz)
Gr. Patr. 38 HL/B KwK 40	450 m/s (1,500 ft/s)	5 kg (11 lb)	0.51 kg (1.1 lb) of RDX/wax	A.Z. 38 St	0.43 kg (0.95 lb) of Gu. Bl. P.-AO	7.36 kg (16.2 lb)
7.5 cm Sprgr.Patr.34	550 m/s (1,800 ft/s)	9.75 lb (4.42 kg)	1.422 lb (0.645 kg) of Amatol	kl. A.Z. 23 (0,15) umg. nose fuze	0.755 kg (1.66 lb) of Gu. Bl. P.-AO	8.71 kg (19.2 lb)

== Performance ==
Penetration of armor plate inclined at 30 degrees from vertical
Gun type	Barrel length	Ammunition type	Muzzle velocity	Penetration				
Gun type	Barrel length	Ammunition type	Muzzle velocity	100 m (110 yd)	500 m (550 yd)	1,000 m (1,100 yd)	1,500 m (1,600 yd)	2,000 m (2,200 yd)
7.5 cm KwK 37 L/24	1,762.5 mm (5 ft 9.39 in)	K.Gr.Patr.rot.Pz	385 m/s (1,260 ft/s)	41 mm (1.6 in)	39 mm (1.5 in)	35 mm (1.4 in)	33 mm (1.3 in)	30 mm (1.2 in)
7.5 cm StuK 40 L/43	3,281 mm (10 ft 9.2 in)	Pzgr.Ptr.39	740 m/s (2,400 ft/s)	98 mm (3.9 in)	91 mm (3.6 in)	82 mm (3.2 in)	72 mm (2.8 in)	63 mm (2.5 in)
7.5 cm KwK 40 L/48	3,615 mm (11 ft 10.3 in)	Pzgr.Ptr.39	750 m/s (2,500 ft/s)	106 mm (4.2 in)	96 mm (3.8 in)	85 mm (3.3 in)	74 mm (2.9 in)	64 mm (2.5 in)
7.5 cm KwK 40 L/48	3,615 mm (11 ft 10.3 in)	Pzgr.Ptr.40	930 m/s (3,100 ft/s)	143 mm (5.6 in)	120 mm (4.7 in)	97 mm (3.8 in)	77 mm (3.0 in)	
7.5 cm KwK 40 L/48	3,615 mm (11 ft 10.3 in)	Gr. 38 HL/C	450 m/s (1,500 ft/s)	100 mm (3.9 in)	100 mm (3.9 in)	100 mm (3.9 in)	100 mm (3.9 in)	100 mm (3.9 in)

Calculated penetration figures (90 degrees, American and British 50% success criteria), for comparison to others guns.
Gun type	Ammunition type	Muzzle velocity	Penetration									
Gun type	Ammunition type	Muzzle velocity	100 m (110 yd)	250 m (270 yd)	500 m (550 yd)	750 m (820 yd)	1,000 m (1,100 yd)	1,250 m (1,370 yd)	1,500 m (1,600 yd)	2,000 m (2,200 yd)	2,500 m (2,700 yd)	3,000 m (3,300 yd)
7.5 cm StuK 40 L/43	APCBC	740 m/s (2,400 ft/s)	133 mm (5.2 in)	128 mm (5.0 in)	121 mm (4.8 in)	114 mm (4.5 in)	107 mm (4.2 in)	101 mm (4.0 in)	95 mm (3.7 in)	85 mm	75 mm (3.0 in)	67 mm (2.6 in)
7.5 cm StuK 40 L/43	APCR	920 m/s (3,000 ft/s)	173 mm (6.8 in)	164 mm (6.5 in)	151 mm (5.9 in)	139 mm (5.5 in)	127 mm (5.0 in)	117 mm (4.6 in)	108 mm (4.3 in)	91 mm (3.6 in)	77 mm (3.0 in)	65 mm (2.6 in)
7.5 cm KwK 40 L/48	APCBC	750 m/s (2,500 ft/s)	135 mm (5.3 in)	130 mm (5.1 in)	123 mm (4.8 in)	116 mm (4.6 in)	109 mm (4.3 in)	103 mm (4.1 in)	97 mm (3.8 in)	86 mm (3.4 in)	76 mm (3.0 in)	68 mm (2.7 in)
7.5 cm KwK 40 L/48	APCR	930 m/s (3,100 ft/s)	176 mm (6.9 in)	167 mm (6.6 in)	154 mm (6.1 in)	141 mm (5.6 in)	130 mm (5.1 in)	119 mm (4.7 in)	109 mm (4.3 in)	92 mm (3.6 in)	78 mm (3.1 in)	66 mm (2.6 in)

== Usage ==
- L/43
  - Panzer IV Ausf. F2/G
  - Sturmgeschütz III Ausf. F StuK 40
- L/48
  - Panzer IV Ausf. G (Late production)
  - Panzer IV Ausf. H and Ausf. J
  - Sturmgeschütz III Ausf. F/8 and G StuK 40
  - Jagdpanzer IV Pak 39
  - Sturmgeschütz IV StuK 40

== See also ==
- Ordnance QF 75 mm
- F-34 tank gun
- 75 mm Gun M2/M3/M6
- 76 mm Gun M1
- 7.5 cm Pak 39
