= Gepanzerter Mannschaftstransportwagen 'Kätzchen' =

German prototype armoured personnel carrier of WW2

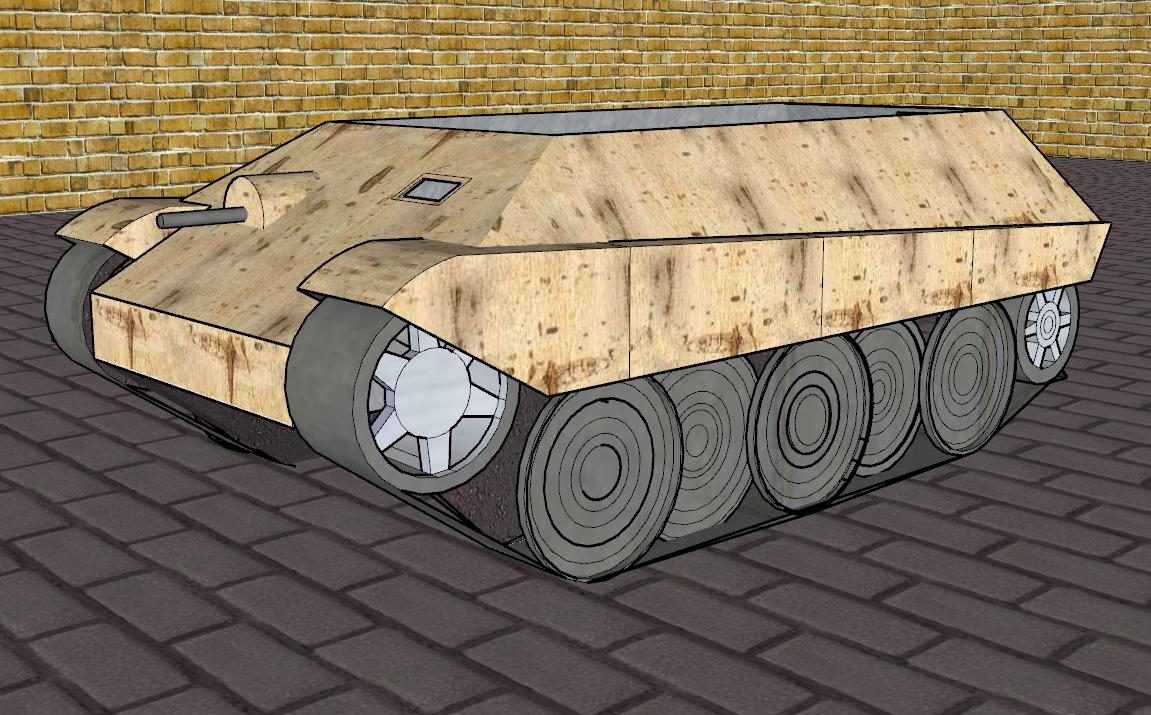
Drawing of a Kätzchen APC

The Gepanzerter Mannschaftstransportwagen Kätzchen (Gep. MTW Kätzchen) (German for kitten) was a prototype German armoured personnel carrier of late World War II.

== Prototypes ==
Auto-Union delivered two prototypes during 1944–45. The hull's shape was similar to the hull of the Panzerkampfwagen Tiger II, but much smaller. The vehicle had front wheel drive with five or six overlapping steel road wheels, possibly resembling the never-built E-25 "replacement tank"'s suspension system in appearance. Power was provided by a Maybach HL50 P engine.

Auto-Union was ordered to stop work on their design and instead, BMM was tasked with adapting the Hetzer tank destroyer chassis for the role. This was referred to as the Vollkettenaufklärer 38(t) Kätzchen.

== Bibliography ==
- Doyle, Hilary Louis & Friedli, Lukas (2016). Vollketten M.S.P. Kätzchen and Final Developments of the Schützenpanzerwagen (Sd.Kfz.251). Panzer Tracts. Vol. 15–4. Boyds, Maryland: Panzer Tracts.
- Chamberlain, Peter & Doyle, Hilary (1993). Encyclopedia of German Tanks of World War Two: A Complete Illustrated Directory of German Battle Tanks, Armoured Cars, Self-Propelled Guns and Semi-Tracked Vehicles, 1933–1945 (revised ed.). London: Arms and Armour. ISBN 1-85409-214-6.
