= 7.5 cm Pak 39 =

7,5 cm Pak 39
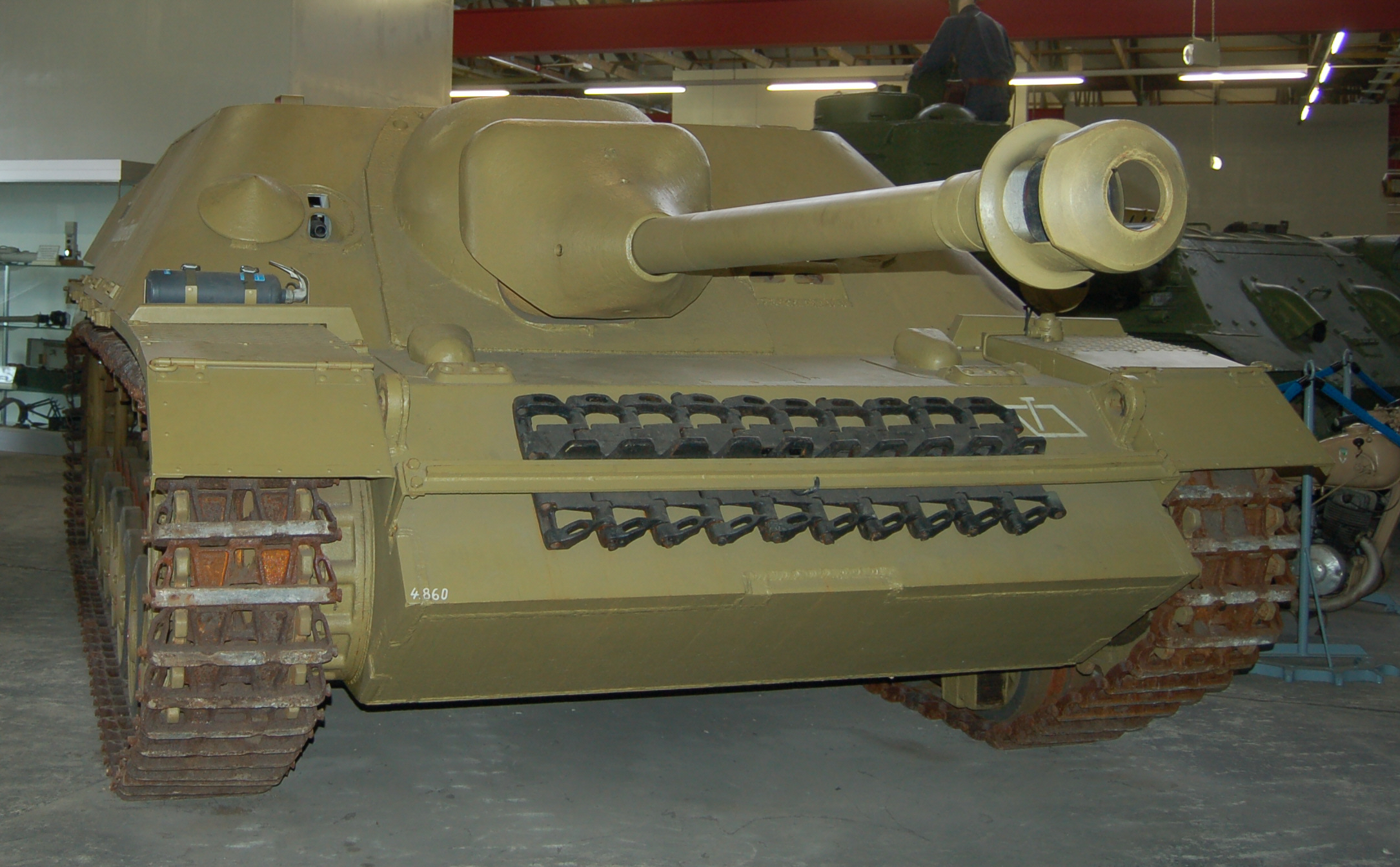
- Jagdpanzer IV / "Panzerjäger 39" with 7.5 cm Pak 39 (L/48) gun
- Type: Anti-tank gun
- Place of origin: Germany

Service history
- Used by: Nazi Germany
- Wars: World War II

Specifications
- Mass: 1,235 kg (2,723 lb)
- Barrel length: 360 cm (140 in) bore (48 calibres)
- Shell: Fixed QF 75 × 495mm R
- Shell weight: 4.1 kg (9.0 lb) Armor-piercing composite rigid (APCR) Pzgr 40
- Calibre: 75 mm (2.95 in)
- Elevation: -8° to +15°
- Traverse: 24°
- Rate of fire: 10–15 round per minute
- Muzzle velocity: 930 m/s (3,100 ft/s)
- Maximum firing range: 6,600 m (21,654 ft)

7.5 cm Pak 39 (7.5 cm Panzerjägerkanone 39) was a 7.5 cm German Second World War era anti-tank gun. The gun was used to equip Jagdpanzer IV/48 and Jagdpanzer 38 self-propelled anti-tank guns (Jagdpanzer); no towed version of the weapon was made. The Pak 39 was an electrically-fired weapon fitted with a semi-automatic breech mechanism and a 48 caliber long barrel. The gun was able to destroy the most common Allied tanks at up to 1,000 meters. It used the same 75 x 495R ammunition as the 7.5 cm KwK 40 of Panzer IV and 7.5 cm StuK 40 gun fitted on the Sturmgeschütz assault guns.

The Pak 39 was manufactured from 1943 onwards by Rheinmetall-Borsig AG in Unterlüß and by Seitz-Werke GmbH in Bad Kreuznach. The main types of ammunition used were: Panzergranatpatrone 39 (APCBC), Sprenggranatpatrone 37 (HE) and different versions of the Granatpatrone 39 HL (HEAT).

== Technical data ==
- Complete designation: 7.5 cm Panzerjägerkanone 39 (L/48)
- Type: Anti-tank gun
- Caliber: 7.5 cm (2.95 in)
- Cartridge: 75×495 mm. R
- Barrel length: 48 calibers 3,615 mm (11 ft 10.3 in)
- Muzzle velocity: 750 m/s (2,500 ft/s) (Panzergranate 39 AP shell)
- Weight: 1,235 kg (2,723 lb)
- Barrel life: 5,000-7,000 rounds
- Main types of ammunition:
  - Panzergranatpatrone 39 (Pzgr.Patr. 39)
  - Sprenggranatpatrone 37 (Sprgr. Patr. 37)
  - Granatpatrone 39 HL (Gr. Patr. 39 HL)

Armor penetration at 30 degrees from the vertical (Note: Vertical penetration against 30° sloped armor, using a PzGr 39 shell)
	Range				
Round	100 m (110 yd)	500 m (550 yd)	1,000 m (1,100 yd)	1,500 m (1,600 yd)	2,000 m (2,200 yd)
PzGr. 39	106 mm (4.2 in)	96 mm (3.8 in)	82 mm (3.2 in)	74 mm (2.9 in)	64 mm (2.5 in)
