= Entwicklung series =

Late-War German tank project

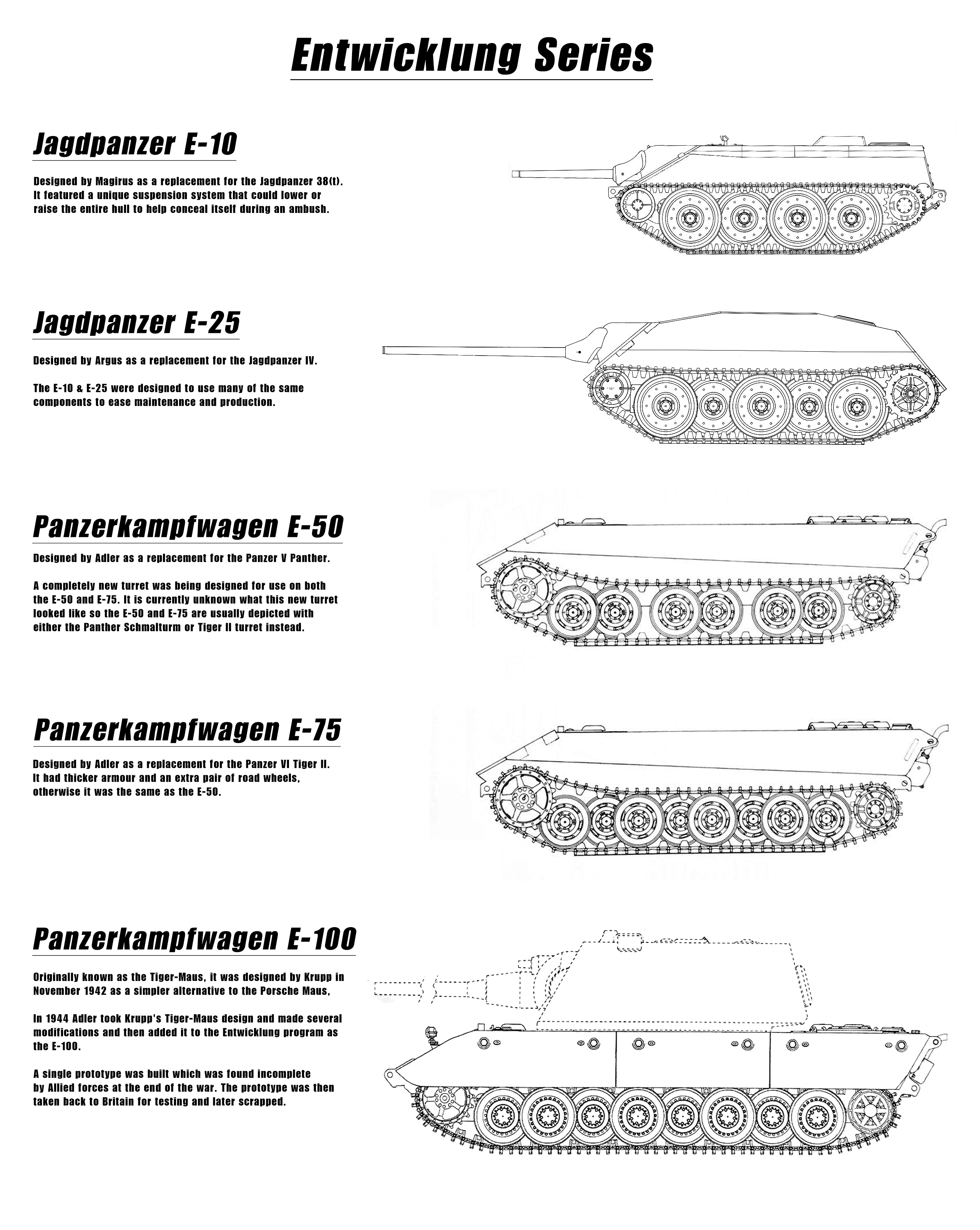
The different vehicles designed for the Entwicklung series.

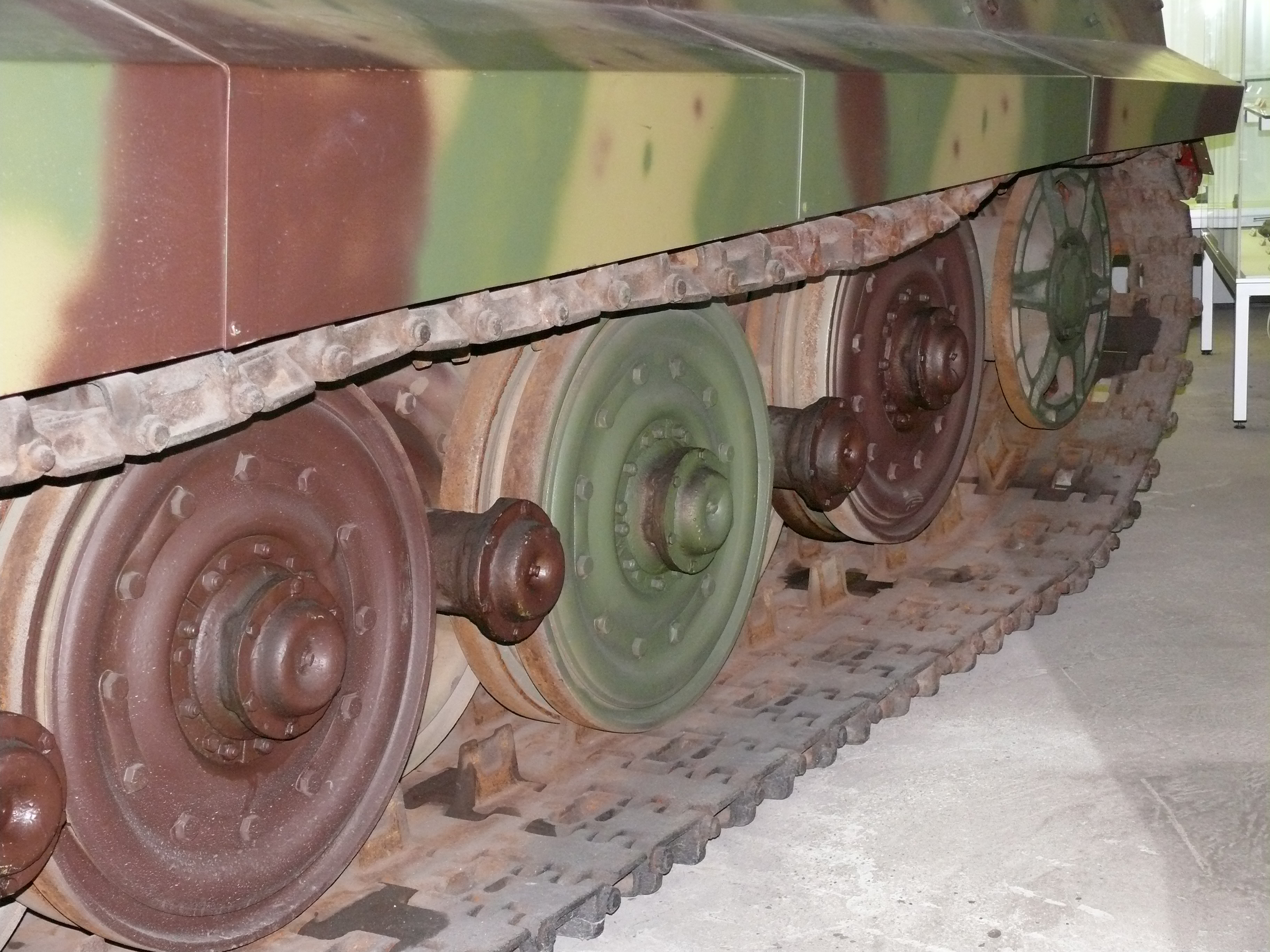
Closeup of a Tiger II's 80 cm diameter roadwheels, meant to be standard on most E-series AFVs.

The Entwicklung series (from German Entwicklung lit. 'development'), more commonly known as the E-Series, was a late-World War II attempt by Nazi Germany to produce a standardised series of tank designs. There were to be standard designs in five different weight classes (E-10, E-25, E-50, E-75 and E-100) from which several specialised variants were to be developed. Design standardisation was envisioned to bring improvements over extreme complexity of previous tank designs that resulted in poor production rates and mechanical unreliability.

The E-series designs were simpler, cheaper to produce and more efficient than their predecessors; however, they offered only modest improvements in armour and firepower over the designs they were intended to replace, such as the Jagdpanzer 38(t), Panther Ausf. G or Tiger II; and would have represented the final standardization of German armoured vehicle design. Indeed, nearly all of the E-series vehicles—up to and including the E-75—were intended to use what were essentially the Tiger II's 80 centimeter steel-rimmed wheels for their suspension, meant to overlap each other (as on the later production Tiger and Panther tanks that also used them), abandoning the interleaved Schachtellaufwerk suspension that first appeared on German military half-tracks in the early 1930s.

== Jagdpanzer E-10 ==
E-10

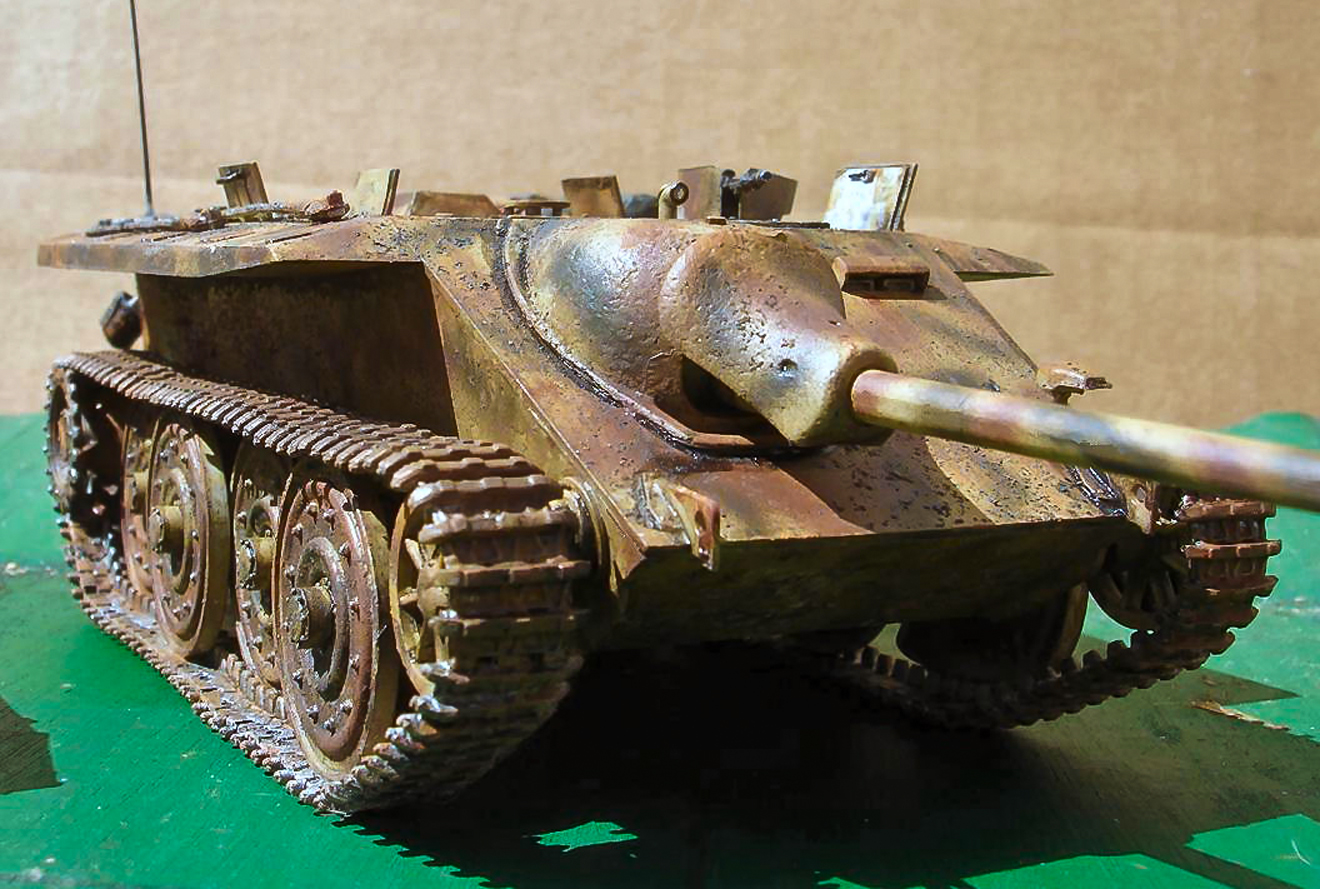
Model of an E-10

Said to have been designed by the Klockner-Humboldt-Deutz Magirus AG firm in Ulm, the E-10 project (development name: "Hetzer") was developed as a replacement for the Jagdpanzer 38(t). (Note: "With this powerful engine [the experimental fuel-injected Maybach HL101], the E10 was to be specially suitable as a 'Hetzer' against the new fast enemy 'Hellcat' tank." It was dropped in favour of the Jagdpanzer 38D (another uncompleted project), a series of German-made gun platforms based on the Czech Jagdpanzer 38(t).) The name Hetzer was never officially used for the 38(t).

The designs based on this new chassis would all be in the 10 to 25 tonnes weight class, and using only four Tiger II-style but larger all-steel road wheels per side in an overlapping layout for its main "slack-track" suspension with no return rollers and a rear drive sprocket. Much simplified was the suspension, which was intended to be based on the concept of using conical-spring Belleville washers for the E-series AFVs as a whole. These were simply bolted on to the chassis and could be easily removed for repair or replacement. This suspension system was later used on the Swiss Panzer 61. A most interesting aspect was the ability to lower the hull by placing the pivot points of the suspension units higher in respect to the hull bottom; by not having torsion-bars occupying the entire hull planform in the lowermost interior areas of the hull, but via cranks driven by hydraulic actuators on the sides of the hull. This reduced the height of the vehicles from 176 cm to 140 cm.

The intention was to create several new light tank destroyers as a replacement for the Jagdpanzer 38(t). The two were so similar that early crews of the Jagdpanzer 38(t) were told it was the Hetzer (A codename for the E-10). The name mistakenly stuck with the Jagdpanzer 38(t) throughout the war and into the 21st century. E-10 also included a new family of gun platforms (Waffenträger) armed with heavy anti-tank guns. However, from September 1944 the design was abandoned in favour of a redesigned and enlarged Jagdpanzer 38(t), using German parts as opposed to the Czech parts for the Jagdpanzer 38(t). This new design was called Jagdpanzer 38D, and was to use a Tatra 12-cylinder air-cooled diesel engine similar to the one fitted to the Sd.Kfz. 234 'Puma'. None of these vehicles reached series production.

== Jagdpanzer E-25 ==
E-25

E-25 side view

The E-25 designs, in the 25-50 tonnes weight class, were to be the replacements of all Panzer III and Panzer IV based designs, with involvement of the Alkett, Argus, Adler and Porsche firms. This family would include medium reconnaissance vehicles, medium Jagdpanzer vehicles and heavy Waffenträger vehicles. All would use five Tiger II style road wheels but larger per side in a similar overlapping layout to the lighter E-10 suspension, as well as "slack-track" design and a rear drive sprocket. As main armament, a 7.5 cm KwK 42 was planned, with a possible MG in a small turret. Overall, this vehicle would have been similar to the Jagdpanzer 38(t) tank destroyer. The tank would have been very maneuverable, and due to its low profile, hard to spot on the battlefield.

== E-50/E-75 Standardpanzer ==
E-50, interpretation fitted with Schmalturm-based turret

E-75, interpretation fitted with Tiger II turret

The E-50 and E-75 "Standardpanzers" were intended to replace the Panther and Tiger II tanks. For ease of manufacture, both vehicles were to be built on the same production lines, and share as many components as possible.

Unlike prior German tank designs equipped with torsion bar suspensions, an external suspension using Belleville springs, designed by Adlerwerke, was to be used.

The engine to be installed was the Maybach HL234, an improved version of the HL230 as found on Panther and Tiger II, but fitted with improved components as well as direct fuel injection, making 900 hp at 3000 rpm. An improved variant of this engine, the HL232, fitted with supercharging powered by an auxiliary engine allowing it to produce 1000 hp, was also proposed to be fitted.

Unlike prior German designs, the tanks were to be fitted with a rear transmission. The previously external final drives were also to be moved inside the hull and joined with the transmission and steering units into a single assembly, simplifying production and maintenance, as well as reducing weight. The transmission, also designed by Adlerwerke, was to consist of a hydraulic pre-selected 8-speed gearbox, with a dual-radius steering unit. Alternative drivetrain concepts included diesel engines, as well as hydromechanical transmissions by Maybach or Voith.

Both the E-50 and E-75 were to mount the same drivetrain. The difference in maximum speeds, 50 km/h (31 mph) for the E-50 and 40 km/h (25 mph) for the E-75 were to be achieved with a single gear modification.

Both hulls were to have the same dimensions, differing only in their armour thicknesses. While similar to the hull of the Tiger II, there were overall design differences. The E-50/E-75 upper front plate was angled at 60 degrees, compared to 55 degrees for both the Panther and Tiger II. Drafts showed that the upper front plate was meant to be 100 and 150 mm thick for the E-50 and E-75 respectively.

To accommodate the heavier E-75 hull, 4 suspension bogies were to be fitted instead of 3 on the E-50. The combat track for the E-50 was also intended to be used as the transport track of the E-75.

Limited information exists for the turrets and armament that were meant to be used on the E-50 and E-75. Neither the Panther’s Schmalturm, nor the Tiger II’s turret were intended for use on the new tanks. Krupp was to design the new turret.

Development work on the designs would cease by August of 1944, with no plans for the complete assembly of a full vehicle ever laid out.

== E-100 ==
E-100

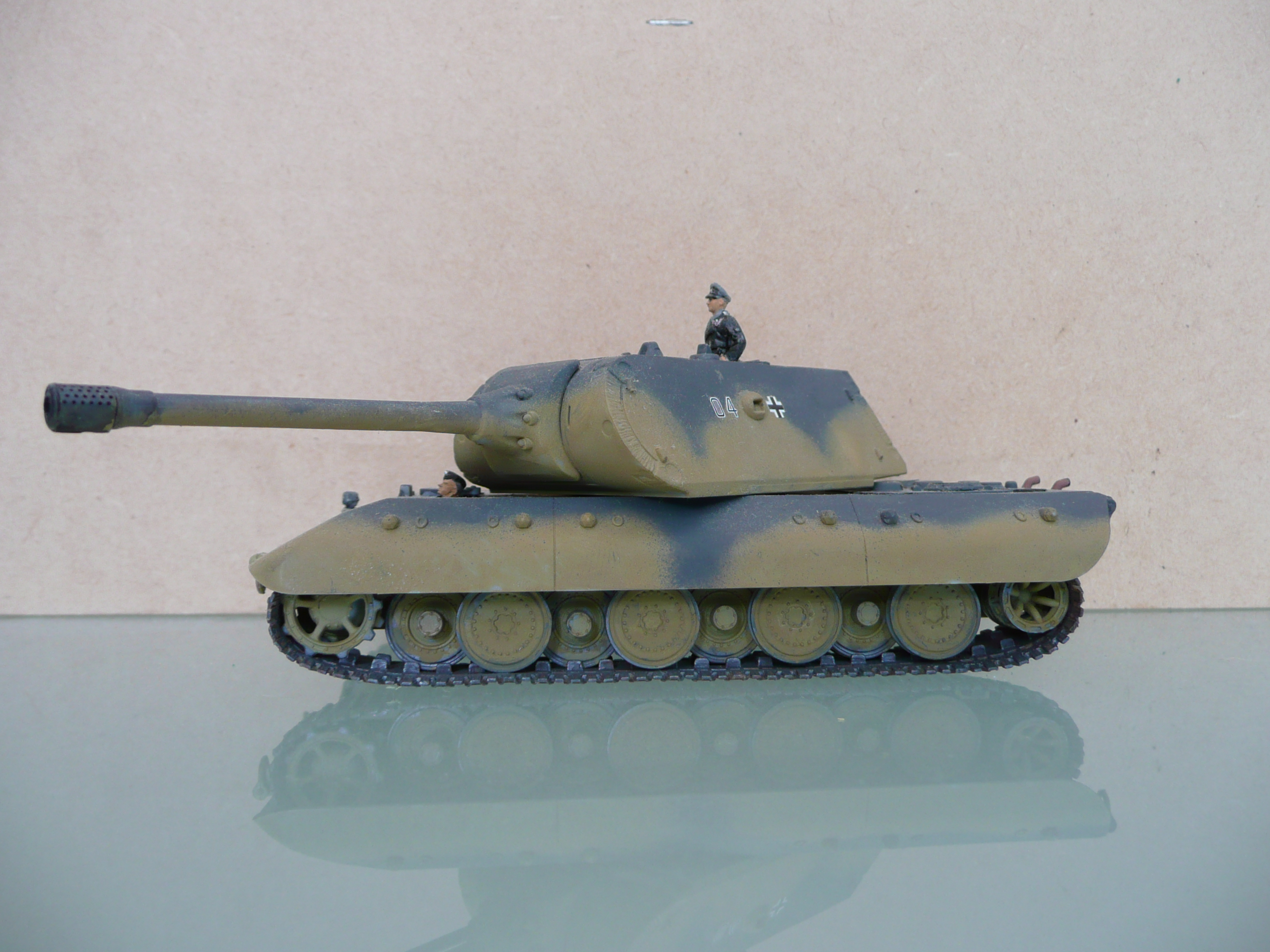
A 1:72 scale Tiger-Maus Model

The earliest ancestor of the E-100 was the Tiger-Maus. It was supposed to be a simplified Maus. The Tiger-Maus was never built, but it was to use components from the Tiger I Ausf. H and a slightly modified turret from the Maus.

The E-100 was to be a superheavy combat tank designed to be the replacement for the prototype-only, Porsche-designed Maus. Development and building of a prototype E-100 started in 1944 but was largely abandoned after Adolf Hitler ordered an end to the development of the Maus.

Only the chassis was finished. It was taken to the United Kingdom for evaluation purposes and eventually scrapped.

During early development the Maus turret was planned for the E-100, but later a modified Maus II turret was proposed to have been used. It would have housed 128 mm KwK 44 L/55 (75 rounds) and a 7.5 cm KwK 37 L/24.

According to Panzer Tracts 6-3, there was a proposal for the 15 cm KwK 44 L/38 to be mounted on the E-100 as well. The US military magazine Armor reported in its January–February 1959 edition that a 150 mm cannon was considered for the E-100 during the Second World War. This was also reported by Anthony Tucker-Jones. According to Kenneth Estes, a 150 mm or even 170 mm gun was proposed for the E-100 but Estes reports that Dr Karl Jenschke, the Adler works technical director and chief constructor, considered this only possible on an assault gun variant of such a vehicle (Sturmgeschütz E100), because the turret space could not support such weapons.

Estes reports the following specifications for the E-100:

- Crew: 6
- Weight: 123.5 ton design
- Power-to-weight ratio: 4.8
- Length: 11.073 m overall (8.733 chassis)
- Width: 4.48 m
- Height: 3.375 m
- Turret basket diameter: N/A
- Engines: Maybach HL230 V-12 gasoline, 700 hp; the theoretical replacement was the experimental fuel-injected HL234 developing 900 hp, which never reached series production
- Transmission: ZF Olvar pre-selector gearbox OG 40 12 16B; for the HL234 engine, a Mekydro transmission was specified
- Fuel capacity: 2050 L internal
- Max speed (road): 23 km/h
- Max range: 160 km
- Ground clearance: 0.5 m
- Ground pressure: 1.26 kg/cm2 (17.93 psi)
- Armament: 128 mm KwK 44 L/55, one 75 mm L/24, one MG-34. Elevation -7/+20 degrees. Ammunition stowage unknown.
- Armour (mm/angle in degrees from vertical):
  - Hull front: 200/60 upper, 150/50 lower
  - Hull sides: 120/0
  - Hull rear: 150/30
  - Hull top: 40/90 forward
  - Hull bottom: 80/90 forward, 40/90 aft
  - Turret front: 200/30
  - Turret side: 80/29
  - Turret rear: 150/15
  - Turret roof: 40/90

== Post-war development ==
After the war, the French designed and built the AMX-50 series of armoured fighting vehicles, which used a 1000 hp Maybach engine with rear drive, as had been intended for the E-50 and E-75, whilst the idea of external Belleville washer suspension - which was also developed with the Entwicklung series in mind - resurfaced on the Swiss Panzer 61.

== Sources ==
- Information about the E-100 at Panzerworld
- "Achtung Panzer — Entwicklung Series — Jagdpanzer E-10". achtungpanzer.com. Achtung Panzer. Archived from the original on April 5, 2018.
- Ogorkiewicz, Richard M. (1959). "The First Presentation of Tank Armament". Armor. Vol. LXVIII, January-February 1959, No 1. The United States Armor Association. p. 28.
- von Senger und Etterlin, F. M. (1969). German Tanks of World War II: The Complete Illustrated History of German Armoured Fighting Vehicles 1926-1945. New York: Galahad Books. ISBN 0-88365-051-7.
- Spielberger, Walter J.; Doyle, Hilary L. (2007). Special Panzer Variants: Development - Production - Operations. Atglen, PA: Schiffer Publishing. ISBN 978-0-7643-2622-6.
- Jentz, Thomas J.; Doyle, Hilary L. (2008). Panzer Tracts No.6-3: Schwere Panzerkampfwagen Maus and E 100: development and production from 1942-1945. Boyds, MD: Panzer Tracts. ISBN 0-9815382-3-1.
- Jentz, Thomas J.; Doyle, Hilary L. (2001). Panzer Tracts No.20-1: Paper Panzers – Panzerkampfwagen, Sturmgeschuetz and Jagdpanzer. Boyds, MD: Panzer Tracts. ISBN 097084073X.
- Estes, Kenneth W. (2018). German Heavy Fighting Vehicles of the Second World War: From Tiger to E-100. Fonthill Media. ISBN 978-1-78155-646-7.
- Tucker-Jones, Anthony (2013). Images of War Special: Tiger I & Tiger II. Pen & Sword Military. ISBN 1781590303.
- Fröhlich, Michael (2019). German Super Heavy Panzer Projects of World War II: Wehrmacht Concepts & Designs. Atglen: Schiffer Military History. pp. 33–38. ISBN 978-0764358654.
- Zaitsev, Dmitry (2022). "A Prospective Standard Chassis". Tank Archives. Translated from original article (Russian) https://vk.com/@kedoki-chto-my-znaem-o-e-50-i-e-75
