= Sturmgeschütz IV =

German WW2 assault gun

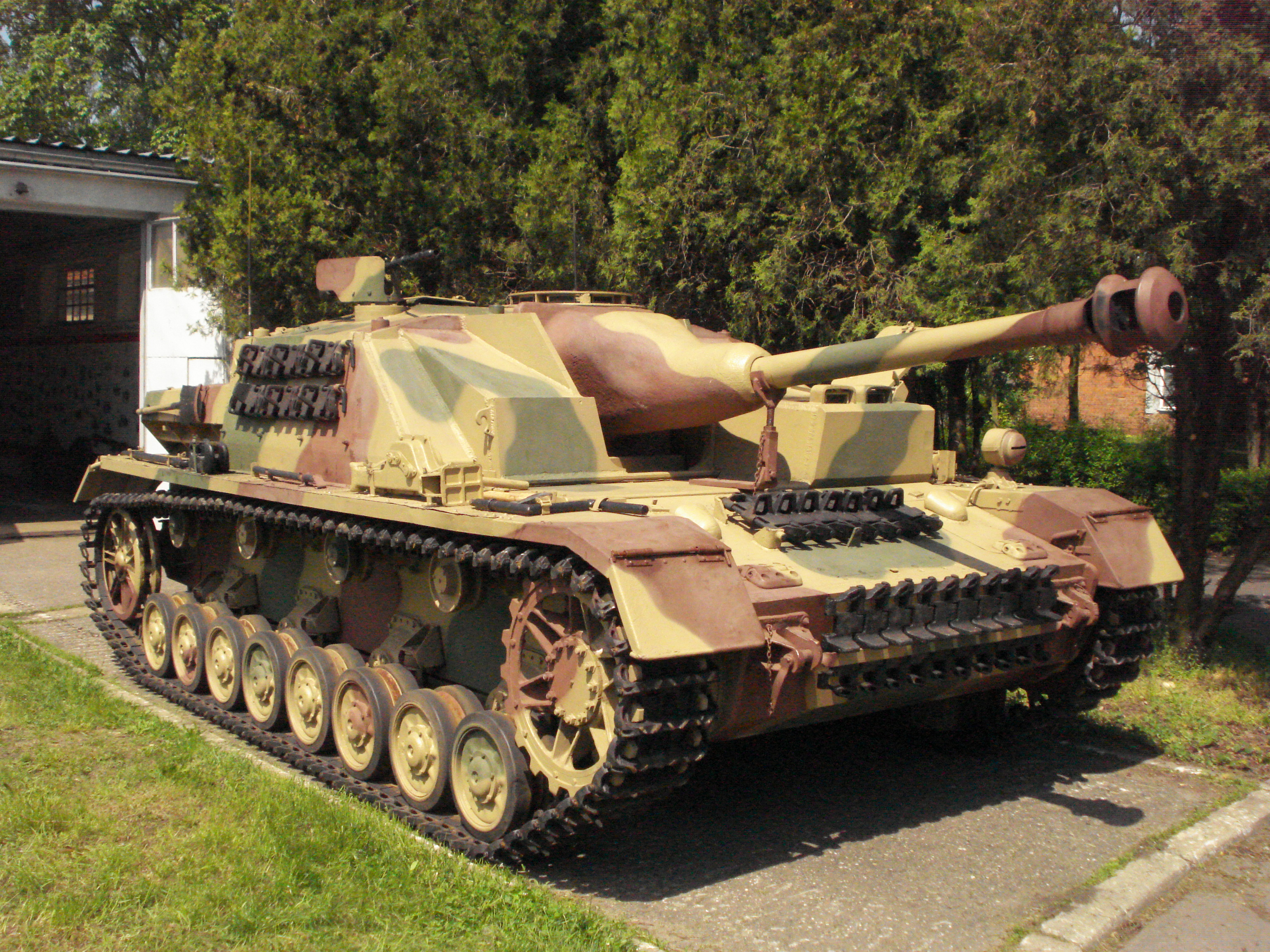
- The StuG IV held by the Armoured Warfare Museum in Poznań, Poland
- Type: Assault gun
- Place of origin: Nazi Germany

Service history
- In service: 1943–1945
- Used by: Nazi Germany
- Wars: World War II

Production history
- Manufacturer: Fried. Krupp Grusonwerk AG, Magdeburg-Buckau, Alkett
- Produced: December 1943–1945
- No. built: 1,141

Specifications
- Mass: 23 tonnes (50,705 lbs)
- Length: 6.7 m (20 ft)
- Width: 2.95 m (9 ft 8 in)
- Height: 2.20 m (7 ft 3 in)
- Crew: 4 (Commander, Gunner, Loader, Driver)
- Armor: 10–80 mm (.39–3.14 in)
- Main armament: 1 × 7.5 cm StuK 40 L/48; 63 rounds
- Secondary armament: 1 × 7.92 mm Maschinengewehr 34; 600 rounds
- Engine: Maybach HL120 TRM V-12-cylinder gasoline 300 PS (296 hp, 220.6 kW)
- Power/weight: 13 PS (9.6 kW) / tonne
- Transmission: ZF SSG 76 Aphon, 6 forward gears, 1 reverse
- Suspension: Leaf spring
- Ground clearance: 40.0 cm (16 inches)
- Fuel capacity: 430 liter
- Operational range: Road: 210 km (130 mi); Cross-country: 120 km (75 mi)
- Maximum speed: 40 km/h (25 mph)

The Sturmgeschütz IV (StuG IV) (Sd.Kfz. 167) was a German assault gun variant of the Panzer IV used in the latter part of the Second World War. It was identical in role and concept to the highly successful StuG III assault gun variant of the Panzer III. Both StuG models were given a tank destroyer role in German formations and tactical planning in the last two years of the war, greatly augmenting the capability of the dwindling tank force available to the German army on the Eastern and Western fronts.

== Development ==
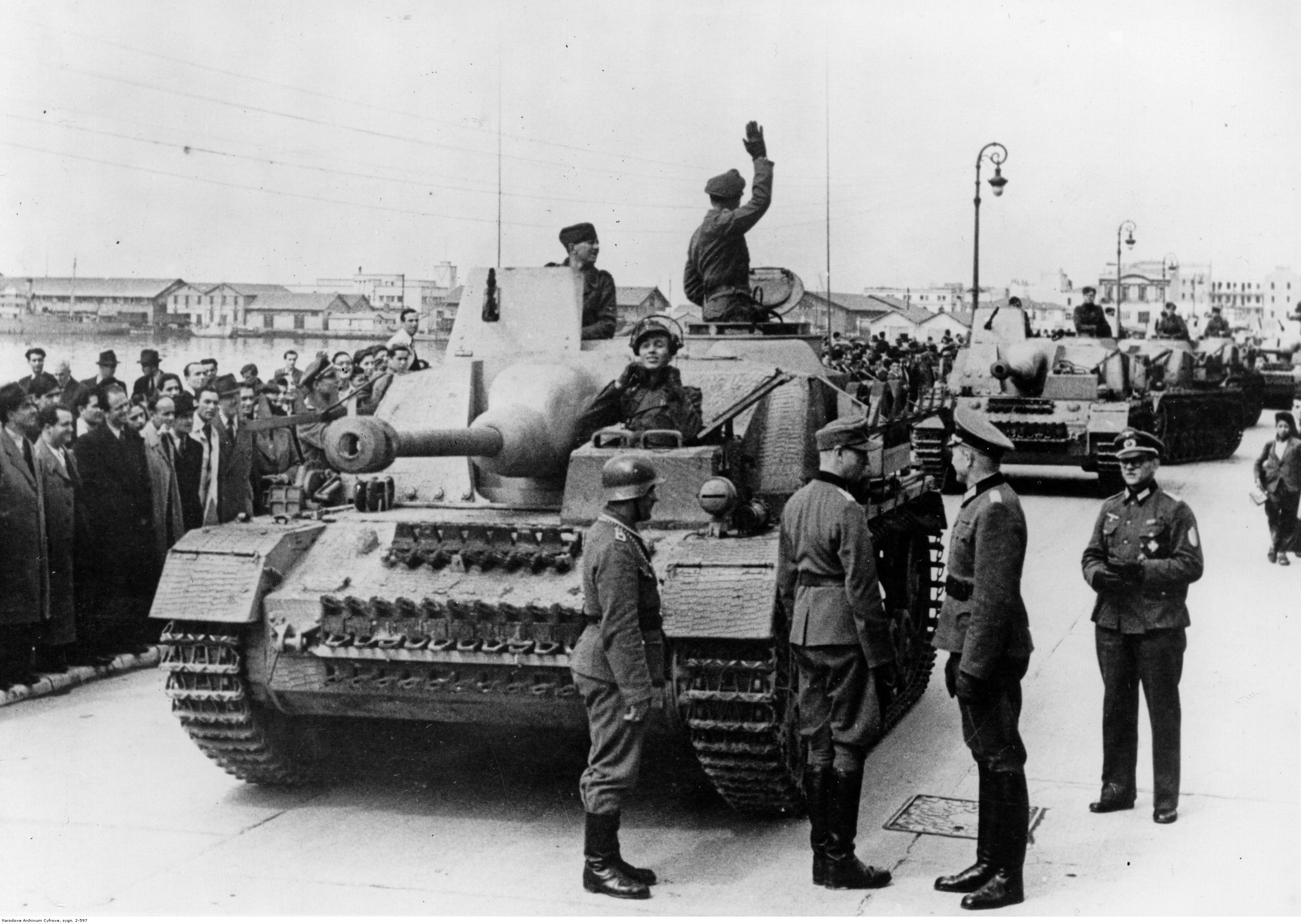
A column of StuG IV assault guns arrive in the Greek port city of Thessaloniki, 1944.

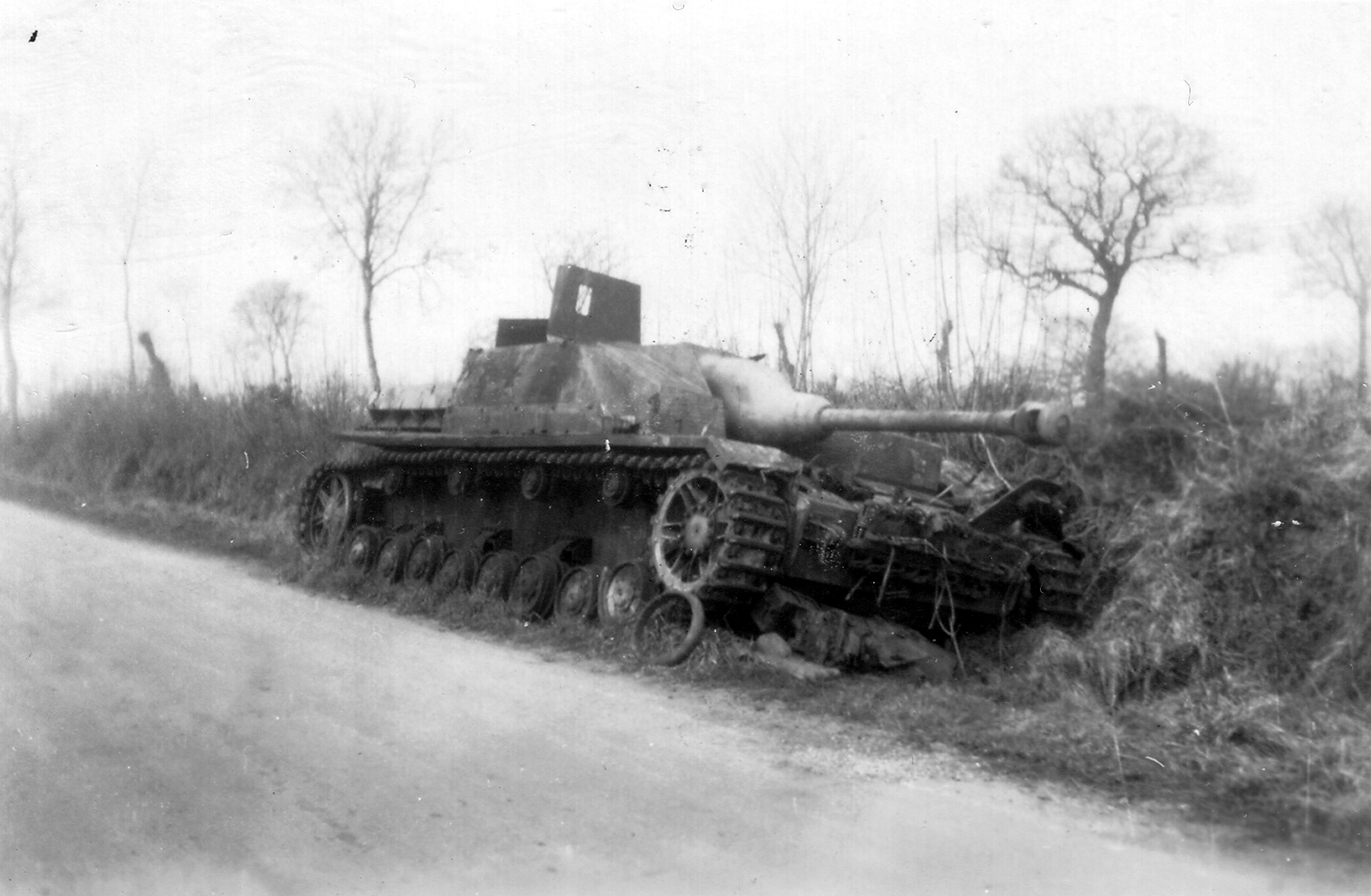
A StuG IV destroyed and abandoned in Normandy, 1944.

The Sturmgeschütz IV resulted from Krupp's effort to supply an assault gun. As Krupp did not build Panzerkampfwagen IIIs, they used the Panzerkampfwagen IV chassis in combination with a slightly modified Sturmgeschütz III superstructure.

The first known proposal for a Sturmgeschütz on the Panzer IV chassis is in Krupp drawing number W1468 dated February 1943. This initial drawing utilised the outdated Sturmgeschütz Ausf. F superstructure on a Panzer IV chassis. This proposal had a sloped front superstructure with a combat weight of 28.26 tons. Krupp abandoned it in February 1943 because it was too heavy. Plans for the StuG IV were halted.

During the Führer Conference of 19 to 22 August 1943, after the Battle of Kursk, Hitler had seen reports of the StuG III outperforming the Panzer IV when used in an infantry support role and tactical defence. Convinced that a tank-hunter version would be superior to the tank version, Hitler planned to switch Panzer IV production to "Panzerjäger IV" production as soon as possible. It was to mount the same 7.5 cm L/70 used for the Panther. Another manufacturer, Vomag built a prototype Panzerjäger IV with 7.5 cm L/48 gun and demonstrated it on 20 October 1943. It was later re-designated as Jagdpanzer IV Ausf. F. As the Jagdpanzer IV was already being produced by Vomag, the StuG IV may not have materialized, had it not been for the major disruption of StuG III production, and the scarce supply of the 7.5 cm L/70 gun designated for the Jagdpanzer IV.

In November 1943, Alkett, the manufacturer of the StuG III, suffered damage due to an Allied bombing raid. They produced 255 StuG III in October 1943, but in December production fell to just 24 vehicles. A conference held from 6 to 7 December 1943, addressed possible solutions to this problem. Hitler welcomed the suggestion of taking the StuG III superstructure and mounting it on a Panzer IV chassis. The StuG IV could be more quickly manufactured than the Jagdpanzer IV at the time. This restarted the Sturmgeschütz IV project. This time, the superstructure of the StuG III Ausf. G was mounted on a Panzer IV chassis 7, with a box compartment for the driver added. Combat weight was 23000 kg, lighter than the 23900 kg for the StuG III Ausf. G. Between 16 and 17 December 1943, Hitler was shown the StuG IV and approved it. To make up for the large deficit in StuG III production StuG IV production was now given full support.

From December 1943 to May 1945, Krupp built 1,111 StuG IVs, in early 1944 Alkett built 30 Stug IVs using new Panzer IV chassis sent from Nibelungenwerk. While the number is smaller than the 10,000+ StuG III, the StuG IV supplemented and fought along with StuG III during 1944–45, when they were most needed.

== Design ==
The StuG IV became known as an effective tank killer, especially on the Eastern Front.

It had a four-man crew, and was issued mainly to infantry divisions.

- Commander in hull left rear
- Gunner in hull left center
- Loader in hull right rear
- Driver in hull left front

== Surviving vehicles ==
There are presently six surviving examples of the StuG IV.

- Poland
  - One in the Muzeum im. Orła Białego (White Eagle Museum) a military museum located in the town of Skarżysko-Kamienna. It is a makeshift restoration using a StuG IV hull and various parts from Stug IIIs and Panzer IVs.
  - One in the Armoured Warfare Museum in Poznań. It is complete and in running condition.
- Latvia
  - In October 2011, a StuG IV found in a swamp in the former Courland Pocket was restored by a Latvian enthusiast. This vehicle, with no engine or gearbox, was offered for sale on milweb.net at an asking price of 425,000 Euros. It was also listed on eBay with a "Buy It Now" price of 900,000 US Dollars.
- Australia
  - A working StuG IV was restored by the Australian Armour and Artillery Museum.
- Russia
  - Restored by the Vadim Zadorozhny Museum.
  - One in the Museum Of Military Equipment "Battle Glory Of The Urals". This vehicle was restored in 2009-2010 and lacks an engine and transmission.

== See also ==
=== Comparable vehicles ===
- Germany: Hetzer, StuG III, Jagdpanzer IV
- Italy: Semovente da 75/34
- Japan: Type 3 Ho-Ni III
- Romania: Mareșal
- Soviet Union: SU-85
- United States: M10 GMC
- Hungary: 44M Zrínyi I
