= Panzergranate 39 =

German armor-piercing shell

Cutaway drawing of 7,5 cm Pzgr. 39. 1: fuze; 2: tracer; 3: driving band; 4: explosive filler; 5: penetrator; 6: soft cap; 7: ballistic cap

The Panzergranate 39, abbreviated to Pzgr. 39, was a German armor-piercing shell used during World War II. It was manufactured in various calibers and was the most common anti-tank shell used in German tank (German: Kampfwagenkanone; shortened to KwK) and anti-tank guns (German: Panzerabwehrkanone(n); shortened to PaK) of 37 to 88 mm (1.5 to 3.5 in) caliber.

== Design ==
The Pzgr. 39 was an APCBC-HE-T design. It consisted of the shell body that was armour penetrating (AP) using a cap (C) to increase performance against sloped armour, a ballistic cap (BC) to increase aerodynamic performance along with a high explosive (HE) filler and tracer unit (T) that was incorporated into the base fuze. Phlegmatized PETN or RDX were commonplace as the explosive filling. Pzgr. 39 was only used in guns firing fixed ammunition. The same Pzgr. 39 shells of a certain caliber could be fitted to different cartridge cases. For example, the 7.5 cm Pak 40 L/46 antitank gun and the 7.5 cm KwK 40 L/48 tank gun fired the same projectile, even though they had completely different cartridge cases.

Different versions of the shell were made, but the changes were usually minor. For instance, in the 88 mm Pzgr. 39-1 version the quality of steel was improved. The 75 mm Pzgr. 39/42 of KwK 42 and Pak 42 guns had two driving bands instead of one. In the Pzgr. 39/43 of KwK and Pak 43 guns, the driving bands were made wider than those of Pzgr. 39-1. The widening took place because the high gas pressure in these long-barreled guns presented certain problems when firing the older Pzgr. 39–1 shells with narrower driving bands. The abbreviation 'FES', found on many Pzgr. 39 rounds indicates the presence of sintered iron driving bands.

== Technical data - 75 mm Pzgr. 39 FES ==
- Weight, complete with fuze: 6.8 kg (15 lb)
- Explosive filler: 18 g (0.63 oz) of RDX and wax (90/10)
- Propellant: 2.4 kg (5.3 lb)
- Number of driving bands: 1
- Material of driving band: sintered iron
- Shell diameter at driving band: 77.4 mm (3.05 in)
- Shell body diameter: 74.5 mm (2.93 in)
- Fuze: Bd.Z. 5103
  - Type: base fuze
  - Weight with tracer unit: 107 g (3.8 oz)
  - Tracer burning time: 2 seconds
