= Jagdpanzer IV =

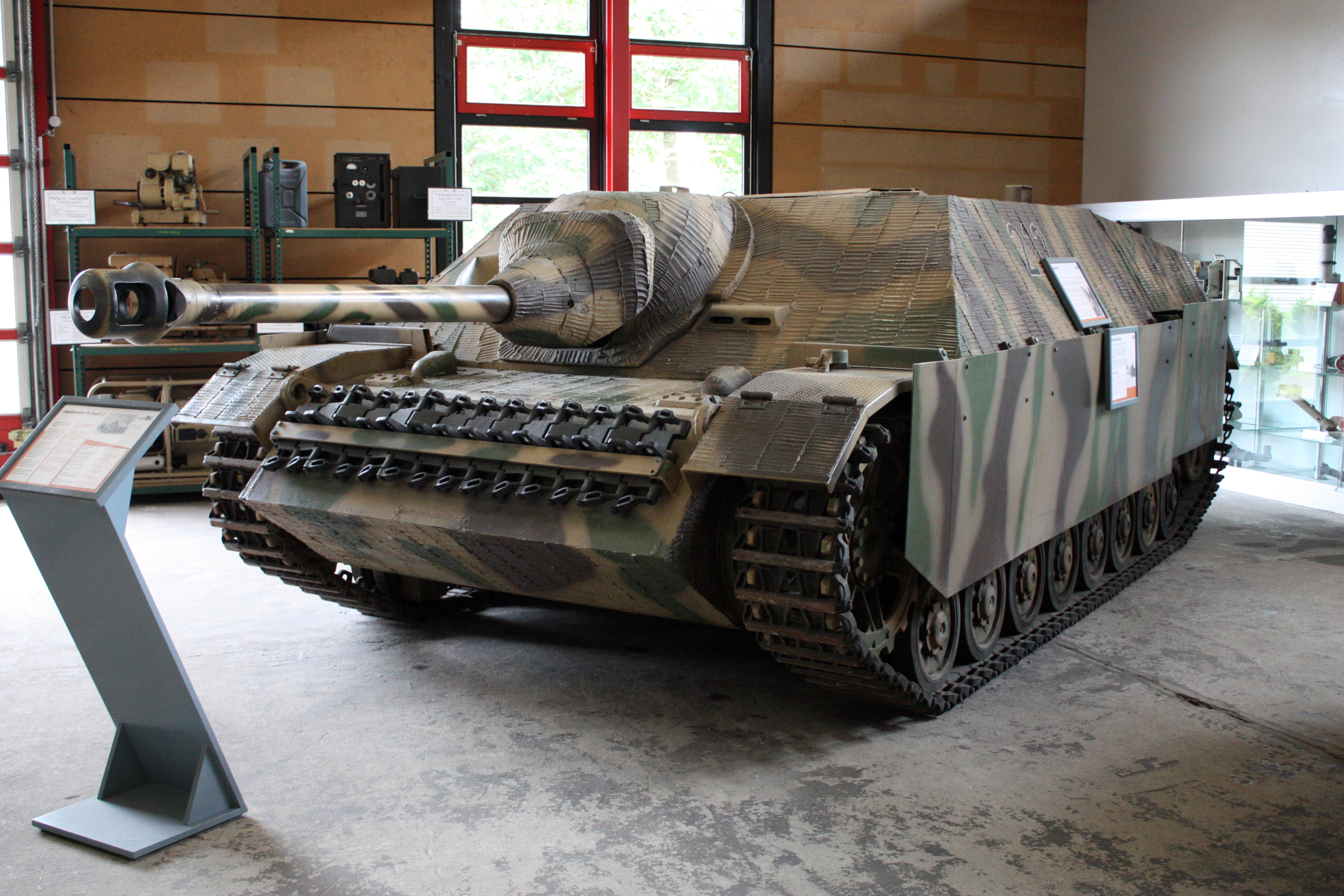
- Jagdpanzer IV (Sd.Kfz.162) with 7.5 cm Pak 39 L/48 at the Deutsches Panzermuseum
- Type: Self-propelled anti-tank gun
- Place of origin: Nazi Germany

Production history
- Produced: December 1943 – April 1945
- No. built: About 2,000

Specifications (Panzer IV/70(V))
- Mass: 25.8 tonnes (28.4 short tons; 25.4 long tons)
- Length: 8.5 m (27 ft 11 in)
- Width: 3.17 m (10 ft 5 in)
- Height: 1.85 m (6 ft 1 in)
- Crew: 4 (driver, commander, gunner, loader)
- Armor: 10–80 mm (0.39–3.15 in)
- Main armament: 1× 7.5 cm Pak 42 L/70; 55-60 rounds
- Secondary armament: 1× 7.92 mm Maschinengewehr 42; 1,200 rounds
- Engine: Maybach HL120 TRM; 300 PS (296 hp, 221 kW)
- Power/weight: 11.6 PS (8.6 kW) / tonne
- Suspension: Leaf springs
- Operational range: Road: 210 km (130 mi); Cross-country: 120 km (75 mi)
- Maximum speed: 35 km/h (22 mph) on road

The Jagdpanzer IV / Sd.Kfz. 162, was a German tank destroyer based on the Panzer IV chassis and built in three main variants. As one of the casemate-style turretless Jagdpanzer (tank destroyer, literally "hunting tank") designs, it was developed against the wishes of Heinz Guderian, the inspector general of the Panzertruppen, as a replacement for the Sturmgeschütz III (StuG III). Guderian objected to what he considered a needless diversion of resources from Panzer IV production, as the StuG III was still more than adequate for its role.

Officially, only the L/48-armed vehicle was named the Jagdpanzer IV. The L/70-armed vehicle was named the Panzer IV/70. In this article, both versions are referred to in general as the Jagdpanzer IV, except in the variants and surviving vehicles section.

== Development ==
With experience gained during the initial phases of the Battle of Stalingrad, in September 1942 the Wehrmacht's arms bureau, the Waffenamt, called for a new standard for heavy assault guns: 100 mm of armor to the front, 40–50 mm on the sides, wider tracks, ground clearance of 50 cm (20 in), top speed of 26 km/h (16 mph) and the lowest possible firing positions. The new Panzerjäger ("tank hunter") design would be armed with the same 7.5 cm gun as fitted to the Panther tank: the Pak 42 L/70. Initially a new chassis was planned, but that of the Panzer IV had to be used.

Previous efforts to mount bigger guns on smaller chassis resulted in the Marder I, II and III series and the Sturmgeschütz III. The Marder series were tall and had open crew compartments. The new design had a low silhouette and completely enclosed, casemate-style fighting compartment.

The Jagdpanzer IV used a modified Panzer IV Ausf. H chassis, but the almost-vertical front hull plate was replaced by sloped armor plates. Internally, the layout was changed to accommodate the new superstructure, moving the fuel tanks and ammunition racks. Since the Jagdpanzer lacked a turret, the auxiliary engine which powered the Panzer IV's turret traverse mechanism could be eliminated.

The new superstructure had 80 mm thick sloped armour, giving much greater protection than vertical armour of 100 mm. To make the manufacturing process as simple as possible, the superstructure was made from large, interlocking plates that were welded together.

== Armament ==
=== Main gun ===
Armament consisted of a 7.5 cm main gun firing Fixed QF 75 × 640mm R ammunition, originally intended to be the Pak 42 L/70. Due to shortages, older guns were initially used, the 7.5 cm Pak 39 L/43 for pre-production, and the 7.5 cm Pak 39 L/48 for the initial production variant. These were shorter and less powerful than the Pak 42, and also carried a muzzle brake.

Installing the much heavier Pak 42 meant that the Jagdpanzer IV was nose-heavy, especially with the heavy frontal armour. This made them less mobile and more difficult to operate in rough terrain, leading their crews to nickname them Guderian-Ente ("Guderian's duck"). To prevent the rubber rims of the roadwheels being dislocated by the weight of the vehicle, some later versions had steel roadwheels installed on the front.

The final prototype of the Jagdpanzer IV was presented in December 1943 and production started in January 1944, with the Pak 39 L/48 armed variant staying in production until November. Production of the Pak 42 L/70 armed variants started in August and continued until March/April 1945.

=== Secondary armament ===
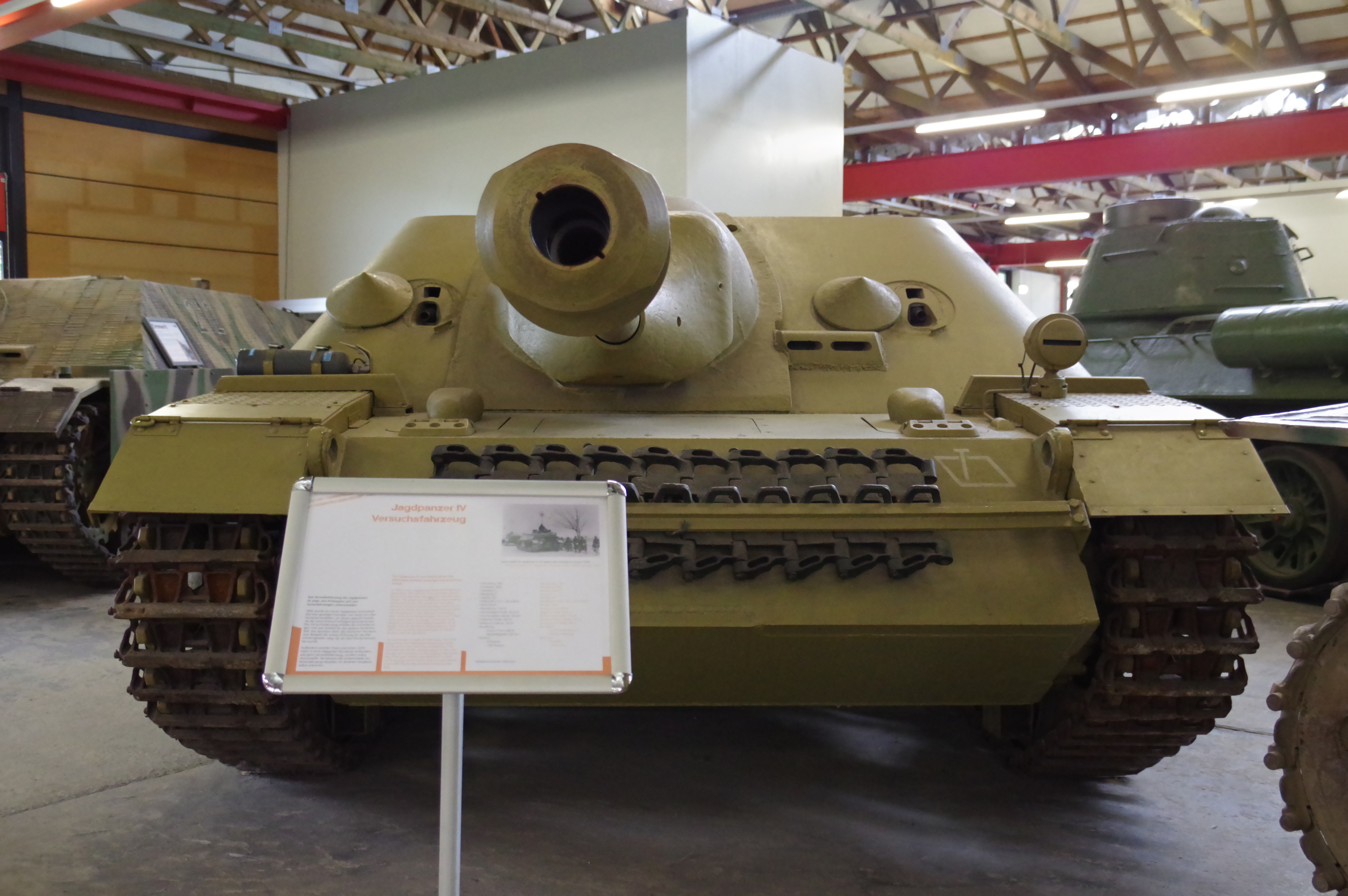
Jagdpanzer IV 0-Serie preproduction vehicle with 2 opened front facing firing ports next to the main gun

Early versions of the Jagdpanzer IV carried two standard (no modification made) MG 42 machine guns on both sides of the main gun mantlet/glacis, firing 7.92×57mm Mauser rifle ammunition through a firing port which was protected by an armored cover plate (with the MG 42 retracted) when not in use. As the main gun was located between these machine guns one machine gun could be operated from the left side only, which is impractical for non-left-handed operators, and the other one from the right side only. Later version Jagdpanzer IVs carried only one MG 42 as internal secondary armament with about 1,200 rounds of ammunition. The Jagdpanzer IV secondary armament was exceptional, as other World War II era German tanks or other armored vehicles used the MG 34 for internal secondary or co-axial armament.

== Production ==
On 19–22 August 1943, after the Battle of Kursk, Hitler received reports that StuG IIIs performed better than the Panzer IV within the constraints of how they were deployed. It was thus intended to stop production of the Panzer IV itself at the end of 1944 to concentrate solely on production of the Jagdpanzer IV, but the Panzer IV continued to be produced until the end of the conflict along with Jagdpanzer IV. VoMAG in Plauen switched completely from Panzer IV production to Jagdpanzer IV in Spring 1944, Krupp-Grusonwerk in Magdeburg switched to StuG IV in early 1944, and only the Nibelungenwerk in St. Valentin continued with Panzer IV production.

== Variants ==
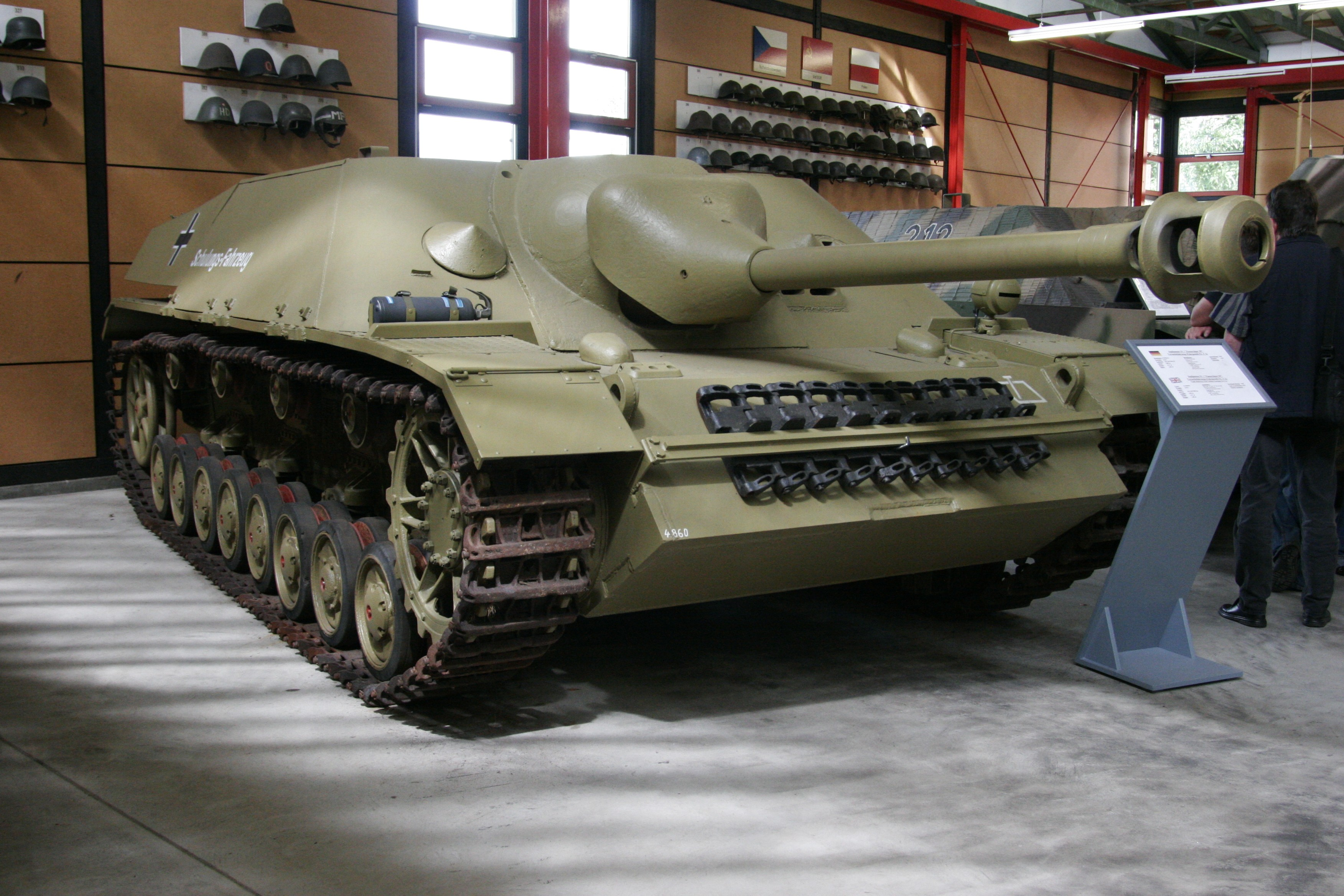
The 0-Serie preproduction vehicle at Deutsches Panzermuseum

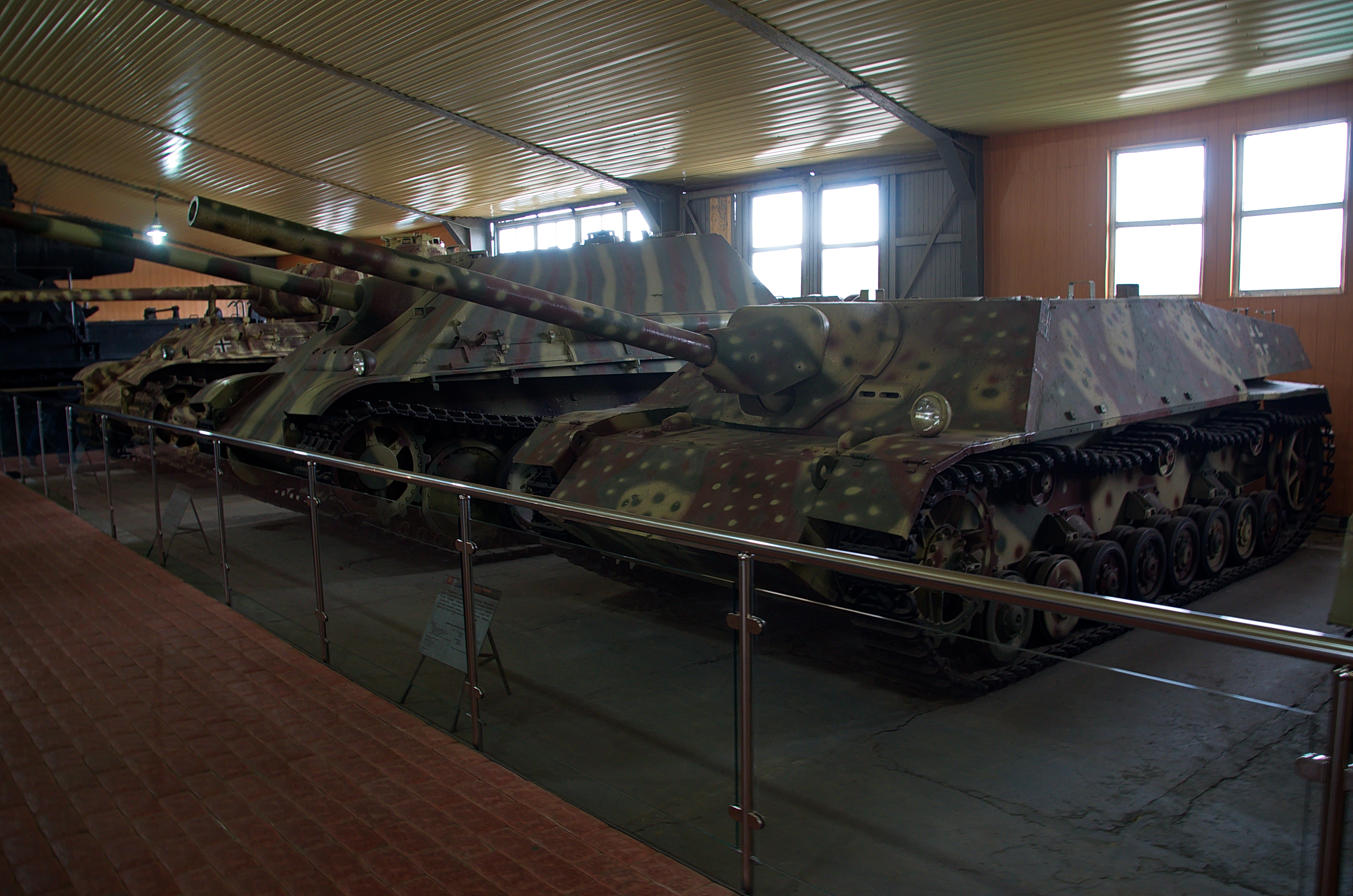
Panzer IV/70 (V) at Kubinka Tank Museum

- Jagdpanzer IV 0-Serie

with 7.5 cm Pak 39 L/43: a small number of these were built as the preproduction (0-Serie) probably in December 1943.

- Jagdpanzer IV (Sd.Kfz.162)

with 7.5 cm Pak 39 L/48, developed under the name Sturmgeschütz neuer Art mit 7.5 cm Pak L/48 auf Fahrgestell PzKpfw IV, with 769–784 produced in January 1944 - November 1944.

- Panzer IV/70 (V) (Sd.Kfz.162/1)

was one of two variants armed with the same Pak 42 L/70 gun. The (V) stands for the designer, Vomag. The most produced version, with 930–940 built in August 1944 - April 1945. Equipped with a long, powerful L/70 7.5cm anti-tank gun that could outrange opposing Allied tank weapons, the Panzer IV/70(V) Lang proved a formidable foe. The "Lang" (German for "long") in its name was added to distinguish it from its predecessor with a shorter L/48 7.5cm gun.

- Panzer IV/70 (A) (Sd.Kfz.162/1)

the other Pak 42 L/70 armed Jagdpanzer IV. In order to send Pak 42 L/70 armed vehicles to the front as soon as possible, in July 1944 Hitler ordered an interim solution to speed up Nibelungenwerke's transition from Panzer IV production to Panzer IV/70 production. "A" stands for Alkett, a manufacturer of the StuG III, that was ordered to redesign the Jagdpanzer IV superstructure to be mounted onto a standard Panzer IV chassis. The Vomag design used a modified chassis permitting a very low silhouette. Mounting the superstructure onto the original Panzer IV chassis required additional vertical steel plates mounted onto the chassis to counter height differences. The resulting vehicle was about 40 cm taller and lacked the sharp edged nose of the Vomag variant. Only 278 were built by Nibelungenwerke from August 1944 to March 1945.

Minor modifications and improvements were made throughout the production runs of all variants, as well as several field improvements, the most common being the addition of armour sideskirts (or in German, Schürzen).

Originally the Jagdpanzer IV's gun had a muzzle brake installed, but because the gun was so close to the ground, each time it was fired, huge dust clouds would betray the vehicle's position, leading many crews to remove the muzzle brake in the field. Later variants dispensed with the muzzle brake.

Early vehicles had zimmerit applied to the hull to protect against magnetic mines, but this was discontinued after about September 1944. Later vehicles had three return rollers rather than the original four, and adopted the twin vertical exhausts typical of the late Panzer IV series.

== Combat history ==
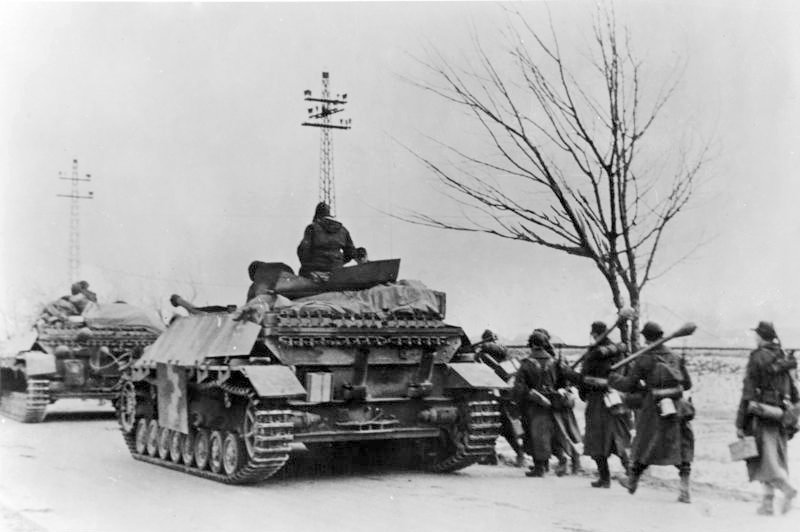
Jagdpanzer IV with infantry support, Hungary, 1944

The Jagdpanzer IV served in the anti-tank sections of Panzer and SS Panzer divisions. The vehicle fought against Western Allied forces in Normandy and the Battle of the Bulge, and Soviet tanks and troops on the Eastern Front. It was very successful as a tank destroyer due to its low profile, accurate gun and good armour protection, but performed poorly when used out of role as a substitute for tanks or assault guns to support infantry. This was increasingly necessary in the later stages of the war from late 1944 to 1945, because there was often nothing else available to the badly depleted German armoured units.

Romania received several Jagdpanzer IV/70 from the Red Army after the war ended. They were officially known as TAs T4 in their army's inventory and were used until 1950 when they were phased out. German armour in Romanian service, including the Jagdpanzer IV, was replaced entirely with Soviet vehicles in 1954. Bulgaria also received Jagdpanzer IVs from both Germany and the Soviet Union (most coming from the latter post-war), and they saw limited service in the postwar Bulgarian military before being stripped of all engine components, dug in and turned into fixed gun emplacements on its border with neighbouring Turkey, as part of the Krali Marko Line (now fallen into disrepair). Most of these ex-German vehicles have been dug up recently, with some scrapped while others await restoration locally or abroad.

Jagdpanzer IV aces include SS-Oberscharführer (Senior squad leader) Rudolf Roy from the 12th SS Panzerjäger Battalion of 12th SS Panzer Division, who was awarded the Knight's Cross of the Iron Cross for battlefield bravery and credited with 36 tank kills. He was killed by an American sniper while looking out of the hatch of his Jagdpanzer IV on December 17, 1944, during the Ardennes Offensive in Belgium, the last major German offensive on the Western Front.

After the war, West Germany continued the Jagdpanzer concept with the Kanonenjagdpanzer, but few other fixed-casemate self-propelled guns were built in the postwar era. An innovative exception was the Swedish Stridsvagn 103, more widely known as the "S-Tank".

Along with Panzer IVs and Sturmgeschütz IIIs, Syria acquired in the 1950s six Jagdpanzer IV L/48s. These were used in the conflicts with Israel up until 1967 when most were either destroyed, abandoned on the Golan Heights overlooking Israel, or scrapped.

== Comparable vehicles ==
- Germany: Hetzer, StuG III, StuG IV
- Italy: Semovente da 75/34
- Japan: Type 3 Ho-Ni III
- Romania: Mareșal
- Soviet Union: SU-85
- United States: M10 GMC
- United Kingdom: Gun Carrier, 3-inch, Mk I, Churchill (A22D)

== Related ==
The Kanonenjagdpanzer (also known as "Jagdpanzer Kanone 90mm", or "tank destroyer, gun") was a German Cold War tank destroyer equipped with a 90mm anti-tank gun from obsolete M47 Patton tanks. Its design was very similar to that of the World War II Jagdpanzer IV.
