= 7.5 cm KwK 42 =

German tank gun

7,5 cm KwK 42 (L/70) 7,5 cm Pak 42
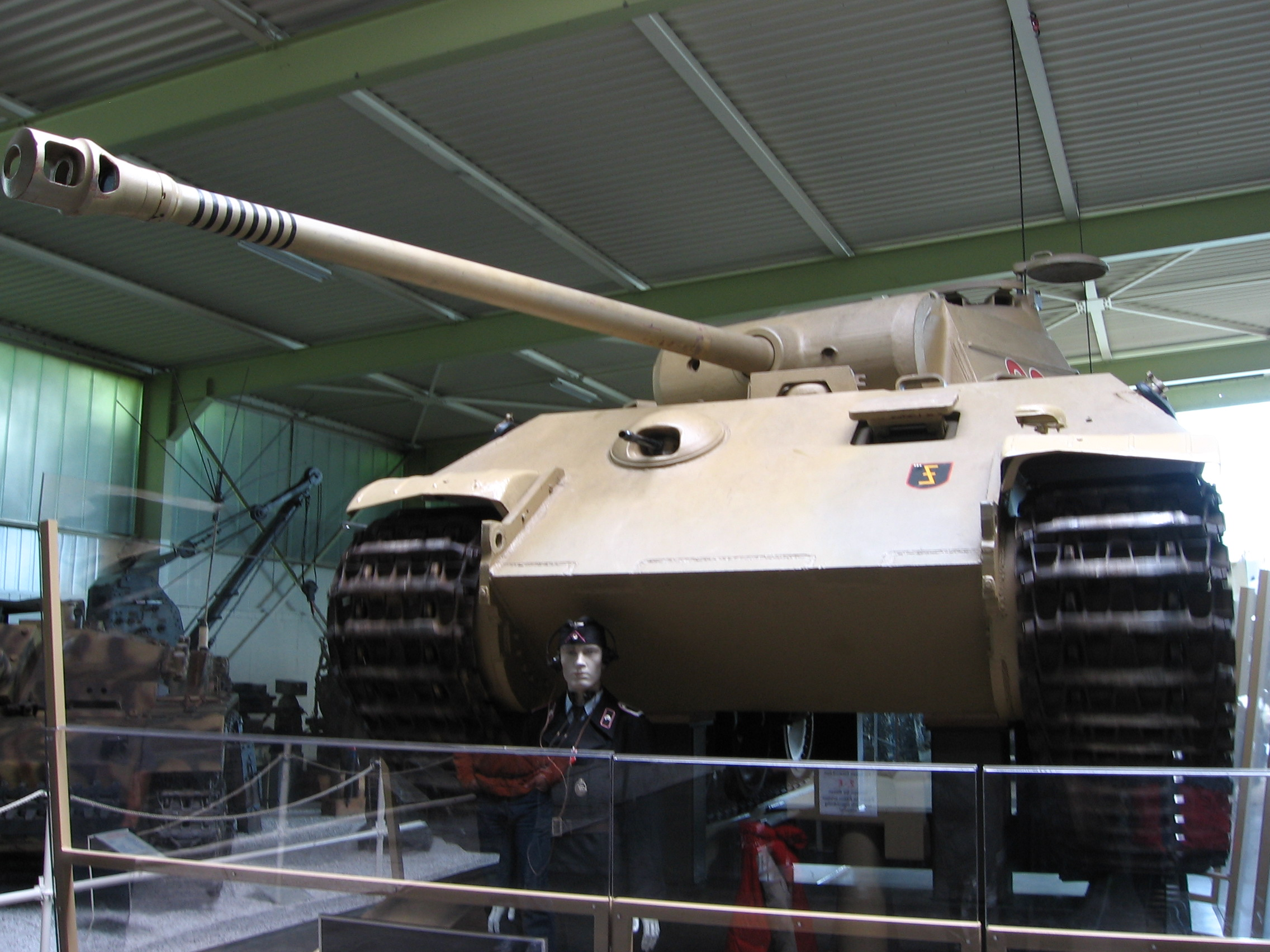
- The 7.5 cm KwK 42 L/70 on a Panther Ausf. A tank
- Type: Tank gun
- Place of origin: Germany

Service history
- Used by: Nazi Germany
- Wars: World War II

Production history
- Designer: Rheinmetall-Borsig AG
- Manufacturer: Rheinmetall-Borsig AG
- Unit cost: 12,000 Reichsmark
- Produced: 1942-45

Specifications
- Mass: 1,000 kg (2,204.6 lb)
- Barrel length: 525 cm (17 ft 3 in) bore (70 calibres)
- Shell: Fixed QF 75 × 640mm R
- Shell weight: 7.2 kg (16 lb) armour-piercing (APCBC-HE) Pzgr 39/42
- Calibre: 75 mm (2.95 in)
- Elevation: -8° to +20°
- Rate of fire: 6-7 rounds per minute
- Muzzle velocity: 935 m/s (3,070 ft/s)
- Maximum firing range: 9,850 m (32,316 ft)

The 7.5 cm KwK 42 L/70 (from 7.5 cm Kampfwagenkanone 42 L/70) was a 7.5 cm calibre German tank gun used on German armoured fighting vehicles in the Second World War. The gun was the armament of the Panther medium tank and two variants of the Jagdpanzer IV self-propelled anti-tank gun. On the latter it was designated as the "7.5 cm Panzerabwehrkanone 42" (7.5 cm Pak 42) anti-tank gun.

== Design ==
The increased muzzle velocity and operating pressure of the new gun required a new armour-piercing projectile to be designed. The Panzergranate 39/42 was the result, and apart from the addition of a second drive band it was otherwise identical to the older 7.5 cm Panzergranate 39. The new projectile increased the weight from 6.8 kg for the old Panzergranate 39, to 7.2 kg for the new Panzergranate 39/42.

The gun was fired electrically, the primer being initiated using an electric current rather than a firing pin. The breech operated semi-automatically so that after the gun had fired, the empty shell casing was automatically ejected, and the falling wedge type breech block remained down so that the next round could be loaded. Once the round was loaded the breech closed automatically and the weapon was ready to be fired again. Three different types of ammunition were developed: APCBC-HE, HE, and APCR, although the latter was extremely rare in service, due to the recall of tungsten to be used in manufacturing instead.

== Data for KwK 42 and Pak 42 ==
- Type: Tank gun (KwK 42), Anti-tank gun (Pak 42)
- Caliber: 7.5 cm (2.95 in)
- Shell: 75×640 mm R
- Barrel length in calibres: 70
- Barrel length: 5.250 m (17 ft 2.7 in)
- Breech: semiautomatic, falling wedge
- Weight with muzzle brake and breech: 1,000 kg (2,200 lb)
- Recoil length: 400 mm (normal), 430 mm (maximum)
- Maximum range: 10 km (6.2 mi) indirect
- Sight: TZF 12 or 12a (Panther), Sfl.ZF 1a (Jagdpanzer IV/70 (A) and (V))

== Ammunition ==
Panzergranate 39/42 (Pzgr. 39/42)

- Type: Armour Piercing Capped Ballistic Cap, High Explosive
- Projectile weight: 6.8 kg (15 lb)
- Explosive filler: 18 g of phlegmatized RDX
- Round weight: 14.3 kg (32 lb)
- Round length: 893.2 mm (2 ft 11.17 in)
- Cartridge case length: 640 mm (2 ft 1 in)
- Muzzle velocity: 935 m/s (3,070 ft/s)

Penetration of an armoured plate 30 degrees from vertical
| Range | 100 m | 500 m | 1000 m | 1500 m | 2000 m |
| Penetration (mm) | 138 | 124 | 112 | 99 | 89 |

Panzergranate 40 (Hk) (Pzgr. 40/42)

- Type: Armour Piercing, Composite Rigid
- Projectile weight: 4.75 kg (10.5 lb)
- Round weight: 11.55 kg (25.5 lb)
- Round length: 875.2 mm (2 ft 10.46 in)
- Cartridge case length: 640 mm (2 ft 1 in)
- Muzzle velocity: 1,130 m/s (3,700 ft/s)

Penetration of an armoured plate 30 degrees from vertical
| Range | 100 m | 500 m | 1000 m | 1500 m | 2000 m |
| Penetration (mm) | 194 | 174 | 149 | 127 | 106 |

Sprenggranate 42 (Sprgr. 42)

- Type: High explosive
- Projectile weight: 12.7 lb (5.8 kg)
- Explosive weight: 1.44 lb (0.65 kg) (2,720 Kilojoules)
- Round weight: 11.14 kg (24.6 lb)
- Round length: 929.2 mm (3 ft 0.58 in)
- Cartridge case length: 640 mm (2 ft 1 in)
- Muzzle velocity: 700 m/s (2,300 ft/s)

== Penetration comparison ==
Calculated penetration (90 degrees) uses American and British 50% success criteria, and allowing direct comparison to foreign gun performance.
| Ammunition type | Muzzle velocity | Penetration (mm) | | | | | | | | | |
| Ammunition type | Muzzle velocity | 100 m | 250 m | 500 m | 750 m | 1000 m | 1250 m | 1500 m | 2000 m | 2500 m | 3000 m |
|---|---|---|---|---|---|---|---|---|---|---|---|
| Pzgr. 39/42 (APCBC) | 935 m/s (3,070 ft/s) | 185 | 179 | 168 | 158 | 149 | 140 | 132 | 116 | 103 | 91 |
| Pzgr. 40/42 (APCR) | 1,130 m/s (3,700 ft/s) | 265 | 253 | 234 | 216 | 199 | 184 | 170 | 145 | 124 | 105 |

== See also ==
Weapons of comparable role, performance and era

- British Ordnance QF 17 pounder
- US 76 mm gun M1
- USSR D-5T 85 mm gun
- Japan Type 5 75 mm tank gun
