= List of German combat vehicles of World War II =

The German Wehrmacht used an extensive variety of combat vehicles during World War II.

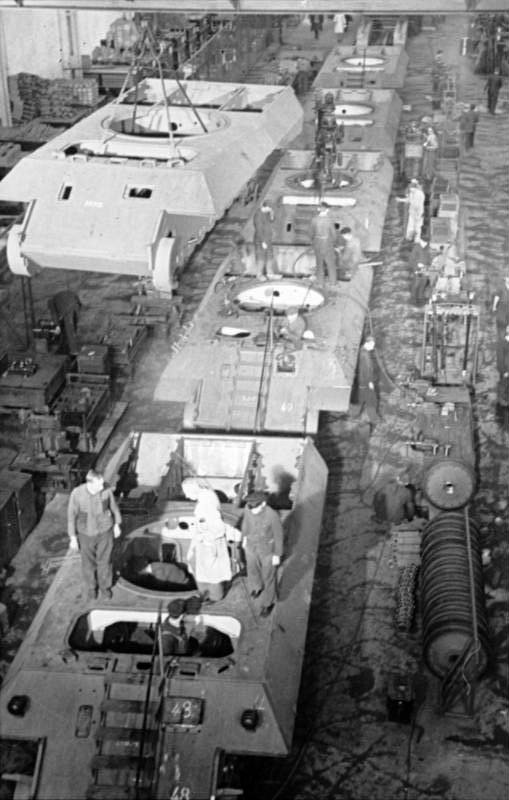
Panther tank production line

== Tanks ==
=== Leichttraktor ===
The VK.31 Leichttraktor ("Light tractor") was an experimental German light fighting tank developed in the 1920s under secret conditions. Only four were produced and they were used in the late 1930s and the early part of the war for training purposes.

=== Panzerkampfwagen I (PzKpfw I) ===
The Panzer I (Sd. Kfz. 101) was not intended as a combat vehicle but rather to familiarise industry and the army with tanks. By the time production ended in 1937, 1,869 Panzer I hulls had been produced, of which 1493 were fitted with turrets. The rest were used as command or training vehicles.

Variants and vehicles using hull:

- Panzerjäger I, a Czech 4.7 cm KPÚV vz. 38 anti-tank gun on Panzer I Ausf.B chassis
- Sturmpanzer I Bison, the 15 cm sIG 33 heavy infantry support gun on a Panzer I Ausf.B chassis
- Flakpanzer I, a 2cm Flak 38 anti-aircraft cannon on Panzer I Ausf.A chassis
- kleiner Panzerbefehlswagen, an armoured command vehicle on Panzer I Ausf.B chassis

=== Panzerkampfwagen II (PzKpfw II) ===
The Panzer II (Sd. Kfz. 121) was a light tank designed to replace the Panzer I. It was armed with a 20 mm cannon, which had some capability against other armoured vehicles. Before the war started, 1,223 had been built.

Variants:

PzKpfw II Flamm, (Sd. Kfz. 122), Flamingo
flamethrower tank (Ausfuhrung A and B)
Luchs
Light reconnaissance tank
Marder II
7.5 cm Pak 40 anti-tank gun on Panzer II chassis (Sd. Kfz. 131)
Marder II
captured Russian 76.2 mm anti-tank gun on Panzer II Ausf. D/E chassis (Sd. Kfz. 132)
Wespe
105 mm light field howitzer on Panzer II chassis (Sd. Kfz. 124)

=== Panzer 35(t) ===
In March 1939, Germany occupied and annexed the Bohemia and Moravia region of Czechoslovakia taking over the Czech arms manufacturing industries. The Czech LT-35 tank was given the German designation Panzer 35(t), with "t" standing for tschechisch (the German word for Czech).

=== Panzer 38(t) ===
Also known as: PzKpfw 38(t), Panzer 38(t), Sd. Kfz. 140
In March 1939, Germany invaded Czech territory and took over the Czech arms manufacturing industries. The Czech LT-38 tank, then in production, was produced for German use as the Panzer 38(t) ("t" standing for tschechisch, German for Czech). By the start of the war, 78 Panzer 38(t) tanks had been produced.

Germany continued producing the Panzer 38(t) during the war. By early 1942, it was clearly obsolete. However, the production lines were already running, the vehicle was mechanically reliable, and the factory would have had difficulty moving over to larger tanks, so it was decided to find other uses for the Panzer 38(t) chassis for self-propelled guns.

Variants:

- Marder 138 (Marder III) = 75 mm Pak 40 gun on Panzer 38(t) chassis (Sd. Kfz. 138)
- Marder 139 (Marder III)= captured Russian 76.2 mm gun on Panzer 38(t) chassis (Sd. Kfz. 139)
- Grille = 150 mm heavy infantry gun on Panzer 38(t) chassis (Sd.Kfz. 138/1)
- Jagdpanzer 38 = 75 mm L/48 Pak39 gun on a widened Pz 38(t) chassis
- Flakpanzer 38(t) = 2cm FlaK self-propelled anti-aircraft gun on Panzer 38(t) chassis (Sd. Kfz. 140)

=== Panzer III ===
Also known as: PzKpfw III, 'Panzer III', Sd. Kfz. 141
The Panzer III was designed as a medium tank, with a high-velocity 37 mm gun. Pre-war production was 98 vehicles. During the war, the Pz III was upgunned to a 50 mm L/42 gun, then to an even higher velocity 50 mm L/60 gun, in order to improve its anti-tank performance. A low-velocity 75 mm gun was also fitted (using the same mount as the early Panzer IV), but since the tank was not large enough to fit a high-velocity 75 mm gun, production was halted mid-war, although the chassis continued to be used to build assault guns.

The Panzer III was the first tank to have a 3-man turret: the commander did not have to double up as a loader or a gunner, so he could concentrate on commanding the tank.

Variants:

- Panzer III A-F= armed with 37 mm L/45 gun
- Panzer III F-M = armed with 50 mm L/42 or L/60 gun
- Panzer III N = armed with 75 mm L/24 gun, used for Infantry support
- Panzer III (f) = armed with flamethrower
- Sturmgeschütz III = Sturmgeschütz 40= Assault Gun armed with 75 mm L/24 (A-E), later with L/43 (F) and L/48 gun (F8 & G) (Sd. Kfz. 142)
- StuH 42 = Sturmhaubitze 42. StuG III with 105 mm light field howitzer (Sd. Kfz. 142/2)

=== Panzer IV ===
Also known as: PzKpfw IV, 'Panzer IV', Sd. Kfz. 161
Panzer IV was designed alongside the Panzer III. The Panzer IV was a slightly larger and heavier tank, and with its large calibre low velocity gun, it was designed to support the Panzer III when it met heavy resistance from infantry support. Pre-war production was 211 tanks. Originally armed with a low-velocity 75 mm L/24 gun, in 1942 this was upgraded to a 75 mm L/43 gun, and 1943 to a 75 mm L/48 gun.

Variants:

- Panzer IV A-F1 = Panzer IV with 75 mm L/24 gun
- Panzer IV F2-J = Panzer IV with 75 mm L/43 or L/48 gun
- Sturmgeschütz IV = Assault Gun. Superstructure of Sturmgeschütz III on Panzer IV chassis; armed with 75 mm L/48 gun (Sd. Kfz. 167)
- Jagdpanzer IV = Tank Destroyer with 75 mm L/48, later L/70, gun on Panzer IV chassis (Sd. Kfz. 162)
- Sturmpanzer IV Brummbär with 150 mm field howitzer on Panzer IV chassis (Sd. Kfz. 166)
- Hummel = 150 mm field howitzer on Geschützwagen III/IV chassis (Sd. Kfz. 165)
- Hornisse = 88 mm Pak43/1 auf Geschützwagen III/IV, later known as Nashorn (Sd. Kfz. 164)
- Möbelwagen = Self-propelled anti-aircraft. 37 mm Flak 43 L/89 on Panzer IV chassis (Flakpanzer IV Sd. Kfz.161/3)
- Wirbelwind = Self-propelled anti-aircraft. Quadruple 20 mm Flak 38 L/112.5 guns on Panzer IV chassis, with armoured turret (Flakpanzer IV)
- Ostwind = Self-propelled anti-aircraft. 37 mm Flak 43 L/89 on Panzer IV chassis, with armoured turret (Flakpanzer IV)
- Kugelblitz = Self-propelled anti-aircraft gun. 30mm MK 103 twin anti-aircraft gun on Panzer IV chassis, with armoured turret (Flakpanzer IV)

=== Panzerkampfwagen V "Panther" ===
The Panther, also known as "PzKpfw V", "Panzer V", and Sd. Kfz. 171, was a medium tank of the German Army in the second part of World War II. Until 1944, it was designated as the PzKpfw V Panther. The production Panther was a direct response to the Soviet T-34, after encountering difficulties fighting the T-34, Colonel General Heinz Guderian (the "Inspector of Panzer Troops") suggested simply copying the T-34; although the report of the enquiry recommended that the main attributes of the T-34 - armament, sloped armor and suspension - be incorporated into a new German medium weight tank under the Vollketten 30 project. Two proposals - by Daimler-Benz and Maschinenfabrik Augsburg-Nürnberg (MAN) - were examined and the MAN design selected for production.

Variants:

- Panther Ausf. D - first production version, armed with 75 mm KwK 42 L/70 gun. 842 built
- Panther Ausf. A - second production version, improved Ausf. D, 2,200 built
- Panther Ausf. G - additional armour, approx 2,900 built
- Jagdpanther - a Jagdpanzer (tank destroyer) design with an 88 mm L/71 PaK 43 gun on Panzer V chassis (Sd. Kfz. 173)
- Panther Ausf. F - a Panther development with narrow front Schmalturm turret, none built
- Bergepanther = an armoured recovery vehicle, 339 built

=== Panther II ===
Panther II tank successor tank to the Panther while visually similar, was planned to use a new turret, longer 75mm gun, thicker armour, new engine and different components from the Tiger and Tiger II. Only one chassis was built and was later fitted with an Ausf G turret

=== Panzer VI Ausf. E "Tiger" ===
Also known as: PzKpfw VI E, 'Panzer VI E', Tiger I, Sd. Kfz. 181
The Tiger I (Panzer VI Ausf.H, later renamed later Panzer VI Ausf.E ) was armed with an 88 mm L/56 gun. On May 26, 1941 Hitler ordered the Henschel and Porsche firms to design a new heavy tank to be delivered in 1942. Porsche used their existing VK 30.01 (P) Leopard design while Henschel based theirs on their earlier VK 36.01 (H). The Henschel design won the competition and became the Tiger. A few Porsche Tigers were made, with a different chassis and hybrid gasoline-electric powerplant, but these were not as reliable as the Henschel model. Many of the Porsche chassis were converted into tank destroyers, known as Ferdinand then rebuilt as Elefant

Variant:

- Sturmtiger was armed with a 380 mm rocket.

=== Panzer VI Ausf. B "Königstiger" ===
Also known as: PzKpfw VIB, 'Panzer VIB', Tiger II, King Tiger, Royal Tiger, Sd. Kfz. 182
The Panzerkampfwagen VI Tiger II Ausf. B "Königstiger" (Sd. Kfz.182) / VK4503(H) was a heavy tank in the later half of World War II. Armed with an 88 mm L/71 gun, the vehicle could perform well in the defensive role on the eastern and western fronts but was an expensive failure for Nazi Germany when used in an offensive role as a main battle tank. The Tiger II combined one of the most capable AT guns of the period with heavy armour, but had an over-burdened engine and lacked reliability.

Variant:

- Jagdtiger was armed with a 128 mm L/55 Pak44 gun (Sd. Kfz. 186)

=== Panzer VII "Löwe" ===
Panzer VII Löwe was a proposed superheavy tank design. It never left the drawing board.

=== Panzer VIII "Maus" ===
Also known as: "Panzer VIII", 'Maus'
Panzer VIII Maus was a German 188t super heavy tank. Two prototypes were built and only one prototype got a turret.

== Self-propelled artillery ==
- Wespe - 105 mm howitzer built on Panzer II chassis
- Grille - 150 mm heavy infantry gun built on Panzer 38(t) chassis, sometimes wrongly named "Bison".
- Hummel - The Hummel was a self-propelled artillery piece fielding a 150 mm howitzer on a chassis that combined features of both the Panzer III and Panzer IV. 714 Hummels plus 150 Hummel ammunition carriers were built from 1943 to 1944.
- Heuschrecke - The Heuschrecke was a self-propelled artillery piece with a 10.5cm leFH 18/1 L/28 on a Panzer IV chassis. Production never started as it would have affected production of tanks.

== Self-propelled anti-aircraft artillery ==
Several types of armored self-propelled anti-aircraft weapons ("flakpanzers" in German) were used in the war.

- Flakpanzer I, a converted version of the, Panzer I tank.
- Flakpanzer 38(t), based on the Panzer 38(t) light tank
- Flakpanzer IV, the general designation for a series of vehicles based on the Panzerkampfwagen IV medium tank chassis, including the:
  - Möbelwagen
  - Wirbelwind
  - Ostwind
  - Kugelblitz, in prototype stage at the end of World War II

== Assault guns ==
An assault gun is an armoured fighting vehicle similar to a tank, but typically does not have a rotating turret, and may have an open roof. The removal of the turret allows for a much larger gun to be carried on a smaller chassis. They are not intended to fight other AFVs, but instead directly support infantry during assaults on prepared positions. However they were still often fitted with AT guns to destroy AFVs.

During World War II Germany built many more assault guns than tanks, because of their relative cheapness and simplicity.

Sturmgeschütz III
built on the Panzer III chassis

Sturmgeschütz IV
built on the Panzer IV chassis with 75 mm gun

Sturmpanzer IV ("Brummbär")
with 150 mm gun built on the Panzer IV chassis

Sturmtiger
built on repaired Tiger I chassis, 380 mm rocket projector

== Tank destroyers ==
Panzerjäger I
built on the Panzer I chassis

Jagdpanzer 38
built on modified Panzer 38(t) chassis

Jagdpanzer IV
built on the Panzer IV chassis

Jagdpanther
built on the Panzer V chassis

Marder I
built on chassis of captured French and some Polish tanks
Marder II
built on the Panzer II chassis
Marder III
built on the Panzer 38(t) chassis

Nashorn

Jagdtiger
based on the Tiger II

Elefant
The Elefant (Sd. Kfz. 184) used the chassis of Porsche's losing entry for the Tiger I competition. On top of this chassis, a forward-facing 88 mm L/71 gun was mounted. A total of 90 Elefants were produced, all in early 1943 and known then as the Ferdinand, after its designer, Dr Ferdinand Porsche. Those still in use in late 1943 were modified and renamed Elefant.

== Half-tracks ==
- Maultier - "mule" conversions of trucks to half tracks
- Sd.Kfz. 2
- Sd.Kfz. 4
- Sd.Kfz. 6
- Sd.Kfz. 7
- Sd.Kfz. 8
- Sd.Kfz. 9
- Sd.Kfz. 10
- Sd.Kfz. 11
- Sd.Kfz. 250
- Sd.Kfz. 251

== Armoured cars ==
- Kfz 13
- Leichter Panzerspähwagen - 4 wheeled armoured cars
  - Sd.Kfz. 221
  - Sd.Kfz. 222
  - Sd.Kfz. 223
- Schwerer Panzerspähwagen - 6 and 8 wheel armoured cars
  - Sd.Kfz. 231
  - Sd.Kfz. 232
  - Sd.Kfz. 233
  - Sd.Kfz. 234
  - Sd.Kfz. 263
- Panzerwagen ADGZ - Austrian armoured car used for police work

== Armoured recovery vehicle ==
- Bergepanzer III - PzKpfw III chassis
- Bergepanzer IV - PzKpfw IV chassis
- Bergepanther (Sd.Kfz. 179) - PzKpfw V Panther chassis 347 produced (1943 to 1945).
- Bergetiger - PzKpfw VI Tiger I chassis
- Bergepanzer 38(t) - Jagdpanzer 38 chassis, 170 produced (1944 to 1945).
- Bergepanzer T-34 - Captured T-34 chassis

== Sd. Kfz. numbers ==
Sd.Kfz. stood for Sonder Kraftfahrzeug or ‘special-purpose vehicle'. Sd.Kfz. designations were assigned to armoured vehicles and other vehicles put in military service for a specific purpose. The system was used by Germany prior to and throughout World War II.

- Sd. Kfz. 100s for PzKpfw I versions
- Sd. Kfz. 120s for PzKpfw II versions
- Sd. Kfz. 140s for PzKpfw III versions
- Sd. Kfz. 160s for PzKpfw IV versions
- Sd. Kfz. 170s for PzKpfw V versions
- Sd. Kfz. 180s for PzKpfw VI versions
- Sd. Kfz. 1s, 10s, and 200s for half-tracks and armoured cars

== Country codes for adopted foreign equipment ==
- a – United States (Amerika)
- b – Belgium (Belgien)
- e – United Kingdom (England)
- f – France (example: Panzerkampfwagen S35 739 (f))
- j – Yugoslavia (Jugoslawien)
- h – Netherlands (Holland)
- i – Italy (Italien)
- ö – Austria (Österreich)
- p – Poland (Polen)
- r – Soviet Union (Russland, ‘Russia’) (example: Panzerkampfwagen T-34 747 (r))
- t – Czechoslovakia (Tschechoslowakei), for example, Panzerkampfwagen 35(t)

== See also ==
- German armoured fighting vehicle production during World War II
- Comparison of early World War II tanks
- Tanks in the German Army
- Jagdpanzer
- Tanks Break Through!
