= 40M Nimród =

Hungarian self-propelled anti-aircraft gun of WWII

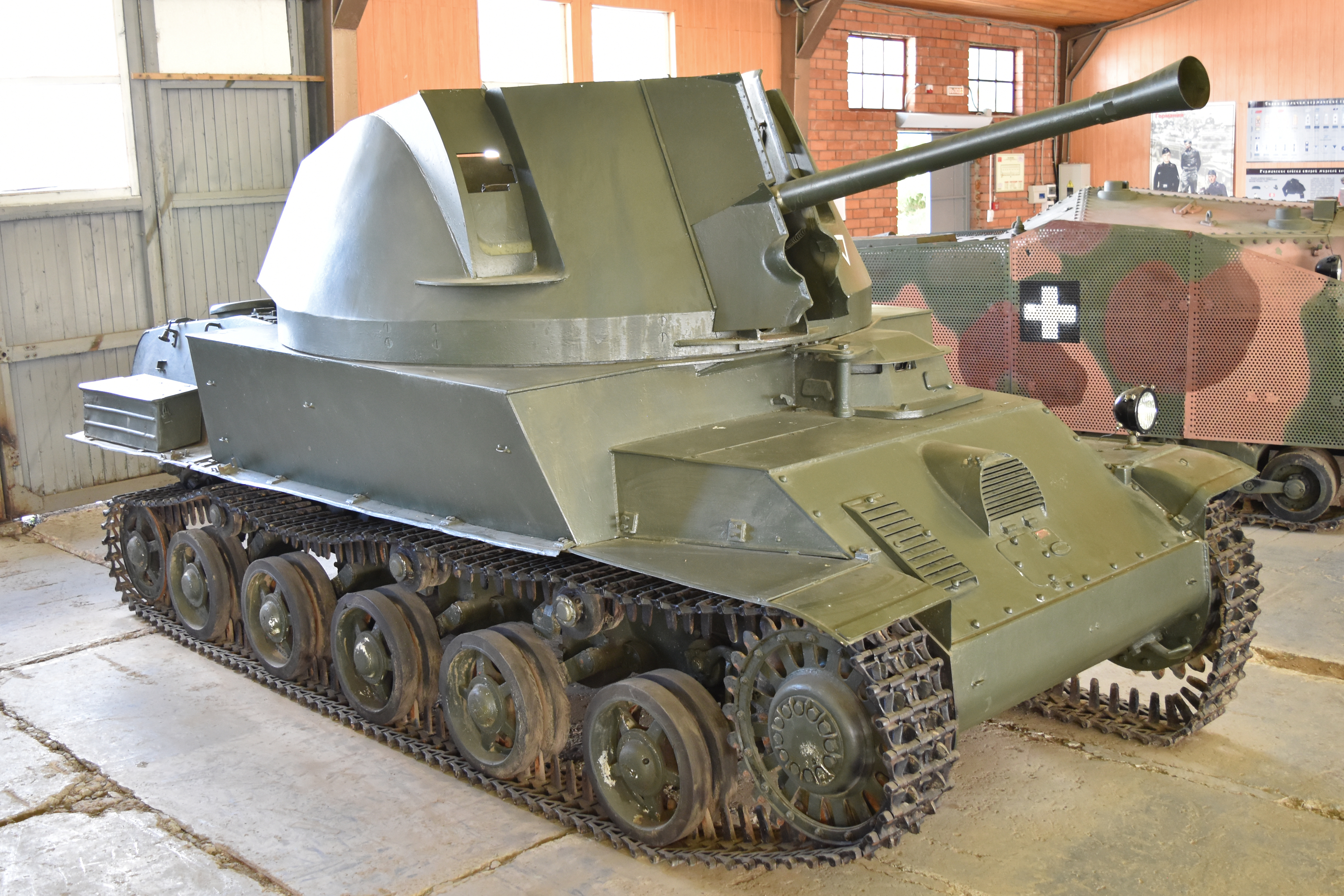
- 40M Nimród I in the Kubinka Tank Museum
- Type: Self-propelled anti-aircraft gun
- Place of origin: Hungary

Service history
- In service: October 1941 – February 1945
- Used by: Hungary
- Wars: World War II

Production history
- Designed: 1938-1940
- Manufacturer: Weiss Manfréd; MÁVAG
- Developed from: Landsverk L-62 Anti
- Developed into: 43M Lehel
- No. built: 135

Specifications
- Mass: 10.9 tonnes
- Length: 5.32 m (17 ft 5 in)
- Width: 2.3 m (7 ft 7 in)
- Height: 2.8 m (9 ft 2 in)
- Crew: 6
- Armor: 6–13 mm on the hull, 28 mm on the turret
- Main armament: 40 mm Bofors L/60 AA-gun
- Engine: VIII EST 107, 8-cylinder, gasoline, water-cooled 155 hp (115 kW)
- Power/weight: 15.2 hp/t
- Ground clearance: 350 mm (14 in)
- Fuel capacity: 250 L (55 imp gal; 66 US gal)
- Operational range: 225 km (140 mi) (road); 150 km (93 mi) (cross-country)
- Maximum speed: 50 km/h (31 mph)

The 40M Nimród was a World War II Hungarian license-built modification of the Swedish Landsverk L-62 Anti I self-propelled anti-aircraft gun, featuring components from the Hungarian 38M Toldi (a license-built Landsverk L-60) and a new turret. Originally, it was intended to be used both in the anti-aircraft and tank destroyer roles, but it proved to be ineffective against heavily armored Soviet tanks, like the KV-1. Therefore, it was primarily used against lightly armored vehicles and for air defense.

== Development history ==
=== Origins ===
On 3 December 1936 representatives of the Royal Hungarian Army were shown a film presentation of the Landsverk L-60 tank and the Landsverk L-62 Anti I SPAAG by AB Landsverk. József Somkuthy, the Chief of Staff of the Royal Hungarian Army, was particularly impressed with the L-62, envisioning it as a mobile support unit. A Hungarian military committee was dispatched to Landskrona to determine if the L-60 and L-62 would meet Hungarian requirements and if the vehicles could be produced domestically. With the L-60 being developed into the 38M Toldi.

The chassis of the L-62 was similar to the L-60, though it had five pairs of roadwheels instead of four. As a result the chassis was 66cm longer. The vehicle had a cramped driver's compartment, and the driver could only exit the vehicle by first removing the steering wheel.

The vehicle's gravity fed Bofors 40 mm L/60 gun, designated as the 40mm 36M in Hungarian service, allowed it to achieve a rate of fire of 120 to 140 rounds per minute depending on the firing angle. It fired conventional ammunition at a muzzle velocity of almost 900 metres per second (3,000 feet per second). Ammunition for the gun consisted primarily of conventional high-explosive fragmentation and armor-piercing rounds, but also a specialized anti-tank round developed indigenously in Hungary. Hungarian armor-piercing ammunition for the gun could penetrate 46 mm (1.8 in) of rolled homogeneous armor at a range of 100 m (330 ft), and 30 mm (1.2 in) at 1,000 m (3,300 ft). The Nimród carried 640 rounds, split into 4 stowage areas that had 160 rounds each.

=== Trials ===
Following the positive recommendations of the committee the licence for the L-62, along with a single example, were purchased by the MÁVAG factories. The example L-62 arrived in Hungary in December 1938, and was given the hull number H-005. The vehicle arrived without armament, but was soon fitted with a domestically produced 40mm Bofors anti-aircraft gun. The vehicle then underwent trials on 30 March 1939.

The tests were generally positive about the L-62, though some recommendations were made. A fifth crew member was added to the turret to assist the gunner, bringing the crew total to six. Due to the increase in the size of the turret crew it became necessary to increase the size of the turret. The turret's height was also increased by 28cm to assist with protecting the crew against aerial attacks. There were also requests made at the time for a simpler sight to assist with engaging ground targets. This last request was rejected, as it would make the vehicle unable to engage aerial targets.

Following the changes made to the design the vehicle was accepted into service in May 1940.The Ministry of Defence ordered 46 Nimróds in September 1940 The first batch, which would retroactively be designated 40M Nimród I, were powered by a Büssing-NAG L8V/36TR engine. The second batch of 89 Nimróds ordered would instead by powered by the domestically produced Ganz VIII. VGT 107 engine. These would be designated as 40M Nimród II. The first domestically produced Nimród, hull number H-055, was completed in October 1941.

== Service history ==
=== Operations in the Soviet Union ===
In the summer of 1942 18 Nimród Is of the 51st Battalion (Note: The 51st Battalion is referred to across English language sources as the 51st SPAA Battalion, 51st Heavy Armour Battalion, 51st Anti-Tank Battalion, and 51st Tank Destroyer Battalion. It is unclear among the various sources which is the correct designation. In October 1942 the unit was renammed the 51st Armoured Autocannon Battalion.) of the 1st Hungarian Armored Division were deployed along the Don. The first few months reports indicated that the Nimród performed well in the anti-aircraft role. For example, during the fighting south of the Battle of Voronezh, in Korotoyak, Nimróds of the 51st Battalion shot down between 38 and 40 Soviet aircraft. The Battalion's Nimróds painted white kill rings on the barrel to represent each destroyed aircraft, and red rings for destroyed tanks.

However, the Nimród was not performing as well in the anti-tank role. Whilst it worked well against lighter tanks, such as the T-60 or M3 Stuart, it struggled against heavier tanks like the KV-1 and T-34. In 1943 the 40M Nimród was reclassified for anti-aircraft use, as it was unable to penetrate the thick armor of the tanks in use by the Red Army by that point.

By 4 February 1943 only two of the Nimróds sent to the Don were still operational. Both were destroyed by their crews in Korotscha on 7 February 1943 after having run into a ditch, and not being able to be recovered. From autumn 1943 onwards, Nimróds were handed over in plain olive green instead of camouflage.

Starting in 1943, the vehicle was issued with a 150 mm (5.9 in) muzzle loaded shaft grenade (German: "Stielgranate") designated 42M. This was a German Stielgranate 41 which had been modified to be mounted on the 40 mm 36M gun instead of the German 3.7 cm Pak 36. It consisted of a German 15 cm hollow charge artillery shell (I.Gr. 39 Hl/A, German: "Infantrie Granate 39 Hohlladung/A") mounted on a fin-stabilized tube meant to fit over the muzzle of the gun, and was launched by the use of a specialized blank cartridge loaded in the main gun. The 42M is often found under the name "Kerngranate", which is German for Core Shell.

=== Operations in Hungary and Romania ===
Following the first air raid on Budapest on 4 April 1944, Nimróds of the 51st Armoured Autocannon Battalion were used in dug in positions against bombing raids behind the frontline in Hungary. This would last until August 1944 when, due to the heavy pressure from the joint Soviet-Romanian Bucharest–Arad Operation, it was sent back to the frontlines. 27 Nimróds of the 1st Armoured Division took part in the Hungarian capture of Arad on 13 September 1944. Of those 27, nine were directly imbedded in medium-tank companies, while the other 18 were part of the 51st Armoured Autocannon Battalion. The 1st Armoured Division continued its attack against the Romanian 19th Infantry Division until 18 September 1944, when a Soviet counter-attack drove the unit to the Dombegyház-Battonya defensive line.

Four Nimróds took part in the counter-attack from the Baracska-Pettend line on 7 December 1944 as part of the Horváth Battle Group. By 10 December 1944 none of the Battle Group's Nimróds were still in operational condition. As of 24 January 1945, the 2nd Armoured Division had nine Nimróds, with only four being in operational condition.

=== Operational Units ===
Of the total 135 Nimrods, most of were deployed by the 51st and 52nd Armored Autocannon Battalions of the 1st and 2nd Hungarian Armoured Divisions, respectively. Tank destroyer companies attached to armoured and motorised units consisted of four Nimróds and one command Toldi.

The following units used the 40M Nimród:

- 51st Armoured Autocannon Battalion, 1st Hungarian Armoured Division
- 52nd Armoured Autocannon Battalion, 2nd Hungarian Armoured Division
- 15th Bicycle Battalion, 1st Hungarian Cavalry Division
- 3rd Motorised Rifle Battalion (Aszód)
- 102nd Independent Tank Company

== Variants ==
Comparison 40M Nimród of variants
Version	Main gun	Hull Armour mm (inch)			Frontal Turret Armour mm (inch)	Weight tonnes (long tons; short tons)	Engine	Overall Length meters (feet)	Crew
Version	Main gun	F	S	R	Frontal Turret Armour mm (inch)	Weight tonnes (long tons; short tons)	Engine	Overall Length meters (feet)	Crew
40M Nimród I	40mm 36M Légvédelmi Gépágyú	10–13 (0.39–0.51)	10 (0.39)	7 (0.28)	28 (1.1)	11 (11; 12)	Büssing NAG Type L8V/36TR; 157 PS (155 hp; 115 kW)	5.32 (17.5)	6
40M Nimród II	40mm 36M Légvédelmi Gépágyú	10–13 (0.39–0.51)	10 (0.39)	7 (0.28)	28 (1.1)	11 (11; 12)	Ganz VIII. VGT 107; 157 PS (155 hp; 115 kW)	5.32 (17.5)	6
43M Lehel	1x 8mm 31M Machine Gun	10–13 (0.39–0.51)	10 (0.39)	7 (0.28)	No Turret	11 (11; 12)	Büssing NAG Type L8V/36TR; 157 PS (155 hp; 115 kW)	4.9 (16)	1+8

=== 43M Lehel ===
In 1942 the Hungarian Ministry of Defence requested the domestic production of an Armoured personnel carrier. The 40M Nimród was used as the basis for the new APC, named the 43M Lehel. Two prototypes were developed; the Lehel A (a troop transport with space for eight infantry), and the Lehel S (a medical transport with capacity for four stretchers). The prototype, built on Nimród hull H-005, was completed on 15 July 1943. The Ministry of Defence ordered nine Nimród be converted into Lehels, and ordered another 28 built. However, due to the increasing shortage of combat vehicles of all kinds in frontline units, neither prototype went into full scale production. At least five Lehels may have been built using damaged Nimród hulls, though these reports have not been confirmed.

== Survivors ==
There exist at least two surviving 40M Nimróds. The Nimród with the registration number 1H-631 was stored in the Institute and Museum of Military History in Budapest. It was put on display in 2018. It had previously been displayed during the 1960s, an oddity for eastern bloc nations at the time.

The other survivor, registration number H-094, is on display in the Kubinka Tank Museum in Russia.

== Gallery ==
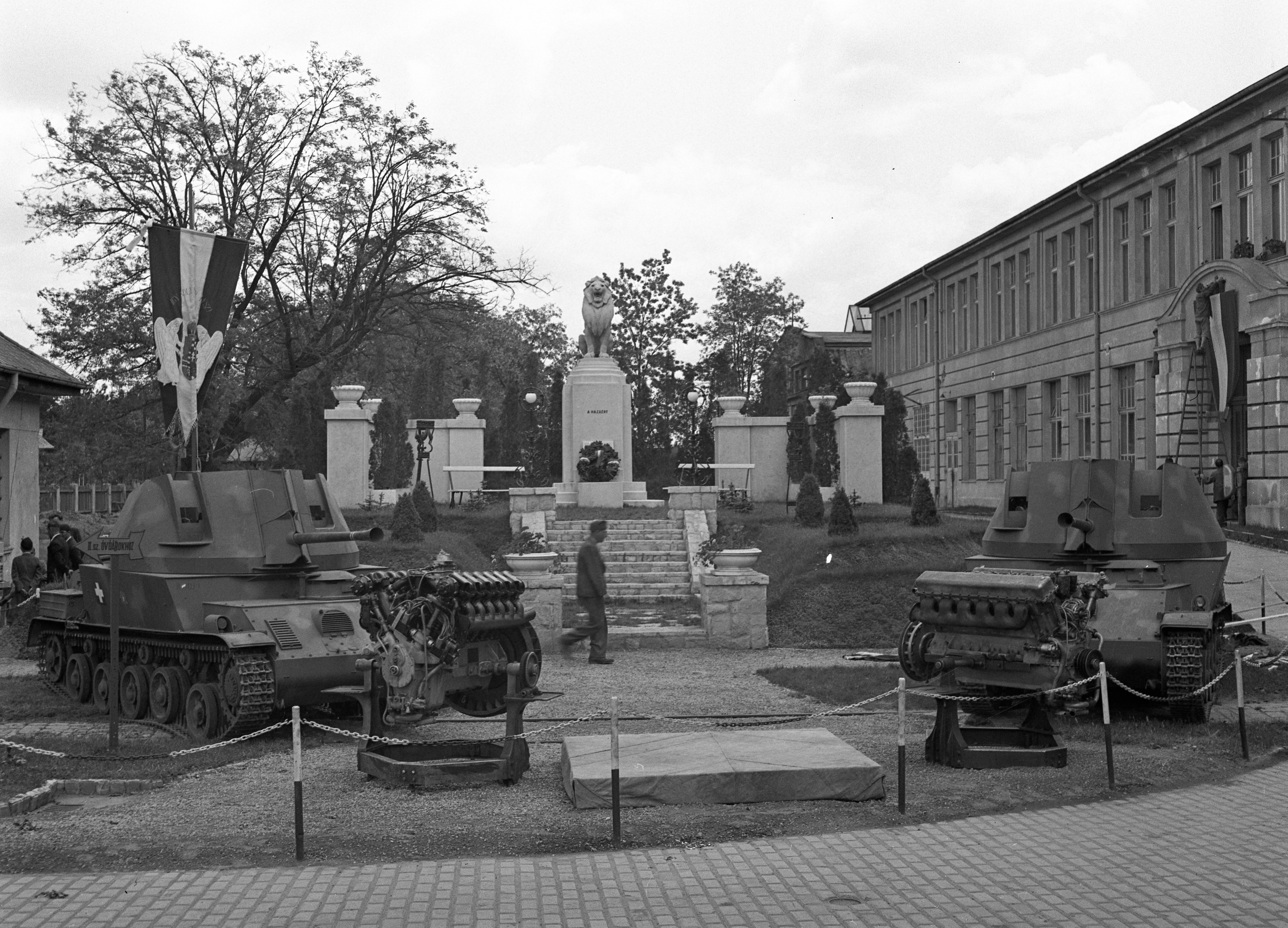
Nimróds at military demonstration, Mátyásföld, Budapest, 27 July 1943. In front of the Nimróds are two captured T-34 engines.

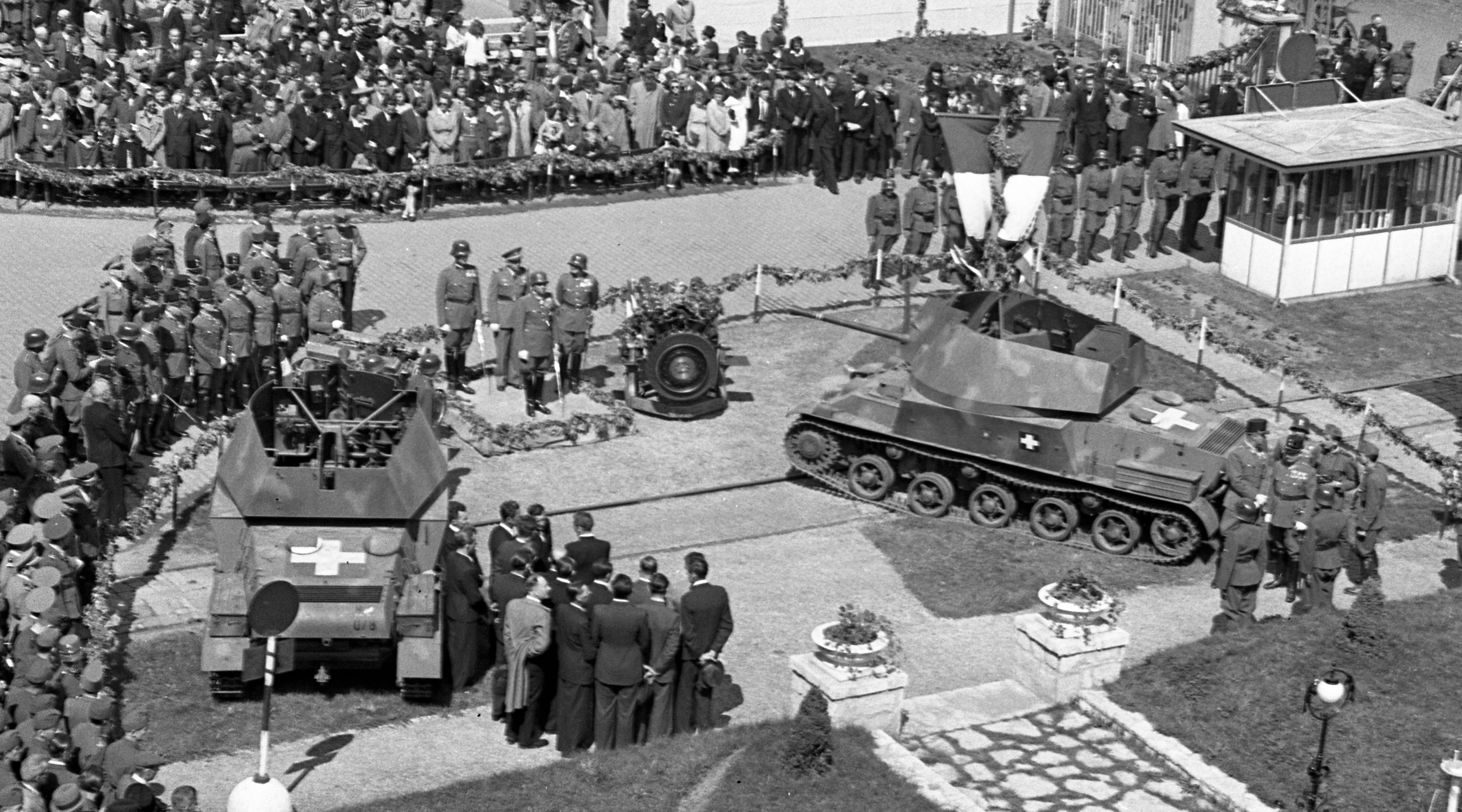
Nimróds from above, Mátyásföld, Budapest, 27 July 1943

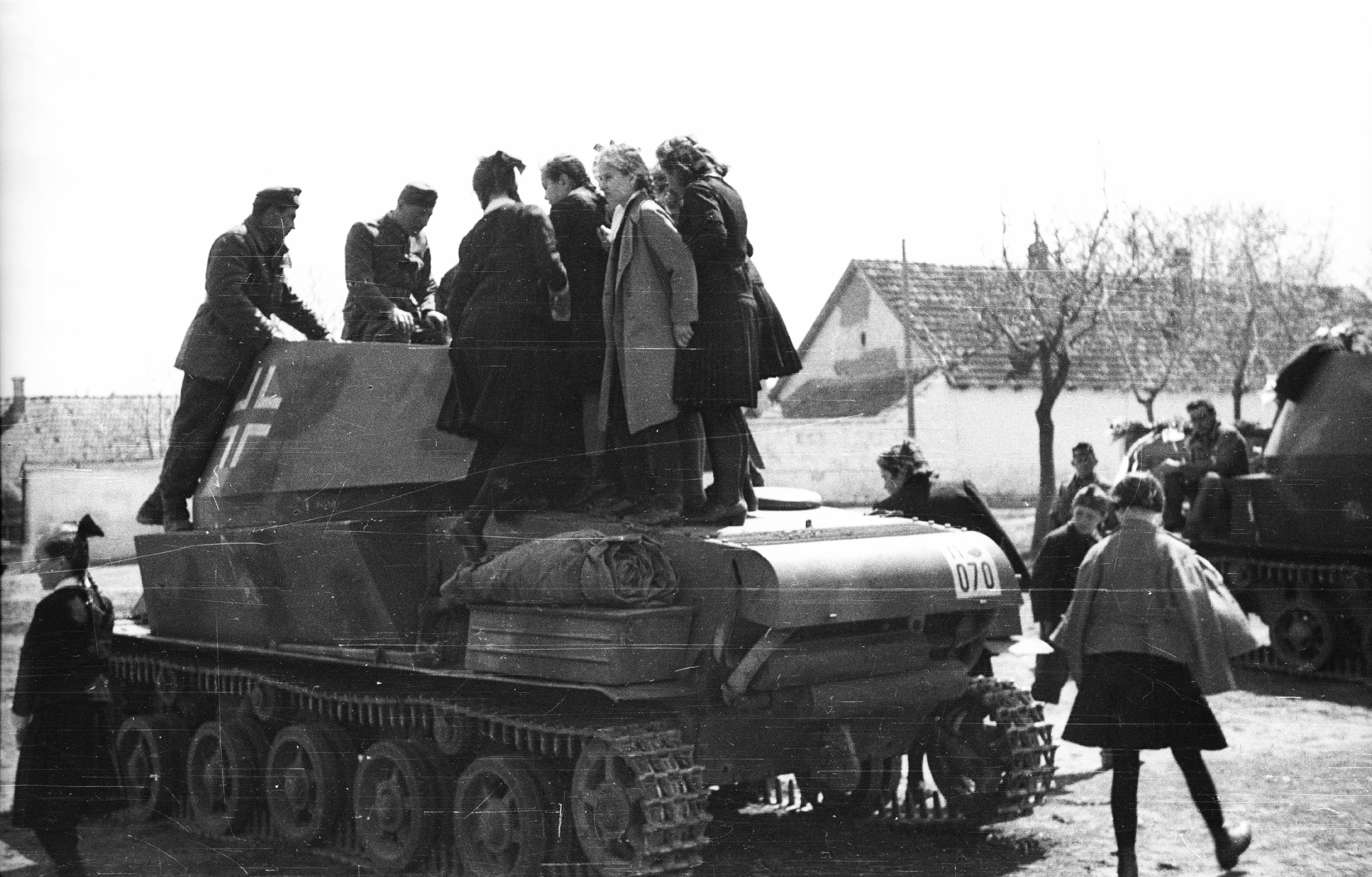
A 40M Nimród. In the background is Nicholas Zichy Square in Zsámbék.

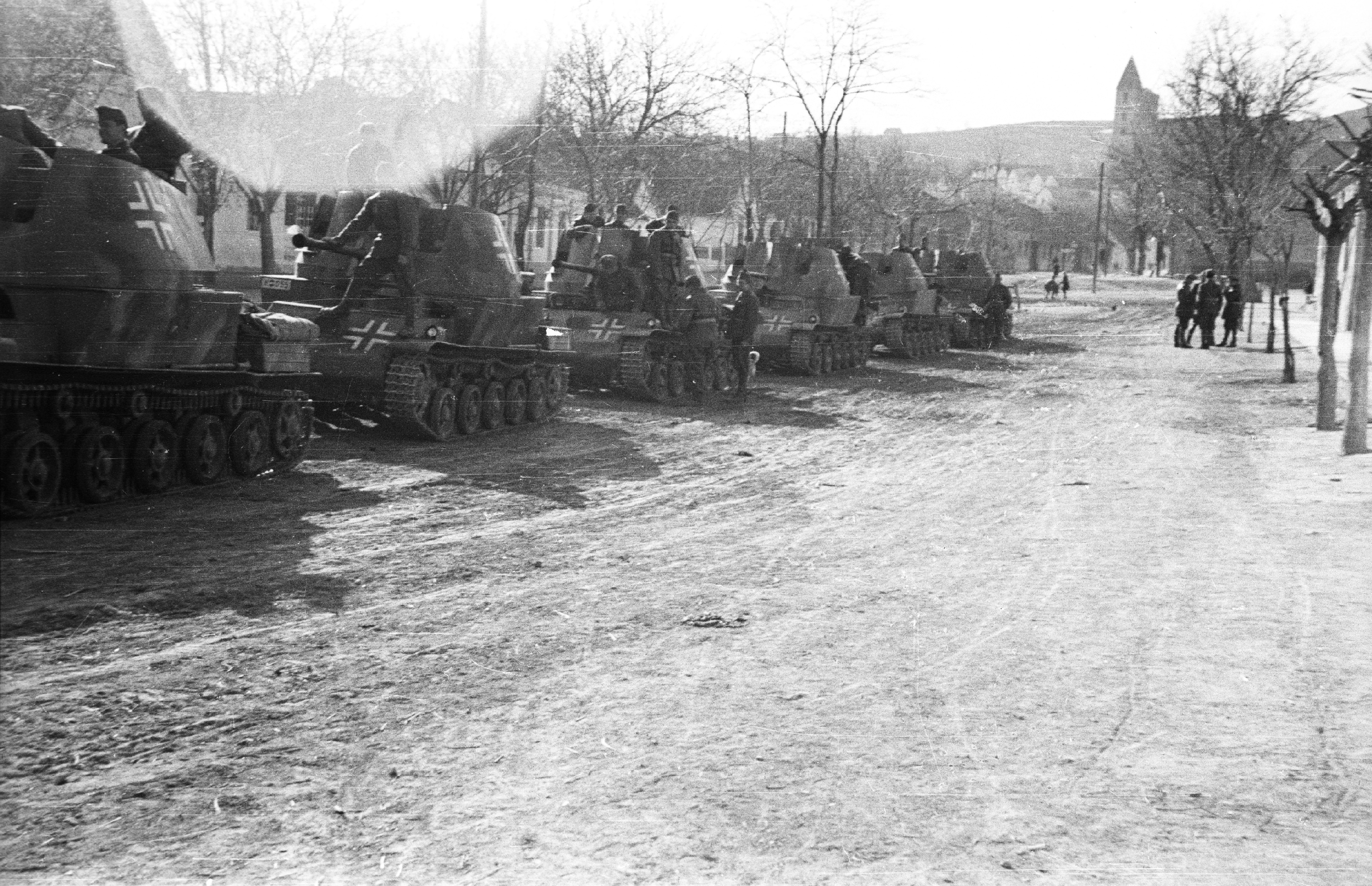
40M Nimróds in marching column on the training grounds near Zsámbék, in spring 1942. In the background is the Premonstratensian Monastery.

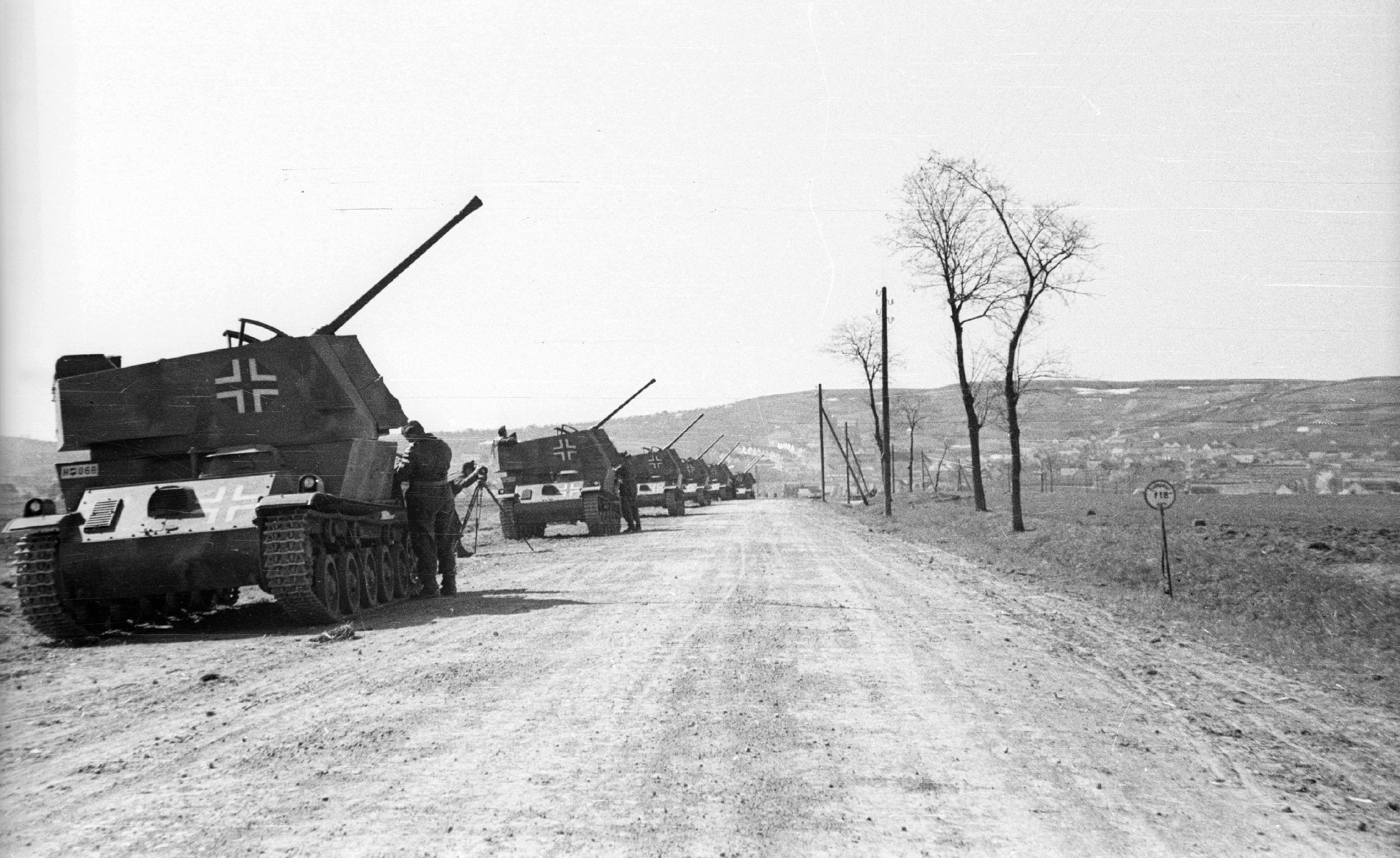
A Nimród anti-aircraft gun battery in firing position along the Zsámbék-Páty road.

== Comparable vehicles ==
- Crusader Mk. III Anti-Aircraft Tank Mk. I – (United Kingdom)
- L-62 Anti II – (Finland)
- M19 Multiple Gun Motor Carriage – (United States)
- Möbelwagen – (Nazi Germany)
- Ostwind – (Nazi Germany)
- Wirbelwind – (Nazi Germany)
- ZSU-37 – (Soviet Union)
