= German tanks in World War II =

Armored fighting vehicles used by Nazi Germany

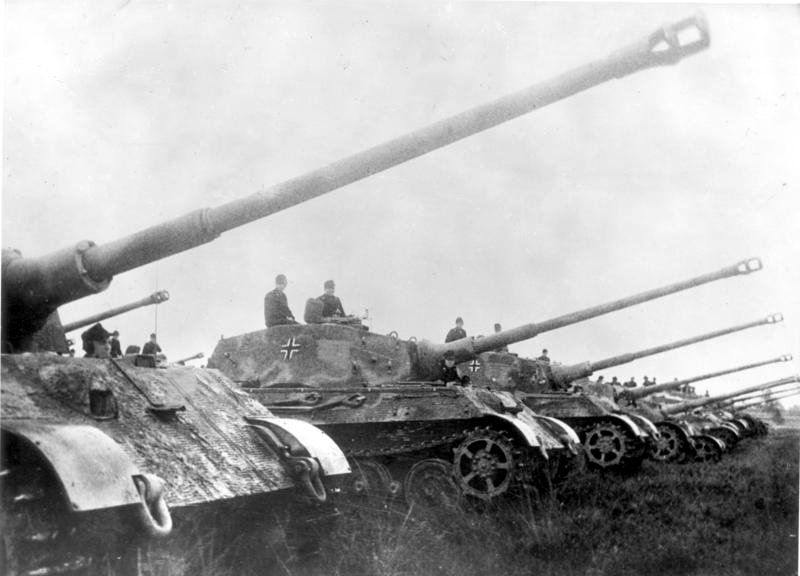
German Tiger II tanks.

Nazi Germany developed numerous tank designs used in World War II. In addition to domestic designs, Germany also used various captured and foreign-built tanks.

German tanks were an important part of the Wehrmacht and played a fundamental role during the whole war, and especially in the blitzkrieg battle strategy. In the subsequent more troubled and prolonged campaigns, German tanks proved to be adaptable and efficient adversaries to the Allies. When the Allied forces technically managed to surpass the earlier German tanks in battle, they still had to face the experience and skills of the German tank crews and most powerful and technologically advanced later tanks, such as the Panther, the Tiger I and Tiger II, which had the reputation of being fearsome opponents.

== The Panzer name ==
Panzer (/ˈpænzər/; German pronunciation: [ˈpantsɐ]) is a German word that means "armour". It derives through the French word pancier, "breastplate", from Latin pantex, "belly".

The word is used in English and some other languages as a loanword in the context of the German military. In particular, it is used in the proper names of military formations (Panzerdivision, 4th Panzer Army, etc.), and in the proper names of tanks, such as Panzer IV, etc.

The dated German term is Panzerkampfwagen, "tank" or "armoured combat vehicle". The modern commonly used synonym is Kampfpanzer, or "fight panzer". The first German tank, the A7V of 1918, was referred to as a Sturmpanzerwagen (roughly, "armoured assault vehicle").

== History ==
=== Development and performance ===
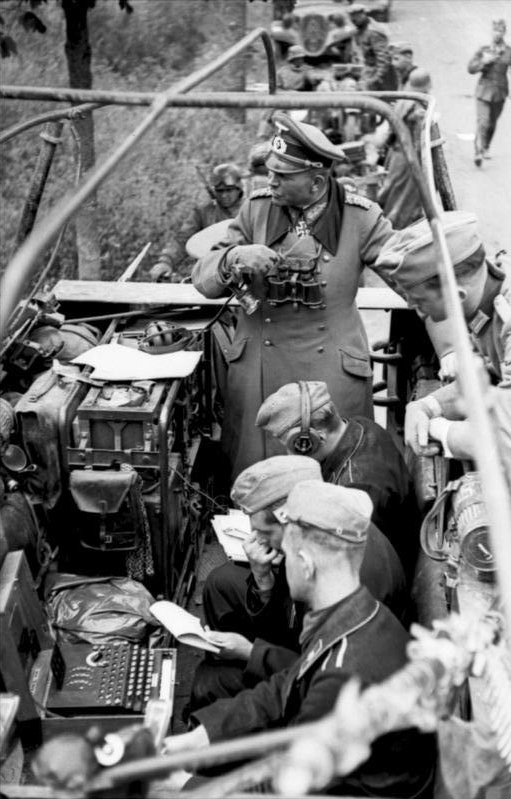
Heinz Guderian during the Battle of France in a radio vehicle. An Enigma machine for encrypting messages sits on the desk.

The German tank forces were a success especially due to tactical innovation. Using so-called Blitzkrieg ("lightning war") tactics, Heinz Guderian, Ewald von Kleist and other field commanders such as Erwin Rommel broke the hiatus of the Phoney War in a manner almost outside the comprehension of the Allied – and, indeed, the German – High Command. Basically, as a coherent unit, the combined arms tactic of the blitzkrieg shocked the Allies.

Despite this, the German Panzer forces at the start of World War II appeared not especially impressive. Only 4% of the defense budget was spent on armored fighting vehicle (AFV) production. Guderian had planned for two main tanks: the Panzer III equipped with a gun for engaging other tanks and the Panzer IV with a short barreled howitzer to be used in support of the infantry, with production starting in 1936 and 1937 respectively. The design work for the Panzer IV had begun in 1935 and trials of prototypes were undertaken in 1937, but by the time of the invasion of Poland only a few hundred 'troop trial' models were available. Development work was then halted and limited production was begun by Krupp in Magdeburg (Grusonwerk AG), Essen and Bochum in October 1939 with 20 vehicles built. However, even that low number could not be sustained, with production dropping to ten in April 1940. Such low production numbers were due to tanks being given a low priority for steel relative to the more conventional needs of an army, such as artillery shells.

==== Grosstraktor ====
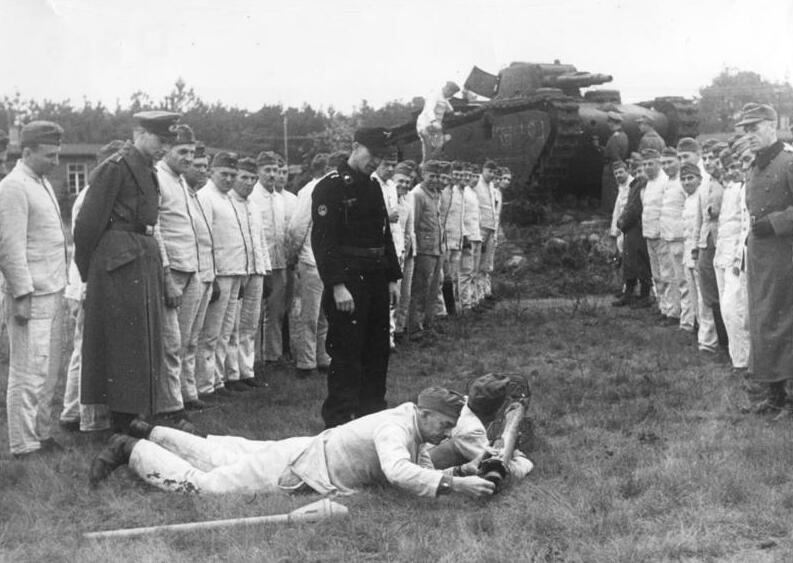
A Grosstraktor used for anti-tank training (1944)

Number built – 6 Germany was forbidden to produce and use tanks because of the Treaty of Versailles. But a secret program under the code name "Traktor" was developing armored military vehicles and artillery. Grosstraktors were used only for training.

==== Leichttraktor ====
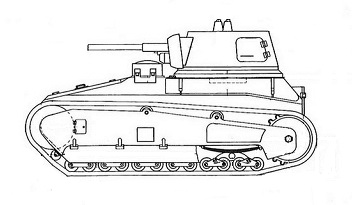
Leichttraktor

Number built – 4 Two years after the "Grosstraktor" project, prototypes of "Leichter Traktor" ("Light Tractor") were built. In the early years of World War II they were used as training tanks. The Germans tested the tank in the Soviet Union under the Treaty of Rapallo.

==== Neubaufahrzeug ====
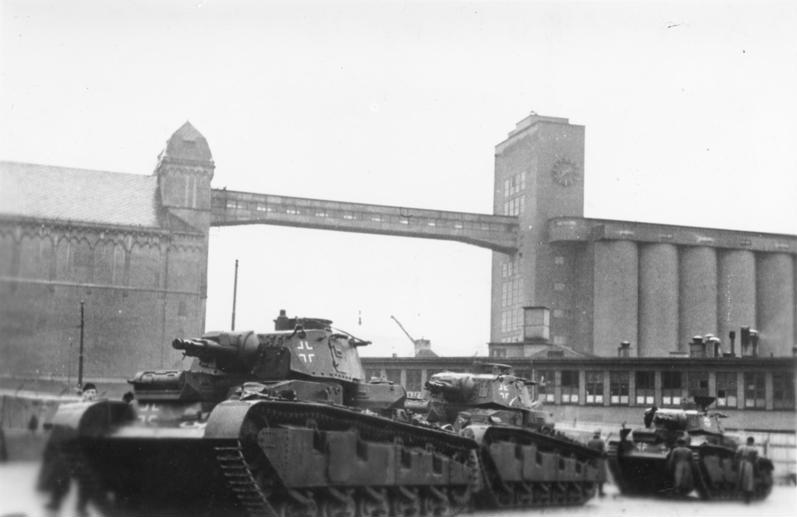
Three Neubaufahrzeug tanks in Norway 1940

Number built – 5 The German Neubaufahrzeug series of tank prototypes were a first attempt to create a medium tank for the Wehrmacht after Adolf Hitler came to power. Multi-turreted, heavy and slow, they were not considered successful enough to continue limited production. Therefore, only five were ever made, and only three of armored steel. These were primarily used for propaganda purposes, though three took part in the Battle of Norway in 1940.

==== Panzer III ====
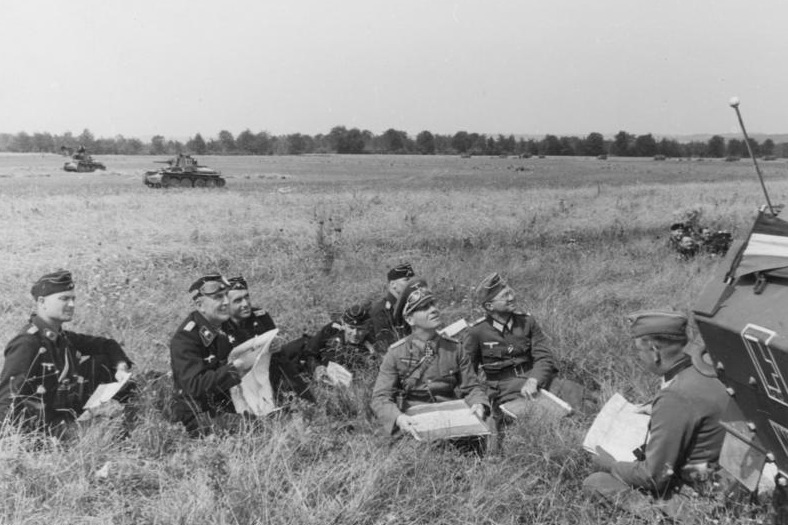
Rommel with officers during the Western Europe campaign (June 1940)

Nevertheless, the number of available Panzer IVs (211) was still larger than that of the Panzer III (98). There were also technical problems with the Panzer III: it was widely considered to be under-gunned with the 3.7 cm KwK 36 gun and production was split among four manufacturers (MAN, Daimler-Benz, Rheinmetall-Borsig, and Krupp) with little regard for each firm's expertise, and the rate of production was initially very low (40 in September 1939, 58 in June 1940), taking until December 1940 to reach 100 vehicles a month. The panzer force for the early German victories was a mix of the Panzer I (machine gun only), Panzer II (20 mm autocannon) light tanks and two models of Czech tanks (the Panzer 38(t) and the Panzer 35(t)). By May 1940 there were 349 Panzer III tanks available for the attacks on France and the Low Countries.

Though the Anglo-French forces appeared numerically and technically superior, with a greater quantity of medium and heavy vehicles, German crews were trained and experienced in the new combined tactics of tanks, anti-tank guns and dive bombers. In particular the Wehrmacht exploited the advantages of the Panzer III, with its modern radio communications system and a crew of three men in the turret, resulting in greater efficiency in the field and winning the Battle of France.

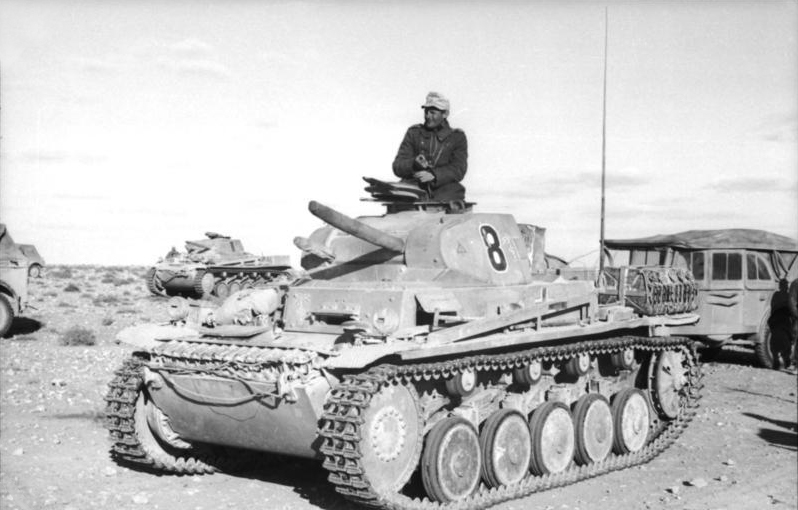
The Panzer II was armed with a 20 mm (0.79 in) autocannon and a machine gun in rotating turret

The objections to the limited gun armament of the Panzer III were recognized during its conception, and its design was altered to include a large turret ring to make it possible to fit a 2250 ft/s (656 m/s) muzzle velocity 5 cm KwK L/42 gun on later models. In July 1940, too late to see action in the final weeks of the Battle of France, the first 17 of these models were produced. Designated the Panzer III Ausf. F, the other changes included an upgraded Maybach engine and numerous minor changes to ease mass production.

The Ausf. F was quickly supplanted by the Ausf. G with an up-armored gun mantlet, which was the main tank of the Afrika Korps in 1940–41 and also saw action in Yugoslavia and Greece. Around 2,150 Panzer IIIs were produced, of which around 450 were the Ausf G. These tanks were still under-gunned, poorly armored and mechanically overly-complex in comparison to equivalent British tanks. After fighting in Libya in late 1940 the Ausf. H was put into production with simpler mechanics, wider tracks, and improved armor. In April 1941 there was a general 'recall' of the Panzer III to upgrade the main gun to the new 50 mm KwK L/60, with the new Panzergranate 40 projectile, and muzzle velocity was pushed to 3875 ft/s (1,181 m/s). New tanks produced with this gun were designated Ausf. J.

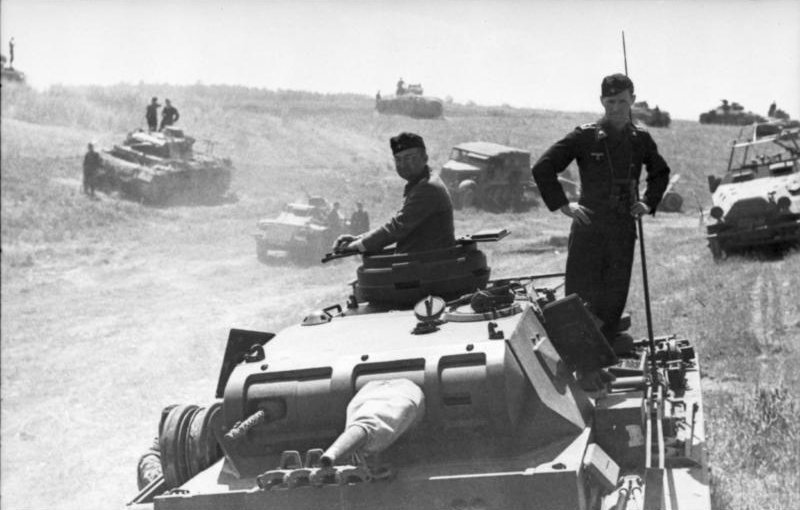
A German Panzer III tank, of the 13th Panzer Division, during the first days of Operation Barbarossa

The invasion of the Soviet Union in Operation Barbarossa signaled a very important change in German tank development. In June 1941 Panzer III tanks first encountered the Soviet T-34 medium tank. Initially the Germans had 1,449 Panzer III tanks ready for combat, about 950 of which were versions equipped with the 50 mm L/42 gun, which constituted the Wehrmacht's main tank force. In July 1941 36 Panzer and motorized infantry divisions were assigned to the invasion, fielding over 3000 AFVs.

While German tanks were inferior in armor, armament, and numbers, the Soviet armored forces were almost annihilated during the first months of the campaign by the German Panzer divisions, which proved to be much more experienced and efficient: over 17,000 Soviet tanks were destroyed or abandoned. The Soviets complained of serious mechanical deficiencies and design flaws in their T-34 tanks. Also, the crews were inexperienced and the logistical support was insufficient. On the battlefield, the Panzer III's 50 mm gun was able to seriously damage T-34 tanks and at the typical combat distances – 500 metres (1,600 ft) to 1,000 metres (3,300 ft) – the German tank was not really inferior. It was more difficult for Panzer III tanks to counter KV-1 heavy tanks with their armor being nearly impenetrable at the front.

During the North African campaign Panzer III tanks, especially older models, had troubles in direct fights against British Matilda II infantry tanks, due to the superiority of their armor and powerful 40mm QF 2-pounder gun. Despite this, the Panzer III tanks managed to obtain important victories, such as in the Battle of Gazala, where the tank, skilfully employed by experienced German crews and supported by anti-tank formations, achieved the most brilliant results of its deployment in Africa, despite some difficulties against the Allied heavy tanks. The British armored forces, on the other hand, were almost destroyed.

The Panzer III's armor was upgraded to 70 mm by additional plates, and spaced armor was introduced to protect against shaped charge (high-explosive anti-tank) attacks. However the first Panzer IV tanks with 75 mm L/48 cannon marked the end of the Panzer III's role as the German main tank. Eventually, Panzer III production was ended in August 1943 with the Ausf. M (a conversion of older types), the vehicle having been fitted with a short barrelled 75 mm KwK 51 gun (effectively the same gun the Panzer IV had started with) and downgraded to a support role. The Panzer III chassis continued in production until the end of the war as the base for a range of vehicles chiefly the Sturmgeschütz III assault gun.

==== Panzer IV ====
Although slow, production of the Panzer IV had continued; by the end of 1940 386 Ausf. D models were in service and in 1941 a further 480 were produced, despite an order from the army for 2,200. The short 75 mm (2.95 in) L/24 gun was the main advantage of the Panzer IV; the weight and armor of early models were close to that of the Panzer III.

With an upgrade of the Panzer IV's 75 mm L/24 short gun to a longer high-velocity 75 mm gun, suitable for anti-tank use, the tank proved to be highly effective. This new 43 caliber long gun could penetrate a T-34 at a variety of impact angles beyond 1,000 m (3,300 ft) and up to 1,600 m (5,200 ft) range. On the Eastern Front the shipment of the first model to mount the new gun, the Ausf. F2, began in spring 1942, and by the Case Blue offensive there were around 135 Panzer IV's with the L/43 tank gun available. They played a crucial role in the events that unfolded between June 1942 and March 1943, and the Panzer IV became the mainstay of the German Panzer divisions.

On the Western Front the American M4 Sherman's 75 mm M3 gun had troubles facing the Panzer IV late model. Panzer IV late models' 80 mm (3.15 in) frontal hull armor could easily withstand hits from the 75 mm weapon on the Sherman at normal combat ranges. The British up-gunned the Sherman with their highly effective 76mm QF 17-pounder gun resulting in the Sherman Firefly, which was the only Allied tank capable of dealing with all German tanks, at normal combat ranges, in time for the Normandy landings. It was not until July 1944 that American Shermans fitted with the 76 mm gun M1 gun achieved parity in firepower with the Panzer IV.

Later Panzer IV variants further improved the gun to the 75 mm L/48 but were mainly characterized by increasing the main armor and adding spaced and skirt armor to protect against anti-tank weapons. Zimmerit paste to prevent magnetic charges being attached was also introduced on the Panzer IV from December 1943 to October 1944.

About 8,500 Panzer IV tanks were produced overall.

==== Panzer V (Panther) ====
Despite continued efforts with the lighter tanks throughout the war, German designers also produced a direct counter to the heavier Allied tanks with the PzKpfw V Panther. Design work on the replacement for the Panzer IV had begun in 1937 and prototypes were being tested in 1941. The emergence of the Soviet T-34 led to an acceleration of this leisurely time-table. At the insistence of Guderian a team was dispatched to the eastern front in November 1941 to assess the T-34 and report. Two features of the Soviet tank were considered the most significant: the top was the sloped armor all round which gave much-improved shot deflection and also increased the armor effective relative thickness against penetration; the second was the long over-hanging gun, a feature German designers had avoided up to then. Daimler-Benz and MAN were tasked with designing and building a new 30–35 tonne tank by spring 1942.

The two T-34 influenced proposals were delivered in April 1942. The Daimler-Benz design was an 'homage' to the T-34, ditching the propensity for engineering excellence, and hence complexity, to produce a clean, simple design with plenty of potential. The MAN design was more conventional to German thinking and was the one accepted by the Waffenprüfamt 6 committee. A prototype was demanded by May and design detail work was assigned to Kniekamp.

If the overhanging gun and sloping armor are ignored the Panther was a conventional German design: its internal layout for the five crew was standard and the mechanicals were complex. Weighing 43 tonnes it was powered by a 700 PS (522 kW) gasoline engine driving eight double-leaved bogie wheels on each side; control was through a seven-speed gearbox and hydraulic disc brakes. The armor was homogenous steel plate, welded but also interlocked for strength. Preproduction models had only 60 mm frontal hull armor, but this was soon increased to 80 mm on the production Ausf. D and later models. The main gun was a 75 mm L/70 with 79 rounds, supported by two MG 34 machine guns.

The MAN design was officially accepted in September 1942 and put into immediate production with top priority; finished tanks were being produced just two months later and suffered from reliability problems as a result of this haste. With a production target of 600 vehicles a month the work had to be expanded out of MAN to include Daimler-Benz, and in 1943 the firms of Maschinenfabrik Niedersachsen-Hannover and Henschel. Due to disruption monthly production never approached the target, peaking in July 1944 with 380 tanks delivered and ending around April 1945 with at least 5,964 built. In addition to these mainstream efforts the German army also experimented with a variety of unusual prototypes and also put into production several peculiarities. Some Tiger tanks were fitted with anti-personnel grenade launchers that were loaded and fired from within the tank as an anti-ambush device.

The Panther first saw action in the Battle of Kursk beginning on July 5, 1943, where it served alongside the Panzer IV and the heavier Tiger I. The Panther proved to be effective in open country and long range engagements and is considered one of the best tanks of World War II for its excellent firepower and protection, although its initial tech reliability was less impressive.

== List of tanks ==
=== Panzer I ===
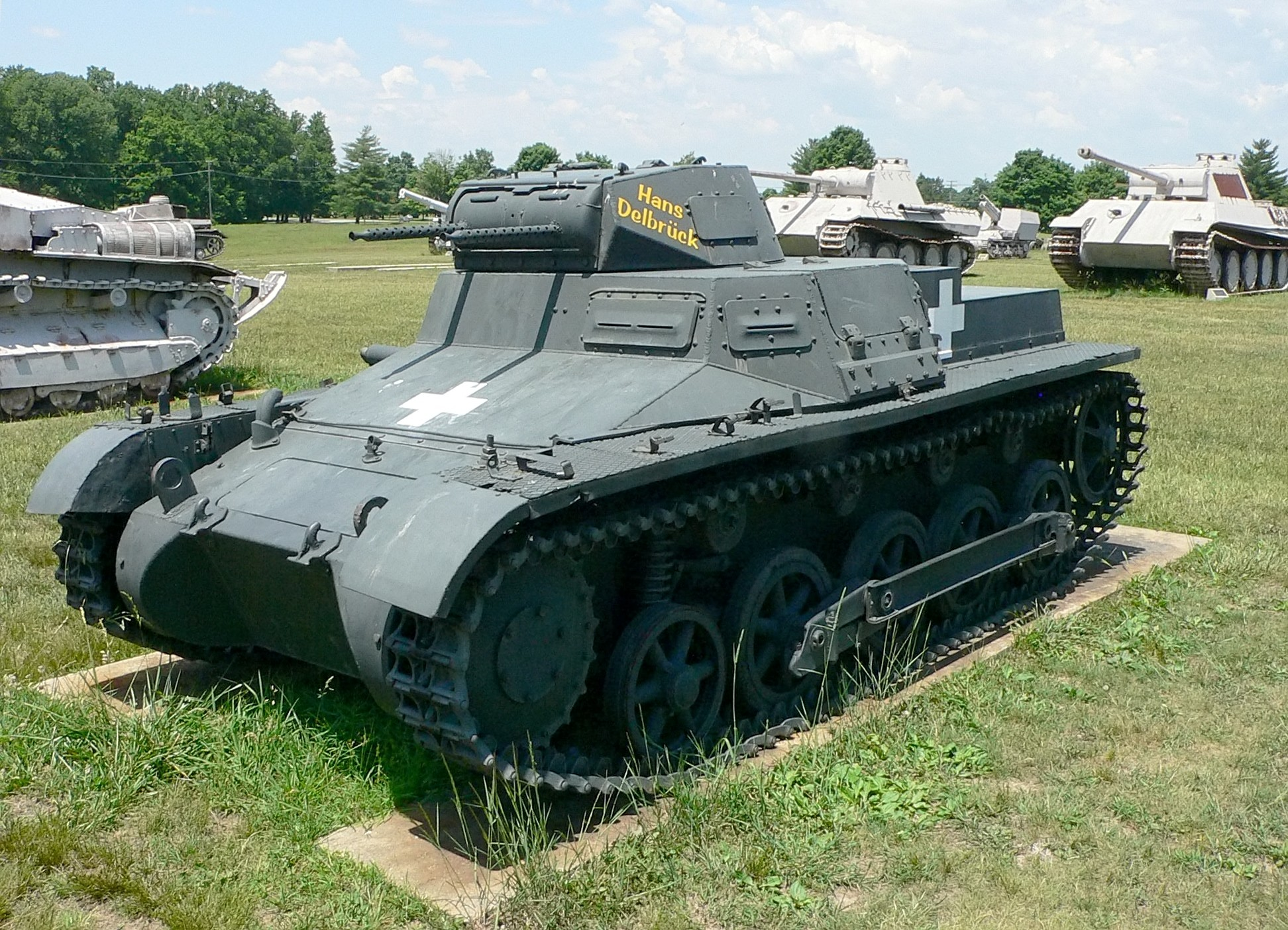
Panzerkampfwagen I

Number built – 1,493 The first of these German-built tanks was the Panzer I. It was not designed for combat, but rather as a training vehicle to familiarize tank crews with Germany's modern battle concepts, and to prepare the nation's industry for the upcoming war effort. Nevertheless, the tank design did see actual combat, first during the Spanish Civil War of 1936, then again during World War II, and elsewhere.

Since the tank was never intended to be used in actual combat, it was plagued by weapon and armour shortcomings through its entire life. Attempts were made to improve the design, but with little success. The Panzer I's participation in the Spanish Civil War did, however, provide vital information to the German military about modern tank warfare.

=== Panzer II ===
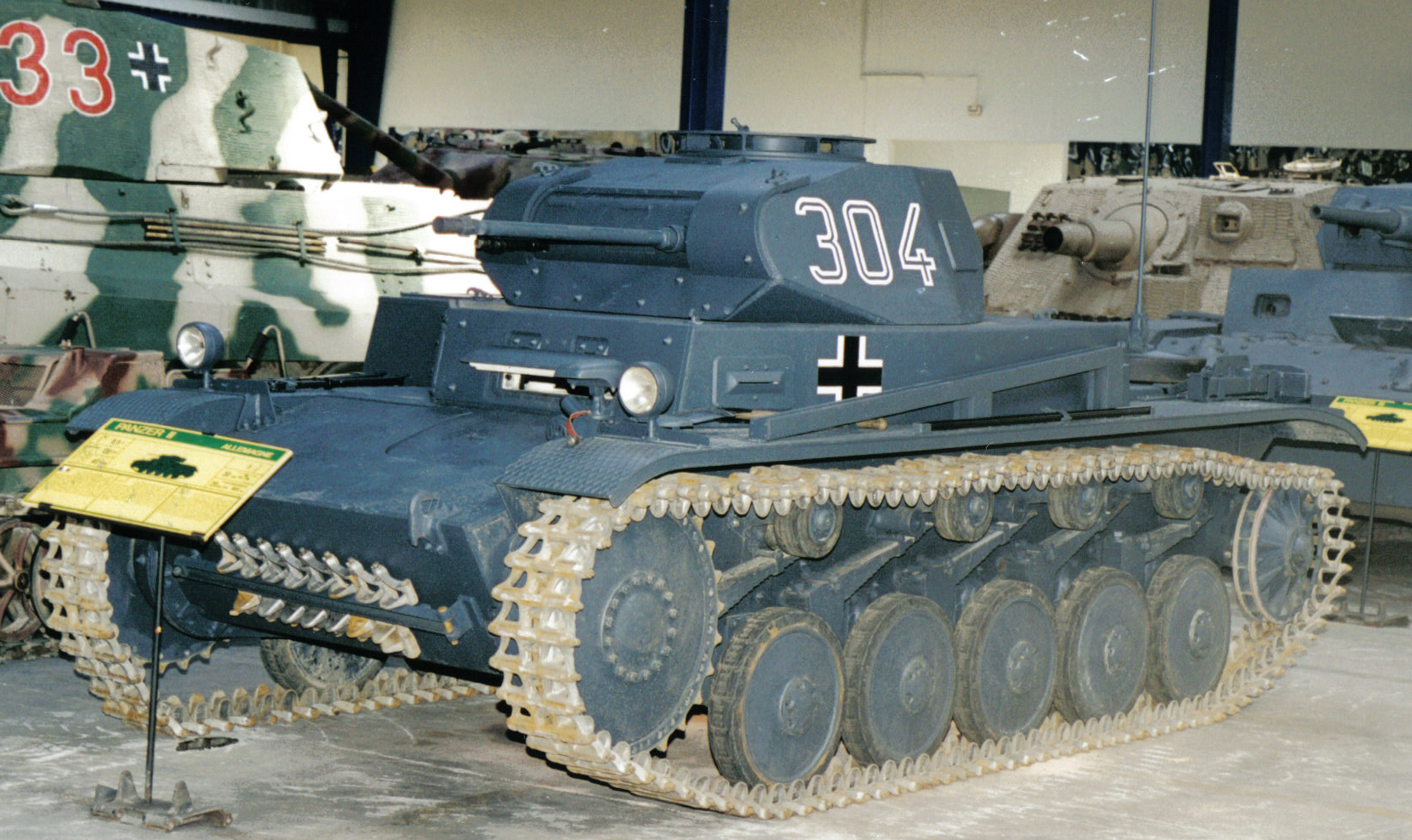
Panzerkampfwagen II

Number built – 1,850 The Panzer II was ordered into production because the construction of medium tanks, the Panzer III and IV, was falling behind schedule. The Panzer II was intended to “fill the gap” until the Panzer III and IV could come into full production. Along with the Panzer I, the II made up the bulk of German tank forces during the invasion of Poland and France.

=== Panzer III ===
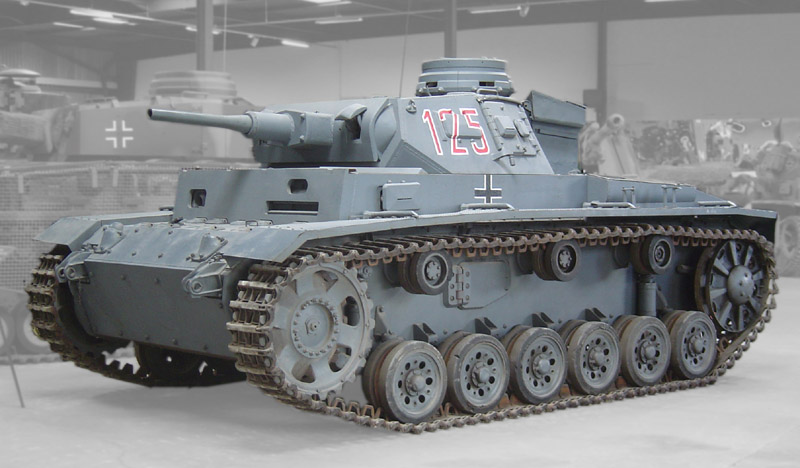
Panzer III Ausf. H

Number built – 5,764 The Panzer III was intended to be the main medium core of the German armored force when it was designed during the inter-war period. While it was originally designed to fight other tanks, its 37 mm and later 50 mm guns could not keep pace with Soviet T-34 and KV tanks, which, respectively, either had sloped armor or relatively thick armor, and both shared 76 mm guns. By 1941, the Panzer III was the most numerous of German tank designs. However, during the later parts of 1943, it was largely replaced by later versions of the Panzer IV and Panzer V "Panther". Its assault gun chassis variant, the Sturmgeschütz III, was, with just over 9,400 units built, the most widely produced German armored fighting vehicle of World War II.

=== Panzer IV ===
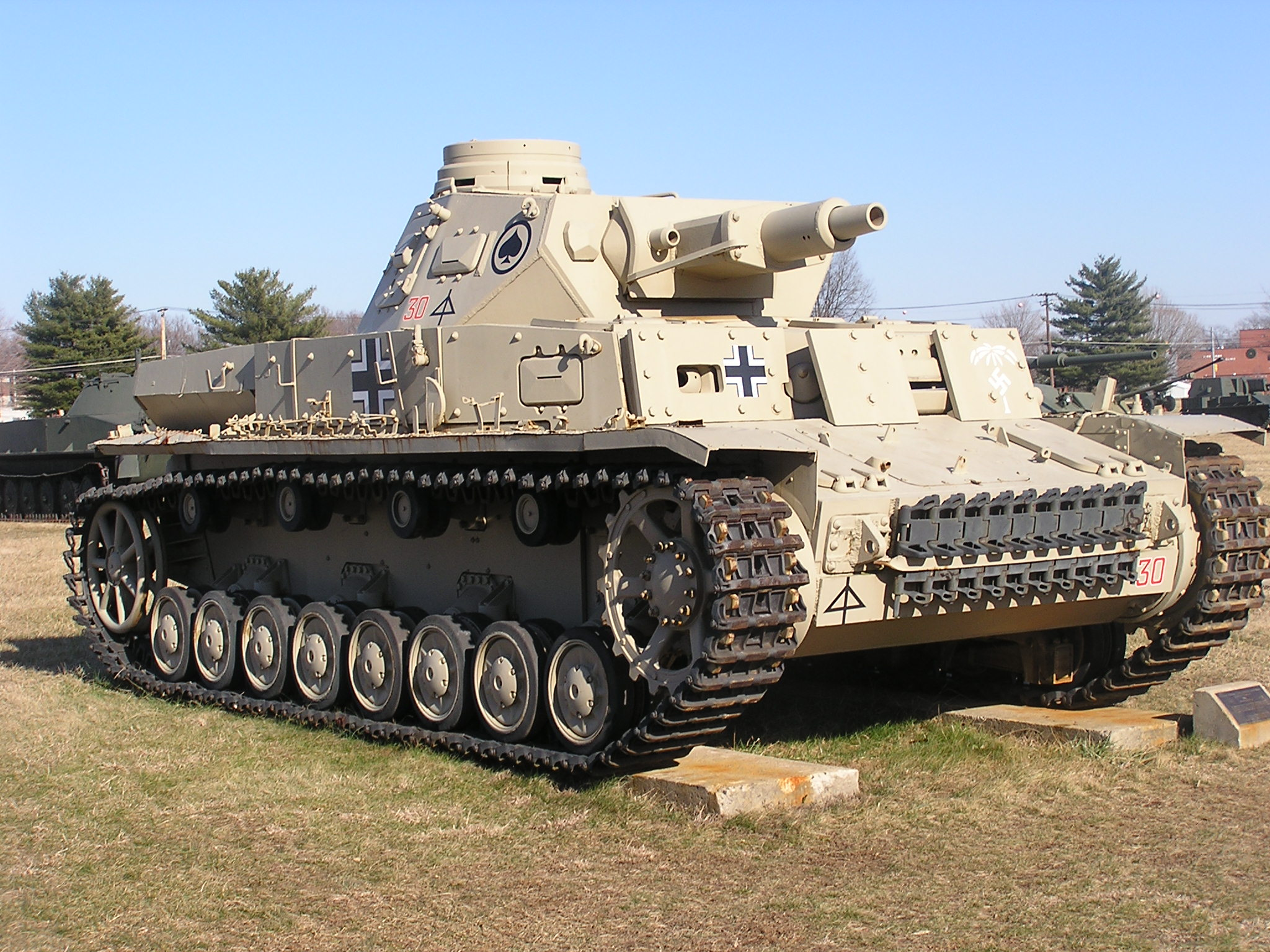
Panzerkampfwagen IV

Number built – 8,800 The Panzer IV was the workhorse of the German tank force during World War II. It saw combat in all land theaters, with the exception of the Pacific Theater, and was the only tank to remain in production for the entire war.

The Panzer IV was originally intended to be an infantry-support tank. It was thus armed with a 75 mm howitzer intended primarily to fire high-explosive shells in support of other tanks or infantry. By mid 1942, it was rearmed with a longer 75 mm dual-purpose gun that could defeat most Soviet tanks. In the latter half of the war, about half of all German tanks were Panzer IVs or derivatives.

=== Panther ===
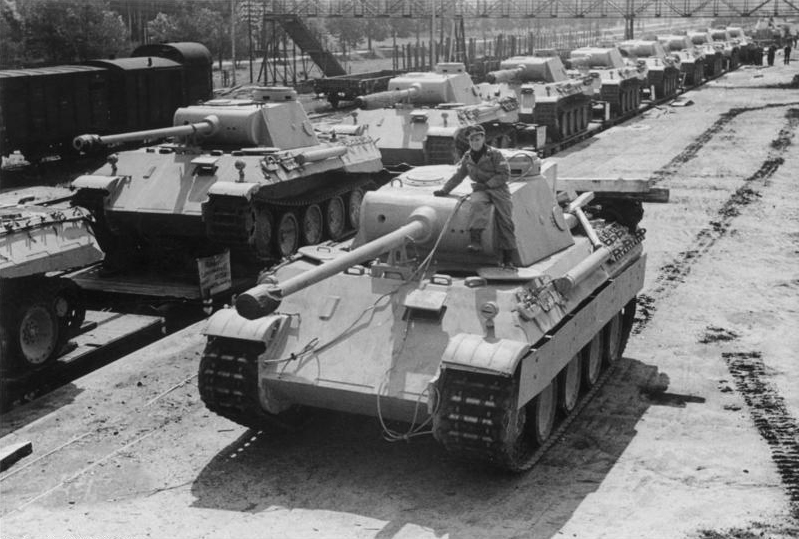
A Panther Ausf. D, 1943

Number built – 6,000 The Panther was a medium tank (45 tonnes) with a crew of five, which was designed to counter the Soviet T-34 tank. In weight it was comparable to Soviet heavy tanks. This tank was introduced in the Battle of Kursk, one of the largest tank battles in history. It had sloped armor which increased the effective relative thickness of the armor from 80 mm (3.1 in) to roughly 140 mm (5.5 in), effectively making the front of the tank virtually impervious to enemy fire. However the sides of this tank were very vulnerable, ranging from only 40 mm (1.6 in) to 50 mm (2.0 in) of either barely sloped or completely flat armor plating. The tank carried a high-velocity 75 mm gun, which possessed more penetration than the Tiger's 88 mm gun at short range. Series production began in 1943.

The tank is considered by some to have been the best tank in the war, and to have greatly influenced post-war tank designs, setting a role model for the balance of firepower, mobility, and armor protection.

=== Tiger I ===
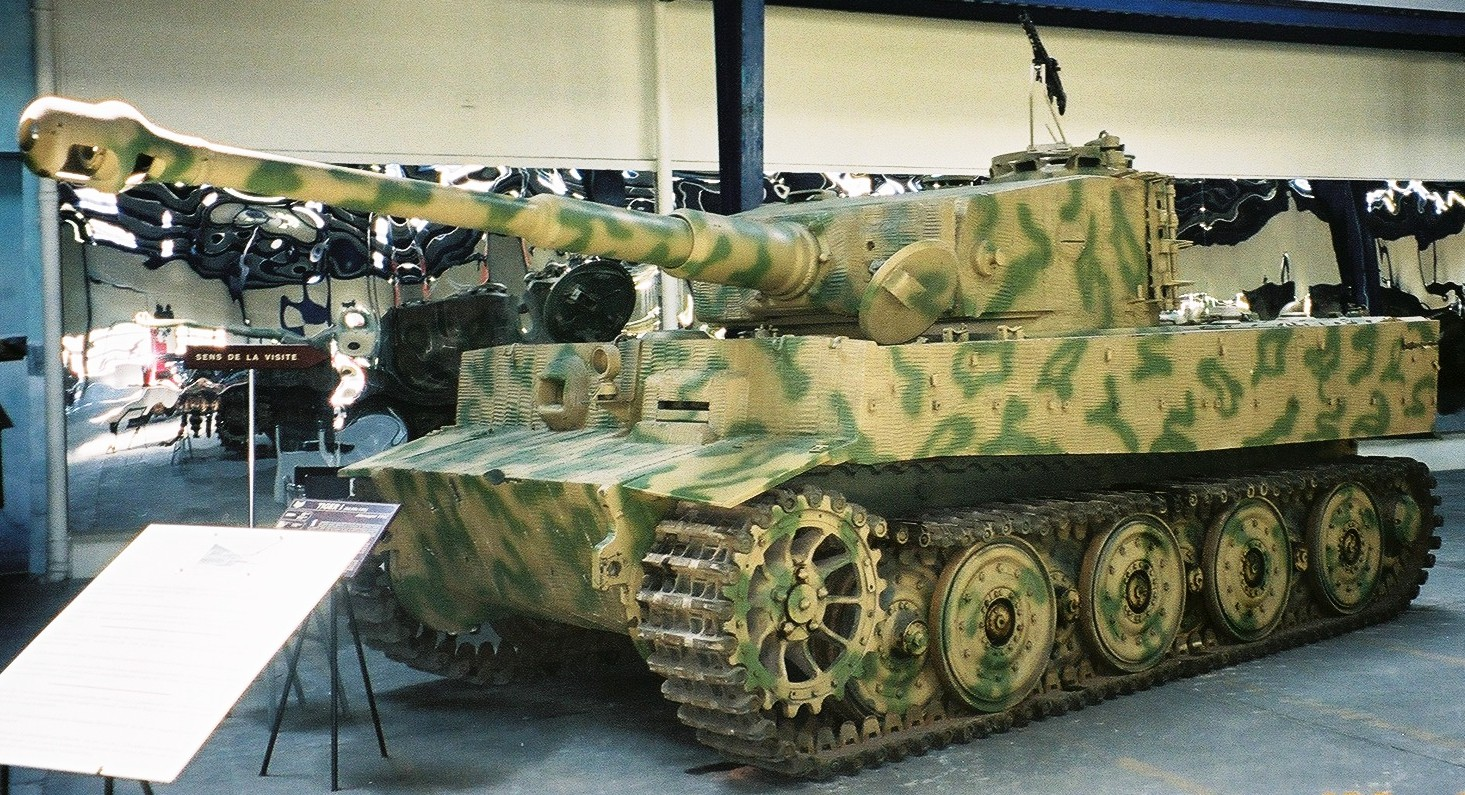
Panzerkampfwagen VI Tiger

Number built – 1,347 In response to the T-34 after the invasion of the Soviet Union, the German forces ordered the construction of a new heavy tank. Designated as the Panzerkampfwagen VI, it was christened "Tiger" by Ferdinand Porsche. The tank had formidable firepower (the 88 mm anti-tank gun) and thick armor. It had some mechanical problems due to its weight. The Tiger had 100 mm of armor on the front of the hull and turret, while the sides had 80mm of armor. Armor was weakest on the rear of the turret. Americans and British tank forces first encountered the German Tiger I in North Africa, where it outclassed the British Churchills and American M4 Shermans.

=== Tiger II ===
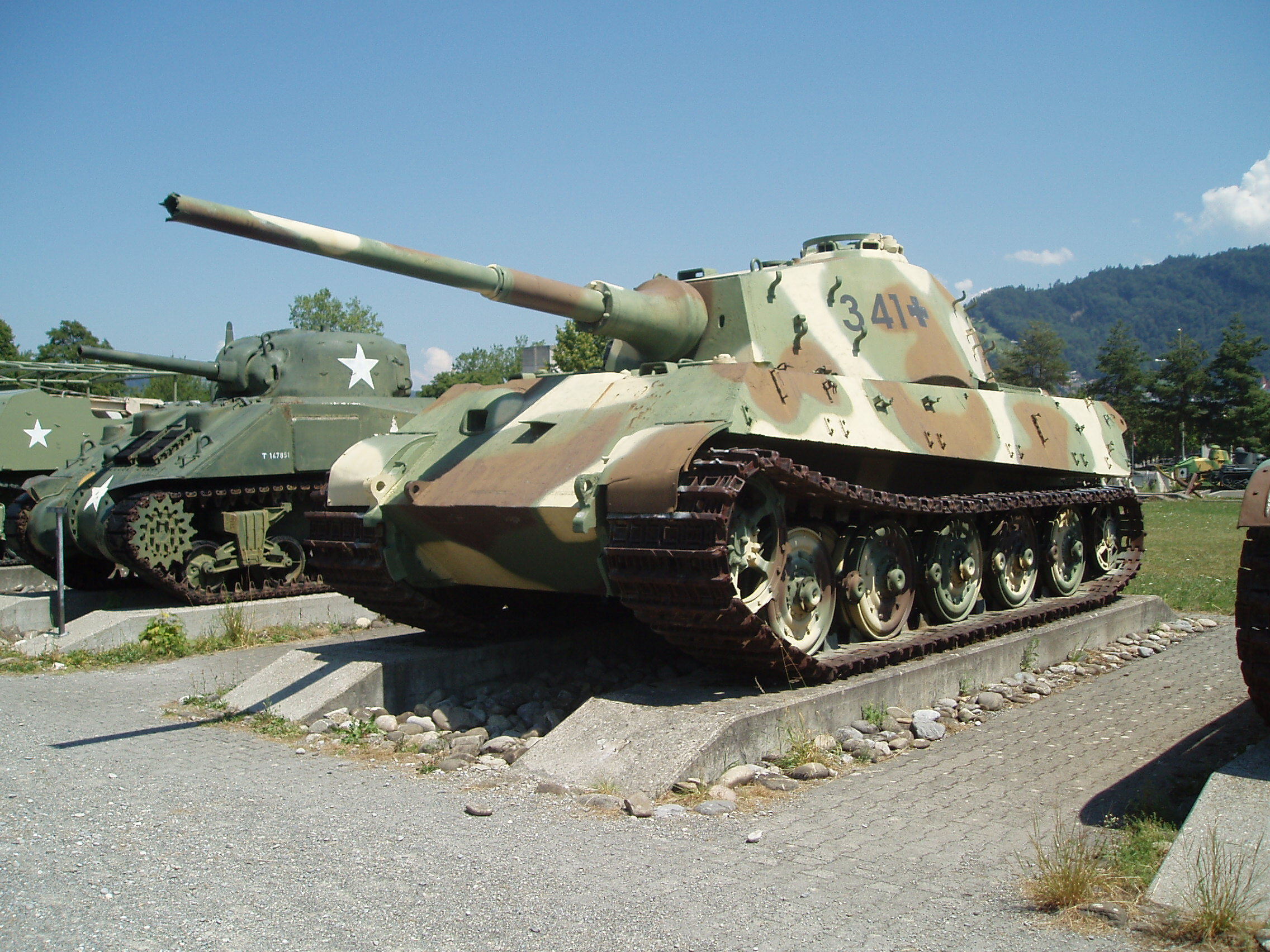
Panzerkampfwagen VI Tiger II

Number built – 492 Even larger and heavier than the Tiger I, the Pzkpfw VIB Tiger II. It is also known under the informal name Königstiger (the German name for the "Bengal tiger"), often semi-literally translated as the 'King Tiger' or 'Royal Tiger' by Allied soldiers. It was the largest tank mass-produced by German forces during the war, and remains among the heaviest mass-produced tanks ever. Its 8.8 cm KwK 43 could knock out virtually every Allied tank, while its sloped armor was thick enough to defeat most Allied guns (excluding hollow charge weapons). However, the Tiger II suffered from multiple mechanical problems due to its rushed development and excessive weight. It was named after the Tiger but it was a combination of innovations learned from the Panther and Tiger I.

== Experimental or prototype vehicles ==
=== Panther II ===
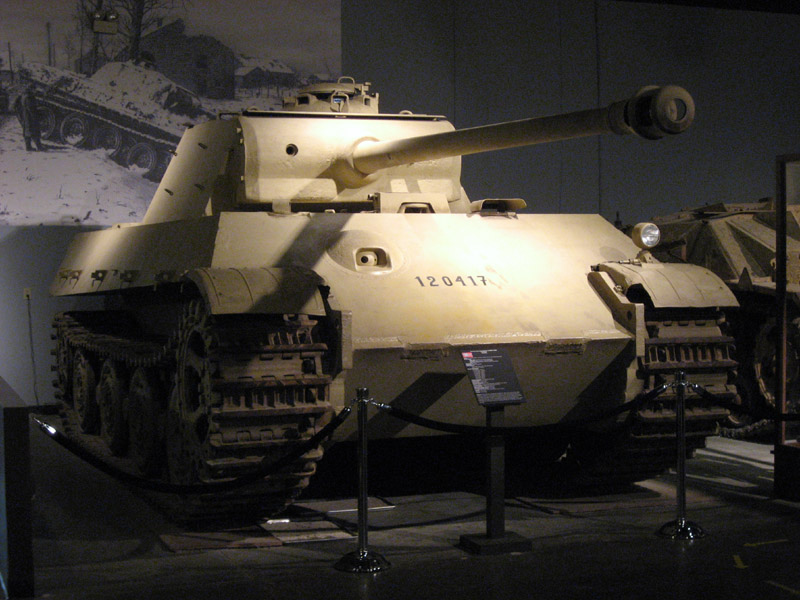
Panther II on display at Patton Museum of Cavalry and Armor, Fort Knox. The Panther G turret on display was not originally fitted to this hull and was installed later as a placeholder.

Number built – 1 chassis. The Panther II was built as a successor to the Panther tank, featuring improvements from lessons learnt from the Eastern front campaign. While visually similar, it was essentially a different tank, with thicker armor, a new turret, engine and gun. Many of the components from the original Panther were dropped and replaced by components from the Tiger and Tiger II. It would have been faster, though weighed more. One prototype was made but it was halted to focus on the Panther I. Some of the design influence went into the E-50.

=== Tiger (P) ===
Number built – 5 The VK45.01 (P), also known as the Tiger (P), was an unsuccessful heavy tank prototype produced by Porsche in Germany in 1942. It was not selected for production because it didn't work during testing in front of Hitler. So the Henschel-built VK45.01 (H) design to the same specification, using the same Krupp-designed turret as the Porsche prototype did, was produced as the Tiger I. Most of the 91 existing Porsche-produced chassis were instead rebuilt as self-propelled guns. The original main self-propelled gun made on the Tiger (P)'s chassis was the Ferdinand. This tank also had mechanical problems, partly from the complex, copper-dependent gasoline-electric drive system's poor grade of copper. It had a maximum of 200 mm of armor plating at the front.

=== Löwe ===
Even larger and heavier was the super-heavy tank Löwe. It translates to "Lion" in German. It remained on blueprints and was cancelled in favor of the heavier Maus.

=== Maus ===
Number built – 2, 1 was incomplete. The Maus was a super-heavy tank, heavier than the Löwe. It translates to "Mouse" in German. Only two prototypes were built, one of which was incomplete, and only one had the turret mounted, which was later destroyed. The other chassis was captured by the Soviets, who later mounted the turret from the other, completed Maus, which had its chassis destroyed at the end of the war by demolition charges.

=== E-100 ===
The Panzerkampfwagen E-100 (Gerät 383) (TG-01) was a German super-heavy tank design developed near the end of World War II. Only one chassis was produced with no turret made.

=== Panzer IX and Panzer X ===
The Panzer IX and X were 2 fictional super-heavy tank designs created for propaganda and counterintelligence purposes.

=== Ratte ===
The Ratte was the heaviest tank design of World War II German tanks. Ratte translates to "Rat". It was cancelled before any work was started on it.

== See also ==
- Tanks in the German Army
- German armoured fighting vehicles of World War II
- German armoured fighting vehicle production during World War II
- Jagdpanzer
- Sturmgeschütz III
- Neubaufahrzeug
- Entwicklung series
- Tanks in World War II
- Military technology during World War II
- Panzerschreck
- Panzerfaust
- Panzerschiff
- Panzerwaffe
- Panzerjäger
- Tank
- Tanks Break Through!
- Panzerjäger I

== Bibliography ==
- Beach, Jim (November 2007). "British Intelligence and German Tanks, 1916-1918." War in History 14:4: 454–475. History Reference Center. Web. 26 Oct. 2015. JSTOR 26069889.
- Buckley, John (2004). British Armour in the Normandy Campaign, 1944. London: F. Cass. ISBN 978-0-7146-5323-5.
- Cooling, B. F. "Review: British and American Tanks of World War II: The Complete Illustrated History of British, American and Commonwealth Tanks, Gun Motor Carriages and Special Purpose Vehicles, 1939–1945." Military Affairs 35.1 (1971): 34. V26 Oct. 2015.
- Hastings, Max (1999). Overlord: D-Day and the Battle for Normandy 1944. ISBN 978-0-330-39012-5.
- Jentz, Thomas; Doyle, Hilary (1993). Kingtiger Heavy Tank, 1942–45. London: Osprey. ISBN 978-1-85532-282-0.
- Jentz, Thomas; Doyle, Hilary (2001). Germany's Panzers in World War II: From Pz.Kpfw.I to Tiger II. ISBN 978-0-7643-1425-4.
- Perrett, Bryan (1999). Panzerkampfwagen III. Medium Tank 1936-44. ISBN 0-85045-362-3.
- Petre, Kellee Lyn. "Tanks: Ambitious Design For Victory." History Magazine 10.4 (2009): 13–16. History Reference Center. Web. 26 Oct. 2015.
- Stark, Warner. "Review: German Tanks of World War II: The Complete Illustrated History of German Armoured Fighting Vehicles 1926–1945."Military Affairs 34.4 (1970): 146. 26 Oct. 2015.
