= Ostwind =

Flakpanzer IV/3.7cm FlaK "Ostwind"
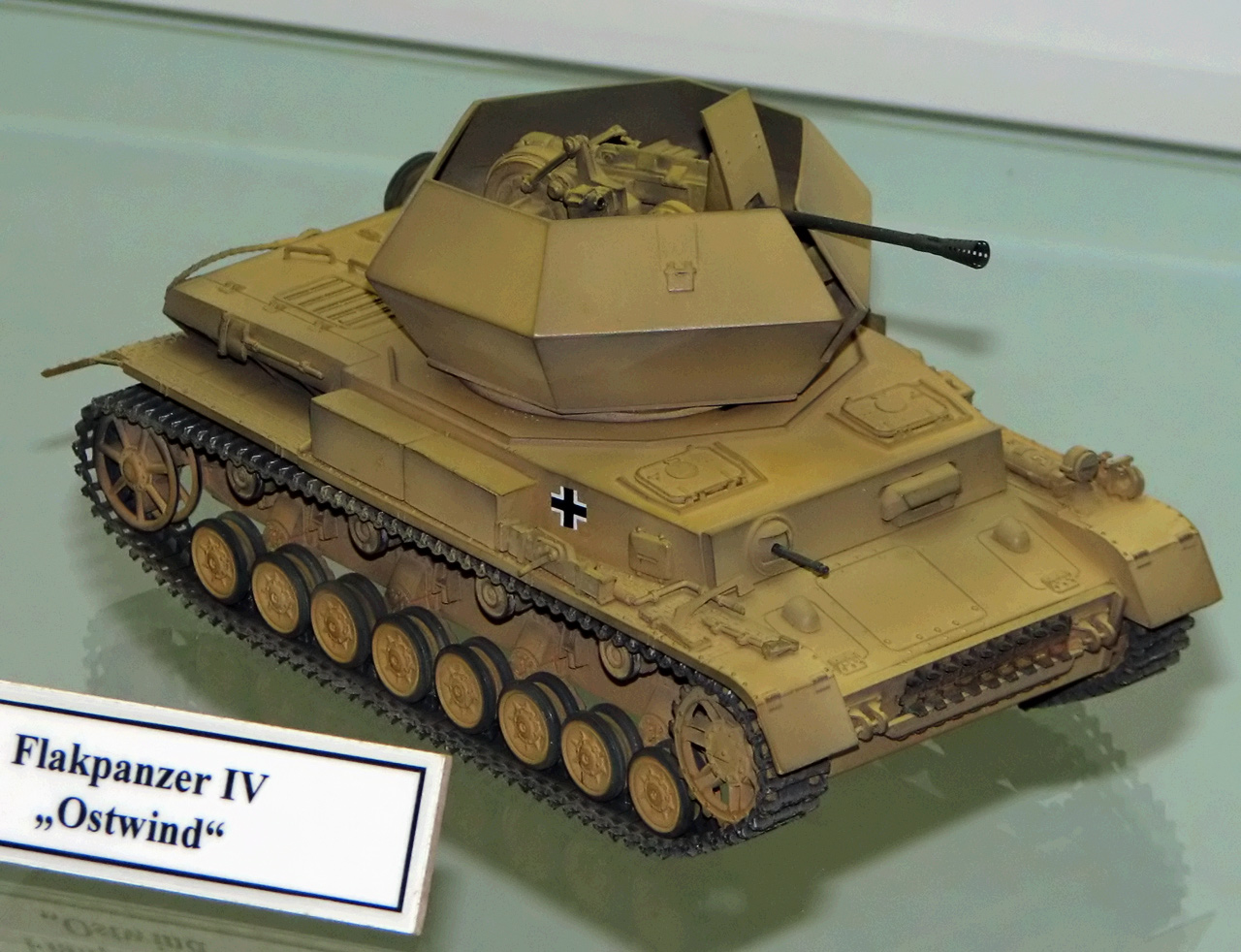
- Scale model of an Ostwind
- Type: Self-propelled anti-aircraft gun
- Place of origin: Nazi Germany

Production history
- Produced: 1944-1945
- No. built: 44 (22 converted from Panzer IV + 22 new production vehicles)

Specifications
- Mass: 25 tonnes
- Length: 5.92 m (19 ft 5 in)
- Width: 2.95 m (9 ft 8 in)
- Height: 3 m (9 ft 10 in)
- Crew: 5 (Commander, Gunner, Loader, Driver, Radio Operator)
- Armor: 10–80 mm (0.39–3.15 in)
- Main armament: 1x 3.7 cm Flak 43; 1,000 rounds
- Secondary armament: 1× 7.92 mm Maschinengewehr 34 machine gun 1,350 rounds
- Engine: 12-cylinder Maybach HL120 TRM; 300 PS (296 hp, 221 kW gasoline)
- Power/weight: 12 PS/tonne
- Suspension: leaf spring
- Operational range: 200 km (120 mi)
- Maximum speed: 38 km/h (24 mph)

The Flakpanzer IV "Ostwind" (East Wind in English) was a German self-propelled anti-aircraft gun based on the Panzer IV tank. It was developed in 1944 as a successor to the earlier Flakpanzer IV/2 cm Vierling Wirbelwind and produced at the Ostbau Works plant.

The Panzer IV's turret was removed and replaced with an open-top, hexagonal turret that housed a 3.7 cm Flak 43. In addition to its intended role as an anti-aircraft weapon, the fast-firing gun was highly effective against light vehicles. While a closed-top design was preferred, this was precluded by the amount of smoke generated by the gun.

The Ostwind's main improvement over the Wirbelwind was its armament. While the Wirbelwind was armed with the 2 cm Flak 38, the Ostwind was armed with the more powerful and longer range FlaK 43's. It also featured slightly better armor on its turret. The Flak 43 had a lower rate of fire than the 2 cm Flak 38. To solve this problem a project was undertaken to arm the Ostwind with two 37 mm cannons, known as the Ostwind II. A single prototype was built but the war ended before anything truly became of it.

Although an order for 100 vehicles was placed in August 1944, only 44 vehicles were completed (22 converted from existing Panzer IVs and 22 new production vehicles) from December 1944 to March 1945.

== Comparable vehicles ==
- Möbelwagen – (Nazi Germany)
- 40M Nimród – (Hungary)
- M19 Multiple Gun Motor Carriage – (United States)
- Crusader Mk. III Anti-Aircraft Tank Mk. I – (United Kingdom)
- ZSU-37 – (Soviet Union)
- 40 mm cannon armed AMX-13 – (France)

== Bibliography ==
- Doyle, Hilary Louis & Jentz, Thomas L. (2023). Flakpanzer IV and Other Flakpanzer Projects. Panzer Tracts. Vol. 12–1 (revised ed.). Old Heathfield, UK: Panzerwrecks. ISBN 978-1-915969-18-7.
