= ZSU-37 =

Soviet self-propelled anti-aircraft gun

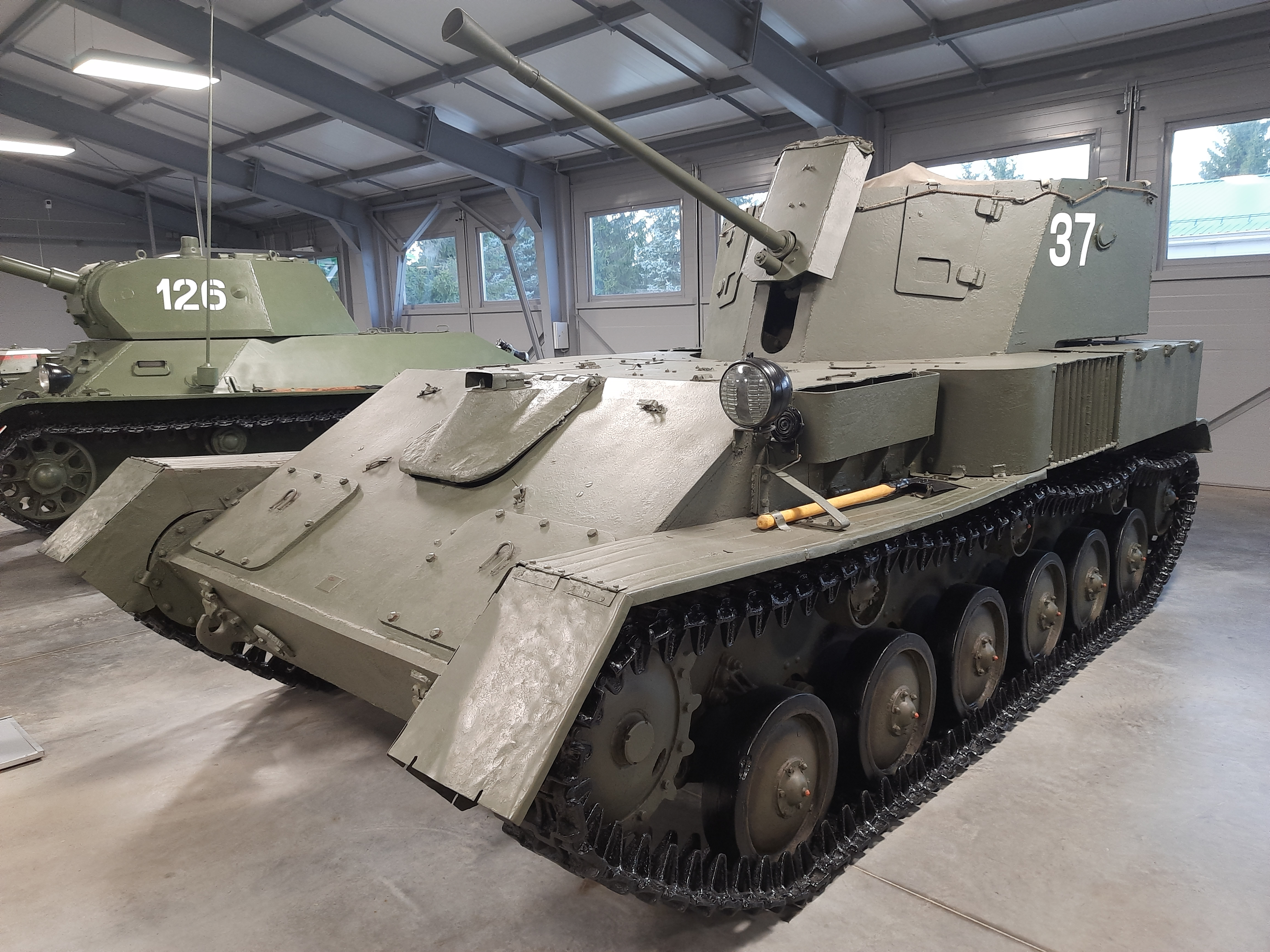
- ZSU-37 in the Kubinka Tank Museum
- Type: Self-propelled anti-aircraft gun
- Place of origin: Soviet Union

Specifications
- Mass: 11.5 tonnes
- Length: 5,250 mm (17 ft 3 in)
- Width: 2,750 mm (9 ft)
- Height: 2,180 mm (7 ft 2 in)
- Crew: 6 men
- Shell: 37 × 252 mmSR
- Shell weight: 0.8 kg
- Caliber: 37mm
- Barrels: 1
- Armor: 6–35 mm
- Main armament: 1 x 37 mm 61-K mod. 1939 anti-aircraft autocannon (320 rounds)
- Engine: forced GAZ-203 (two tandem 6-cylinder row liquid-cooled gasoline engines GAZ-202); 160 hp (120 kW)
- Suspension: torsion bar
- Operational range: Road: 360 km (220 mi); Off-road: 230 km (140 mi)
- Maximum speed: Road: 45 km/h (28 mph); Off-road: 30 km/h (19 mph)

ZSU-37 was a Soviet-made, light, self-propelled anti-aircraft gun (SPAAG), developed by the end of 1943 and produced at Works No. 40 in Mytishchi. It was the first Soviet series-produced tracked SPAAG. ZSU stands for Zenitnaya Samokhodnaya Ustanovka (Russian: Зенитная Самоходная Установка), meaning "anti-aircraft self-propelled mount".

== History ==
Soviet engineers carried out some early experiments with tracked SPAAGs before and during World War II, including a modification of the T-70 light tank, resulting in the experimental T-90 SPAAG which was armed with two 12.7 mm DShKT heavy machine guns (the prototype was built in November 1942 by GAZ). The T-70 light tank would eventually be further developed into the SU-76 light self-propelled gun chassis, which in turn was to become the base for the ZSU-37 SPAAG using M1939 anti-aircraft gun. It was decided to use the chassis of the SU-76M in order to speed up and cheapen the production of the much needed tracked and armoured SPAAGs.

The ZSU-37 was produced from March 1944 to 1948, and 375 vehicles were built in total (only a few vehicles were produced before the war ended, due to temporary manufacturing technology). As a result of its late production and the almost non-appearance of the few remaining Luftwaffe aircraft in the spring of 1944, the ZSU-37 saw no service in World War II. An experimental self-propelled anti-aircraft artillery battalion equipped with 30 ZSU-37 SPAAGs was formed by the end of 1945.

After World War II it became clear that the low rate of fire and firepower of a single 37 mm AA gun was not effective against high-speed low altitude targets. The anti-aircraft artillery crews found it difficult to manually track fast-moving targets. SPAAGs based on a light tank chassis also had quite low manœuvrability in difficult terrain and low off-road speed and range in comparison with medium tanks and self-propelled guns (SPG)s, which the ZSU-37 was meant to protect. The two tandem engines used on the SU-76M chassis required gasoline fuel, which was sometimes a problem in tank units equipped with diesel-engined tanks. The ZSU-37 was retired from service because of the aforementioned reasons soon after series production was stopped.

An effort was made to significantly increase the firepower by mounting the same 37 mm gun into a quad-mount on a T-34 medium tank chassis, but the vehicle never left the design stage as it was recommended by the Technical Council of the Ministry of Transport to use a newer tank chassis and the more powerful S-68 57 mm twin anti-aircraft autocannon, which was being developed at the time. The next step in Soviet tracked SPAAG technology would come with the ZSU-57-2, which was based on the T-54 medium tank chassis and was mass-produced in 1957–1960.

From 1957, design and development work began on new, radar-guided SPAAGs, namely the ZSU-23-4 Shilka and the ZSU-37-2 Yenisei – a new design (unrelated to the ZSU-37) and based on the chassis of the SU-100P self-propelled gun. Both were intended mainly as replacements for the ZSU-57-2. Development of the Yenisei was cancelled in 1962 and the ZSU-23-4 Shilka entered production, armed with quad 23 mm AZP-23 Amur anti-aircraft autocannons.

== Description ==
The ZSU-37 SPAAG was based on the chassis of the SU-76M, on which it was mounted an open-top turret armed with one 37 mm 61-K mod. 1939 anti-aircraft autocannon. The vehicle was equipped with an automatic sight of the distance-type with two collimators, a stereo range finder with a 1-meter base, a 12RT-3 radio, a TPU-3F intercom system and mechanical aiming mechanisms with two rates of angular motion for adequate speed and smoothness of aiming (the traverse mechanism had a foot switch of rates).

The crew consisted of six men: a driver, an aimer for azimuth, an aimer for elevation, a sight adjuster for target speed and range, a sight adjuster for target course and dive angle, and a loader.

The ZSU-37 was based on the SU-76M because it also shared its technical drawbacks and advantages, the most discussed of which was the open-top turret. To protect the crew from rain and snow the gun compartment could be covered with tarpaulin, however the gun could not be fully elevated when this was done. The open turret had advantages, such as high elevation angle, excellent visibility for the gunners and no need for ventilation. Light and manoeuvrable, the ZSU-37 was considered quite an effective SPAAG in the mid-1940s. However, it had insufficient off-road capabilities to accompany medium and heavy tanks in difficult terrain.

Ammunition consisted of 320 armour-piercing, fragmentation incendiary and fragmentation rounds (all with tracers). 130 rounds were in 5-round clips and 190 rounds were loose without clips. Armour-piercing composite rounds could be used against enemy light tanks. Muzzle velocity was between 890 and 920 m/s depending on projectile type, the armour-piercing shell weighed 0.785 kg, fragmentation shells weighed 0.732 kg. The autocannon could be depressed and elevated manually between -5° and +85°. Cyclic rate of fire was 120 to 130 rounds per minute while the practical rate of fire was about 50 to 60 rounds per minute. Maximum combat vertical fire was 2,500 m while the maximum vertical range was 6,500 m.

The vehicle could cross 0.67 m high vertical obstacles, 2 m wide trenches, ford 0.9 m deep water obstacles and climb 25° gradients. Transmission and undercarriage were identical to those of the SU-76M SPG. The engine was also the same but forced from 140 hp on SU-76M to 160 hp - a GAZ-203 which consisted of two tandem GAZ-202 6-cylinder row liquid-cooled gasoline engines, each producing 80 hp (63 kWt) at 3600 rpm.

== Variants ==
- SU-72 - single SPAAG prototype. It was built by GAZ in the autumn of 1942. Based on the T-60 and T-70 light tank designs, it was armed with a 37 mm 61-K mod. 1939 anti-aircraft autocannon in a fixed turret. The unsatisfactory performance of the engine cooling system was discovered during ground tests, also GAZ needed a significant change to its production operation to organize the serial production of new types of vehicles which was impossible during wartime.
- SU-11 - single SPAAG prototype. Built by Works No. 38 in Kirov in November 1942. It was based on the T-60 and T-70 light tank designs, it was also armed with a 37 mm 61-K mod. 1939 anti-aircraft autocannon in a rotating turret. The official tests were performed in December 1942 but the vehicle did not go into production.
- SU-17 (ZSU-37 of Works No. 38) - SPAAG prototype, three were built between December 1943 and July 1944, (the last two vehicles were built by Works No. 40, which manufactured SU-76M SPGs since Works No. 38 did not have all necessary equipment for serial production of SPAAGs). It was based on the SU-76M chassis and armed with a 37 mm 61-K mod. 1939 anti-aircraft autocannon. The first prototype, which was built in December 1943, passed official tests in February 1944; only minor defects were found. The second prototype was built in the spring of 1944, it was 1.2 tonnes lighter, equipped with a 6-cylinder gasoline engine ZIS-80MF (98.5 hp) instead of a GAZ-203 (two tandem 6-cylinder gasoline engines GAZ-202, each producing 70 hp). It had a different type of rotating turret. It was found during ground tests in July 1944 that the ZIS-80MF engine did not provide enough power, so the third improved prototype with a previous engine system (GAZ-203) was built in the summer of 1944. That vehicle passed its ground tests in October–November 1944 successfully and became a direct predecessor of the series-produced ZSU-37.
- ZSU-37 - series-produced vehicle, manufactured from 1945 until 1948 by Works No. 40 in Mytishchi (375 vehicles were produced).

== Preservation status ==
The experimental SU-11 vehicle is on display at the Kubinka Tank Museum in Russia.

== Comparable vehicles ==
- Möbelwagen – (Nazi Germany)
- Ostwind – (Nazi Germany)
- M15 Combination Gun Motor Carriage – (United States)
- Crusader Mk. III Anti-Aircraft Tank Mk. I – (United Kingdom)
- 40M Nimrod – (Hungary)

== See also ==
- List of Soviet tanks
- ZSU-23-4 Shilka
- ZSU-57-2
- 2K22 Tunguska
