= Flakpanzer I =

German self-propelled anti-aircraft gun

- Flakpanzer Is on the Eastern Front
- Type: Self-propelled anti-aircraft gun
- Place of origin: Nazi Germany

Service history
- In service: 1941–1943
- Used by: Wehrmacht
- Wars: World War II

Production history
- Designer: Krupp
- Produced: 1941
- No. built: approx. 24

Specifications
- Mass: 5.5 tons
- Crew: 4
- Main armament: 1 × 2 cm Flak 38
- Engine: Krupp M 305 four-cylinder air-cooled gasoline engine 60 PS (59 hp, 44 kW)
- Operational range: 145 km (road) or 100 km (off-road)
- Maximum speed: 37 km/h

The 2 cm Flak 38 auf Panzer I Ausführung A, commonly known as the Flakpanzer I, was a rare self-propelled anti-aircraft gun conversion of the Panzer I in use by the military of Nazi Germany during World War II.

== Development ==
The Flakpanzer I was developed during the Battle of France when it was recognized that the motorised Flak was insufficiently armoured. The German Heereswaffenamt decided to combine light anti-aircraft guns with tank chassis. The chassis of the Panzer I was used for these conversions, simply because it was available. The conversions were done by Stoewer.

In total, 24 of these vehicles were built. During the conversion, parts of the frontal superstructure and the complete cover of the engine compartment were removed to gain more flat space to stand on. To achieve a better centre of gravity the frontal armour of the superstructure was moved about 18mm forward. The flaps on the side were made from simple sheet metal and did not offer real protection. When in action they were folded down and used to stand on. To gain more space (the Panzer I was a very small armoured vehicle) the radio was dismounted; communication was done with hand signals. The vehicles were armed with the Flak 38; additionally, the crew was armed with small arms, like the Karabiner 98k. To make it easier for the driver to enter the vehicle, the main gun was mounted not centrally, but slightly to the right. The ammunition was stored under the driver's seat and behind the loader. Due to insufficient space inside the vehicle, a coupling for the Sonderanhänger 51 trailer was added, with additional ammunition and replacement barrels for the gun transported in the trailer. The conversion led to the chassis being overloaded. This, combined with worn engines, gave overall poor performance.

== Service ==
Only one unit, the Fla.-Btl.(mot) 614 (Motorized Flak Battalion 614) was equipped with the Flakpanzer I. The unit was assembled in 1941 and in the same year was stationed in Romania. From there they moved into the southern part of the eastern front. In service the underarmed vehicles were of limited use against aircraft, but were mostly used against ground targets. Due to the insufficient protection of the crew in this sort of deployment, they suffered high losses. The companies of the battalion were assigned to other units for this. The whole battalion was wiped out in 1943 during the Battle of Stalingrad, even though most of the vehicles had probably been abandoned or destroyed already.
