= Möbelwagen =

Flakpanzer IV "Möbelwagen"
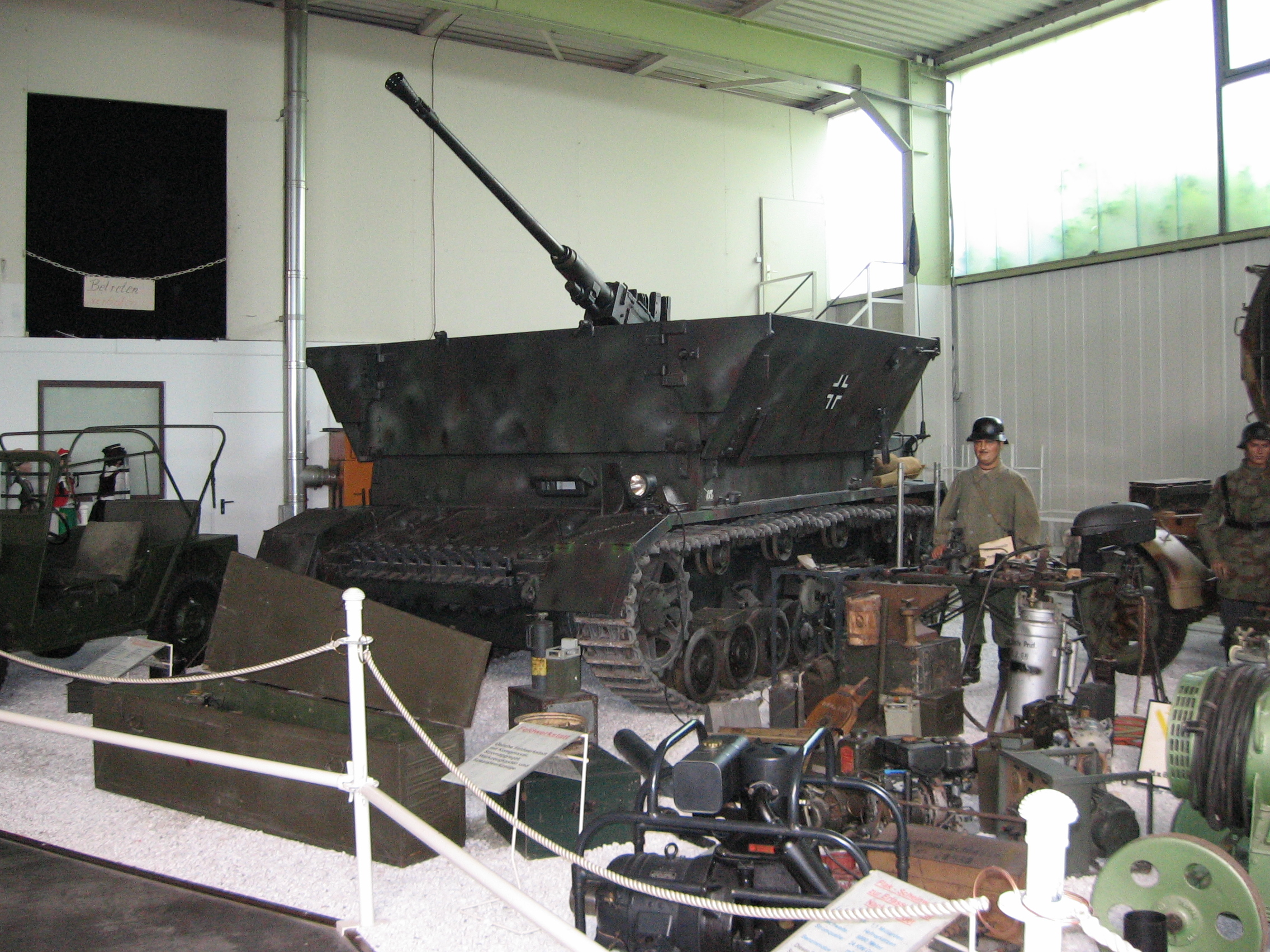
- Museum display with an incorrect Bofors 40/60 gun.
- Type: Self-propelled anti-aircraft gun
- Place of origin: Nazi Germany

Production history
- Manufacturer: Deutsche Eisenwerke
- Produced: March 1944 — March 1945
- No. built: 240

Specifications
- Mass: 24 tonnes
- Length: 5.92 m (19 ft 5 in)
- Width: 2.95 m (9 ft 8 in)
- Height: 2.73 m (8 ft 11 in)
- Crew: 6
- Armor: 10 - 80 mm
- Main armament: 1 × 3.7 cm Flak 43; 416 rounds
- Secondary armament: 1 × 7.92mm MG 34; 600 rounds
- Engine: 12-cylinder Maybach HL120 TRM; 300 PS (296 hp, 221 kW)
- Power/weight: 12.5 PS/tonne
- Suspension: Leaf spring
- Operational range: 200 km (120 mi)
- Maximum speed: 38 km/h (24 mph)

The 3.7 cm Flak auf Fahrgestell Panzerkampfwagen IV (sf) (Sd.Kfz. 161/3), nicknamed Möbelwagen ("Moving Van") because of its boxy shape, was a self-propelled anti-aircraft gun built from the chassis of the Panzer IV tank. It was used by the Wehrmacht in the European Theatre of World War II.

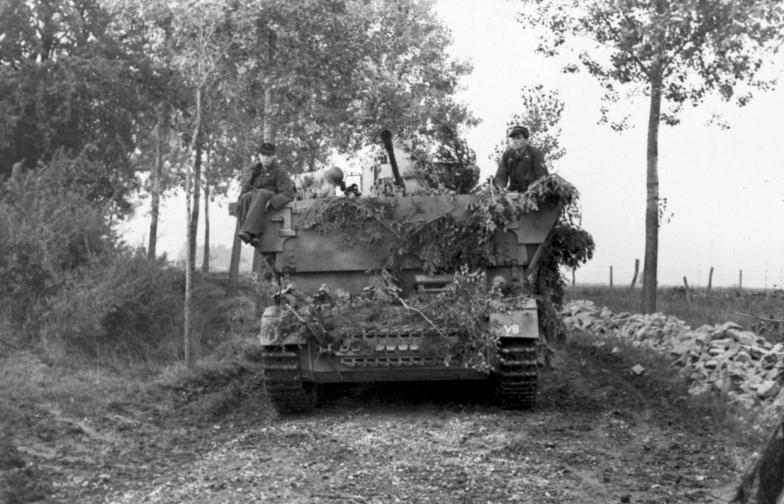
Möbelwagen in northern France, June 21, 1944

In 1943, due to the waning ability of the Luftwaffe to combat enemy ground-attack aircraft, ground-based anti-aircraft weaponry was becoming increasingly important to the Wehrmacht. In early 1943, the idea of creating a gun platform on the chassis of the Panzer IV was first proposed. The prototype displayed to Hitler on December 7, 1943, used the 2 cm Flakvierling 38, which was deemed too weak for the latest aircraft, which were constantly being improved to fly higher and faster. Only a single prototype with this gun was produced before the design was rejected. A second design with an upgraded single 3.7 cm Flak 43 L/89 was approved as a temporary stopgap until better Flakpanzers could be created. 240 Möbelwagens were built with production beginning in March 1944 and continuing until around April 1945. The first 24 units arrived on the Western Front in June of 1944.

The Möbelwagen was built on Panzer IV chassis that had been damaged on the Eastern Front and returned to the factory for repair. These were fitted with an open-top superstructure that provided the gun mount. The first 20 units produced had walls made of two spaced 12 mm thick armored plates. The next 25 produced had 10 mm armored walls. Once it was determined that spaced armor at this thickness offered no benefits to protection, they were replaced with single-piece 25 mm plates with the upper angle removed (later models had 20 mm plates). These plates had two operating positions: they could be lowered for full 360 degree traverse, allowing flat or low-level firing (it was found that the 3.7 cm gun was very useful against soft and lightly armored ground units), or they could be half-closed, being pinned together to hang slightly open. In this position, the gun had full 360 degree rotation, but only for firing at airborne targets. For ground targets the front wall had to be lowered at least partially. Lowering the walls left the crew extremely vulnerable. The fully closed position was only used for transport, in order to give the crew some protection from small arms fire and shrapnel.

Though intended to be a stopgap solution, the Möbelwagen served the anti-aircraft platoons of the Panzer Divisions on the Western Front. Only 240 were produced, and it was eventually succeeded by the first true Flakpanzers: Wirbelwind and Ostwind, both of which featured full rotation and protection while firing at both air and ground targets. A surviving example can be found at the Auto + Technik Museum in Sinsheim, Germany.

== Comparable vehicles ==
- 40M Nimród – (Hungary)
- Ostwind – (Nazi Germany)
- Wirbelwind – (Nazi Germany)
- M19 Multiple Gun Motor Carriage – (United States)
- Crusader Mk. III Anti-Aircraft Tank Mk. I – (United Kingdom)
- ZSU-37 – (Soviet Union)

== Bibliography ==
- Doyle, Hilary Louis & Jentz, Thomas L. (2023). Flakpanzer IV and Other Flakpanzer Projects. Panzer Tracts. Vol. 12–1 (revised ed.). Old Heathfield, UK: Panzerwrecks. ISBN 978-1-915969-18-7.
