= Wirbelwind =

Flakpanzer IV "Wirbelwind"
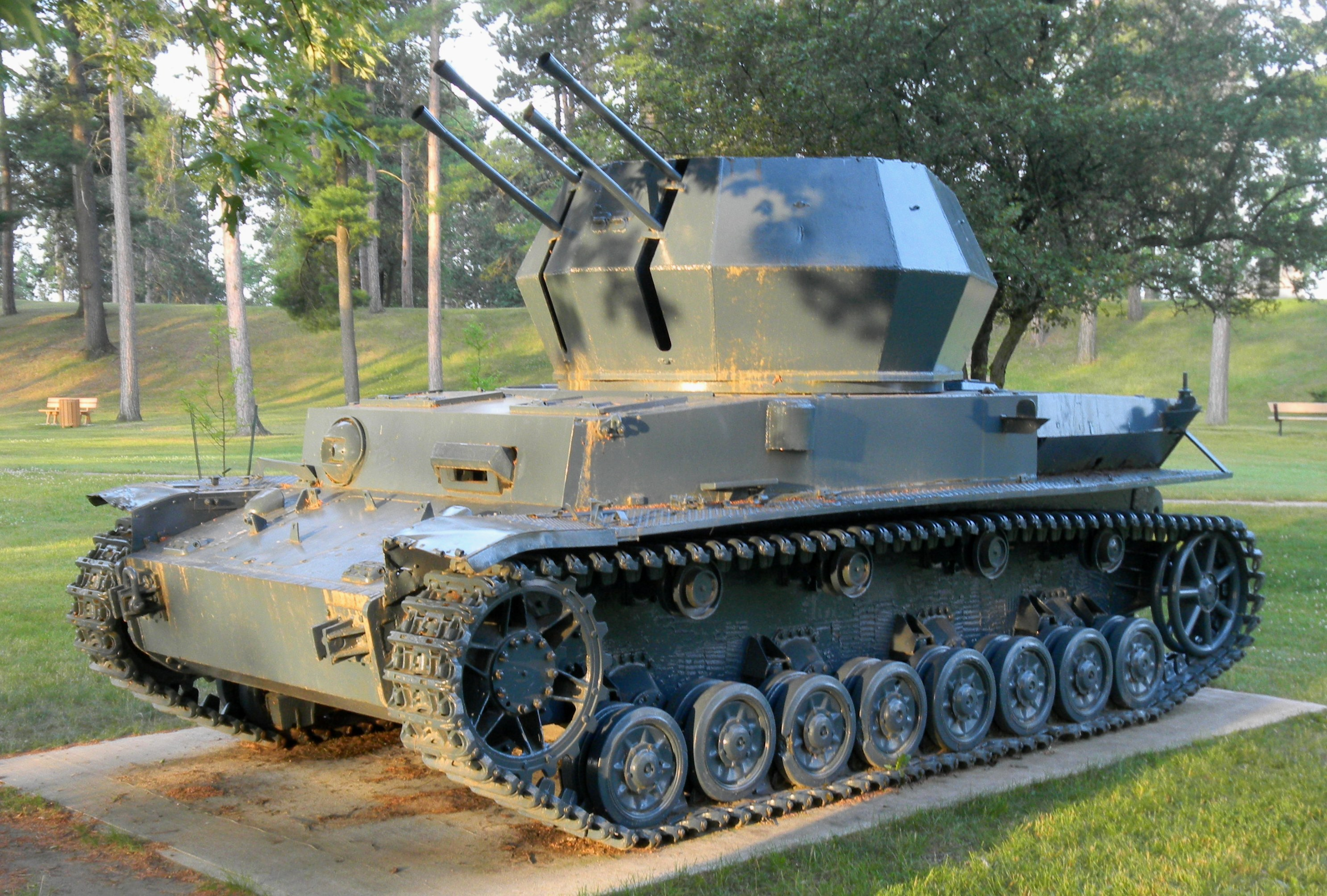
- Wirbelwind at CFB Borden
- Type: Self-propelled anti-aircraft gun
- Place of origin: Nazi Germany

Production history
- Designed: 1944
- Manufacturer: conversions by Ostbau Werke
- Produced: 1944-1945
- No. built: 87-105

Specifications
- Mass: 22 tonnes (48,501 lb)
- Length: 5.89 m (19 ft 4 in)
- Width: 2.88 m (9 ft 5 in)
- Height: 2.76 m (9 ft 1 in)
- Crew: 5 (commander/gunner, two loaders, driver, radio operator)
- Armor: 10 to 80 mm (0.39 to 3.15 in)
- Main armament: 1 × quad 2 cm Flak 38
- Secondary armament: 1 × 7.92 mm MG 34 Panzerlauf
- Engine: 12-cylinder Maybach HL120 TRM; 300 PS (296 hp, 221 kW)
- Power/weight: 13.6 PS/tonne
- Payload capacity: 3,200 rounds 2 cm 1,350 rounds 7.92 mm
- Suspension: Leaf spring
- Operational range: 200 km (124 miles)
- Maximum speed: 40 km/h (25 mph)

The Flakpanzer IV "Wirbelwind" (Whirlwind in English) was a German self-propelled anti-aircraft gun based on the Panzer IV tank. It was developed in 1944 as a successor to the earlier Möbelwagen self-propelled anti-aircraft gun.

== History ==
In the first years of World War II, the German military forces had less interest in developing self-propelled anti-aircraft guns, but as the Allies began to gain air superiority, the need for more mobile and better-armed self-propelled anti-aircraft guns increased. During the early summer of 1944, SS-Hauptsturmführer Karl Wilhelm Krause with the 12th SS Panzer Division Hitlerjugend came up with the concept of the Flakpanzer IV Wirbelwind. He presented the concept to SS-Obersturmbannführer Max Wünsche, commanding officer of the 12th SS Panzer Regiment and it was approved by Adolf Hitler.

The Panzer IV's turret was removed and replaced with an open-top, nine-sided turret that housed a 2 cm Flakvierling 38, a quadruple mount of 20 mm cannon. A closed-top design would have been preferable, but this was not possible due to the heavy smoke generated by the four anti-aircraft guns. The shape of the turret earned it the nickname Keksdose ("biscuit tin"). Production of the tank was carried out by Ostbau Werke in Sagan, Silesia.

While the turret's four barrels were capable of firing 2 cm shells at a high rate, it lacked range and was sometimes ineffective unless several shells hit an aircraft at once. Thus a more powerful successor, with an armament that hit harder and at longer range, was produced which eventually replaced it. Known as the Flakpanzer IV Ostwind ("East Wind"), the successor was equipped with a single 3.7 cm Flak 43.

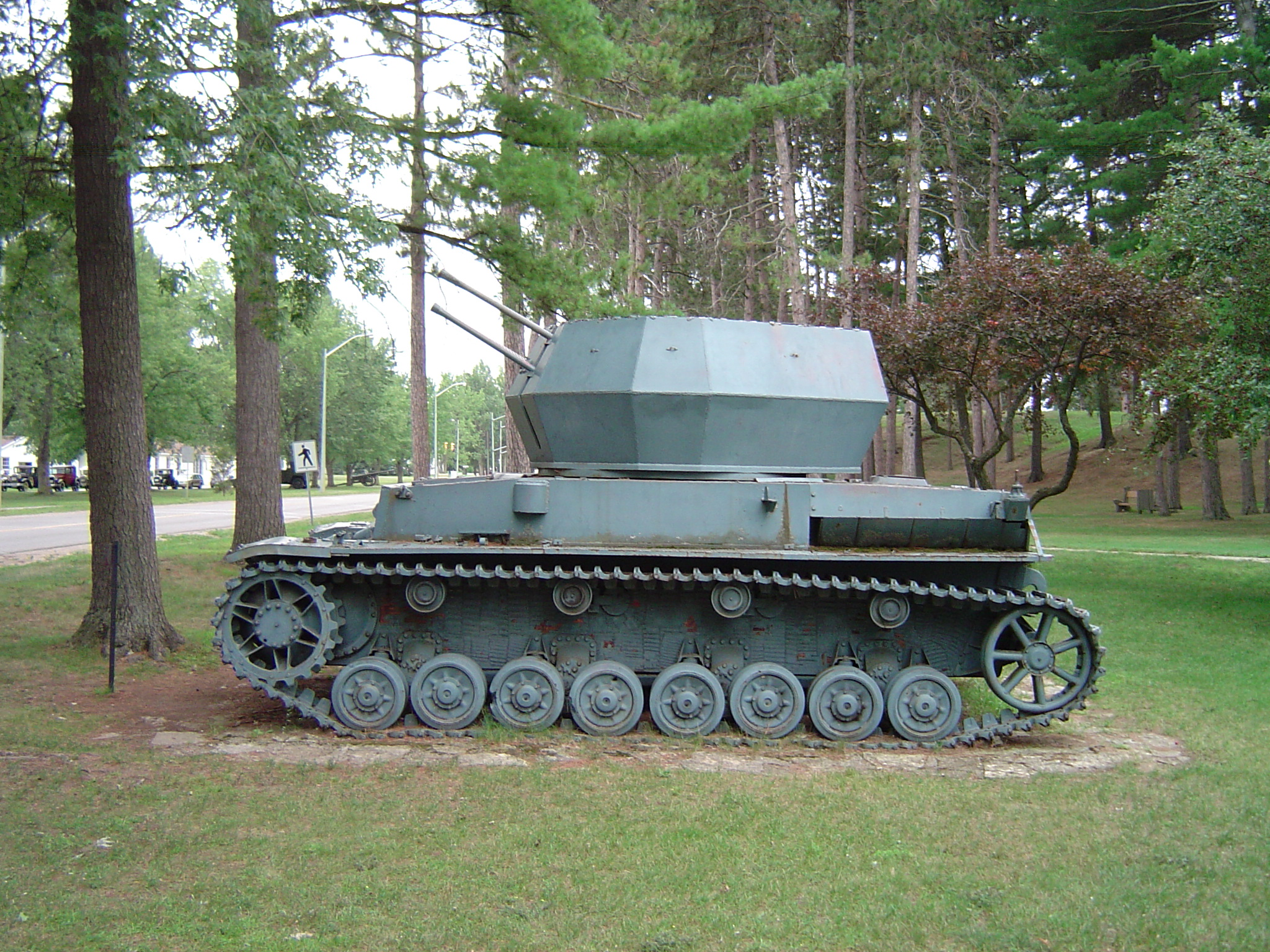
Side view of Wirbelwind at CFB Borden

The combination of armor and rapid fire from the four guns of the Wirbelwind also made it very effective against lightly armoured ground targets such as trucks and armored cars; infantry were particularly vulnerable.

Between 87 and 105 Wirbelwinds were converted from repaired Panzer IV chassis, but due to discrepancies between the recorded production numbers at Ostbau Werke and Wehrmacht service records, the actual number may never be known.

== Surviving vehicles ==
- Militärhistorische Ausstellung Flugabwehr, Kiel (Germany) (Historical Military Anti-aircraft Exhibition)
- Base Borden Military Museum

The Wirbelwind at CFB Borden is currently undergoing a full running and firing restoration by the Borden military museum by military and volunteers.
