= List of WWII Maybach engines =

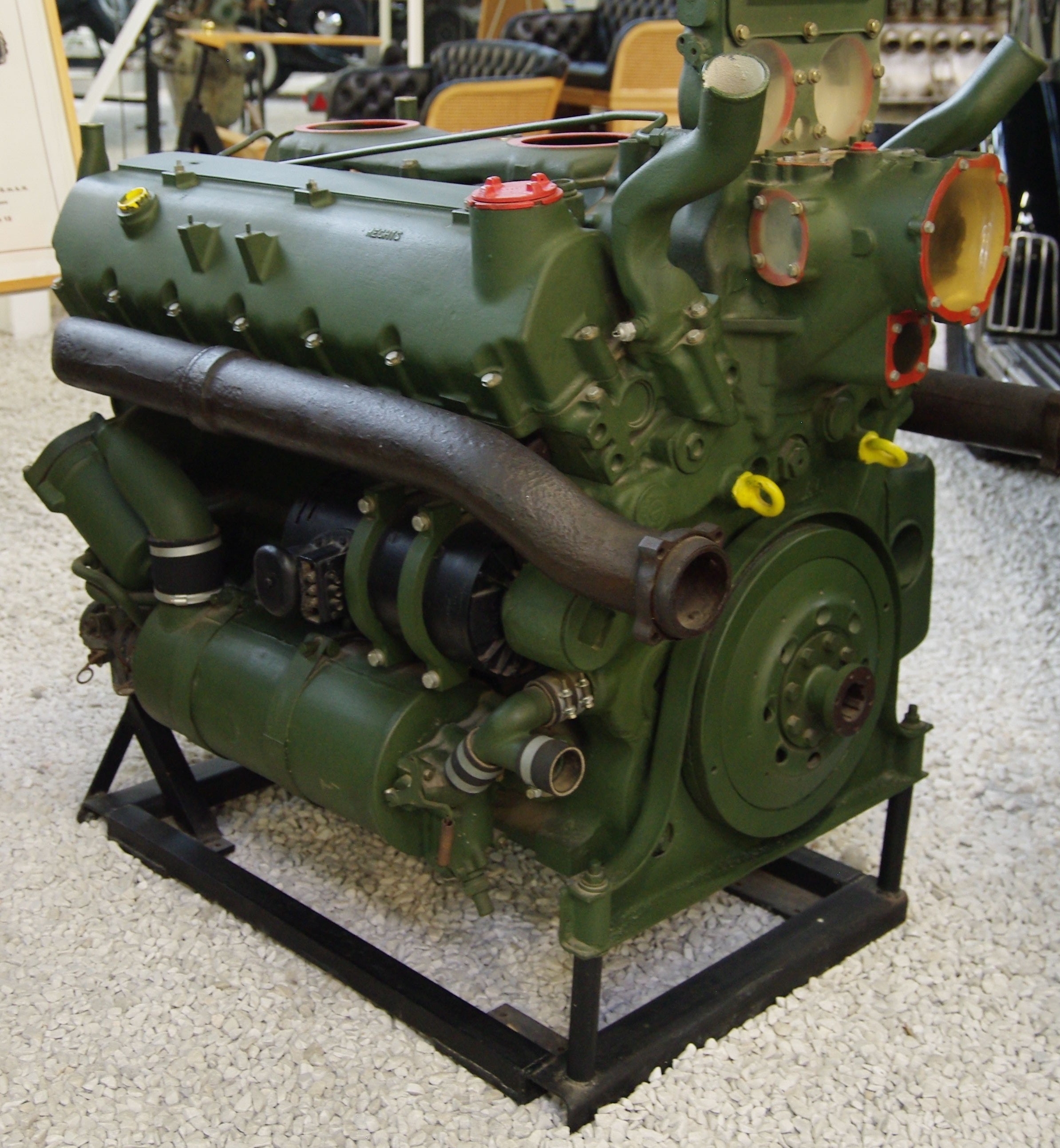
V-12 Maybach HL230 P30, developing 700 PS. (Note: The HL230 P30 can be identified by twin central magneto housings between twin coolant ducts (white interiors), and the oil filter at approx. 45°.)

This is an incomplete list of gasoline engines designed by Maybach AG, manufactured by Maybach and other firms under licence, and fitted in various German tanks (German: Panzerkampfwagen, French: chars blindés) and half-tracks before and during World War II. Until the mid-1930s, German military vehicle manufacturers could source their power plants from a variety of engine makers; by October 1935 the design and manufacture of almost all tank and half-track engines was concentrated in one company, Maybach AG, located in Friedrichshafen on Lake Constance, S. Germany.

Friedrichshafen was also home to the Zahnradfabrik (ZF) factory which made gearboxes for Panzer III, IV, and Panther tanks. Both Maybach and ZF (and Dornier) were originally subsidiaries of Luftschiffbau Zeppelin GmbH, which also had a factory in the town.

The firm designed and made a wide range of 4, 6, and 12-cylinder engines from 2.5 to 23 litres; these powered the basic chassis designs for approximately ten tank types (including tank hunters and assault guns), six half-track artillery tractor designs, plus two series of derived armoured personnel carriers. Maybach also designed a number of gearboxes fitted to these vehicles, made under licence by other manufacturers. (Note: e.g. the Maybach SRG 32 8 145, installed in the Panzer III Ausf. E-G;, not further discussed in this article.)

Maybach used various combinations of factory letter codes (discussed below) which specified the particular ancillaries to be supplied with each engine variant: the same basic model could be fitted in a number of vehicles, according to the original manufacturer's design requirements. For example, the basic 3.8 and 4.2 litre straight-6 engines (the NL38 and HL42) fitted in various half-tracks could be supplied in at least 9 different configurations, although every component was to be found in a single unified parts list.

However, as the war progressed, a number of problems hampered the German armaments production effort. The factory's inability to manufacture enough complete engines as well as a huge range of spare parts, meant that there was often a lack of both. Conflicts between the civilian Reich Ministry of Armaments and Munitions and the German Army led to a failure to set up an adequate distribution system, and consequent severe shortages of serviceable combat vehicles. In April 1944 an Allied bombing raid put the Maybach factory out of action for several months, and destroyed the ZF gearbox factory.

By the end of the war Maybach had produced over 140,000 engines and 30,000 semi-automatic transmissions for the German Wehrmacht.

== Maybach history, 1935–1945 ==
In order to rationalise Germany's military vehicle production, sweeping changes were made to its entire automotive industry. The re-organisation was overseen by Oberbaurat Heinrich Ernst Kniepkamp, head of Wa.Prüf. 6 (Weapons Inspectorate 6, responsible for tanks, armoured vehicles and motorized equipment) of the Heereswaffenamt (HWA). By late October 1935, Maybach had been designated the sole designer and manufacturer of tank and half-track engines for the entire Wehrmacht, with production later outsourced to other firms including its subsidiary Nordbau (Norddeutsche Motorenbau GmbH) in the south-eastern Berlin suburb of Niederschöneweide beside the River Spree.

Maybach AG made very few complete parts of its engines at all. Almost everything was bought in from other suppliers. Its main activity was precision machining of the castings and forgings of its own design, made by outside manufacturers, and producing complete assembled engines on a separate assembly line. Completely finished crankshafts were supplied by Deutsche Edelstahlwerke AG, in Remscheid- de:Hasten. (Note: Deutsche Edelstahlwerke AG was founded in 1927 out of Vereinigte Stahlwerke as a conglomerate of high-grade and stainless steel manufacturers, including the firm of de:Richard Lindenberg AG in Remscheid-Hasten. Using the electric Héroult-Lindenberg process, the firm produced the world's first commercial cast steel by the electric arc furnace method (electro-steel) in 1906. It swiftly began to replace crucible steel for making high-quality cast steel alloys.) In addition, machined pistons (Mahle KG), piston rings, roller and ball bearings, fuel pumps, carburettors (Solex), and complete electrical equipment (Bosch) were acquired as finished parts from outside sources.

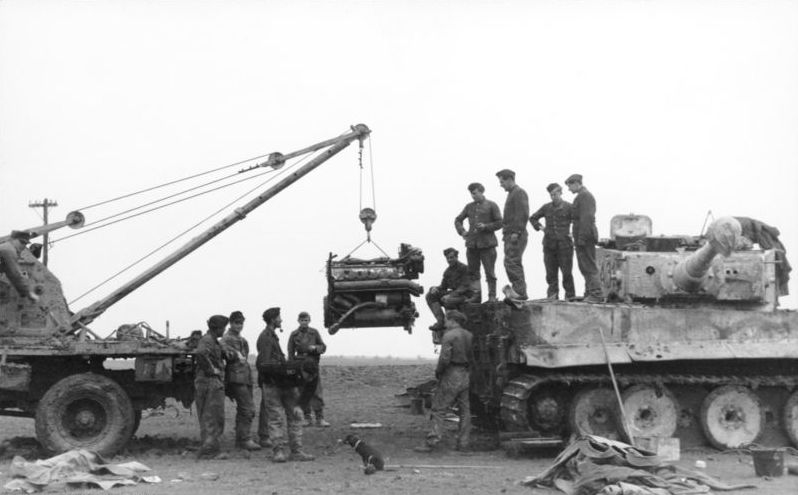
A Tiger tank undergoing an engine swap (HL230 P45), Romania 1944. (Note: This is Tiger A31, 3. Zug, 9. Kompanie, of III./Panzer-Regiment Großdeutschland. (i.e. Platoon leader's tank, 3rd Platoon, 9th Company, 3rd Battalion, Panzer-Regiment Großdeutschland. The crane is a Bilstein-Drehkran on a Büssing-NAG 4500 A (A=Allrad, all-wheel drive).)

Although a steady supply of spare parts is essential to an army in the field, the production of complete engines always took priority over providing spares. (Note: (Müller-Hillebrand 1982, p. 21). The lead author of this pamphlet, General Burkhart Müller-Hillebrand worked in the Operational History (German) Section of the US Army Historical Division in Karlsruhe after the war, helping to write operational histories from the German point of view.) According to Albert Speer, Hitler himself never realised this importance: "One of his worst failings was that he simply did not understand the necessity for supplying the armies with sufficient spare parts." (Note: Speer continues: "This disastrous tendency was evident as early as 1942: "Presented the Führer with the monthly list of tank replacement parts and reported that despite the increase in production the demand is so high that to raise the production of spare parts we must decrease the production of new tanks." (Führerprotokoll, May 6–7, 1942, Point 38.) [...] General Guderian, the Inspector General of Tank Ordnance, frequently pointed out to me that if we could repair our tanks quickly, thanks to sufficient spare parts, we could have more available for battle, at a fraction of the cost, than by producing new ones. But Hitler insisted on the priority of new production, which would have had to be reduced by 20 percent if we made provision for such repairs.)

Germany never achieved the industrial capacity needed to keep its military vehicles running efficiently: when the Russian campaign got underway, the deficiencies of the armaments industry and the organisation of maintenance depots became obvious. The German armed forces suffered from continual shortages of spare parts for tanks and half-tracks until the end of the war. When the first Tiger I tanks arrived in Russia in autumn 1942, there was only one spare engine and one transmission for every 10 tanks. A critical lack of spare parts meant that most of them were out of commission within a short period, sometimes for weeks on end. Despite various attempts at re-organisation, friction between the distribution systems of the German Army (das Heer) and the civilian Ministry of Armaments (and from 1944 the 'Rüstungsstab') often led to confrontation and inefficiency. Some of this can be blamed on Karl-Otto Saur of the Ministry of Armaments, whose ruthless drive for greater overall production figures tended to override the need for testing and durability concerns, and the manufacture of enough spare parts.

According to Stieler von Heydekampf, president of the Panzer Kommission from 1943, German tank production was at a major disadvantage throughout the war because the main firms involved were heavy equipment manufacturers. It would have been more effective if the programme had been given to Ford Germany and Opel (owned by General Motors) because of their real mass production experience, but this was not done because of their American associations. (Note: Heydekampf, primarily a production man, had been manager of the Opel Truck division in Brandenburg from c1935. By 1939 he was a director of Henschel, later General Director and Chairman.)

Maybach's monopoly on engine production proved to be the bottleneck in German tank production. From 1942, after the German invasion of the Soviet Union, Maybach started dispersing its manufacturing activities, licensing eight other firms to manufacture its engines. Adler Werke in Frankfurt/Main built the HL42 from January 1942; Saurer Werke in Vienna, Krauss-Maffei (Munich), and Borgward in Bremen were licensed to build the HL62 & HL64; Maschinenfabrik Bahn Bedarf (MBB) in Nordhausen made the HL108, and also the HL120—along with Maybach's subsidiary Nordbau in Berlin and MAN in Nurnberg; and Auto Union in Chemnitz (Siegmar Werke) made HL230s, having tooled up from October 1943–March 1944. Henschel & Sohn in Kassel made large quantities of major components for Maybach in 1943–1944: 2,434 crankshafts, 1,850 crank cases, 32,121 connecting rods and 8,196 'closing covers' (undefined - maybe valve covers or possibly cylinder heads).

Maybach from August 1943 also organised 11 of its own dispersal machining sites located from a few miles away to some 60 miles distant; the finished parts were then sent to a designated factory for assembly. These precautions allowed manufacture of complete engines to take place away from Friedrichshafen. On Hitler's orders in March 1944, the extensive cellars below the town of Leitmeritz (now Litoměřice, Czech Republic) on the river Elbe were to be used for the anticipated assembly for HL120 and HL230 tank engines, in case a manufacturing plant were to be bombed.

Despite these precautions, by late 1943 there was still a severe shortage of spare tank engines. (Note: For example, an official report in September 1943 on the state of various battalions under the command of Panzerjäger-Regiment 656 (including the 653rd Heavy Panzerjäger Battalion) stated that sixty complete HL120 engines (two per tank) were needed to bring the Ferdinand battalions up to strength.(Munch 2005, pp. 62–3) In a long list of other modifications, only two related to the engine: the fuel line needed shielding from the exhaust; and oil leaked onto the fan housing, both leading to fires in the engine compartment.(Munch 2005, p. 64) A total of only 91 Ferdinands were ever built.) Rather than concentrate on proven designs, Maybach continued to bring out new, relatively untested models; the wide variety of engine types seriously hampered efforts to fix the multiple defects which Maybach engines developed under combat conditions. The extreme difficulty of stocking so many spares at the front, several thousand kilometres away from the factory, swiftly led to vehicles being unserviceable for combat. Because the armaments industry was already working at full capacity, it was not possible to completely replace obsolete models with new versions. Instead, the number of tank models and types within each series issued to the field forces increased steadily, which only made the maintenance and repair situation worse.

Severely damaged tanks from the Russian front were initially shipped back to Germany, or to the Nibelungenwerk or the Vienna Arsenal for repair; but the prospect of inevitable delays often meant that vehicles were instead cannibalised at the front for parts. Often when a new engine was delivered, there was little left except the hull of the tank it was intended for. Nevertheless, the maintenance crews did their best, often retrieving knocked-out tanks under considerable difficulties. (Note: For example, up to five 18-ton Sd.Kfz. 9s were needed to haul an immobilised Ferdinand through the mire of the Eastern Front.)

As the war progressed, new Maybach engines tended to be rushed into production, without adequate testing and improvement. As a result, they were viewed as unreliable (although this would be expected of any un-developed engine). (Note: Heinz Guderian, General-inspekteur der Panzertruppen, made an even-handed report about the Panther in July 1943 after Operation Citadel: "The fact that the Panther appeared for the first time on the battlefield focused general interest. Comparisons against losses of other Panzer units were not made. Therefore the high command and troops quickly jumped to the conclusion: The Panther is worthless! "In closing, it should be remarked that the Panther has been proven successful in combat. The high number of mechanical breakdowns that occurred should have been expected since lengthy troop trials have still not been accomplished. The curve of operational Panthers is on the rise. After the deficiencies in the fuel pumps and the motors are corrected, the mechanical breakdowns should remain within normal limits. Without consideration of our own mistakes, the disproportionately high number of losses through enemy action attests to especially heavy combat.") All the 325 new Panther tanks delivered to Russia in early 1943 had to be returned because of serious defects in the steering; they were underpowered by the HL210 P30 engine, and its replacement, the HL230 P30 (which didn't arrive until late 1943) suffered from over-heating, fires in the engine compartment and blown gaskets.

By way of comparison, the Soviet Army used a single basic engine (the V-12 diesel Kharkiv V-2) to power the majority of its tanks – with a few modifications – starting with the BT-7M and its successor the T-34, producing 500 hp (370 kW) @ 1800 rpm in 1939; the SU-85 and SU-100; the KV-1 and KV-2 (600 hp with supercharging in 1939); and the IS-2, ISU-122 and ISU-152 and the T-10. Maybach didn't produce a more powerful acceptable engine until late 1943 with the HL230 P30.

Starting in March 1944, a series of Allied precision and area bombing raids put the Maybach factory out of action for several months. Those of 27/28 April and 20 July especially inflicted heavy damage on the plant. However, engine production continued at the various dispersed machining sites and manufacturers. If the various firms making Maybach motors under license had not been in a position to continue producing engines, the German Army's entire tank program would have been seriously jeopardised.

Although the German Army used various combat vehicles appropriated from other countries, they continued to be powered by their original engines. Maybach engines were fitted to the German fighting vehicles for which they had been designed. (Note: An exception is the Ferdinand tank hunter, originally a petrol-electric design by Ferdinand Porsche, intended to be powered by two Porsche Typ 101 15-litre gasoline V-10 air-cooled engines each developing 310 PS driving electrical generators and motors. The Porsche motors never worked satisfactorily, and two over-stressed, over-heated, HL120 engines were used instead.)

== General design ==
All Maybach engines for AFVs which reached series production were gasoline four-stroke water-cooled designs. The firm's managing director, Dr. Karl Maybach (son of the founder Wilhelm Maybach), had stated that "he was born water cooled and wanted to die water cooled." (Note: Maybach also had considerable experience in designing and manufacturing diesel engines. The enormous pre-war French Char 2C used two Maybach 12-cylinder diesel engines of 250 PS (186.5 kW), originally installed in Zeppelin airships. Maybach designed a series of diesel engines for railroad locomotives, beginning in 1924 with the 'G4a' 6‑cylinder diesel engine producing 150 hp at 1,300 rpm, fitted in a railcar by Eisenbahn Verkehrs AG Wismar (EVA). This was followed in 1932 by the Karl Maybach-designed diesel 'GO5' motor, a V-12 railcar drive of 400 hp, two of which powered the SVT 877, the 'Flying Hamburger'. The post-war GTO6 and GTO6a V-12 diesel engines powered the DB Class V 60 shunters, and the 'MD' series drove the DB-Baureihe VT 08 series.)

Before the war the fuel industry had indicated that petroleum was going to be easier to produce than synthetic diesel, and development of gasoline engines was therefore favoured. By around 1943 the situation had turned around, but by then it was too late to change. Dr. Ferdinand Porsche had consistently pushed for air-cooled diesels, but his organisation's designs never functioned satisfactorily. The twin large Porsche gasoline V-10 engines slated for the Tiger (P) never worked satisfactorily, and two over-worked Maybach HL120s were fitted instead to drive the electric generators and final drive motors in the subsequent Ferdinand.

A number of Maybach motors shared the same basic design but had different engine sizes, the larger engines having bigger cylinders to increase the capacity. Similar engine designs had shared parts lists, e.g. the NL38 and HL42; the HL57 and HL62; and the HL108 and HL120.

The 6-cylinder Maybach engines used a single Solex 40 JFF II down-draught (German: Fallstrom) carburetor, and earlier V-12s used two. Later V-12s used Solex 52 JFFs.

A hand-cranked inertia starter (Schwungkraftanlasser) was fitted to the V-12 engines to supplement the Bosch 24V electric starter motor (powered by two 12V batteries) in cold weather.

== Nomenclature ==
=== Introduction ===
Maybach used a series of letter codes and numbers to identify specific engine models, namely:

- NL / HL – performance
- TU / TR – lubrication
- K – clutch
- R / RR – V-belt drive for compressor and/or radiator fans
- M – "schnapper"-type magneto ignition

Although these codes usually indicate what ancillary equipment was fitted at the factory (e.g. the HL42 TUKRRM and the HL57 TR), there are some exceptions, discussed below.

The individual engine number and its capacity, the model type, and year of manufacture are hand-stamped on each crankcase. On 6-cylinder models with schnapper magneto ignition, this information is found on the magneto housing: e.g.

MOTOR Nr 730192
4198 ccM.
HL42 TUKRM
1943

And on the HL210, stamped at the top end of the crankcase above the flywheel cover:

Mot. Nr. 46302
HL210 P45

=== Performance ===
- NL = Normalleistung (normal performance motor)
- HL = Hochleistung (high performance motor)

This is followed (without space) by the approximate engine capacity (e.g. HL42 = approx. 4.2 litres.)

Compared to the NL motors, the HL (high performance) series had a higher compression ratio, which increased the power output. This advantage was somewhat lost when a mandatory requirement to run on lower-quality OZ 74 (74 octane) gasoline after October 1938 necessitated the compression ratio of the HL series to be lowered, achieved by fitting shorter pistons and a new cylinder head. This may partially explain the similar power outputs of engines with different capacities, shown in the table further below.

=== Lubrication ===
- TR = Trockensumpfschmierung (dry sump lubrication), generally fitted to tanks - because of low ground clearance - and to the Sd.Kfz. 10 and 250 half-tracks. There is no sump below the crankcase: the engine oil is contained in a reservoir on one side. On later V-12s there is a tunnel through the oil reservoir, through which the drive shaft for the hand-cranked inertia starter passes, operated from the outside rear of the vehicle.

In a number of cases, especially the dry sump tank engines (e.g. the HL108 TR), this is the complete designation of an engine: in other words, there is no factory-fitted clutch (K) attached to the engine; no extra drive belts driving a compressor (R) and/or dual fans (RR) on custom pulleys; ignition is achieved by a magneto driven off the camshaft (Steuerwelle) rather fitted in its own housing (M) (Schnapper-magnetzündung); and no specific vehicular installation (P, S, or Z) is implied.

- TU = Tiefer Unterteil ('deep lower part' i.e. wet sump), only fitted to some half-tracks. The sump generally has an inverted triangle shape, bolted to the underneath of the crankcase housing.

Most of the TU (wet sump) type engines were installed in half-track artillery tractors Sd.Kfz 6, 7, 8, 9 and 11, and were fitted with some or all of the ancillaries (K, R, or M). There appear, nevertheless, to be exceptions. For example, the HL57 TU was apparently only installed in some versions of the Sd.Kfz. 7, which was in fact fitted with a factory clutch, integral compressor and magneto. The extra equipment was fitted as standard and the extra letter codes were not included in the model number. (Note: Likewise, the bored-out HL62 TUK engines were also only fitted in some variants of the Sd.Kfz. 7; on these motors the compressor was an integral design part of the engine, and not an ancillary (R) which is thus excluded from the model designation. See also § Compressor.)

In addition, 'T' by itself has no meaning; it is always directly followed by either R or U, but 'R' in this position should not be confused with an (R) signifying a V-belt drive for a compressor (see below). Furthermore, in some sources engines may be referred to simply as e.g. "a Maybach HL 120 of 300 metric horsepower", which indicates that further information is needed to identify the particular model number.

=== Transmission ===
- K = Kupplung or Kupplungsgehäuse (clutch housing): a clutch is attached directly to the flywheel end of the crankshaft, generally driving a manual gearbox with 4 forward speeds and 1 reverse, plus a high/low reduction gearbox, giving 8 forward and 2 reverse ratios (4+1 x2). This type of transmission was fitted to all the half-tracks with a TU-type engine, and to early Panzer Is. The transmission could also have a rear power take-off (PTO) shaft fitted to power a winch. The Sd.Kfz. 10 had a unique arrangement with a conventional clutch attached to the engine driving a pre-selector Maybach 'Variorex' VG 102 128H gearbox. See also § Compressor below.

Maybach HL120 TRM engine and Maybach-Variorex SRG 32 8 145 pre-selector gearbox, fitted to Panzer III Ausf. E–G (in German). Click picture for English translation.

- If there is no factory-fitted clutch (K), this indicates a tank engine (except early Panzer Is and later Panzer IIIs). (Note: The HL120 TRM was in fact fitted with a clutch in the Panzer III Ausf. H onwards, but the designation 'HL120 TRMK ' seems not to have been used. The ZF SSG 76 and 77 gearboxes (both supplied with a clutch) were installed in the pre-production Panzer III Ausf. A–D and the Ausf. H–N respectively. Between these two series, the ill-fated semi-automatic Maybach SRG 32 8 145 was used in the Panzer III Ausf. E–G. Maybach's own modified clutch was fitted at the factory as an option: and thus the Maybach HL108 TR and HL120 TRM engines (which differed between the Panzer III and Panzer IV tanks) could be ordered from the manufacturer with or without a clutch, depending on the gearbox. See also HL120 TRM in Table 1) Instead, a horizontal cardan shaft connects the flywheel to a separate gearbox next to the driver. This could be a pneumatically controlled, pre-selector Maybach-Variorex (e.g. Panzer III Ausf. E–G and Stug III Ausf. A); or a manual synchromesh ZF 'Aphon' (e.g. later Panzer III and IVs); or a hydraulically controlled Maybach-Olvar (e.g. Tiger I and II).
  - A 10-speed Maybach-Variorex SRG 32 8 145 gearbox (Note: SRG = Schaltreglergetriebe, 'shift regulator [or controller] gearbox'. Maybach changed the name from SRG to Variorex in 1939. (Spielberger 1994, p. 37).) was fitted in Panzer IIIs Ausf. E–G, operated by vacuum pressure generated in the inlet manifold. The main clutch is integral to the gearbox housing. (See also diagram on right.)
  - Other tank gearboxes included the synchromesh ZF Aphon SSG (Note: SSG =Synchronisierter Sechsgang Getriebe, 'synchronised six-speed gearbox') 5x and 7x series gearboxes (the SSG 75 fitted in early Panzer IV had five forward gears and one reverse: the 76 and 77 had six forward and one reverse). The main clutch (Hauptkupplung) (LA 120 HD) was bolted to the gearbox on the SSG 75, and incorporated into the main housing in the 77. The SSG 77 gearbox replaced the mechanically vulnerable Variorex in the Stug. III Ausf. C. Bigger tank engines (e.g. the HL230 fitted to Tiger Is and IIs) used a hydraulically controlled Maybach-Olvar gearbox such as the Olvar OG 40 12 16 (8 forward gears, 4 reverse), or the ZF AK 7-200 with synchro used in the Panther.
  - Some half-track gearboxes also included a power take-off shaft (PTO) driving an external winch (German: Seilwinde). (Note: Diagram of Sd.Kfz. 9 geartrain at Spielberger 1994, p. 215. Key, from r.: Seilwinde – winch; Untersetzergetriebe – reduction gearbox; Gleiskette – track; Bremszylinder – [air]brake cylinder; Lenkbremse – steering brake; Lenkgetriebe – steering gear; Kupplung – clutch; Luftfilter – air filter; Triebrad – driving wheel; Fahrbremse – road brakes; Triebradenantrieb – drivewheel gearbox; Wechselgetriebe – change speed gearbox.)

=== Compressor ===
- R = Riemenantrieb für Luftpresser (V-belt drive for air compressor), driven at the radiator end by a pulley with an extra groove. Most of the half-track engines had a compressor fitted, to power various types of equipment (discussed below).

On some engines (e.g. the NL38 TUK) the compressor was an integral part of the engine, driven by internal gears and mounted on top of the cam cover at the flywheel end. The compressor is not specifically indicated in the model number. In similar fashion, on the HL 57 TU and 62 TUK the compressor was located in a gear-driven housing next to the clutch on the inlet side. (Note: Photo of HL62 TUK at Spielberger 1993, p. 67)

On other models, the compressor was an external belt-driven ancillary denoted by an (R) in the model number (e.g. HL38 TUKR), it was mounted on one or other side of the engine, driven by an extra V-belt at the radiator end. Thus the lack of an (R) in the model number doesn't necessarily mean that a compressor wasn't fitted. The compressor was used to power various types of equipment, including:

- Sd.Kfz. 11 and 251 – air brakes on towed equipment (e.g. Pak 40 anti-tank gun)
- Sd.Kfz. 6–9 – pneumatic foot/parking brake + towed equipment (e.g. 15 cm sIG 33 towed by the Sd.Kfz 7)

On Panzer IIIs Ausf E, F and G, and Stug III Ausf. A; and on the Sd.Kfz. 10 with its derivative the Sd.Kfz. 250, the vacuum for the gear-changing mechanism is generated in the inlet manifold and stored in a vacuum tank. To shift gears, the pre-selector lever is set in the desired position or slot, and when the next gear is needed, the clutch pedal is depressed for about one second. This opens a valve inside the Variorex gearbox, which operates specific vacuum-actuated pistons attached to selector forks: these move dog clutches, which select the desired gearing. After about one second the driver releases the clutch pedal with the desired gear semi-automatically engaged with minimum effort on the driver's part.

- KR = Clutch and compressor: production versions of the Demag half-tracks, the Sd.Kfz. 10 (manufacturer type D7) and Sd.Kfz. 250 (D7p) were fitted with a Maybach SRG semi-automatic gearbox, type VG 10 2 128H, (Note: VG = Variorex-Getriebe, 'Variorex gearbox'; H = Hohlwelle ('hollow shaft', NB not Hohlachse), [ie 'Power Take-Off', PTO] for "providing power to auxiliary equipment for spreaders and compressors of Sd.Kfz. 10/2 (Entgiftungskw., 'chemical decontaminators') and Sd.Kfz. 10/3 Spruehkw. ('poison gas sprayers').) with 7 forward and 3 reverse gears.
  Although they worked on the same vacuum principle as the bigger tank pre-selector gearboxes (e.g. Variorex SRG 32 8 145, installed in Panzer III Ausf. E-G), these gearbox types had no integral clutch, and were much smaller than those fitted to tanks. The drive passed through a standard clutch attached to the engine via a cardan shaft into the gearbox: depressing and releasing the clutch pedal simultaneously disengaged the main clutch and actuated the vacuum pistons to engage the pre-selected gear ratio.
- KRR = Clutch, compressor, and extra belt drives for radiator fans: fitted to a number of Sd.Kfz. 251 variants, which had a different radiator from the unarmored Sd.Kfz. 11 on which it was based.
  A triple V-belt pulley mounted at the top of the engine also drove the twin cooling fans mounted directly between the engine and the radiator. (Note: "Cette motorisation est redésignée avec une lettre R supplémentaire (R = ventilation séparée), donnant ainsi les NL38 TUKRR, NL38 TUKRRM et HL42 TUKRRM." This roughly translates as 'separate (or forced) ventilation', Fremdbelüftung.)

=== Ignition ===
All Maybach engines used a Bosch 12-volt magneto for the ignition. There were two main types:

- Driven off the camshaft (Steuerwelle) (or the camshaft pinion), located at the top of the engine at the flywheel end. This type of magneto can often be identified at the top of the engine at the flywheel end by a circular, slightly domed cover, and a tubular duct (sometimes corrugated) which fed the ignition leads out of sight behind an engine cover plate. This type of installation (Steuerwelle-Magnetzündung) was part of the standard specification and not included in the model letters (e.g.HL98 TUK). This applies to some 6-cylinder models and some V-12s, e.g. the HL120 TR.
- M = Schnapper-Magnetzündung (impulse magneto ignition|). (Note: With the low starting speed of the engine (e.g. by hand or with a slow-running starter), a magneto ignition system would generate only a very weak or no ignition spark. This type of magneto is equipped with a spring mechanism that additionally accelerates the rotor at low speeds and retards the ignition spark. Once the engine is running properly, the mechanism automatically disengages and the magneto continues in its normal operation. This type of magneto (M) only serves to improve starting performance, and makes no difference at all to the engine's general performance when running. The English name of this device is impulse coupling; in German it is usually referred to as a Schnapper, derived from the clicking sound that these magneto ignitions generate when the device is triggered. The HL210 and HL230 both incorporate Schnapper magnetos, but this not reflected in the model number.) Some 6-cylinder models had this type of magneto in its own housing on the right-hand side, and driven off the starter ring on the flywheel. In V-12s, the magneto is located in the V of the cylinder block, driven off the camshaft pinion. This type of installation is indicated with an (M) in the model number, e.g. HL42 TUKRM, HL120 TRM. (Note: Photos of both types can be seen at "Maybach Motoren". Fahrzeuge der Wehrmacht., e.g. NL38 TR and HL54 TUKRM.)

The sole purpose of the Schnapper magneto was to improve cold starting. It had no effect at all on the overall performance of the engine.
A number of engines of the same basic design were first fitted with the camshaft-driven (Steuerwelle) type and later with the Schnapper type (e.g. HL62 TR/TRM, HL120 TR/TRM). The HL120 TR used two vertically-mounted Steuerwellen Magnetzündern, and the later HL120 TRM Ausführung "A" used in e.g. the Panzer III Ausf. F–N and Stug III Ausf. B–G used a single schnapper-type magneto serving all 12 cylinders, located in the V of the cylinder block at the radiator end. (Note: Photo of damaged HL120 TRM Ausführung "B": Koch 2000, p. 18)
On the HL210 the impulse magnetos are separately located above the ends of the camshafts, and on the HL230 they are centrally installed between the cylinder heads in the fan drive housing. Although the Bosch JGN 6 R 18 magnetos installed in both engines are both of the Schnapper-type, this is not included in the manufacturer's designation, and Maybach's full description is "HL230 P45". Some publications have described the engines as e.g. "HL230 TRM P45", but this is not the case.

Most models were also fitted with a belt-driven Bosch generator for charging the two 12-volt batteries for the 24-volt electric starter motor; and for 12-volt lighting, etc. On 4- and 6-cylinder engines the generator was usually connected by a short drive shaft to the separate belt-driven coolant pump, located close to the cylindrical oil cooler.

=== Installation ===
- P = Panzerkampfwageneinbau (tank installation?)
- Z = Zerstörereinbau (tank destroyer installation?)
- S = Schleppereinbau (military tractor installation?) (Note: One of the few engines with an (S) in its designation is the HL42 TRKMS. According to Jentz and Doyle, they were specially designed for the schwerer Wehrmachtschlepper (s.Ws), the successor to the Sd.Kfz. 5. The engines were built only by Auto Union.)

These letters were only used on some models, e.g. HL42 TRKMS, HL45 Z, HL157 P.

The HL230 P30 and P45 appear to fall into this category, being named according to their original project specification: the HL230 P30 was designed to be fitted in the Panther, whose prototype was the 30-ton class VK30.02; and the HL230 P45 went in the Tiger, whose final 45-ton class prototype was numbered VK45.01.

=== Examples ===
- NL38 TRKM = Normal performance 3.8 litre, dry sump, clutch, schnapper magneto (Panzer I Ausf. B)
- HL42 TUKRRM = High performance 4.2 litres, wet sump, clutch, belt-driven compressor, twin radiator fans, schnapper magneto (Sd.Kfz. 251)
- HL62 TR = High performance 6.2 litre, dry sump, no clutch (K), no external compressor (R), camshaft-driven magneto (no M) (some Panzer II)
- HL108 TUKRM = High performance 10.8 litre, wet sump, clutch, belt-driven compressor, schnapper magneto (Sd.Kfz. 9)
- HL120 TRM = High performance 12.0 litre, dry sump, no clutch (K), schnapper magneto (Panzer III)

== Gallery ==
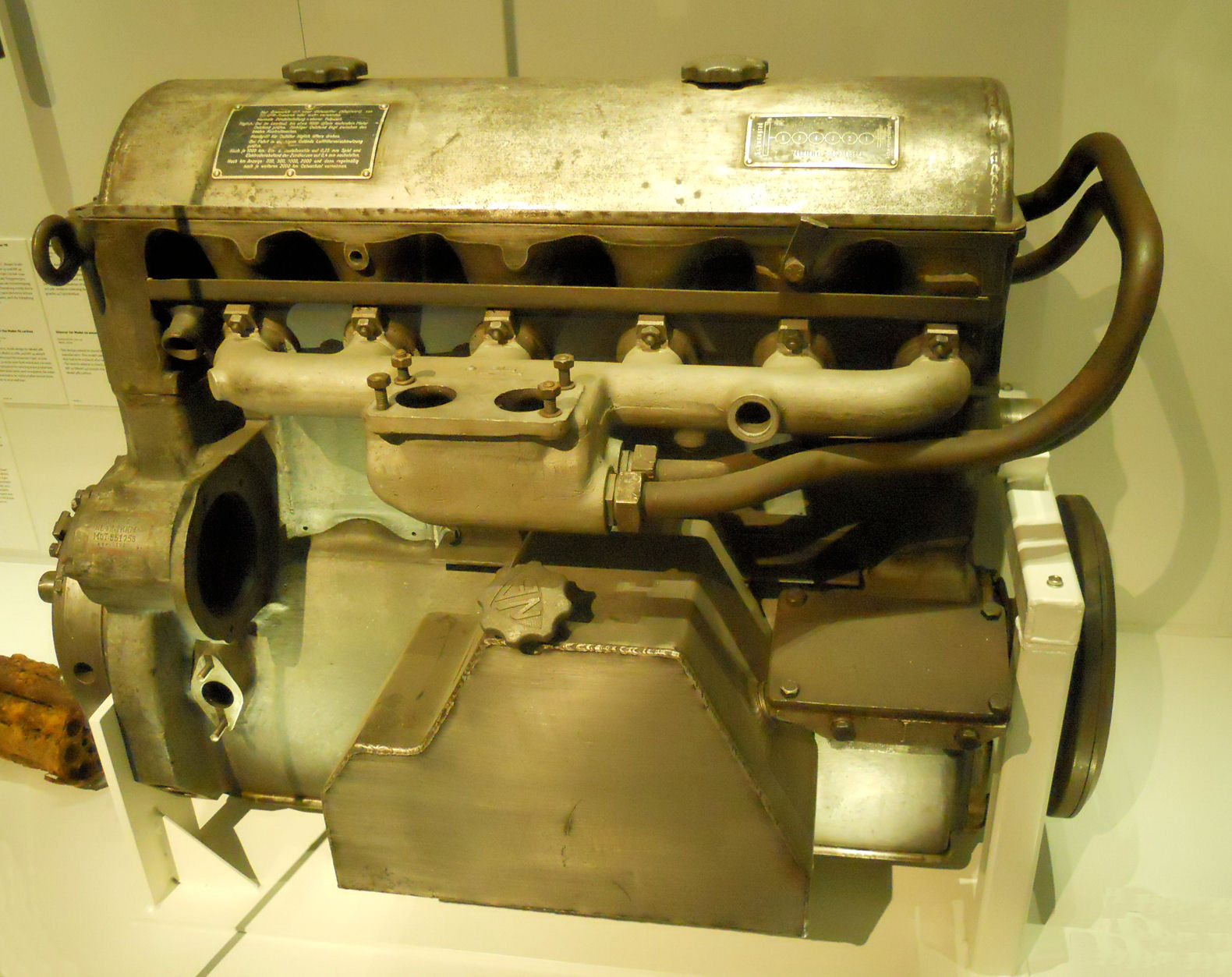
Maybach HL42 TRKM (intake side) with most ancillaries removed. Oil reservoir (TR dry sump) at lower centre; intake manifold and twin vertical holes for carburetter (centre); some of the clutch mechanism (K) partly obscured (far left); the magneto (M), driven off the flywheel, fits in the large hole to the left of the oil reservoir; (Note: The serial number stamped on the magneto housing appears to be MOT 551253) the fuel pump attaches to the two threaded studs directly below.

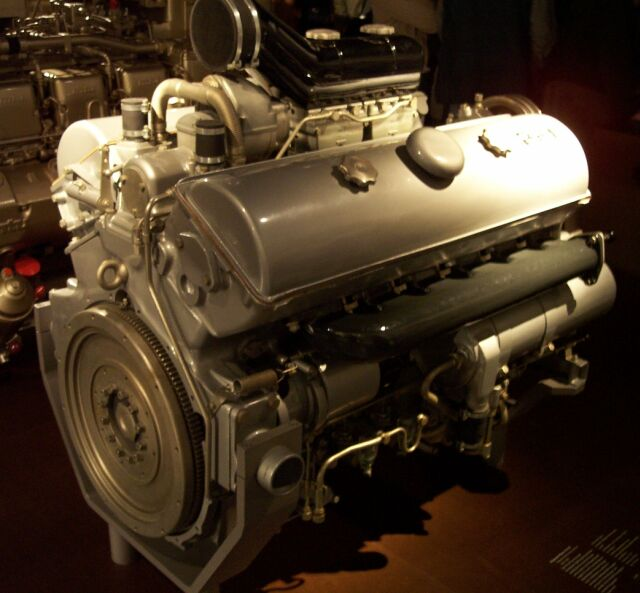
Maybach HL120 (flywheel end). Center top: black air cleaner, above twin Solex carburettors. Top right: the top of the driving pulley for the compressor (partially obscured). Centre: camshaft cover with retaining knobs, above darker gray exhaust manifold. Lower right: Oil cooler. Left lower centre: magneto.

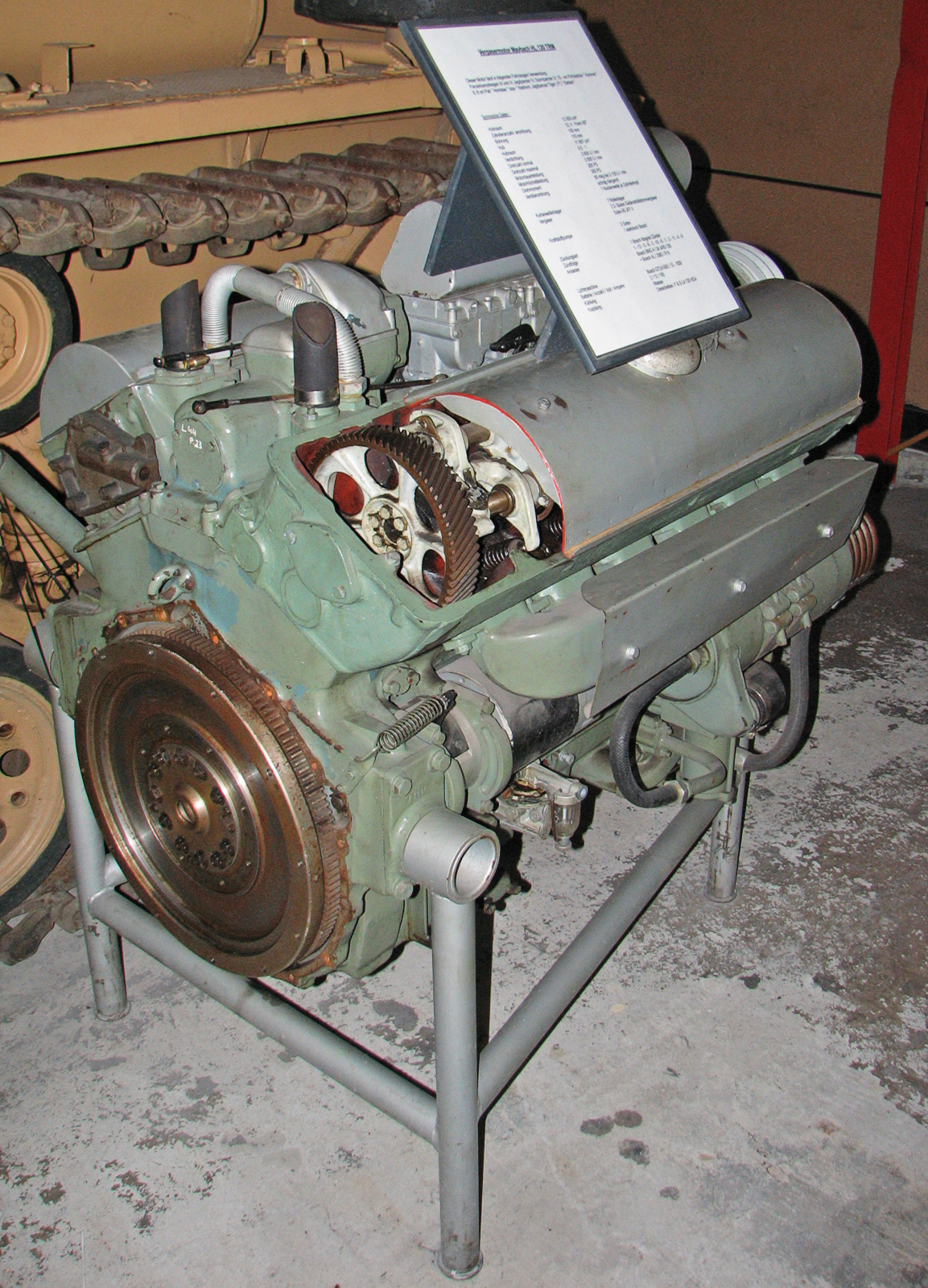
Maybach HL120 TRM with cam cover cut away, showing helical-cut camshaft driving pinion, and twin shafts carrying the rocker arms activated by the central camshaft (hidden). Also, at centre far-right: cylindrical oil cooler (water jacket cut away) with coiled copper oil pipe, and cut-off coolant hose below it.

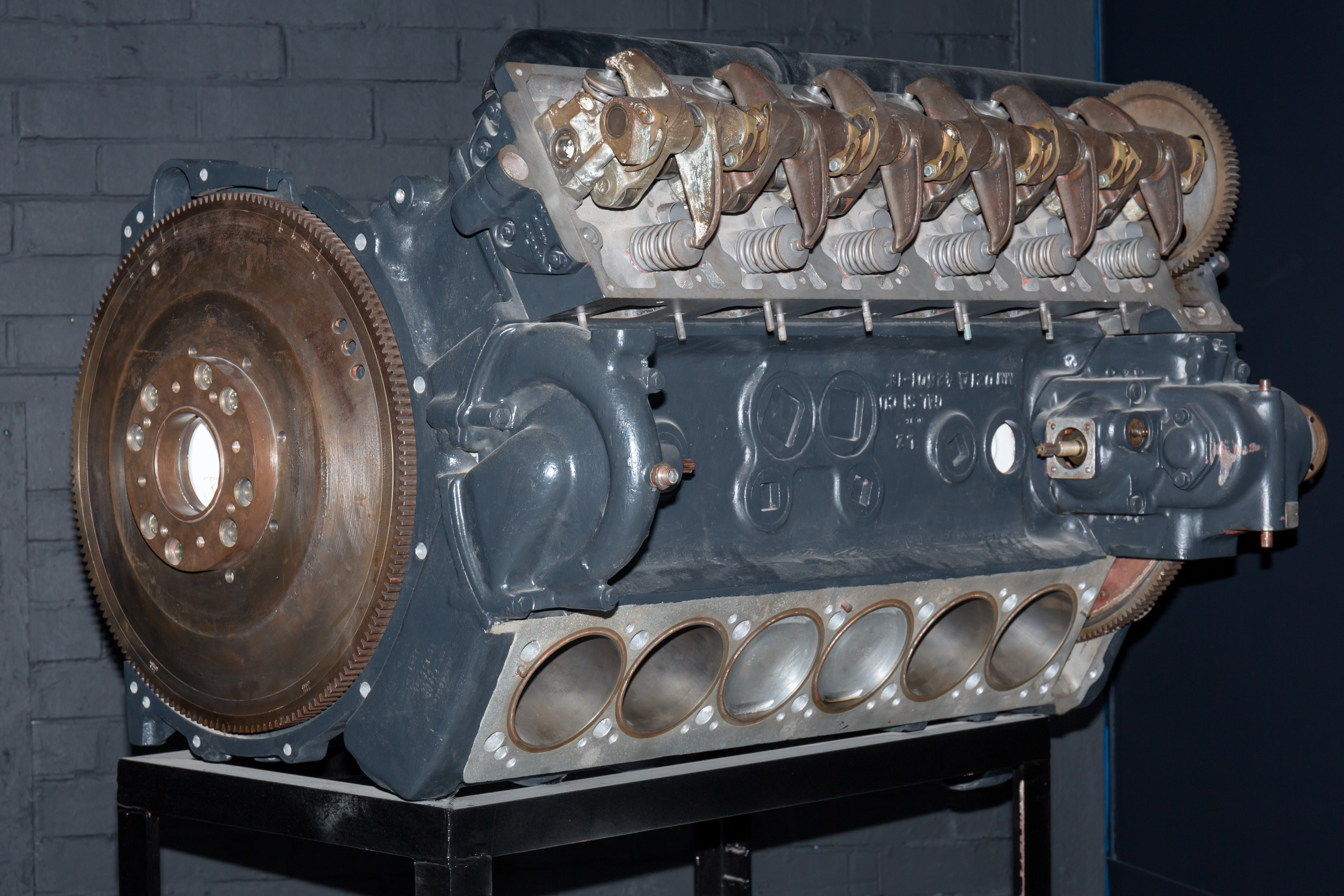
Maybach HL210 P45, originally fitted in Tiger 131. Note the right-angle shape of the cam followers, with rollers bearing on the camshaft lobes (partially visible just above the two leftmost inlet valve springs). The thin slotted brass guides are for setting the tappet clearances. (Note: Note the guide positioning and excessive tappet clearance of the far right inlet valve.) The camshaft drive pinion has straight-cut teeth, which are noisier at high revs, but cheaper to manufacture.

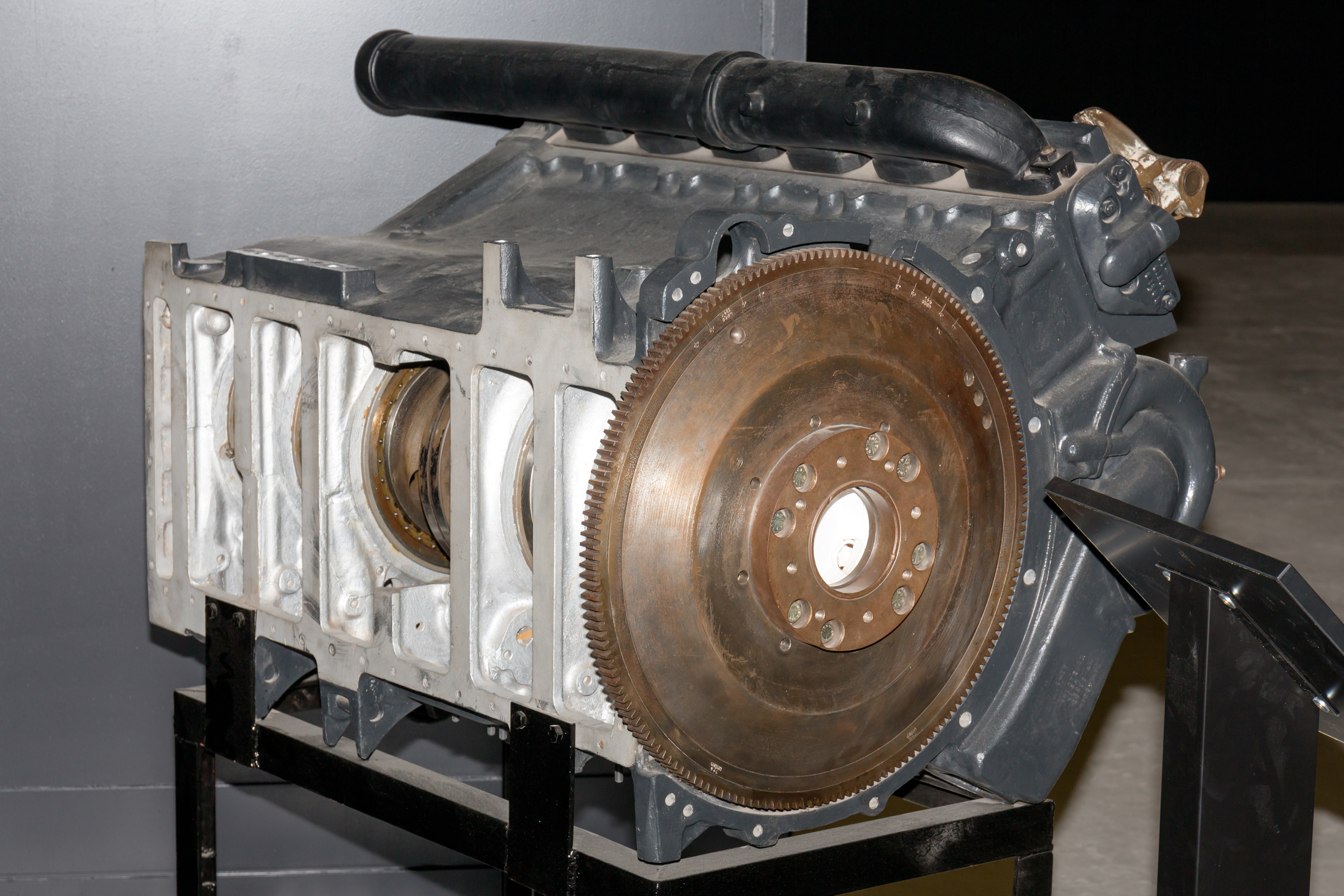
Maybach HL210 P45. The entire engine block is a single aluminium alloy casting from the top of the cylinders to the bottom of the crankcase. Photo shows underside of crankcase, with part of tunnel crankshaft. The large crank webs are supported by outsize bearings which locate into machined housings. (Note: The cast central bearing support was cut away for teaching purposes, exposing the central web and adjacent roller bearing. A clearer photo is here: "Tiger 131 restoration: the final stages?". The Tiger Collection. 20 February 2019.) The flat bottom cover (removed) would be bolted to the underside of the crankcase.

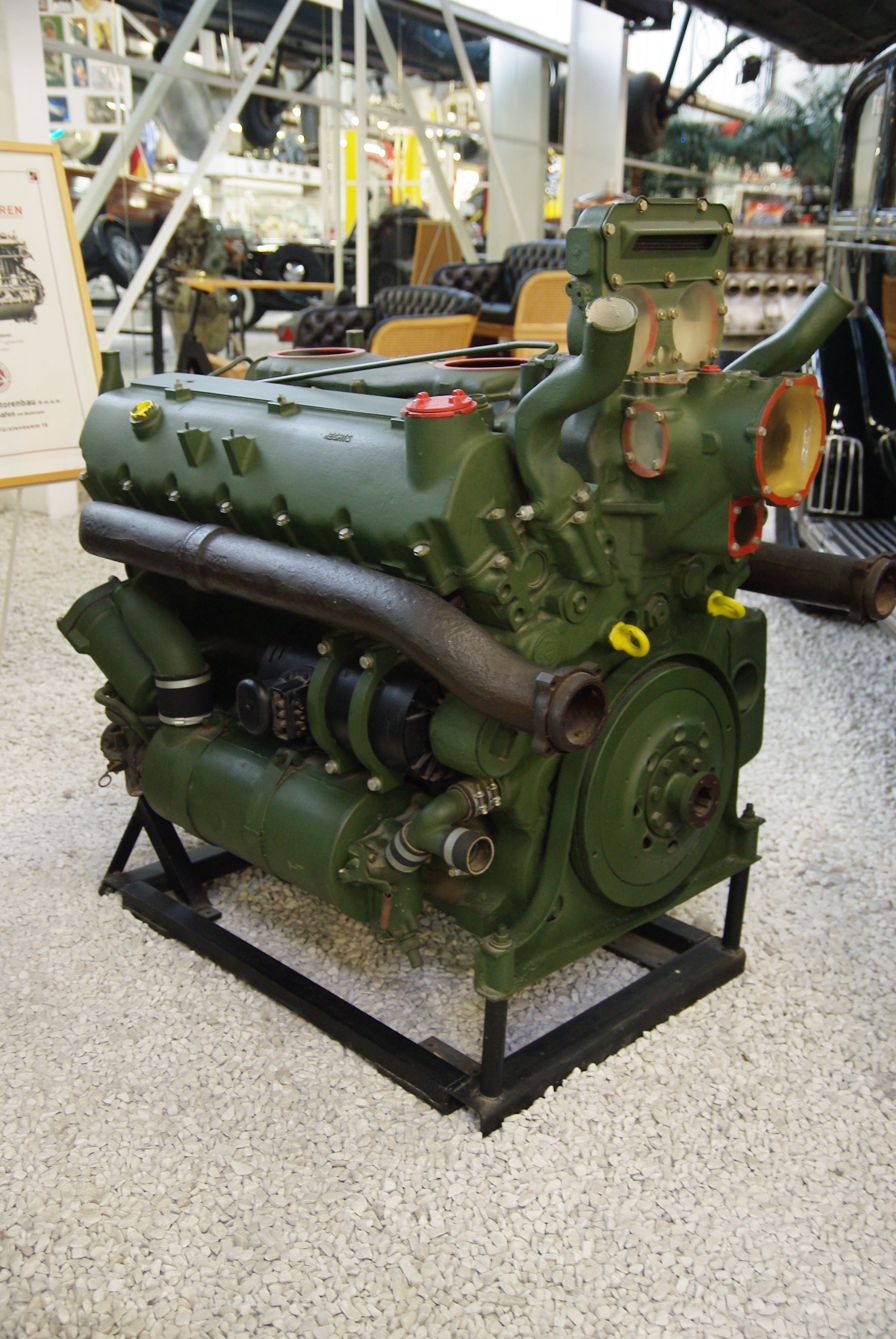
Maybach HL230, oil cooler side. (Note: HL230. From top right: magneto housing, between hot coolant pipes (to radiator). Immediately below magnetos: fan drive housing (yellow interior) with locating hole for fan drive shaft (four bolts). Centre right: cast iron exhausts. Lower right: harmonic damper with splined centre. Far lower right, beneath yellow lifting eye: oil reservoir (partially hidden), with hole for inertia starter handle (hand crank). Centre, below exhaust: dynamo (black). Lower centre: oil cooler, with cold water inlet (from radiator). Far lower left: oil filter (at 45°). Top centre: carburettor cover, with holes for twin air filters)

== Lists of Maybach engines ==
Between 1934 and 1950, Maybach designed approximately 100 different types of HL engines, of which about 70 reached at least bench testing. Some were 'proof of concept' single-cylinder designs. Many of these engines were the direct result of orders for an engine of a specific power and physical size, originating from Waffenamt Prüfwesen 6 ('Weapons Testing [division] 6', Wa. Prüf. 6, responsible for tanks, armoured vehicles and motorized equipment) of the Heereswaffenamt.

Fewer than twenty of these basic designs were actually manufactured as quantity series production engines, and are shown in the first table. Many these engines were manufactured in their thousands by Maybach and its licensed manufacturers.

The second table lists Maybach engines which, although fully functioning, were only made in small quantities and often assigned to projects in the VK series (Versuchskampffahrzeug, "research/experimental fighting vehicle"). Others in the second list were intended for tanks and other AFVs which never even left the drawing board, the so-called 'Paper Panzers' such as the Entwicklung series, from de:Entwicklung, "development").

=== Table 1: Maybach WWII engines which reached series production ===
List of Maybach WWII engines which reached series production
| Model | Type | Capacity (Litres) (Note: Manufacturer's figures were given in litres. Exact engine capacities may vary slightly due to different values of π (Maybach used 355÷113), conversion into US customary units, rounding errors, etc. Details of engines fitted to a small number of prototypes are often vague. To work out engine capacity: Engine capacity in litres = (π/4 * bore^{2} (mm) * stroke (mm) * no. of cylinders) ÷ 1,000,000 eg The Maybach HL85 has a bore and stroke of 95mm x 100mm. Taking π as 355÷113 (Maybach's own value), Engine capacity = (0.78539823 * 9,025 * 100 * 12) ÷ 1,000,000 = 8.505 litres.) | Power (PS) (Note: Manufacturer's values for engine power were originally stated in PS (metric horsepower), which is approximately equivalent to imperial/US horsepower (1 hp = 1.04 PS, 0.7457 kW). Stated figures in various sources can vary even in production engines; and considerably so where later non-series test models (Versuchsmotoren) are concerned.) | @rpm (Note: These are manufacturer's maximum rpm figures. Under normal operating conditions, recommended revs were sometimes a couple of hundred rpm less - e.g. 2,600 rather than 2,800 rpm. HL230s were governed to 2,600 rpm from 1943)§ | Application |
|---|---|---|---|---|---|
| HL25 | I-4 | 2.5 | 65 | 2,800 | Pre-production Sd.Kfz. 10 D4 |
| HL30 | I-4 | 3.0 | 95 | 3,000 | Le.WS - Leichter Wehrmacht Schlepper (Light Army Tractor) (1st & 2nd models) |
| NL35 TUKM | I-6 | 3.435 (Note: bore x stroke 90 x 90mm.) | 90 | 3,000 | Early Sd.Kfz. 6 (Note: The compressor for the air brakes and towed equipment is mounted on top of the cam cover at the clutch end, possibly driven off the camshaft, which also drives the magneto.) |
| NL38 TR | I-6 | 3.817 | 100 | 3,000 | Panzer I Ausf. B and derivatives, e.g. 15 cm sIG 33 (Sf) auf Panzerkampfwagen I Ausf B, Panzerjäger I, Kleiner Befehlswagen (Note: The Panzer I Ausf. A used a Krupp M 305 4-cylinder boxer air-cooled petrol engine of around 57–60 PS @2500 rpm (also used in the Krupp Protze), and a ZF FG 35 gearbox.) |
| NL38 TRKM | I-6 | 3.817 (Note: Frank (Frank 1990, p. 4) gives 3.790 litres. This value is only approximate: Frank appears to have taken π as 3.12, thus with bore x stroke = 90 * 100 mm: 3.12/4 = 0.78, * (8,100 * 100 * 6) / 1,000,000 = 3.790. Taking Maybach's value of π as 355÷113, and bore x stroke of 90 * 100 mm, the correct value is 3.817 litres.) | 100 | 3,000 | Sd.Kfz. 10 D6 (pre-production): early Sd.Kfz. 11 |
| NL38 TUK | I-6 | 3.817 | 100 (Note: Developed 25 mkg of torque @1700 rpm, and 100 PS @ 3000 rpm.) | 3,000 | early Sd.Kfz. 6 (BNL 7 & 8) |
| NL38 TUKR | I-6 | 3.817 | 100 | 2,800 | Sd.Kfz. 11 (early versions) (Note: A 100 hp Maybach engine was experimentally used in early Schnellbooten nos. S2–5 as an auxiliary power source which could operate the central propeller for silent running, but was found not to be needed. Source: Paterson, Lawrence (2015). Schnellboote: A Complete Operational History. Barnsley, Yorkshire: Seaforth Publishing. p. 24. ISBN 978-1-84832-083-3.) |
| HL42 TRKM § | I-6 | 4.170 (Note: (Frank 1990, p. 4). This value is only approximate. Frank appears to have taken π as 3.12, with the result: 3.12/4 = 0.78, * (8,100 * 110 * 6) / 1,000,000 = 4.16988 = 4.170) | 110 (Note: Possibly an error for 100?) | | Sd.Kfz. 10 type D7 (production models): (Note: The Sd.Kfz. 10 chassis had a hull like a tank, (unlike the other half-tracks which had a frame chassis), and therefore used a dry sump (TR) engine because of the engine bay's restricted height.) Sd.Kfz. 11 (later models) |
| HL42 TUKRR | I-6 | 4.198 | 100 | | Sd.Kfz. 251 (various Ausf. types and variants, incl. /16 & /21) |
| HL42 TUKRM | I-6 | 4.198 | 100 | 2,800 | Sd.Kfz. 250: Sd.Kfz. 11, Sd.Kfz. 251 |
| HL42 TRKMS | I-6 | 4.198 (Note: The figure 4.198 litres (taken from the manual) is arrived at by taking π as 355 ÷ 113, and bore * stroke = 90 x 110 mm (from the manual) : capacity = (0.78539823 * 8,100 * 110 * 6) / 1,000,000 = 4.198 litres.) | 100 | 3,000 | Leichter Wehrmachtsschlepper (Le.Ws) (late models) Schwerer Wehrmachtsschlepper (s.Ws) (Note: According to Jentz and Doyle, they were specially designed for the schwerer Wehrmachtsschlepper (s.W.S.), the successor to the Sd.Kfz. 5. The engines were built only by Auto Union.) |
| HL45 P (Note: Maybach produced a total of 254 HL45s in 1940–1943.) | I-6 | 4.678 (Note: Bore * stroke 95 x 100 mm) | 150 | 3,800 | Panzer I Ausf. C (VK 6.01, 40 made, saw action); Ausf. F (VK 18.01, 30 made); and Ausf. J.; (Note: A prototype VK 6.01 with an HL45 P and Maybach Variorex VG 15 3 19 (8+1 gears) was designed to achieve 65 km/h @3,200 rpm. Basic chassis tested for 17 km on an Autobahn in May 1942.) Panzer II n.A. Ausf. G (Sd.Kfz 121/1). (Note: The development and production history of the Ausf. G is somewhat confusing. Although 45 chassis of an initial 0-Serie were completed by MAN by the end of 1942, only nine Aufbauen (superstructures with turrets) were completed before assembly was stopped for Panther production, and only 12 complete tanks were actually produced.) |
| HL45 Z | I-6 | 4.678 | 150 | 3,800 | HKp 602/603 (prototype replacement for Sd.Kfz. 251) |
| HL52 TU (Note: The engines for the early and production models of the Panzer II (La.S.100) and the Sd.Kfz. 7 were developed and manufactured in tandem as TR and TU (dry and wet sump) types: the HL52, HL57 TR, and HL62 TR for the tanks; and the HL52 TU, HL57 TU, and HL62 TU/TUK for the half-tracks. The HL52, HL57 and HL62 TUs in the Sd.Kfz. 7s had no clutch; they were paired with ZF's 'semi-unit' G55 gearbox of two-piece construction. The forward casing held an integral clutch and hi-lo box; this was bolted directly with a gasket to the main 4+1 speed-shift gearbox, contained in the rear half of the casing. The HL62 TUK (with standard clutch, K,) in the m11 was paired with a ZG55 of full unit construction.) (Note: Maybach made a total of 3,083 of all three types from 1936 to 1942: HL57 TR engine numbers from 16101–16280 and HL62 TR numbers starting at 16281. Nordbau made a total of 6311 HL62 series from 1937 to 1942 with engine numbers starting at 510001.) | I-6 | | 120 | | Sd.Kfz. 7 KM m8 production model |
| HL54 TUKRM | I-6 | 5.420 (Note: bore * stroke = 100 x 115 mm.) | 115 (Note: Sawicki & Ledwoch 2007, p. 53 state 84.6 kW (115.0 PS)) | 2,600 | Sd.Kfz. 6 (late models) |
| HL57 TR | I-6 | 5.698 | 130 | 2,600 | Panzer II Ausf. a |
| HL57 TU | I-6 | 5.698 | 130 | 2,600 | Sd.Kfz. 7 KM m9, 2nd batch (Note: Jentz, Doyle & Friedli 2013, pp. 22–4–30, confusingly state an HL57 TU in the text, and an NL57 TU in the table of specifications. The NL appears to be a misprint.) |
| HL62 TR | I-6 | 6.191 | 140 | | Panzer II Ausf. b, c, A–C, F: Wespe |
| HL62 TRM | I-6 | 6.191 | 140 | | Panzer II Ausf. D–E (Note: These variants (with torsion bar suspension) were fitted with the semi-automatic, pre-selector Maybach SRG 14 4 79 gearbox [7+1R gears].) § |
| HL62 TU | I-6 | 6.191 | 140 | 2,600 | Sd.Kfz. 7, 3rd production batch (KM m10) (Note: The HL62 TU engine, like the previous HL52 and 57, had no clutch, and was paired with the semi-unit ZF G55 gearbox with integral clutch (fitted to KM m8, m9 and m10 variants). Milsom claims an HL62 TUK for the m10, but the accurate and detailed drawings by Hilary Doyle clearly show the same arrangement for the engine and gearbox as the m8: no standard engine clutch; the front half of the ZF gearbox casing contains the clutch and hi-lo ratio gearbox: bolted to it is the main speed-shift box, the rear half of the casing. Drawings of m8 chassis:(Jentz, Doyle & Friedli 2013, pp. 22–4–39); m10 chassis: p. 22-4-43; m11 chassis p. 22-4-45.) |
| HL62 TUK (Note: After about 700 engines had been completed, the compression ratio on the HL62 TU and TUK engines was lowered (with a new cylinder head and shorter pistons) after October 1938 to run on OZ 74 gasoline.) | I-6 | 6.191 | 140 | 2,600 | Sd.Kfz. 7 4th batch (KM m11) (Note: This was the only engine with a factory fitted clutch (K) in the four production batches of the Sd.Kfz.7. It was paired with ZF's ZG55 gearbox, which unlike the G55s fitted in the m8, m9 & m10 variants, had no integral clutch.) |
| HL64 TUK (Note: (Jentz, Doyle & Friedli 2013, pp. 22–4–73) state that this engine was fitted to later m 11 models of the Sd.Kfz. 7. Around 2,800 were built by Krauss-Maffei. However, the performance figures they give (140 PS @2,600 rpm are no better than the HL62 TUK in earlier models. Both Milsom 1975, p. 12 and Spielberger 1993, pp. 162–3 state that the HL62 TUK developed 140 PS @2,600 rpm. Neither of them mention the HL64 TUK.) | I-6 | 6.4 (Note: Based on model number) | 140 | 2,600 | Sd.Kfz. 7 (m 11, from mid-1943). (Note: According to John Milsom, the Sd.Kfz. 7 KM m 12 was a projected 1939 variant, similar to the KM m 11 but fitted with a prototype HL80 engine. Neither reached series production.) |
| HL66 P (Note: Maybach made a total of 193 HL66 in 1940–1944) (Note: Photo at Butterworth, Sonny (14 March 2019). "Panzer II Ausf.H & Ausf.M (VK9.03)". The Online Tank Museum. Section "The Great Expectations: Plans for Mass Production".) | I-6 | 6.754 | 180 (Note: 46 mkg of torque @2000 rpm) | 3,200 | Panzer II Ausf. L (Luchs); (Note: 100 Luchs produced - not 131 as sometimes reported.) also fitted in Panzer II n.A. Ausf. H, & Ausf. M (VK 903, test vehicles only, cancelled in March 1942.) (Note: Although Chamberlain & Doyle (1993) state that the HL66 P was fitted in the Panzer II Ausf. G, Jentz & Doyle (2007) only refer to the HL45 P being used in this tank, of which apparently only 12 were produced.) Sd.Kfz. 165/1 |
| SHL66 | I-6 | 6.754 | 125 | 2,200 | Used in Pionierschnellboot (Note: This may be a similar engine to one described as a "6-cylinder Maybach S5 of approx. 7 litres", used to power motor boats used in bridging and rafting operations. See US War Department Technical Manual TM-E 30-451: Handbook on German Military Forces (March 1945), Chapter 8, p. VIII-93. The power output of 80 hp seems to be a misprint for 180.) |
| OS6 | I-6 | 6.995 (Note: Bore x stroke = 94*168 mm, compression ratio=1:5.7. Engine capacity in litres = (π/4 * bore^{2} (mm) * stroke (mm) * no. of cylinders) ÷ 1,000,000. Maybach used π=355÷113. (0.78539823 * 8836 * 168 * 6) ÷ 1,000,000 = 6.995) | 90/95 | 1800/ 1900 | Krauss-Maffei KMS 85/100 (4-wheeled tractor) |
| HL85 TUKRM | V-12 | 8.505 | 185 | 2,500 | Sd.Kfz. 8 |
| HL98 TUK | V-12 | 9.780 (Note: bore * stroke = 95 x 115mm.) | 220 – 250 (Note: Spielberger 1993, p. 165 gives 220 PS @ 2600 rpm, and 250 PS @3000 rpm from later models. Milsom 1975, p. 13 states 230.) | 2,600/ 3000 | Early Sd.Kfz. 9 (FAMO F2 1938) |
| HL108 TR | V-12 | 10.838 (Note: bore * stroke = 100 x 115) | 230 – 250 (Note: Spielberger 1994, p. 21 gives 230 PS @ 2600 rpm, updating an earlier 270 PS @ 3000 rpm in Spielberger 1993, p. 165. Perrett 1980, p. 5 states 250 PS.) | 2,600/ 3,000 | Panzer III Ausf. A through D: Panzer IV Ausf. A (only 35 made) Stug III 0.Serie (pre-production) |
| HL108 TUKRM | V-12 | 10.838 | 250 | 3,000 | Sd.Kfz. 9 (production models) |
| HL120 TR | V-12 | 11.867 | 265 (Note: Spielberger 1994, p. 31 gives 300 PS @3,000 rpm in the Stug III Ausf. A.) | 2,600 | Panzer III, Ausf. E: StuG III Ausf. A (30 made) Panzer IV Ausf. B, early C |
| HL120 TRM (Note: In the Panzer III from Ausf. H onwards, the clutch was flanged to the engine and not to the ZF SSG 77 gearbox. Good pic of an engine swap on a Panzer III with clutch attached at (Jaugitz 1998, p. 7). The clutch may have been fitted during the final assembly stage by the makers of the Panzer III, Daimler-Benz, rather than by Maybach or its licensed manufacturers (see § Maybach history, 1935–1945): an 'HL120 TRMK' seems not to have existed as an official designation.) (Note: An 'HL120 TRM 112' is mentioned by Spielberger 1993c as being installed in the Wirbelwind & Ostwind, and in the Wirbelwind only by Jentz & Doyle (1998), Flakpanzer & Flak Selbstfahrlafetten, Panzer Tracts 12: but Jentz & Doyle 2010a correct this to a standard 'HL120 TRM' in all Flakpanzer IVs including the Möbelwagen and those already mentioned, plus the Kugelblitz of which only a small handful were completed. Thus it seems that the '112' may be some sort of original transcription error or typo (perhaps for V-12?), and a Maybach 'HL120 TRM 112' appears not to have existed.) | V-12 | 11.867 | 272 | 2,800 | Panzer III, Ausf. F–N:StuG III Ausf. B–G: StuG IV: Panzer IV Ausf. later C-J: Elefant/Ferdinand (2 per vehicle): Brummbär (Sturmpanzer IV): Nashorn (Hornisse) Hummel and Panzer III/IV variants; Flakpanzer IV on Ausf J chassis, inc. Möbelwagen, Wirbelwind, Ostwind, Kugelblitz; Landwasserschlepper (Note: Unarmoured, based on Panzer IV chassis, ZF SSG 75 gearbox.) |
| HL210 P45 | V-12 | 21.353 | 650 | 3,000 | first 250 Tiger Is (aluminium alloy cylinder block) |
| HL210 P30 | V-12 | 21.353 | 650 | 3,000? | First 250 Ausf. D Panthers (Note: The HL230 P30 was installed from the 251st Panther Ausf. D during May 1943. This figure of 251 has no connection (as some web sources claim) with chassis number (German: Fahrgestell Nummer) 210254 which MAN didn't produce until September 1943. Four firms made the first Panther Ausf. Ds: MAN, Daimler-Benz, Henschel and MNH (Maschinenfabrik Niedersaschen Hannover). Each firm used a different chassis number sequence, starting 210xxxx to 213xxxx. By the end of April 1943 they had completed 174 tanks between them, and in May a further 194: total = 386 vehicles. Walter Spielberger states that Maybach also built 20 HL210 engines for pre-series Panthers.) (aluminium alloy cylinder block) (Note: The intended HL230 P30 was not ready. (Doyle & Jentz 1997, pp. 5–6).) |
| HL230 P45 | V-12 | 23.095 | 700 (Note: This figure is from Henschel's technical specs, dated 9 February 1944. The P45 and P30 engines were governed to 2,500 rpm from September 1944, limiting it to 600 PS.) | 3,000 (Note: 2,500 rpm from September 1944.) | Later versions of the Tiger I and Sturmtiger (cast iron block) |
| HL230 P30 | V-12 | 23.095 | 600 | 2,600 (Note: The driver's handbook dated September 1944 stated that the engine was governed to maximum of 2,500 rpm.) | Cast iron block. Later Panther Ausf. Ds, all As and Gs Jagdpanther, Tiger II (King Tiger), Jagdtiger : Panther II (prototype) |

=== Table 2: Maybach research/test/experimental engines made in small quantities (under 100) ===
List of Maybach WWII non-series production engines
| Model | Type | Capacity (Litres) (Note: Manufacturer's figures were given in litres. Exact engine capacities may vary slightly due to different values of π (Maybach used 355÷113), conversion into US customary units, rounding errors, etc. Details of engines fitted to a small number of prototypes are often vague. To work out engine capacity: Engine capacity in litres = (π/4 * bore^{2} (mm) * stroke (mm) * no. of cylinders) ÷ 1,000,000 eg The Maybach HL85 has a bore and stroke of 95mm x 100mm. Taking π as 355÷113 (Maybach's own value), Engine capacity = (0.78539823 * 9,025 * 100 * 12) ÷ 1,000,000 = 8.505 litres.) | Power (PS) (Note: Manufacturer's values for engine power were originally stated in PS (metric horsepower), which is approximately equivalent to imperial/US horsepower (1 hp = 1.04 PS, 0.7457 kW). Stated figures in various sources can vary considerably, especially where later non-series test models (Versuchsmotoren) are concerned.) | @rpm (Note: These are manufacturer's maximum rpm figures. Under normal operating conditions, recommended revs were sometimes a couple of hundred rpm less - e.g. 2,600 rather than 2,800 rpm. HL230s were governed to 2,500 rpm from 1943)§ | Application |
|---|---|---|---|---|---|
| HL49 | I-6 | 4.9 (Note: Based on the model number) | 115 | 2,600 | Proposed for Sd.Kfz. 6 type BN 11 V in 1938. Only 3 engines made (Nr. 28001–28003). |
| HL50 P | I-6 | 4.995 | 200 | 4,000 (Note: This would seem to be one of Maybach's high-revving fuel-injected designs which never reached series production.) | Kätzchen APC (prototype) · HKp 603/604 (later prototype replacement for Sd.Kfz. 251) Possibly fitted to a VK 6.02 (late Panzer I Ausf C design) in 1942. |
| HL80 (Note: Prototypes only?) | I-6 | 8.0? | 160? | 2,600 | Sd.Kfz. 7 (KM m 12 - 1939 projected design only) |
| HL90 (Note: For the non-existent HL90/100, see the HL100 entry.) (Note: By around mid-1942 this and the HL100 were intended to power various self-propelled guns based on the Panzer IV chassis, e.g. 10.5 cm leFH 43 (Sd.Kfz. 165/1) or the 10 cm Kanone. Krupp also designed a "leFH 18/1 (sf)Gw IV b (Sd.Kfz. 165/1)" powered by the HL90, but only 8 vehicles were intended to be produced after November 1942. Only 14 engines were ever made.) | V-12 | 9.0 (Note: Approx. capacity based on the model number. Actual bore * stroke = 100 x 106 mm. Source: NF (1 June 2019). "Development of Maybach tank engines in the 1930s-1940s". Альтернативная История. "Introduction" section (in Russian). "The HL 90 engine was developed on the basis of a new concept that was later applied to other HL engines. The tunnel crankcase of this V-shaped 12-cylinder engine was cast from an aluminum alloy. The crankshaft rotated in roller bearings. On the crankshaft connecting rod journals, the connecting rods were located next to each other. The cylinder diameter was 100 mm, the piston stroke was 106 mm. At 4000 rpm, the engine developed 360 hp (265 kW). 14 engines of the HL 90 type were installed on reconnaissance armored vehicles.") | 320/ 350 (Note: Spielberger states 350 and 320 HP on consecutive pages.(Spielberger 1993c, pp. 131–2)) | 3,000 (Note: Jentz & Doyle 1988, pp. 14–32 states 350 PS @4,000 rpm) | Proposed as an intermediate engine for prototype Heuschrecke 10 - 'Grasshopper' SPG while the HL100 became ready. Neither engine reached series production, nor the vehicle. (Note: Only three prototype Heuschrecke vehicles were ever constructed, 1942-3. Details are vague. Photos of engine at "Maybach Motoren: Maybach HL90". Fahrzeuge der Wehrmacht (in German).) (Note: Maybach produced a total of 14 HL90s: 1 in 1941, 5 in 1942, 7 in 1943 and 1 in 1944.) Two HL90 P 20-K engines were used in the sole uncompleted prototype of the Räumer S mine clearer. |
| HL100 | V-12 | 9.99 (Note: Bore x stroke = 100 * 106 mm(Spielberger 1993c, p. 160.) However, although in his text Spielberger lists two different engines proposed for the Heuschrecke (the HL90 and the HL100), in the appendix he conflates the two as "HL90/100"; but gives the specifications for the HL100 only (bore x stroke = 100 x 106mm, 400 PS @4000 rpm.) Five years later in Spielberger 1998, Appendix letter I, Maybach-Motordaten, p. 209 Spielberger restates this HL90/100 without explanation among a long list of Maybach engines, again with same the 9.99 litres and 400 PS @4,000 rpm. An earlier publication, Wespe – Heuschrecke (Waffen-Arsenal No. 66) by Joachim Englemann (1980), p. 47, also lists an HL90/100, although the official technical data sheet on p. 34 states an HL66. This mythical engine appears to have somehow acquired this unlikely model number, whereas it most likely never existed.) | 400 | 4,000 | Proposed for Heuschrecke 10 and the Hetzer. |
| HL116 Z (Note: Maybach produced three HL116 engines in 1940, eleven in 1941, three in 1942 and one in 1943, making 18 in total.) | I-6 (Note: Developed in 1941-2 for the Entwicklung series of new generation tanks, and new halftracks.) | 11.048 (Note: bore * stroke = 125 x 150mm) | 265 (Note: Spielberger contradicts himself on p. 86, saying it developed 300 PS. Milsom 1975, p. 62 states 250 PS.) | 3,300 | Sturer Emil : HK1600/1601/1604 (prototypes) Installed in four VK 30.01 chassis (pre-Tiger I). Also proposed in May 1940 for the cancelled VK 20.01 (K) design project (later became the Panther). (Note: Jentz 1995, p. 11 also names an HL115 as an alternative motor for the VK 20.01 (K), but this is the only mention of such an engine and there seem to be no further details at all.) |
| HL157 P (Note: This engine and the HL174 appear only to have been fitted in a few prototypes, and there seem to be few reliable sources about them.) | V-12 | 15.580 | 550 | 3,500 | VK 16.02 Leopard (prototype). Also proposed for Flakpanzer with 88mm Flak 41 on Panther chassis (unbuilt). |
| HL174 | V-12 | 19.144 (Note: Spielberger 1998, p. 209 states 19.144 litres with bore and stroke 125 * 130 mm. Engine capacity = (0.78539823 * 125^{2} * 130 * 12) ÷ 1,000,00 = 19.144 litres: but this figure is at wildly at odds with the manufacturer's designation, which would normally indicate a capacity of around 17.4 litres.) | 450 | 3,000 | VK 36.01 (H) (Henschel pre-Tiger prototype) (Note: Maybach had only completed two HL174 engines in 1942. Only a single VK 3601 chassis was ever completed.) |
| HL224 | V-12 | 22.4 | 680? (Note: Adjusted estimate) | 3,000 | VK 65.01 (H), (heavy tank prototype by Henschel based on Panzer IV) |
| HL234 (Note: Fuel injection engine, due to be completed by August 1945, but perhaps only one test engine was ever constructed. See "Interrogation of Dr. Stiele von Heydekampf", June 1945, in (Estes 2018, Appendix II, p. 7)) | V-12 | 23.88 | 900 | 3,000 | Intended to replace HL230 P30 in Tiger II; Panther II (proposed at later prototype stage, discontinued); E.50/E.75 tank series, never completed. |
| HL295 | V-12 | 29.5 (Note: from model number) | c.1000 | | Post-war AMX-50 prototype. (Note: One example, captured in Friedrichshafen at the end of the war was tested in a post-war French AMX-50 heavy tank prototype. Weighing 57 tonnes, it failed to live up to expectations, with a road speed of 51 km/h, and only 20 km/h cross-country.) |

== Development of the HL210 and HL230 ==
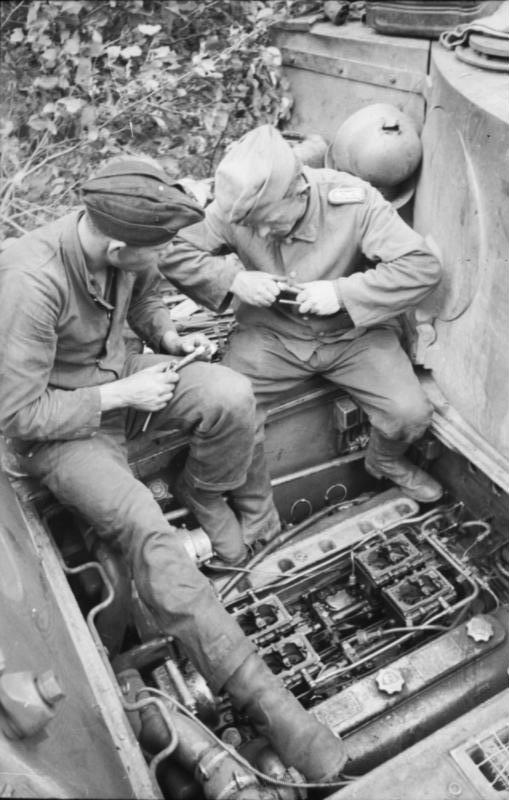
Repairs on a Maybach HL210. Russia, June 1943, during Operation Citadel

A proposed replacement for the Panzer IV had been considered since around 1937. What became the Tiger tank went through a series of specifications, with the final revision (VK 4501) being made in May 1941. Only a month later, the German armies invading Russia encountered the T-34 and KV-1: by December 1941 a specification for a 30-ton medium tank (which became the Panther) had been proposed as an immediate response to the Soviet tank threat. (Note: Although the T-34 and KV tanks were almost impervious to the German 37mm anti-tank guns and the guns of the Panzer III and IVs, they were not the primary reason why the German offensive ground to a halt by the end of 1941. Both sides suffered huge losses of personnel and matériel. The Battle of Smolensk delayed the German push towards Moscow. Despite staggering losses including the Battle of Bryansk, the Red Army (backed up by physical defences constructed by innumerable civilian forces, both women and men, and the implacable weather - the rasputitsa) kept the invading forces at bay for long enough to keep re-located tank production going over the winter.)

Development of the two tanks continued simultaneously: the Tiger prototype was demonstrated to Hitler on his birthday in April 1942, and the first of two Panther prototypes was ready in August 1942.

The weight of the Tiger had increased considerably since its inception, and although it was now considerably heavier than the Panther medium tank, Maybach proposed fitting almost exactly the same 21-litre V-12 650 hp engine in both tanks. To save weight, the cylinder block was cast in aluminium alloy, with cast iron liners. The pistons were made of low-expansion aluminium-silicon alloy with Si content of nearly 20%. The engine for the original 30-ton Panther project was the Maybach HL210 P30, while the 45-ton specification for the Tiger received the HL210 P45. The main visible difference was the arrangement of the coolant ducts exiting the cylinder heads, since the Panther and Tiger had different flows through their radiators. (Note: The HL210 P30 is externally almost identical to the HL210 P45, apart from the hot coolant ducts (to radiator) at the flywheel end. On the P30 they are visually similar mirror images, and each duct is separately piped to the radiators on either side. On the P45 they are of unequal appearance, and are linked over the top of the fan drive housing into a 'Y'-fitting: a single pipe feeds the top of the offside radiator, which is coupled at the bottom to the top of the nearside radiator. The lower outlet of this feeds the oil cooler and then the water pump at the flywheel end. Photos make this much clearer.)

Quantity series production of the PzKpfw VI Tiger (Ausf. H) with the HL210 P45 engine began in August 1942, and it is possible that production of the Panther's HL210 P30 was begun at much the same time. The first battalions to be equipped with the Tigers were the 502nd Heavy Panzer Battalion on the Eastern Front near Leningrad, and the 501st Heavy Panzer Battalion which was sent to Tunisia. Unfortunately, it swiftly became apparent that the Tiger was seriously underpowered, and the rush into production of the new engines meant that the inevitable design defects had not been ironed out. Nevertheless, when the new Tigers arrived in Russia, there was only one spare engine and one transmission for every 10 tanks. A critical lack of spare parts meant that most of them were out of commission within a short period.

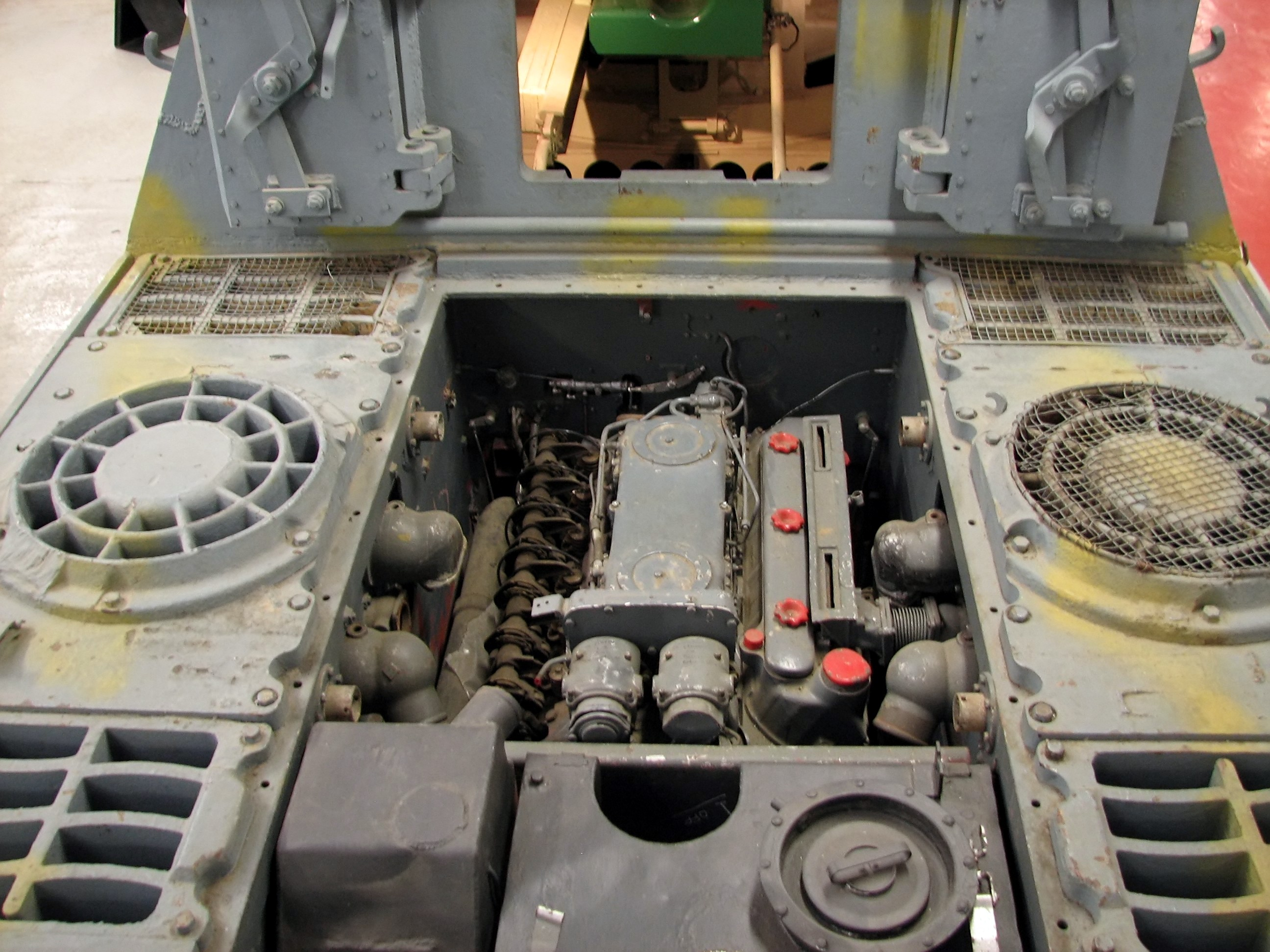
HL230 P30 in a Jagdtiger: note central magnetos and symmetrical rusty coolant connectors just above rear bulkhead. (Note: The four large central grey fittings are ducts to improve air flow in the engine bay.)

The first PzKpfw V Panthers (Ausf. D) were similarly ill-fated; series production began in January 1943, but when they arrived in Russia in the spring the faults (including the steering and leaking engine gaskets) were so egregious that the entire batch had to be returned to Germany. A special plant for rebuilding the Panthers was established near Berlin. A report by Oberstleutnant Reinhold, attached to the 4th Panzer Army during Operation Citadel in July 1943, stated: "Mechanical Deficiencies: The cause for motor failures is still not known. It is possibly traceable to the short run-in time and unskilled drivers. Motors were over-revved. This caused overheating and broken connecting rods. In many cases fuel pumps failed. The pump seals leaked and pump membranes were defective. Leaks in oil line and fuel line connections increased the danger of fire."

Another report from Oberstleutnant Mildebrath for Heinz Guderian, the Generalinspekteur der Panzertruppen in September 1943, about the 96 Panthers of the 2nd Battalion (Abteilung) of the 23rd Panzer Regiment, part of the 23rd Panzer Division:

As before, the troops are still excited about the tactical capabilities of the Panther, but deeply disappointed that the majority of the Panthers can't engage in combat due to a miserable motor and other mechanical weaknesses. They would gladly give up some speed, if automotive reliability could be gained. Until the same automotive reliability as the Panzer III and IV is achieved, the Abteilung must be provided with extra repair parts, especially motors and final drives, and the necessary equipment and personnel to perform maintenance and repairs.

At Kursk, 5–13 July 1943, 25 engines failed within 9 days (these would probably have been HL210 P30s) faults included piston rod bearing damage, broken con rods, damaged pistons, tears (cracks) in the cylinder sleeves, burnt cylinder head gaskets, and water in the exhaust. Also high oil consumption, and spark plugs oiling up. Fuel lines weren't sealed properly, leading to fires in the engine compartment. Final drives were too weak and had a high failure rate. The main clutch was fine except when used for towing, and the gearbox also functioned without problems - it always seems to have worked well, with very few problems ever reported. The running gear also functioned well.

In the meantime, Maybach re-designed the HL210, replacing the alloy cylinder block with a traditional cast-iron one. Although there was no space for a physically larger engine, the cylinders were capable of being bored out without compromising the engine's integrity. The cast-iron HL230 engines weighed around 1,400 kilograms (3,100 lb), considerably more than the 1,050 kilograms (2,310 lb) of the HL210. The new HL230 23-litre engines were installed from May 1943 in the latest production Panthers as the P30, and in Tigers as the P45. (Note: The different cooling duct arrangements were carried over to their respective vehicles, and both designs received central twin magnetos, a new placement of the oil filter, and twin air filters in place of the triple cyclone housings.) Although they produced 700PS @3,000 rpm, from November 1943 they were governed at the factory to 2,500 rpm to increase engine life, which limited them to the same 650 PS as the HL210.

Despite all the changes, the up-engined Panther Ausf. A with the HL230 P30 (which didn't arrive in Russia until late 1943) suffered from over-heating, fires in the engine compartment and blown head gaskets. The head gasket problem was solved in August 1943 by pressing copper rings into grooves to seal the head. A new design of piston was fitted to the HL230 P45 which reduced the compression ratio slightly. In November 1943 a governor was installed in the HL230 P45 which limited the maximum revs to 2,500 rpm, and the maximum speed under full load to 38 km/h (24 mph). Some new and rebuilt motors from October had faulty bearings installed causing frequent failures: improved bearings were installed in new HL230 P45s from January 1944.

As a result of these improvements the Panther became much more reliable. In Nachtrichtenblatt der Panzertruppen ('Newssheet of the Panzer Troops') for March 1944, (Note: NB Here Jentz confuses this newsletter for the troops with Guderian's detailed monthly reports on tank status to Hitler, Notizen des Generalinspekteurs der Panzertruppen. Most of the issues of the Nachtrichtenblatt are available online, sadly excluding No. 9 of March 1944.) Guderian could include the combat report of an unnamed Panther battalion (possibly 1/1st Panzer Regiment) which had travelled an average of 700 kilometers per tank, with only 11 engines needing replacement. And in a situation report to Hitler on late June 1944 on the Battle for Normandy, he comments on the Panther's propensity to catch fire, and the mismatch between the durability of the engine and the transmission: "However, the Panther burns astonishingly quickly. The lifespan of the Panther's engine (1400 to 1500 kilometers) is considerably higher than that of the Panther's final drives. A solution is urgently needed!" Such a solution was never found. A French post-war report The Panther 1947 stated that although the engine could last for up to 1500 km, average 1000 km, the final drives only had a fatigue life of 150 km. The engine could be replaced in 8 hours by a trained mechanic Unteroffizier and 8 men with a tripod beam crane or Bergepanther.

Maybach didn't separate the production statistics of the 210 from the 230. Altogether, production of both types amounted to 153 in 1942, 4,346 in 1943, and 1,785 HL230s up to April 1944. In late April 1944 an Allied bombing raid put the Maybach factory out of action for six months. Production was transferred to the Auto Union factory in Chemnitz, which delivered 219 HL230 engines to Henschel in 1944. A total of 4,366 HL230s from April for Panthers and Tigers were delivered from April 1944 to 1945.

Identifying HL210 and HL230 types

- HL210: three air filters; magnetos are located separately at the end of each camshaft; on the oil cooler side the oil filter sits at a relatively upright angle, approx. 70°.
- HL230: two air filters: magnetos are located centrally in a twin housing between the cylinder heads; oil filter sits at approx. 45°.
- P30: the twin cast iron hot coolant ducts are symmetrical and visually similar, with separate feeds to l.h and r.h. radiators..
- P45: the coolant ducts are siamesed into a single pipe leading to the r.h. radiator.

Despite their similar appearances, the P30 and P45 versions had numerous small differences. The 230 P30 could be swapped with the P45 from a Tiger, but 105 separate parts needed to be removed from the P45 and replaced by 107 parts from the P30.

According to the head of Henschel's design office in 1945, the assembly shop felt that the engine layout of the P30 version of the HL230 had much better attributes and was better developed for assembly work than the HL230 P45 fitted to the Tiger Ausf. E.

== HL234 ==
Maybach continued to develop increasingly powerful 4-stroke water-cooled gasoline-powered engines during the war. One such Versuchsmotor which never reached series production was the HL234, a development of the HL230. (Note: Most of the information about this engine comes from the Report on the Interrogation of Dipl.-Ing. Ernest Kniepkamp (a.F.Vs.) by W. J. Semmons for British Intelligence Objectives Sub-committee (BIOS) c.1946 (Final Report No. 34). Typescript reproduced in Appendix III of Estes 2018, pp. 157–163 §)

The intention was to develop a fuel-injected and supercharged engine, but only the fuel injection mechanism (by Bosch) was working by the end of the war. The engine displaced approximately 23.4 litres, and the un-supercharged version was capable of developing 850 PS @2,800 rpm, with maximum torque of 260 kilogram metres (2,500 N⋅m; 1,900 lb⋅ft) @1,750 rpm (Note: From graph in Spielberger 1993b, p. 175 At the time Germany used the Kilopondmetre abbreviated as mkp or mkg. 1 mkp = 9.80665 N·m = 7.233 lb·ft.), and 900 PS @3,000 rpm Only a few pilot fuel-injection engines were built. The fuel-injected and supercharged version (one engine completed) would hopefully deliver around 1200 PS.

The main supercharger was to have been driven by its own twin-cylinder supercharged 1 litre engine of 70 PS mounted in the V of the HL234 (where the carburetors were located in a normally aspirated engine), but this part of the design was never completed. (Note: This auxiliary engine may have been the HL10, bore * stroke 100mm x 70mm, 1.0996 litres, 70 PS @5000 rpm.) By April 1943 the crankshaft bearings and connecting rods from the HL230 had also been strengthened, and the direct fuel injection system was working - but the supercharger was not yet fully developed. Other improvements over the HL230 included water-cooled spark plugs; an improved intake manifold for better airflow; and improved exhaust manifold as well. Instead of coil-type valve springs the HL 234 used much stronger Belleville washers, which reduced valve opening times. Problems with rubber seals and copper [head] gaskets were solved by adopting designs used in the Rolls-Royce Merlin engine.

The first HL234 Versuchsmotor was planned to be delivered in early 1945 to the Kummersdorf proving ground and was proposed in January 1945 as an upgraded power plant for the Tiger II, but had not yet been tested in a tank by that date. It was also proposed for the Panther II at a later prototype stage, but the project was discontinued. Similarly, the E.50/E.75 tank series for which the engine was also intended were never built before the war's end, with only development of individual components taking place.

Maybach also developed a smaller 12-litre version on similar lines to the HL234. It weighed 600 kg, developing 500 PS without supercharger and 700 PS at 3,800 rpm supercharged, but like so many other German war-time projects, it never came to fruition.

== DSO8 ==
An exception to Maybach's detailed naming system described above is the Maybach DSO8 V-12 engine fitted to early Sd.Kfz. 8s. It was derived from the DS7 (German: Doppel Sechs 7) (i.e. Double-Six, 7 litres) fitted in the Maybach Zeppelin luxury car from 1929, a 7.0 litre (6,971 cc) V12 engine that produced 150 horsepower at 2,800 rpm, and from the later DS8 8-litre (bore x stroke=92*100 mm, 7977 cc, 486 cubic inches) which developed 200 bhp (149 kW; 203 PS) at 3200 rpm. The engine block and pistons were made of light aluminium alloy with cast iron liners. A 1938 Maybach Zeppelin DS8 also fitted with a Maybach Variorex vacuum shift eight-speed gearbox (both the first 8-speed and first 8-speed manual gearbox), sold at auction in 2012 for 1.3 million Euros.

John Milsom mentions two versions of the DSO8, one with a power output of 150 bhp fitted to the prototype DB ZD5 as early as 1931, and one of 200 bhp found in the early production Sd.Kfz. 8 (DB s 7) from 1934 to 1936. A DSO8 developing 155 PS @2600 rpm was also recommended for export models of the Panzer III MKA ("mittlerer Kampfwagen fur Ausland") in August 1937, since the proposed 200 PS Maybach HL76 was "slow to come into production", and may never have reached series production at all.

The DSO8 also powered three Swedish Stridsvagn m/31 prototypes in the early 1930s. A 150 hp DSO8 is also found in the Strv FM/31 Landsverk L-30 dating from 1931, examples of both are preserved in the Arsenalen Försvarsfordonsmuseum in Strängnäs, central Sweden. (Note: A number of photos and drawings can be found here: sp15 (12 March 2014). "Swedish Tanks – Part II: Strv m/31 & Strv fm/31". For The Record.)

== Half-tracks ==
German WWII half-track prime mover numbering may appear not to be strictly logical: the two smallest vehicles were introduced after most of the larger artillery tractors were in production. (Note: They were introduced in the following order: Sd.Kfz. 7 (KM m8 in 1934), Sd.Kfz. 6, 8, 11, 10, 9. (Milsom 1975, pp. 7–8)) In ascending order of engine size and therefore towing capacity, they were designed to tow the following:

- Sd.Kfz. 10 (1-ton), 3.7 cm PaK 36 & 5cm PaK 38, and SP 2cm Flak 30
- Sd.Kfz. 11 (3-ton), 7.5 cm Pak 40 & 41, 10.5 cm leFH 18 and 15 cm sIG 33, 7.5 cm Flak. L/60, standard and Nebelwerfer ammunition trailers
- Sd.Kfz. 6 (5-ton), 10.5 cm leFH 18, 7.5 cm Flak. L/60. Mainly used as engineer/Pioneer equipment and personnel carrier
- Sd.Kfz. 7 (8-ton), 8.8 cm Flak, 10 cm K.18, 15 cm sFH 18, 15 cm Kanone 18 (2 separate loads); SP for 3.7 cm Flak & 2cm Flakvierling
- Sd.Kfz. 8 (12-ton), 10.5 cm FlaK 38, 17 cm Kanone 18 and 21 cm Mörser 18 (2 separate loads)
- Sd.Kfz. 9 (18-ton), 24 cm Kanone 3 (5 separate loads), 35.5 cm Mörser (7 separate loads), 6 or 10-ton crane, or tank recovery

As Maybach designed new, more powerful engines, all these vehicle types received at least two and up to four different engine models during production of the latest batches. There remained the necessity of attempting to produce either spare parts or complete new engines, just to keep the older vehicles running.

== See also ==
- Maybach HL230
- GT 101, BMW-based turboshaft engine project for German AFVs
- Maybach I and II, high command bunkers near Berlin
