= KPM =

KPM may stand for:

- King's Police Medal for Gallantry, British award
- Königliche Porzellan-Manufaktur (Royal Porcelain Factory, Berlin), German porcelain manufacturer
- Koninklijke Paketvaart-Maatschappij (1888-1966), former Dutch East Indies shipping company
- KPM Music, a British stock music company
- Kilopondmetre, kpm, a unit of torque

== See also ==
- KMP (disambiguation)
