= Panther II tank =

German tank design proposal

Panther II
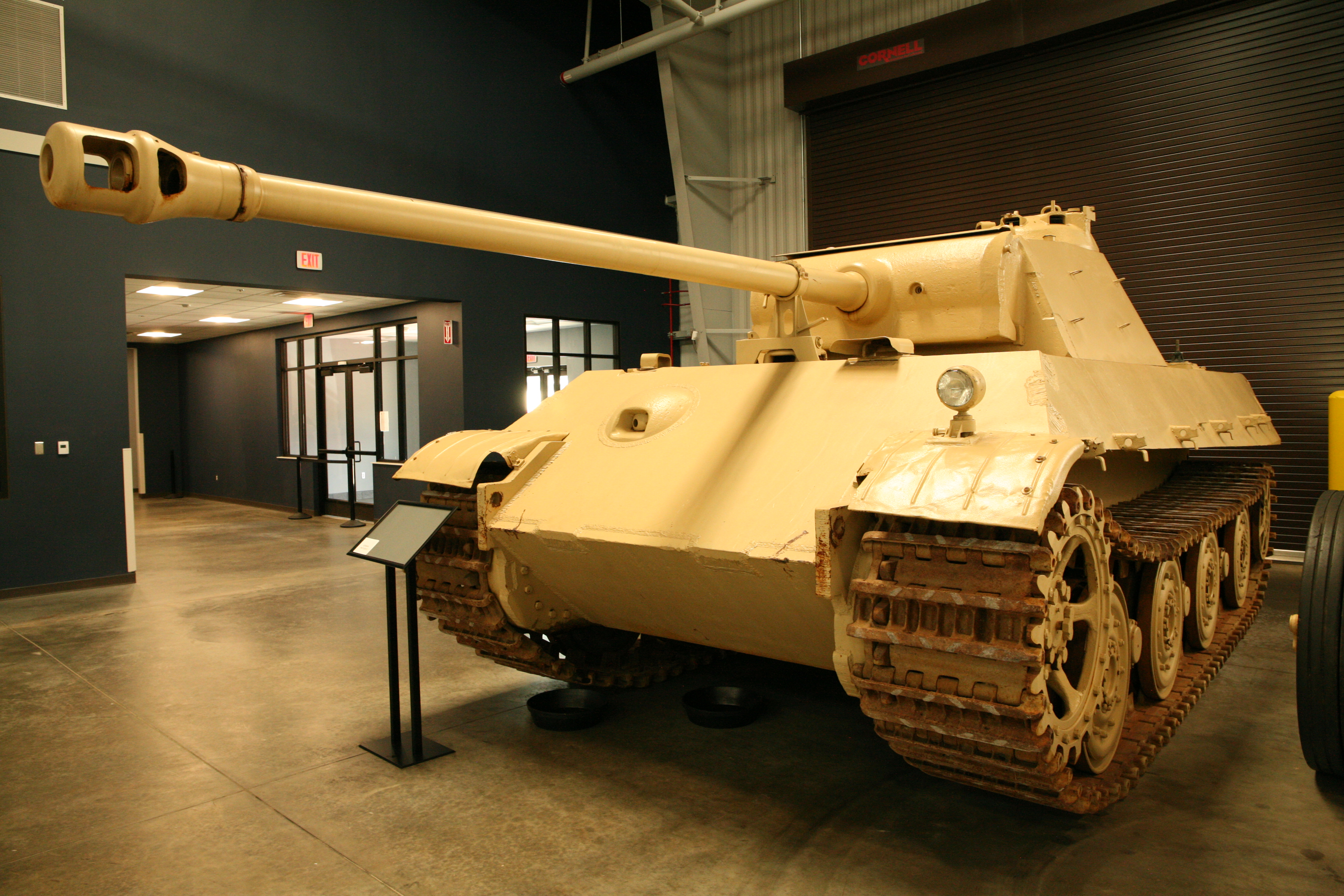
- Panther II at the U.S. Army Armor & Cavalry Collection, Fort Benning. The Panther G turret was installed postwar as a placeholder.

Overview
- Type: Medium tank design proposal
- Production: Prototype stage only
- Designer: Maschinenfabrik Augsburg-Nürnberg

The Panther II is a German tank design of the Second World War based on the design of the original Panther tank. It had slightly thicker armour than the Panther and adopted some standardised components from the Tiger II tank design. (Note: "An unusual one-of-a-kind Panther tank variant generally called the Panther II [...] represents a 1943 German attempt to create a hybrid vehicle that would combine components from early Panther tanks with yet-to-be-built Tiger II heavy tanks.") The Panther II did not progress beyond prototypes and did not enter production.

== Development and production ==
The early motivation for improving the Panther tank came from the concern of Adolf Hitler and others who believed that it lacked sufficient armour. Hitler had already insisted on an increase in its armour once, early in the design of the original Panther in 1942. Discussions involving Hitler in January 1943 called for further increased armour; initially referred to as Panther 2, it was known as the Panther II after April 1943. Following the decision not to commence production, the concepts and ideas were used for the design of the E-50 Standardpanzer project.

=== Armour ===
This upgrade to the Panther tank increased the thickness of the glacis plate from 80 mm (3.1 in) to 100 mm (3.9 in), the side hull armour from 40 mm (1.6 in) to 60 mm (2.4 in), and decreased the armour on the top hull from 40 mm (1.6 in) to 30 mm (1.2 in). Production of the Panther II was slated to begin in September 1943. On 10 February 1943, Dr. Wiebecke (chief design engineer for Maschinenfabrik Augsburg-Nürnberg (M.A.N.) suggested thoroughly redesigning the Panther II and incorporating Tiger II components such as the steering gear, final drives, the suspension system and turret based on Eastern Front experience. The total weight would have increased to more than 50 tonnes. Another meeting on 17 February 1943 focused on sharing and standardising parts between the Tiger II and the Panther II, such as the transmission, all-steel 80-centimetre diameter road-wheels that only overlapped (as on the Tiger II) and not interleaved (as the original 'Schachtellaufwerk' road-wheel system used) and running gear.

=== Turret ===
The Panther II was to be fitted with a new turret, the Turm Panther 2 (German "schmale Blendenausführung" for "narrow aperture variant"). For a long time, it was assumed that the Schmalturm was designed for the Panther II, but it was designed after the Panther II had been cancelled and was intended for the Panther Ausf. F.

=== Engine ===
A number of engines were under consideration, among them the new Maybach HL234 fuel-injection engine (900 hp operated by an 8-speed hydraulic transmission) and the BMW 003 aviation turbojet-derived, GT 101 turboshaft powerplant, planned to be of 1,150 shaft horsepower output and weighing only 450 kg (992 lb) without its transmission, only 38% of the weight of the Panther's standard Maybach HL230 V-12 gasoline fueled piston engine. The engine would have given the Panther II an increased 200 hp, which would have made it faster than its predecessor, though it was heavier. Plans to replace the original Panther design with the Panther II were already underway before the first Panther had even seen combat. But from May to June 1943 a final meeting was held at M.A.N where it was decided that production of the Panther II would cease, and work would focus on the Panther I. It is not clear if there was ever an official cancellation – this may have been because the Panther II upgrade pathway was originally started at Hitler's insistence.

=== Crew ===
The Panther II required five crew members to operate, its turret accommodated three crew members, the commander, gunner, and loader whilst the driver and radio operator sat in the hull, in an arrangement identical to the Panther I.

== Surviving vehicles ==
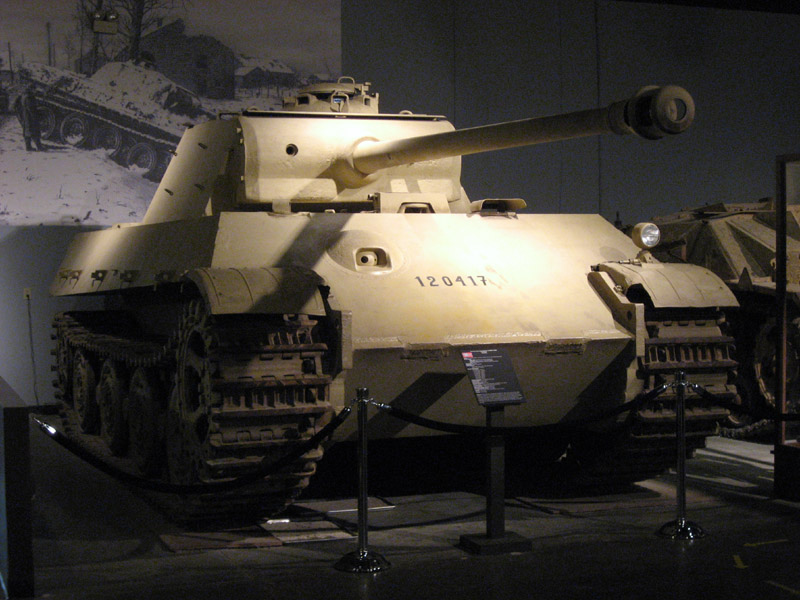
Panther II on display at Patton Museum of Cavalry and Armor, Fort Knox. The Panther G turret on display was not originally fitted to this hull but was installed later as a placeholder.

One prototype hull was completed and captured by US forces. It was taken to Aberdeen Proving Ground, and then later moved to the Patton museum. A Panther Ausf. G turret was placed on the Panther II hull as a placeholder. The Panther II hull was moved to the National Armor and Cavalry Museum at Ft. Benning, GA for display.
