= Engine power =

Power output of an engine

- Common symbols: P
- SI unit: Kilowatt (kW)
- In SI base units: 1000 kg⋅m^{2}⋅s^{−3}
- Derivations from other quantities: P = M·ω
- Dimension: $ML^2T^{-3}$

Engine power is the power that an engine can develop. It can be expressed in power units, most commonly kilowatt, metric horsepower (often abbreviated PS), or horsepower. In terms of internal combustion engines, the engine power usually describes the rated power, which is a power output that the engine can maintain over a long period of time according to a certain testing method, for example ISO 1585. In general though, an internal combustion engine has a power take-off shaft (the crankshaft), therefore, the rule for shaft power applies to internal combustion engines: Engine power is the product of the engine torque and the crankshaft's angular velocity.

== Definition ==
Power is the product of torque and angular velocity:

Let:

- $P=$ Power in Watt (W)
- $M=$ Torque in Newton-metre (N·m)
- $n=$ Crankshaft speed per Second (s^{−1})
- $\omega=$ Angular velocity = $2\pi n$

Power is then:

$$P= M \cdot \omega$$

In internal combustion engines, the crankshaft speed $n$ is a more common figure than $\omega$, so we can use $2 \pi n$ instead, which is equivalent to $\omega$:

$$P= M \cdot 2 \pi \cdot n$$

Note that $n$ is per Second (s^{−1}). If we want to use the common per Minute (min^{−1}) instead, we have to divide $n$ by 60:

$$P= M \cdot 2 \pi \cdot {n \over 60}$$

== Usage ==
=== Numerical value equations ===
The approximate numerical value equations for engine power from torque and crankshaft speed are:

==== International unit system (SI) ====
Let:

- $P=$ Power in Kilowatt (kW)
- $M=$ Torque in Newton-metre (N·m)
- $n=$ Crankshaft speed per Minute (min^{−1})

Then:

$$P= {M \cdot n \over 9550}$$

==== Technical unit system (MKS) ====
- $P=$ Power in Metric horsepower (hp, PS)
- $M=$ Torque in Kilopondmetre (kp·m)
- $n=$ Crankshaft speed per Minute (min^{−1})

Then:

$$P= {M \cdot n \over 716}$$

==== Imperial/U.S. Customary unit system ====
- $P=$ Power in Horsepower (hp, bhp)
- $M=$ Torque in Pound-force foot (lbf·ft)
- $n=$ Crankshaft speed in Revolutions per Minute (rpm)

Then:

$$P= {M \cdot n \over 5252}$$

=== Example ===
Torque and power diagram of the example diesel engine
The power curve (orange) can be derived from the torque curve (blue) by multiplying with the crankshaft speed and dividing by 9550.
View source data.

A diesel engine produces a torque $M$ of 234 N·m at $n$ 4200 min^{−1}, which is the engine's rated speed.

Let:

- $M= 234 \, N \cdot m$
- $n= 4200 \, {min}^{-1} = 70 \, s^{-1}$

Then:

$$234 \, N \cdot m \cdot 2 \pi \cdot 70 \, s^{-1} = 102,919 \, N \cdot m \cdot s^{-1} \approx 103 \, kW$$

or using the numerical value equation:

$${234 \cdot 4200 \over 9550} = 102.91 \approx 103$$

The engine's rated power output is 103 kW.

== Units ==
	Kilowatt	Kilopondmetre per Second	Metric horsepower	Horsepower	Pound-force foot per minute
1 kW (= 1000 kg·m^{2}·s^{−3}) =	1	101.97	1.36	1.34	44,118
1 kp·m·s^{−1} =	0.00980665	1	0.013̅	0.0132	433.981
1 PS =	0.73549875	75	1	0.986	32,548.56
1 hp =	0.7457	76.04	1.014	1	33,000
1 lbf·ft·min^{−1} =	2.26·10^{−5}	0.0023	2.99·10^{−5}	3.03·10^{−5}	1

== See also ==
- List of production cars by power output

== Bibliography ==
- Böge, Wolfgang (2017), Alfred Böge (ed.), Handbuch Maschinenbau (in German), Wiesbaden: Springer, ISBN 978-3-658-12528-8
- Böge, Alfred (1972), Mechanik und Festigkeitslehre (in German), Wiesbaden: Vieweg, ISBN 9783528140106
- Kemp, Albert W. (1998), Industrial Mechanics, American Technical Publishers, ISBN 9780826936905
- Fred Schäfer, Richard van Basshuysen, ed. (2017), Handbuch Verbrennungsmotor (in German), Wiesbaden: Springer, ISBN 978-3-658-10901-1
