= Škoda T-15 =

Czechoslovak light tank prototype

- Type: Light tank
- Place of origin: Czechoslovakia

Production history
- Designer: Skoda
- No. built: 5 (prototype)

Specifications
- Mass: 11-13 tons
- Crew: 4 (commander/gunner, driver, loader and radio operator)
- Armor: 12–30mm
- Main armament: 1 × 3.7 cm KwK 38(t) L/47
- Secondary armament: 1 × 7.92 mm MG 34 machine gun
- Engine: Praga NRi; 274 hp (204 kW)
- Power/weight: 26.94
- Suspension: torsion bar
- Maximum speed: 60 km/h

The Škoda T-15 was an experimental German-Czechoslovak light tank developed by Škoda Works for the German armed forces from 1941 to 1943. The T-15 never entered mass production or combat, and only no more than five prototypes – including two in mild steel – were built.

The T-15 weighed 11–13 tonnes, and was armed with a 37mm gun and MG 34 machine gun.

== History ==
Designed by the company Škoda starting in 1940, it weighed between 11-13 tons and had a maximum speed of 50-60 km/h. By 1942 the German government had lost interest in the development of the tank, but the company still continued development in-house. Only four prototypes were made, and the T 15 never saw battle or entered active service. Note that it was supposed to be very modestly armored and armed like most light tanks, with a 5 cm KwK 39 L/60 gun and MG34 and 30mm armor at its weakest point.

Interest in the development of the tank declined in 1942 as the Panzer II Ausf. L "Luchs" was more advanced, however Skoda continued the development project.

In total, Škoda-Werke has assembled four prototypes. However, the German army abandoned the construction of the fifth tank at the beginning of 1944, since by that time the more advanced Luchs was already in mass production. As a result, the tanks were simply dismantled, and the projects of their variants T-15A, T-15B, T-15S and T-16 were stopped.
