= Panzer III/IV =

Experimental German WWII medium tank

Panzerkampfwagen III/IV
- Place of origin: Nazi Germany

Service history
- In service: Never produced

The Panzerkampfwagen III/IV (PzKpfw III/IV) was an experimental medium tank project undertaken by Germany during World War II. The tank was designed to use components of both the Panzer III and Panzer IV, in an attempt to integrate the two projects. The project was cancelled with only the blueprints developed, and no units were ever built.

== Development ==
Due to the technical construction of the Panzer III and Panzer IV having strong similarities, design meetings were held in September 1941 to create a new unified tank chassis based on those two tanks. Encouraging this plan were developments both tanks had undergone during their production runs, which made the two tanks even more unified than their initial designs had intended. It was anticipated that this would result in overall cost reductions in production, supply, training and maintenance. In a notable deviation from either the Panzer III or Panzer IV, this design for the Panzer III/IV concept used schachtellaufwerk (overlapping road wheels) suspension. This design settled on use of the Panzer III turret, but with a hydraulic powered traverse system instead of the existing manual traverse.

The Panzer III/IV was to have 50 mm (2.0 in) of protection all-around. The designers were concerned about the 23.5 ton weight limitation set for the project and suggested reducing the rear armor and parts of the side armor covered by the running gear to 40mm. However a brief from 14 September 1941 sent to the designers from the German Armament Staff stated that it was acceptable to exceed the weight limit due to the assumption that Hitler would in any case request greater armor protection for the vehicle before the design would be approved for production. Prototypes for this design of the Panzer III/IV, using the Panzer III turret and schachtellaufwerk suspension, would be produced. However, by 1942 it was evident that the Panzer III turret (in conjunction with the Panzer III/IV's hull design and suspension) would not be sufficient to mount the powerful new tank guns being developed. The design team abandoned this version of Panzer III/IV, continued development of the concept with updated designs.

On 4 January 1944, the Panzerkomission finally approved an updated Panzer III/IV design. This new design had an armor layout that focused on frontal protection through a hull front incorporating aggressively sloped armor. The lower front of the hull was two 60 mm thick armor plates (sloped at 60 degrees from vertical on the upper plate, and 45 degrees on the lower plate). The upper front of the hull was a single 80 mm thick plate set somewhat further back and sloped at 50 degrees from vertical. The sides of the superstructure were 30 mm thick on this design (the same thickness as that of the Panzer IV) but angled at 36 degrees from vertical increasing its effective thickness. This degree of armor sloping was not present on either the Panzer III or Panzer IV but did appear on other late-war German tank designs such as the Panther tank.

The Maybach HL120 TRM engine (in use on both the Panzer III and Panzer IV by 1944) was selected for this new project, and was connected to the SSG-77 transmission (also in use on both predecessor tanks by 1944). Further adoptions from the Panzer III include the steering gear and reinforced output shafts, final drives, and driving wheels. The engine cooling system from the Panzer IV was to be used by the Panzer III/IV. A novel track design was created for the Panzer III/IV: 540 mm wide symmetrical tracks with a central ridge, using cast and formed links (akin to those on the Tiger II). These tracks would be significantly wider than the standard tracks for the Panzer III and Panzer IV, but slightly shorter than the asymmetrical "ostketten" soft terrain tracks used on those tanks. The suspension was a new design: six 660 mm diameter semi-detached road wheels each side, mounted in pairs on double-bogies using leaf spring suspension. While these road wheels were larger than those of the production Panzer III or Panzer IV, the Panzer IV used a similar double-bogie leaf spring suspension design. The planned turret was a modified variant of the Panzer IV Ausf. J turret which used a flexible electrical cable to provide power to the turret, instead of the original variant which used rotary electrical contacts at the base of the turret basket. As a result the turret traverse was limited to 270 left and right longitudinally.

In June 1944 the decision was made to begin full series production of the Panzer III/IV. Production of the vehicle was planned to commence in February 1945 at Krupp-Grusonverk, however on 12 July 1944, the Panzer III/IV project was cancelled because the vehicle did not meet the new requirements for armament capability and armor protection as a result of Soviet tanks encountered on the Eastern Front. The hull from the Panzer III/IV, also known as the Einheitsfahrgestell ("standard chassis") hull, would remain officially adopted as the basis of the unproduced Jagdpanzer IV/70(E), until the end of the war in 1945.

== Tanks of comparable role, performance and era ==
- Medium Tank M7
