= Luchs (tank) =

German light tank of WW2

Panzerkampfwagen II Ausf. L "Luchs" Panzerspähwagen II/Sd.Kfz. 123/VK 13.03
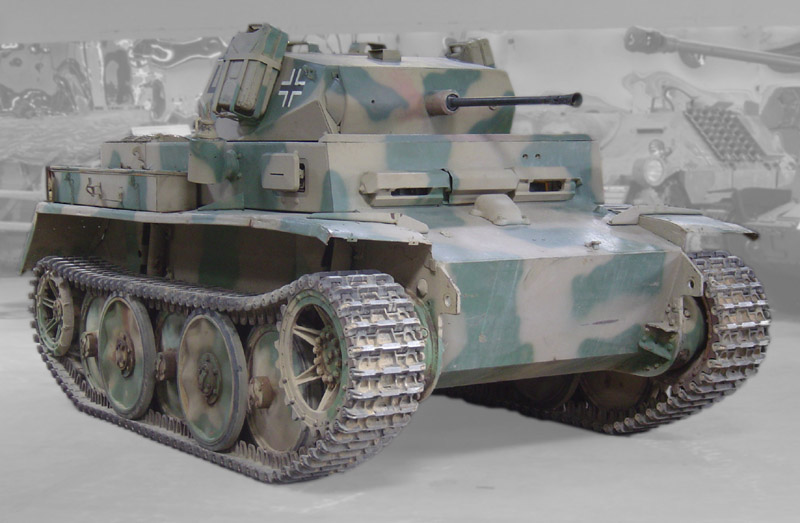
- The Luchs at Musée des Blindés tank museum.
- Type: Light tank
- Place of origin: Germany

Service history
- In service: 1942–1945
- Wars: World War II

Production history
- Designer: Daimler-Benz and MAN
- Designed: 1939–1942
- Manufacturer: Daimler-Benz and MAN
- Produced: September 1942 – January 1944
- No. built: 100
- Variants: See Variants

Specifications
- Mass: 11.8 t (11.6 long tons)
- Length: 4.63 m (15 ft 2 in)
- Width: 2.48 m (8 ft 2 in)
- Height: 2.21 m (7 ft 3 in)
- Crew: 4 (commander/loader, driver, gunner, and radio operator)
- Armor: See Armor layout section
- Main armament: 1 × 2 cm KwK 38 L/65
- Secondary armament: 1 × 7.92 mm MG 34 machine gun
- Engine: Maybach HL 66P 6-cylinder petrol 180 metric horsepower (178 hp)
- Transmission: Aphon SSG48 (6-1)
- Suspension: torsion bar
- Fuel capacity: 235 L
- Operational range: 260 km (on road)
- Maximum speed: 60 km/h

The Panzerkampfwagen II Ausf. L "Luchs" (German for lynx) is a German light tank from the Second World War, developed between 1940 and 1942 by Daimler-Benz and MAN. The Luchs was the only Panzer II design with the Schachtellaufwerk overlapping/interleaved road wheels and "slack track" configuration to enter series production, with 100 being built from September 1942 to January 1944 in addition to the conversion of the four Ausf. M tanks. Originally given the experimental designation VK 13.03, it was adopted under the alternate name Panzerspähwagen II and given the popular name Luchs. The Luchs was larger than the Panzer II Ausf. G in most dimensions. With a six speed transmission (plus reverse), it could reach a speed of 60 km/h (37 mph) with a range of 260 km (160 mi).

The FuG 12 and FuG Spr radios were installed, while 330 rounds of 20 millimetres (0.79 in) and 2,250 rounds of 7.92 millimetres (0.312 in) ammunition were carried.

== History ==
In the summer of 1938, German manufacturing firms Daimler-Benz and MAN began developing a new reconnaissance tank under the VK 9.01 index. This tank was positioned as a development of Panzer II, but in fact it was a brand new machine. The chassis with the overlapping wheel arrangement of the support links consisted of five links on both sides. The tank was powered by a 150 hp Maybach HL 45 engine that allowed the 10.5-ton tank to reach a top speed of 50 km/h. In 1939, a prototype was produced, and after testing it was adopted under the name Panzerkampfwagen II Ausf. G. From April 1941 to February 1942, 12 machines were manufactured, after which production was halted.

On April 15, 1939, Daimler-Benz and MAN were ordered to design a 13-ton reconnaissance tank designated VK 13.01. The design of the tank was based on the VK 9.01. The main difference was the turret of the VK 13.01 fits two people on turret. However, in July 1940, the Waffenamt connected the Czech firms Škoda and Böhmisch-Mährische Maschinenfabrik (BMM) to the program of the creation of a 13-ton reconnaissance tank. In July 1941, MAN manufactured the tank chassis. At the end of January 1942, testing of prototypes began at the Kummersdorf test site. The Škoda company developed a T-15 light tank based on LT vz.35, and BMM, with their Panzer 38(t) n.A., developed on the basis of Panzer 38(t). As a result of the first stage of the tests, the BMM project won. However, in the second phase of the trials, which took place between May and June 1942, the MAN project won. The tank was adopted by the Wehrmacht under the name Panzerkampfwagen II Ausf. L.

== Design ==
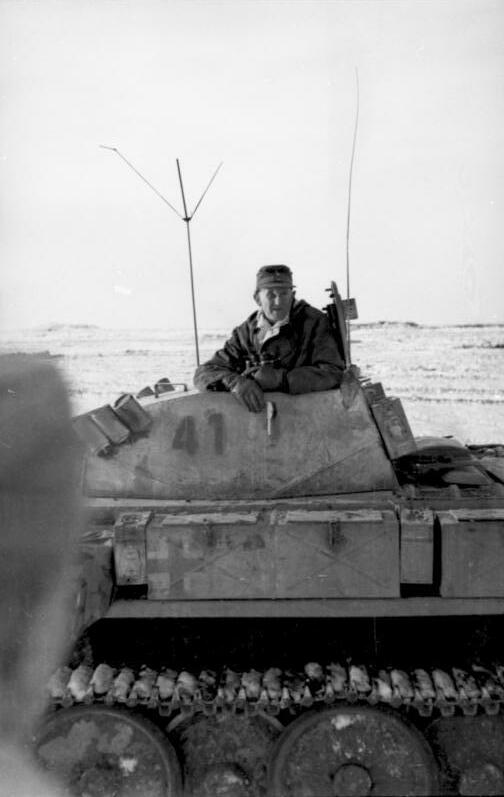
Luchs commander; Nebelwurfgerät 39 smoke generators on the side of the turret.

=== Hull and turret ===
The box-shaped welded hull was divided into three compartments (control, combat and engine). In the front of the hull there was a mechanic-driver and a radio operator. The front armor was 30mm of steel. The sides of the hull was 20 mm, the rear was also 20 mm. The roof and bottom of the hull had only 10 mm of armor. The tank's weight was 11.8 tons.

=== Armor layout ===
The Luchs has 30 mm of armor at the front (sloped between 10 and 25°), 20 mm on the sides and rear, 13 mm on the top, and 10 mm on the bottom of the tank.

In some tank divisions, the frontal armor of the tank was reinforced with additional 20 mm armor plates. A similar reinforcement was carried out in the 4th reconnaissance battalion of the 4th Panzer Division.

=== Armament ===
The armament was one 2 cm KwK 38 autocannon (with the longer L/65 Flakbarrel) and one 7.92mm MG 34 machine gun. On board were 320 rounds of 20 mm ammunition and 2,250 rounds of machine gun ammunition. To launch smoke grenades on the sides of the turret were installed three Nebelwurfgerät 39 smoke generators with a caliber of 90 mm. Even during the design phase, it was clear that the 20 mm gun would significantly limit the capabilities of the tank, so in April 1943 it was decided to start production of tanks with a 5 cm KwK 39 L/60, but the new gun did not fit in the tank turret. To solve this problem, it was decided to develop a new turret which could take the 5 cm gun on it; however, mass production of 5 cm-armed tanks was never started.

Armor penetration of 2 cm KwK 38 L/55
| Cartridge | Type | Weight | Velocity | Angle | 100 m | 500 m | 1000 m |
|---|---|---|---|---|---|---|---|
| Panzergranate | Armor-piercing | 148g | 780 m/s | 30° | 20mm | 14mm | 9mm |
| Panzergranate 40 | Sub-caliber | 100g | 1050 m/s | 30° | 40mm | 20mm | - |

=== Crew ===
The tank accommodated four crew members, the commander (gunner), driver, loader and the radio operator.

=== Engine and transmission ===
The tank was fitted with a Maybach HL 66P six-cylinder four-stroke in-line liquid cooling engine with a power of 180 hp. The engine starter is the Bosch GTLN 600/12-12000 A-4. A manual launch was also possible. The fuel is ethylated petrol with an octane number 76 was placed in two tanks with a total capacity of 235 liters. The carburetor used in this vehicle was the Solex 40 JFF II. (One Luchs production tank was equipped with a 12-cylinder V-shaped Tatra 103 diesel with power output of 220 hp).

The transmission consisted of a two-disc main dry friction clutch of the Fichtel and Sachs Mecano type, a mechanical synchronized transmission of the Aphon SSG48 (6–1), a gimbal shaft and MAN-type pad brakes.

=== Running gear ===
For each side, the Luchs' chassis consisted of five cropped support links, with a wheel diameter of 735 mm, located in two rows. It uses Schachtellaufwerk overlapping/interleaved road wheels and "slack track" configuration. Torsion bar is the primary suspension for the Luchs.

== Production ==
Maschinenfabrik Augsburg-Nürnberg's original order consisted of 800 tanks, of which 700 were to be produced as Luchs 5 cm. Serial production began in September 1943 and continued until February 1944.

Only 100 Panzer II “Luchs” were produced in total, all manufactured by MAN. A total of only 100 (2 cm) vehicles were produced (serial No. 200101–200200) but not a single tank with a 50 mm gun was produced. The MAN company was not able to fulfill the order completely as it was producing the Panther tank.

== Combat history ==
The Luchs were to enter service with armoured reconnaissance detachments (Panzer-Aufklarung-Abteilung) which were made up of four platoons of seven Luchs and one in the company HQ. There were also four Sd.Kfz. 250/1 light half-track armoured personnel carriers, one Sd.Kfz. 9 heavy half-track and seven Sd.Kfz.2 Kettenkrad half-track motorcycles. The Luchs' troops began to enter in the autumn of 1942. The first new tanks were received by the 2nd Company of the 4th Reconnaissance Battalion ( 2.Kompanie/Pz.Afkl.Abt.4) of the 4th Panzer Division. On September 26, 1943, the company was disbanded, and the remaining tanks were sent to the factory for repairs. Not all tanks returned from it; some were left off. Later, the company was re-created as the 1st Company of the 9th Reconnaissance Battalion (1.Kompanie./Pz.Afkl.Abt.9) of the 9th Panzer Division. It reached combat readiness by March 1944. This time it consisted of 25 tanks - one HQ and six in each of the four platoons. These tanks did not reach the Eastern Front; first combat use was in France in June 1944. The remaining assembled tanks were either later transferred to the specified units for additional recruitment or distributed piece by piece to other units.

One of the few operations in which the Luchs took part on a massive scale was the Operation Citadel. In its course, by August 17, 1943, only 5 tanks remained in an operational state in the 2nd tank reconnaissance company. By September 1, out of 29 vehicles, 10 remained in the company in one form or another. In these formations the Luchs were used until the end of World War II.

== Variants ==
- Luchs 5 cm – an attempt to mount the 5 cm KwK 39 L/60 on a different turret. Production cancelled.
- Bergepanzer Luchs – an armored recovery vehicle version of the Luchs. Never produced.
- Flakpanzer Luchs (VK 13.05) – an anti-aircraft tank based on a lengthened chassis of the Luchs and armed with either the 20mm Flakvierling or 37mm Flak 36 gun was made, but this project was never realized.

== Surviving vehicles ==
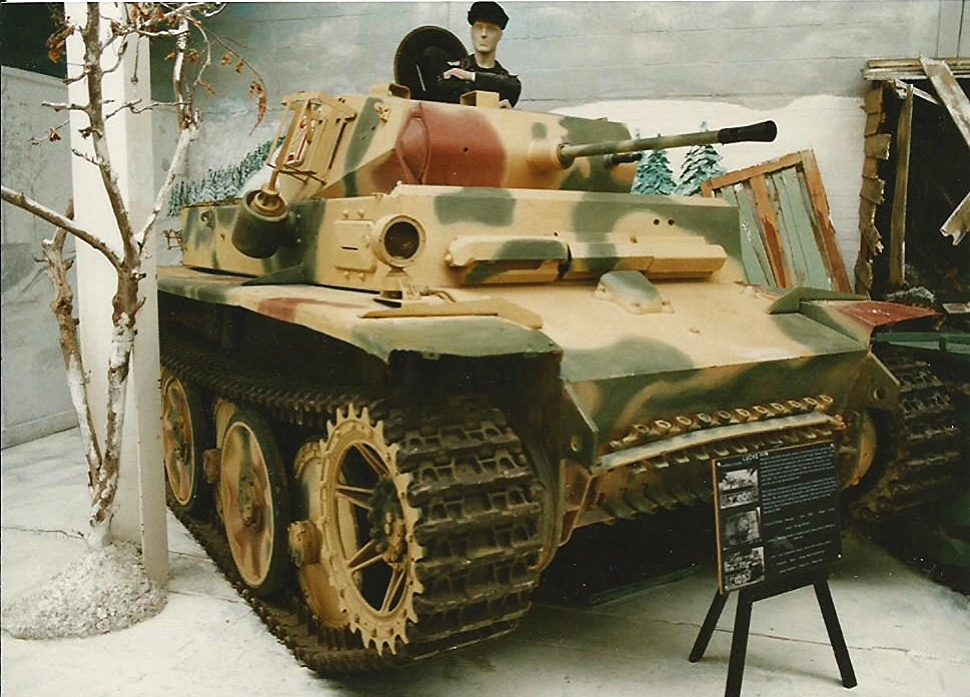
Luchs in Bovington Tank Museum

Of the original 100 Panzer II Luchs, there are only two surviving today. These are:

- France—Musée des Blindés in Saumur, chassis number 200164, running condition.
- United Kingdom—Bovington Tank Museum, chassis number 200117. Original interior, almost perfectly complete.

== See also ==
- VK 1602 Leopard
