= FAMO =

German vehicle manufacturer

FAMO, short for Fahrzeug- und Motoren-Werke (Automobile and Engine Works) was a German vehicle manufacturer in the early 20th century. They produced tractors and lorries, and other motor vehicle parts.

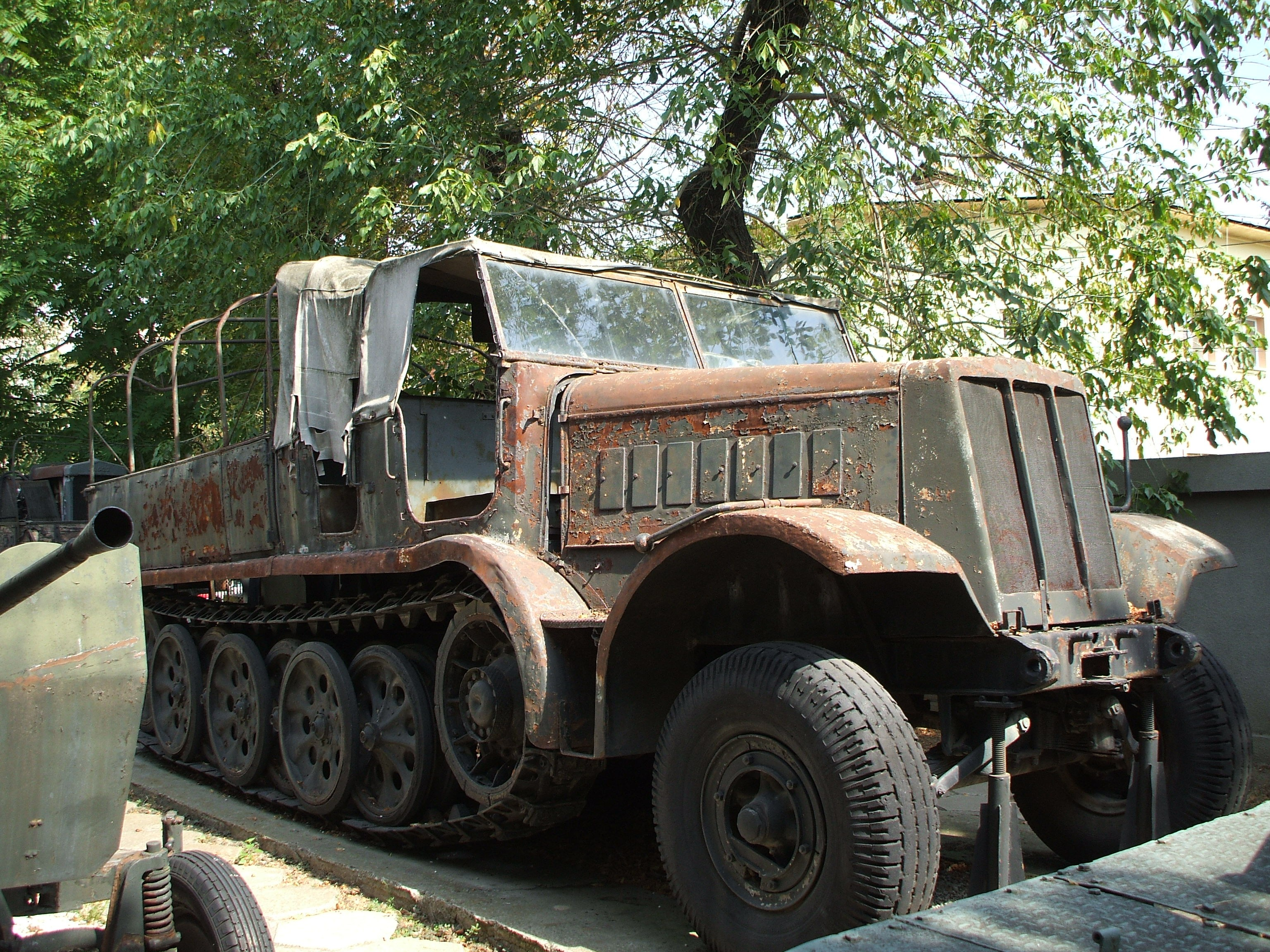
Sd.Kfz. 9 in the Bucharest military museum

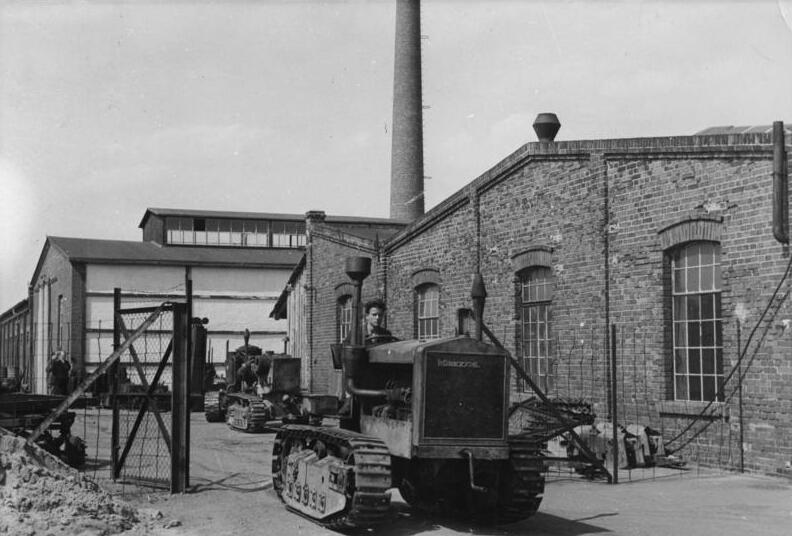
Rübezahl diesel caterpillar tractor in 1948

== Products ==
- Sd.Kfz. 9: Heavy half-track used by German forces in World War II; some were also produced by Vomag and Tatra.
- Marder II, produced 1942–1943.
- Wespe self-propelled artillery
- Rübezahl caterpillar tractor
