= KMP =

KMP may refer to:

- Hungarian Communist Party (Kommunisták Magyarországi Pártja)
- KMP Expressways Ltd, constructing the Kundli–Manesar–Palwal Expressway, Haryana, India
- Kempton Park railway station, Surrey, National Rail station code
- Kent M. Pitman, known as KMP
- Kilusang Magbubukid ng Pilipinas, a labor center of peasants in the Philippines
- Knuth–Morris–Pratt algorithm, a search algorithm
- K-Multimedia Player
- KM Produce, a Japanese adult video company
- Khulna Metropolitan Police
- Kotlin Multiplatform
