= Maybach HL230 =

German V12 petrol engine

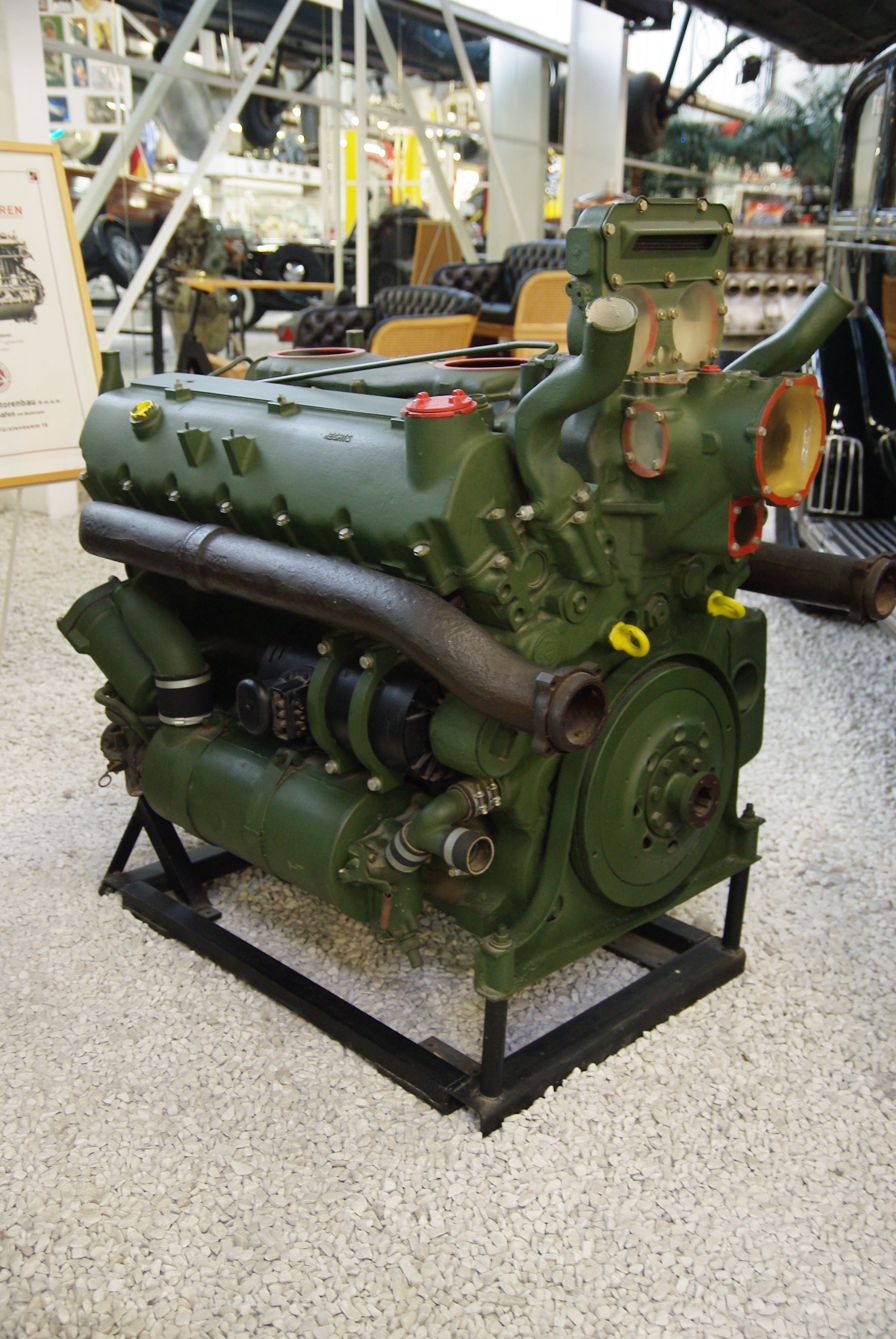
- The Maybach HL230 P30 in Sinsheim Auto & Technik Museum

Overview
- Manufacturer: Maybach

Layout
- Configuration: V12
- Displacement: 23.1 L (23,095 cc; 1,409.3 cu in)
- Cylinder bore: 130 mm (5.1 in)
- Piston stroke: 145 mm (5.7 in)
- Cylinder block material: Grey cast iron
- Cylinder head material: Grey cast iron
- Valvetrain: SOHC
- Compression ratio: 6.8:1

Combustion
- Fuel type: Gasoline

Output
- Power output: 700 PS (510 kW; 690 hp) at 3,000 rpm

Dimensions
- Dry weight: 1,200 kg (2,600 lb)

The Maybach HL230 was a water-cooled 60° 23-litre V12 petrol engine. It was one of many different sized engines designed by Maybach. It was used during World War II in medium and heavy German tanks – the Panther, Jagdpanther, Tiger II, Jagdtiger (HL230 P30), and later versions of the Tiger I and Sturmtiger (HL230 P45).

== Description ==
=== HL 210 ===
The HL 230 engine was an upgraded version of the slightly smaller HL210 engine which was used to equip the first 250 Tiger I tanks built, and which had an aluminium crankcase and block. The earlier HL210 engine had a displacement of 21.4 L (21,353 cc; 1,303.0 cu in) or 1,779 cc (108.6 cu in) per cylinder; with a bore of 125 mm (4.9 in) and stroke of 145 mm (5.7 in).

=== HL 230 ===
With the HL230, engine bore was increased from 125 to 130 mm (4.9 to 5.1 in). It had a displacement of 23.1 L (23,095 cc; 1,409.3 cu in), or 1,925 cc (117.5 cu in) per cylinder from a bore of 130 mm (5.1 in) and stroke of 145 mm (5.7 in). The maximum power output was 700 PS (690 hp; 510 kW) at 3,000 rpm. Maximum torque is 1,850 N⋅m (1,360 ft⋅lb) at 2,100 rpm. Typical output was 600 PS (590 hp; 440 kW) at 2,500 rpm.

The crankcase and block of the HL230 were made of grey cast iron and the cylinder heads from cast iron. The engine weighed 1,200 kg (2,600 lb) and its dimensions were 1,000 mm × 1,190 mm × 1,310 mm (3 ft 3 in × 3 ft 11 in × 4 ft 4 in). Aspiration was provided by four twin-choke Solex type 52JFF carburettors. Ignition was by two magnetos. The compression ratio was 6.8:1. As was typical practice for Maybach, the engine used a tunnel crankshaft.

Late in the war the HL234 upgrade with fuel injection was recommended by the Entwicklungskommission Panzer for use in the underpowered Tiger II tank. The power output was expected to increase to between 800 and 900 PS (590 and 660 kW), and with supercharging to 1,100 to 1,200 PS (810 to 880 kW).

== Production ==
Approximately 9,000 HL230s were produced in total by Maybach, Auto Union and Daimler-Benz.

Beginning on 3 November 1944, they were produced at the Richard I underground factory at Leitmeritz concentration camp.

== See also ==
- List of WWII Maybach engines
- Kharkiv model V-2, equivalent contemporary Soviet tank engine
- Rolls-Royce Meteor, equivalent contemporary British tank engine
