= Kilopondmetre =

kilopondmetre
- Unit system: Gravitational metric system
- Unit of: Torque, Energy
- Symbol: kp·m, m·kp

Conversions
1 kp·m in ...	... is equal to ...
- SI: 9.80665 N·m; 9.80665 J

The kilopondmetre is an obsolete unit of torque and energy in the gravitational metric system. It is abbreviated kp·m or m·kp, older publications often use mkg and kgm as well.

Torque is a product of the length of a lever and the force applied to the lever. One kilopond is the force applied to one kilogram due to gravitational acceleration; this force is exactly 9.80665 N. This means 1 kp·m = 9.80665 kg·m/s^{2} = 9.80665 N·m.

A related unit is the kgf·cm, which is sometimes found in technical datasheets. With the kgf being the same as the kp, and one metre being 100 centimetres, one kp·m equals 100 kgf·cm.

== See also ==
- List of metric units
