= 10.5 cm leFH 18M =

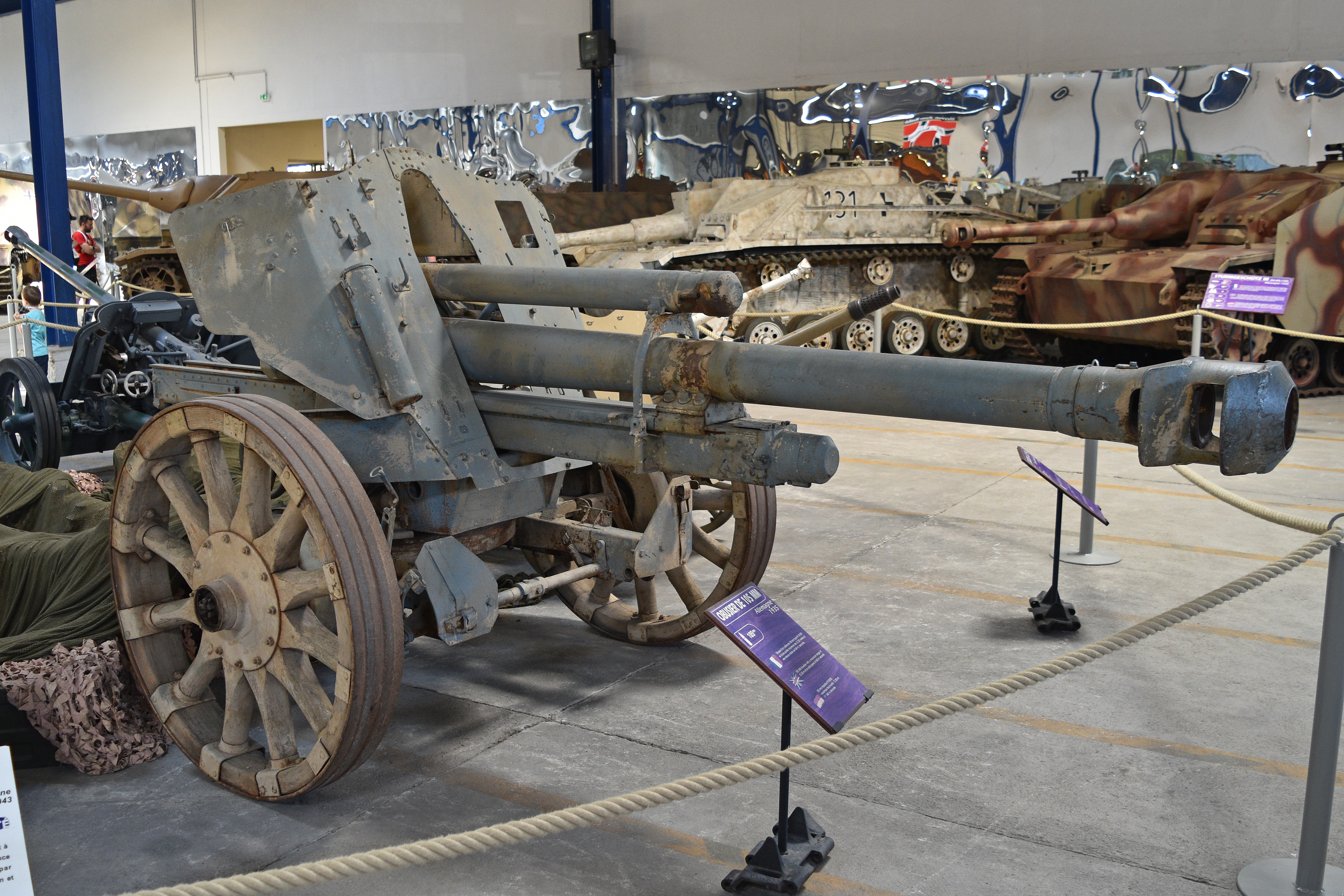
- On display at the Musée des Blindés, Saumur
- Type: Howitzer
- Place of origin: Germany

Service history
- In service: 1941–45
- Used by: See § Operators
- Wars: World War II; Portuguese Colonial War; Syrian Civil War

Production history
- Designed: 1940–41
- Manufacturer: Rheinmetall
- Produced: 1941–45

Specifications
- Mass: 1,985 kg (4,376 lb)
- Barrel length: 2.941 m (9 ft 8 in) (28 calibers); 3.271 m (10 ft 9 in) (with Muzzle brake)
- Shell: Separate QF (6 charges) 105 x 155mm R
- Shell weight: 14.81 kg (32 lb 10 oz) (HE); 15.71 kg (34 lb 10 oz) (AP)
- Caliber: 105 mm (4.13 in)
- Breech: Horizontal sliding-block
- Recoil: Hydro-pneumatic
- Carriage: Split trail
- Elevation: -6° 30' to +40° 30'
- Traverse: 56°
- Rate of fire: 4–6 rpm
- Muzzle velocity: 540 m/s (1,772 ft/s)
- Maximum firing range: 12,325 m (13,479 yds)
- Filling: TNT
- Filling weight: 1.38 kg (3 lb 1 oz)

The 10.5 cm leFH 18M (German: leichte Feldhaubitze "light field howitzer") was a German light howitzer used in the Second World War. The gun, less the carriage and shield, was also used as the armament of the Sd.Kfz. 124 Wespe self-propelled artillery vehicle. It was an improved version of the 10.5cm leFH 18 howitzer that offered superior range.

== History ==
The 10.5 cm leFH 18M superseded the 10.5 cm leFH 18 as the standard German divisional field howitzer used during the Second World War. It was designed and developed by Rheinmetall after the war broke out in an effort to get more range from the basic leFH 18 design. A muzzle brake was fitted and the recoil system adjusted to allow the use of a more powerful charge and new long-range shell. Generally it did not equip independent artillery battalions until after the Battle of Stalingrad in 1943. 53 were also exported to Finland, where they were known as 105 H 33.

During the Syrian Civil War, some rebel groups such as the Islamic Front and Ahrar al-Sham seized some guns and ammunition from museums or Syrian Arab Army warehouses.

== Description ==
Many were converted from the 10.5 cm leFH 18 and retained their original wood-spoked or pressed steel wheels. The former were only suitable for horse traction. Initially, it was fitted with a single-baffle muzzle brake of relatively low efficiency. This was later improved by welding two protruding ears to the rear of the port. However this style of muzzle brake proved troublesome with the early designs of high velocity anti-tank shells and a new cage-type muzzle brake was designed and fitted.

The new FH Gr Fern long-range shell was about 25 millimetres (0.98 in) longer than the normal shells used by the leFH 18 guns, but had a shorter streamlined section behind the driving band to accommodate the larger powder charge required. This fit in the standard cartridge case, but protruded about 50 millimetres (2.0 in) past its mouth.

Ballistically, the 10.5 cm leFH 18M and the leFH 18/40 are identical.

== Operators ==
- Nazi Germany
- Portugal – Supplied by Nazi Germany. Saw use during the Portuguese Colonial War
- Syria − Supplied by Czechoslovakia. Saw limited use during the Syrian Civil War
- Yugoslavia

== See also ==
- 10.5 cm leFH 16, a field howitzer used by Germany in World War I and World War II
- 10.5 cm leFH 18, previous version of the leFH 18/M
- 10.5 cm leFH 18/40, a light howitzer mounted on a 7.5 cm PaK 40 antitank gun carriage, used by Germany in World War II
- Wespe, a self-propelled gun based on a leFH 18/M mounted on a modified Panzer II chassis, used by Germany in World War II

== Sources ==
- Engelmann, Joachim and Scheibert, Horst. Deutsche Artillerie 1934-1945: Eine Dokumentation in Text, Skizzen und Bildern: Ausrüstung, Gliederung, Ausbildung, Führung, Einsatz. Limburg/Lahn, Germany: C. A. Starke, 1974
- Foss, Christopher F. (1981). Artillery of the world (3rd ed.). New York: Charles Scribner's Sons. ISBN 978-0-684-16722-0 – via Internet Archive.
- Gander, Terry and Chamberlain, Peter. Weapons of the Third Reich: An Encyclopedic Survey of All Small Arms, Artillery and Special Weapons of the German Land Forces 1939-1945. New York: Doubleday, 1979 ISBN 0-385-15090-3
- Hogg, Ian V. German Artillery of World War Two. 2nd corrected edition. Mechanicsville, PA: Stackpole Books, 1997 ISBN 1-85367-480-X
