= 10.5 cm Feldhaubitze M.12 =

Obuzierul Krupp, caliber 105 mm, model 1912
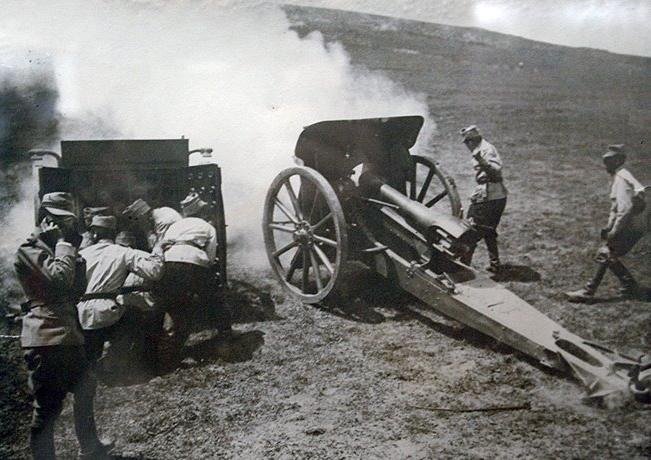
- A pair of Model 1912 howitzers firing during the Battle of Mărăști Kingdom of Romania
- Type: Howitzer

Service history
- In service: 1912–1945
- Used by: Romania; Bulgaria
- Wars: Second Balkan War; World War I Hungarian-Romanian War; World War II

Production history
- Designer: Krupp, with input from Romanian specialists
- Manufacturer: Krupp
- Produced: 1912-1914
- No. built: 120

Specifications
- Mass: 1,155 kilograms (2,546 lb)
- Barrel length: 1.47 metres (4 ft 10 in) L/14
- Shell: 14 kilograms (31 lb)
- Caliber: 105 mm (4.134 in)
- Carriage: box trail
- Elevation: -5° to +60°
- Traverse: 6°
- Muzzle velocity: 300 m/s (985 ft/s)
- Maximum firing range: 6,500 metres (7,100 yd)

The Obuzierul Krupp, caliber 105 mm, model 1912 was a Romanian requested upgrade of the German 10.5 cm Feldhaubitze 98/09 howitzer used extensively during World War I. After two years of planning and experimentation by Romanian officers, the final design was approved and put into production by Krupp. The German aiming system was replaced with an improved Romanian system and the maximum range was increased to 6,500 meters, being superior to the 6,300 meters maximum range of its German counterpart. Maximum elevation was also increased from 40° to 60°. The first pieces started to arrive in Romania in 1912, and by the start of World War I thirty batteries (120 pieces) were in service, their performance during the war being described as "flawless". However, wartime attrition was heavy and by the beginning of 1918, only 64 remained in service. They appear to have lingered in Romanian service into World War II. Guns captured by the Bulgarians appear to have been placed into service during World War I, although they seem to have been out of service by the outbreak of World War II.

== Surviving examples ==
- National Military Museum, Romania, Bucharest.
- Belgrade Military Museum, Serbia

== See also ==
- 10.5 cm leFH 16 1916 successor to 10.5 cm Feldhaubitze 98/09
- Artillery of World War I
- List of World War II artillery
