= Hummel (vehicle) =

German self-propelled gun

Sd.Kfz. 165 Hummel
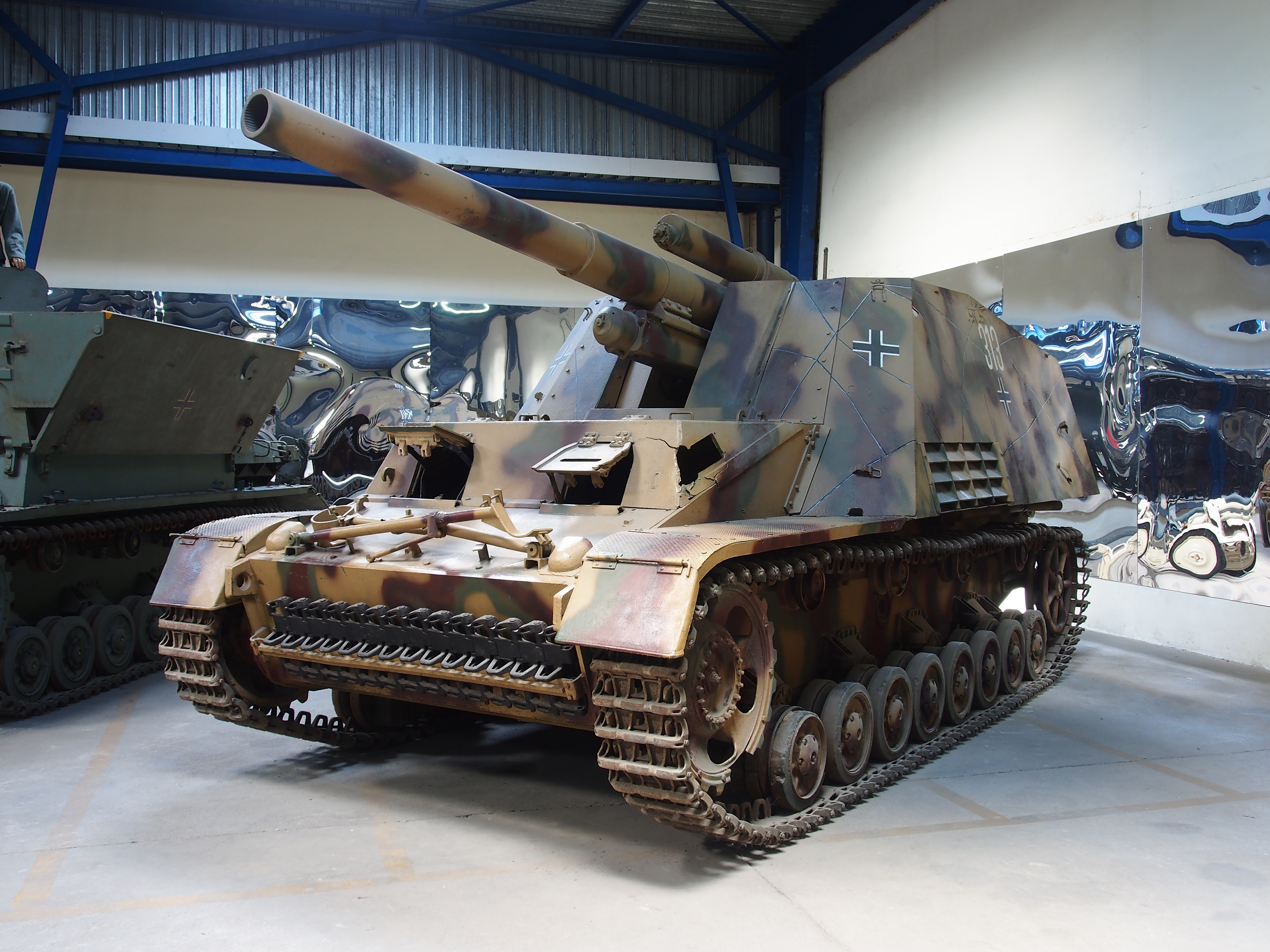
- A Hummel on display at the Musée des Blindés in 2013
- Type: Self-propelled artillery
- Place of origin: Nazi Germany

Service history
- In service: 1943–1945
- Wars: World War II

Production history
- No. built: 714

Specifications
- Mass: 24 tonnes (52,910 lb)
- Length: 7.17 m (23 ft 6 in)
- Width: 2.97 m (9 ft 9 in)
- Height: 2.81 m (9 ft 3 in)
- Crew: 6 - Driver and 5 gun crew
- Armor: 10–30 mm (.39 - 1.18 in)
- Main armament: Hummel: 1 × 15 cm sFH 18/1 L/30 18 rounds; Hummel-Wespe: 1 × 10.5 cm leFH 18/40 L/28 18+ rounds
- Secondary armament: 1 × 7.92 mm Maschinengewehr 34; 600 rounds
- Engine: Maybach HL120 TRM V-12 petrol 300 PS (296 hp, 221 kW)
- Power/weight: 12.5 PS/tonne
- Suspension: Leaf spring
- Operational range: 215 km (133 mi)
- Maximum speed: 42 km/h (26 mph)

Hummel (German: "bumblebee") was a German self-propelled gun used by the Wehrmacht during World War II. Based on the Geschützwagen III/IV chassis and armed with the 15 cm sFH 18/1 L/30 howitzer, it saw action from early 1943 until the end of the war. Its ordnance inventory designation was Sd.Kfz. 165.

The full name was Panzerfeldhaubitze 18M auf Geschützwagen III/IV (Sf) Hummel, Sd.Kfz. 165. On February 27, 1944, Hitler ordered the name Hummel to be dropped as it was deemed inappropriate for a fighting vehicle.

== Development ==
The Hummel was designed in 1942 after the invasion of the USSR had demonstrated the need for more capable self-propelled artillery support for Wehrmacht tank forces than those that were available at the time.

The first option considered was mounting a 10.5 cm leFH 18 howitzer on a Panzer III chassis, rejected in favour of the same gun on a Panzer IV chassis. One prototype was built.

This design was rejected in favour of mounting the more powerful 15 cm sFH 18 L/30 howitzer on the specially designed Geschützwagen III/IV, which combined the driving and steering system of the Panzer III with the chassis, suspension, and engine of the Panzer IV. The same platform was used for the Nashorn tank destroyer.

The engine was moved to the centre of the vehicle to make room for an open-topped lightly armoured fighting compartment at the rear, which housed the gun breech and crew. Late models had a slightly redesigned driver compartment and front superstructure, offering more room to the radio operator and driver. In all, some 700 Hummel were built.

== Variants ==
- Munitionsträger Hummel ("ammunition carrier Hummel") - Because the basic Hummel could carry only a limited amount of ammunition, an ammunition carrier based on the Hummel was developed. This was basically a standard production Hummel without the howitzer (a 10 mm armour plate covering the gun mount) and with racks fitted to hold the ammunition. When necessary, these could still be fitted with the 15 cm howitzer of the normal Hummel; this could even be done as a field conversion. By the end of the war, 157 Munitionsträger Hummel had been built.

== Combat history ==
The Hummel first participated in large scale combat at the Battle of Kursk, when some 100 served in armored artillery battalions (Panzerartillerie Abteilungen) of the Panzer divisions. They were formed into separate heavy self-propelled artillery batteries, each with six Hummel and one ammunition carrier.

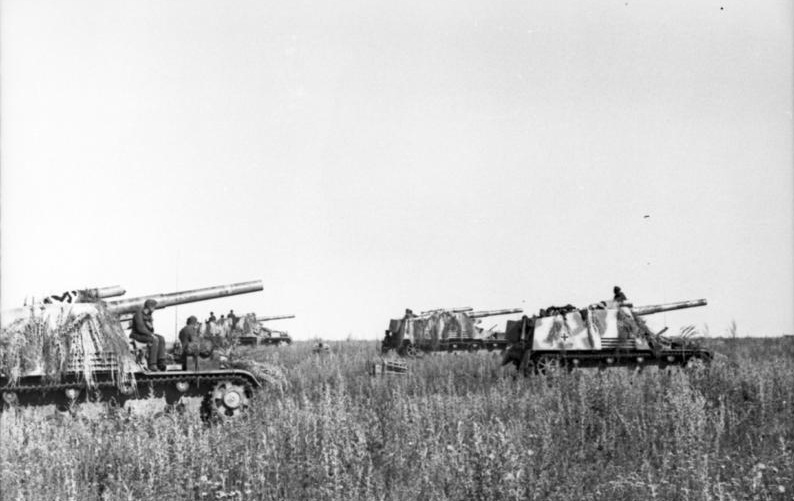
A battery of Hummel howitzers in field position, Eastern Front, June – July 1943

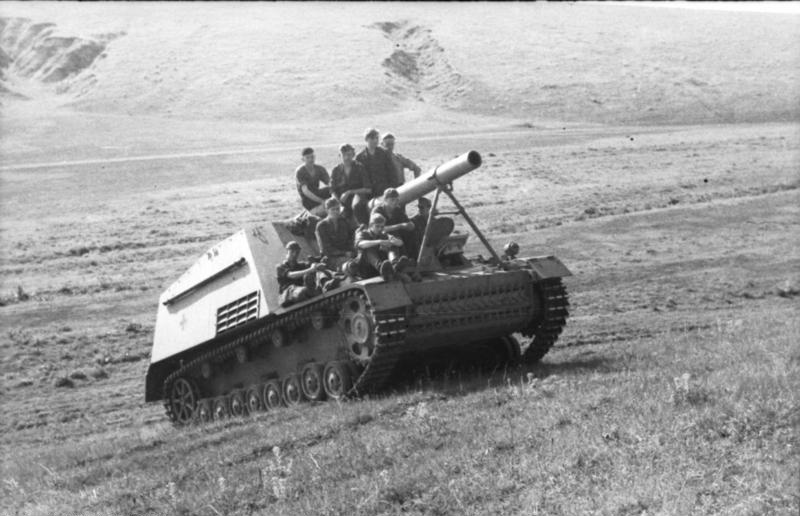
A Hummel navigates a hill in central-southern USSR (June – July 1943)

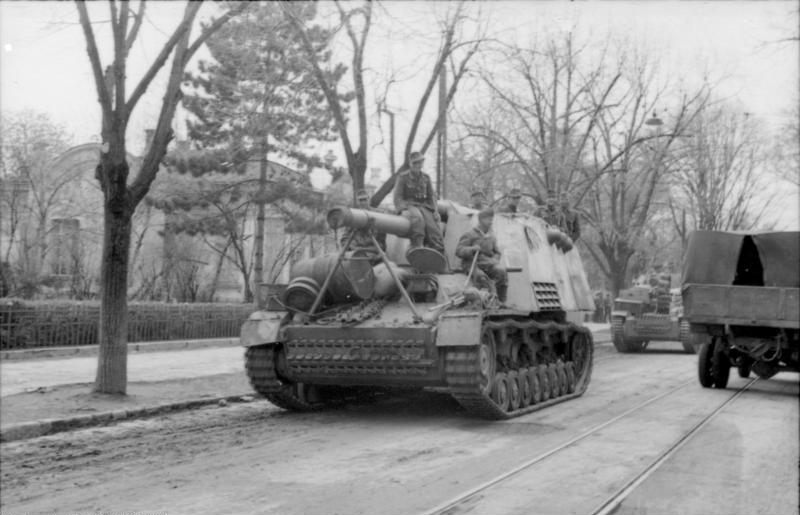
A Hummel passes through a town in Romania, March 1944

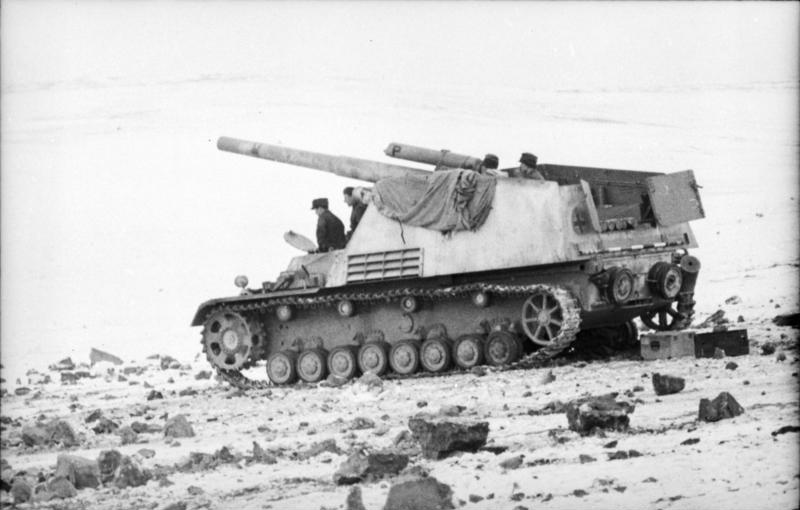
A Hummel on the Eastern Front, January – February 1944

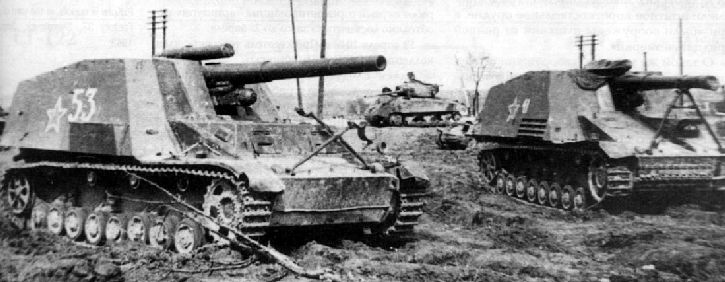
Captured Hummel in Soviet markings, date unknown

== Foreign use ==
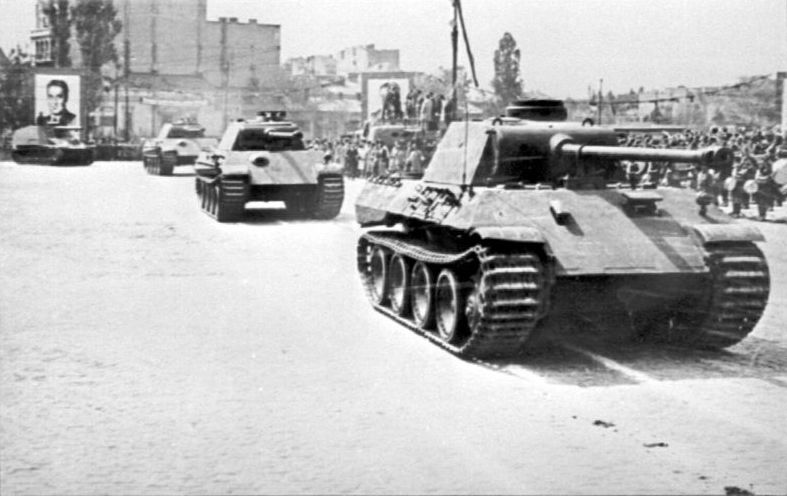
Romanian Hummel seen in the background during a 1946 military parade, behind three Panther tanks

Foreign use of the Hummel was extremely limited. During WWII, the Soviet Union deployed captured vehicles. Post-war, only three nations are known to have acquired the gun, Czechoslovakia, Romania and Syria.

Romania received at least three examples post-war from captured Soviet stocks. At least one of the vehicles was showcased to the public during a military parade in Bucharest on 10 May 1946, with Romanian markings. All German armour in Romania was later phased out in 1950 and finally scrapped by 1954, the army deciding on the sole use of Soviet tanks and armoured fighting vehicles (AFVs) instead.

Syria received five Hummel from France between the late 1940s and the early 1950s. Only a limited supply of main gun ammunition was provided (supplemented some time later by the Soviet Union, which had produced a sizeable quantity of compatible 150mm rounds domestically). These saw service against Israel up until the 1960s and all were most likely scrapped shortly afterwards.

== Operators ==
- Nazi Germany
- Czechoslovakia - 12 Hummel-Wespe
- Socialist Republic of Romania - at least three
- Syria - five, captured guns received from France

== Surviving vehicles ==
Six Hummel survive in museums, at the Munster Deutsches Panzermuseum, the Artillerie Schule in Idar Oberstein and the Sinsheim Auto & Technik Museum in Germany, the Musée des Blindés in Saumur, France and the Fort Sill Field Artillery Museum in Fort Sill, Oklahoma and one has been reconstructed at the Australian Armour and Artillery Museum and is awaiting the Winterketten track.

== Sources ==
- Doyle, Hilary Louis & Jentz, Thomas L. (2023). Sf. Artillerie: PzSfl.IVb to Hummel-Wespe. Panzer Tracts. Vol. 10–1 (revised ed.). Old Heathfield, UK: Panzerwrecks. ISBN 978-1-915969-19-4.
- Scafes, Cornel I; Scafes, Ioan I; Șerbănescu, Horia Vl (2005). Trupele Blindate din Armata Romana 1919-1947. Bucharest: Editura Oscar Print.
