= Wespe =

German self-propelled howitzer

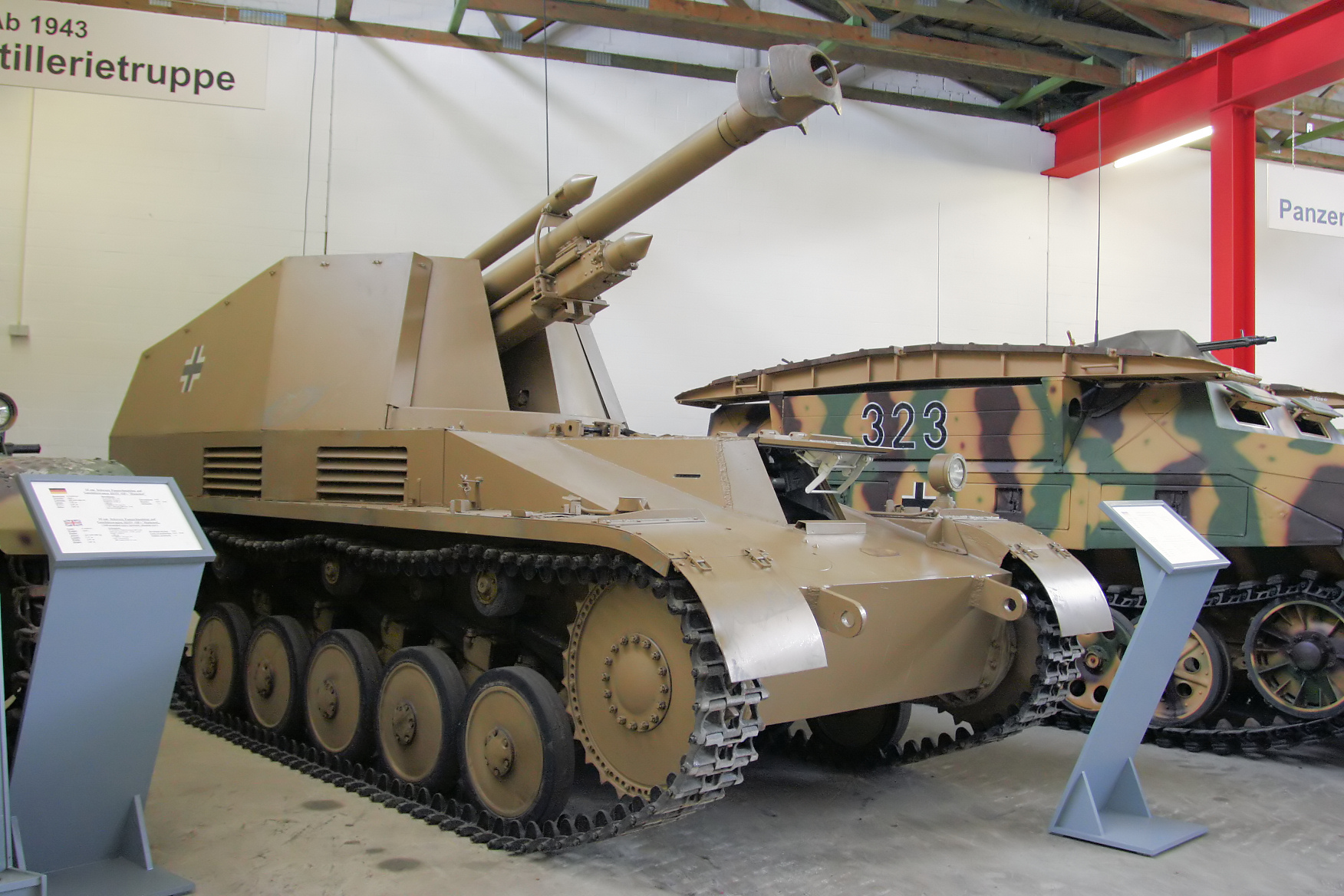
- Wespe at the Deutsches Panzermuseum in Munster, Germany
- Type: Self-propelled artillery
- Place of origin: Nazi Germany

Service history
- In service: 1943–1945
- Used by: Nazi Germany
- Wars: World War II

Production history
- Designer: Alkett
- Designed: 1942
- Manufacturer: Famo-Ursus
- Produced: 1943–1944
- No. built: 676
- Variants: ammunition carrier

Specifications
- Mass: 11 tonnes (24,250 lb)
- Length: 4.81 m (15 ft 9 in)
- Width: 2.28 m (7 ft 6 in)
- Height: 2.3 m (7 ft 7 in)
- Crew: 5 (commander, driver, three gunners)
- Armor: 5 - 30 mm (.19 - 1.18 in)
- Main armament: 1x 10.5 cm leFH 18/2 L/28 with 40 rounds
- Engine: 6-cyl petrol Maybach HL62 TR; 140 PS (138 hp, 103 kW)
- Power/weight: 12.7 PS/tonne
- Suspension: leaf spring
- Operational range: 220 km (137 mi)
- Maximum speed: 40 km/h (25 mph)

The Sd.Kfz. 124 Wespe (German for wasp), also known as Leichte Feldhaubitze 18/2 auf Fahrgestell Panzerkampfwagen II (Sf.) ("Light field howitzer 18 on Panzer II chassis (self-propelled)"), is a German self-propelled gun developed and used during the Second World War. It was based on a modified Panzer II chassis.

== Development ==
During the 1940 Battle of France, it became apparent that the intermediate tank of the German forces, the Panzer II, was unsuitable as a main battle tank. Though mechanically sound, it was both under-gunned and under-armoured. The chassis, however, proved serviceable for providing mobility to the 10.5 cm field howitzer. Existing chassis were converted to self-propelled artillery and tank destroyer vehicles, such as the Marder II conversion providing mobility to the PaK 40/7.5 cm anti-tank gun.

The design for the Wespe was produced by Alkett, based on the Panzer II Ausf. F chassis. Alkett had earlier worked with Alfred Becker to convert captured French armoured vehicles into self-propelled artillery carriers. Among other modifications the Panzer II's engine was moved forward and the chassis slightly lengthened to accommodate the rear-mounted 10.5 cm leFH 18 howitzer. The superstructure was lightly armored, with 10 mm armor plate (enough to stop small arms fire) left open at the top and rear. The vehicles were produced by FAMO's Ursus plant in Warsaw.

The Wespe was in production from February 1943 until June 1944, when Soviet forces approached the frontier. By that time, 676 had been produced. An additional 159 gun-less Wespe were produced to serve as mobile artillery ammunition carriers.

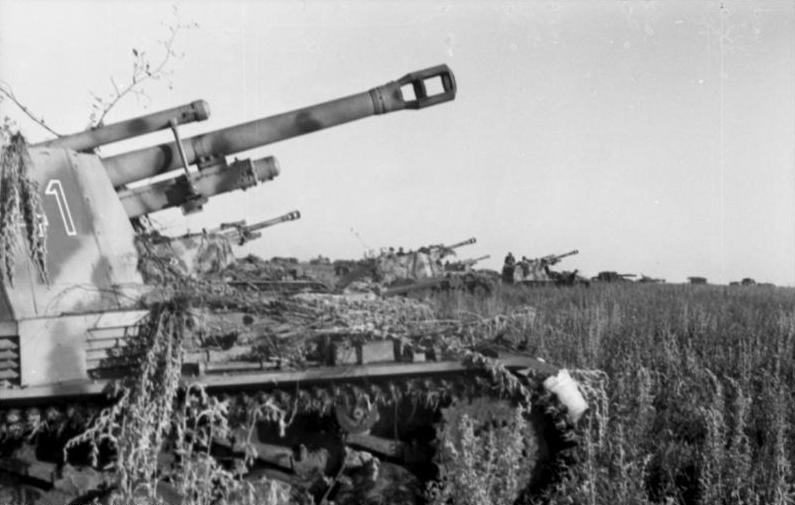
A battery of Wespe self-propelled howitzers supporting German forces during the Battle of Kursk

== Combat history ==
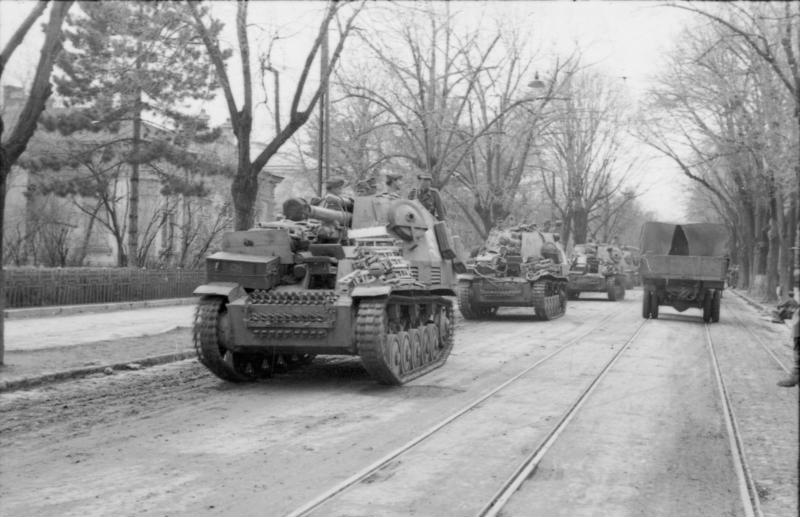
Wespe howitzers move through a town in Romania, March - April 1944

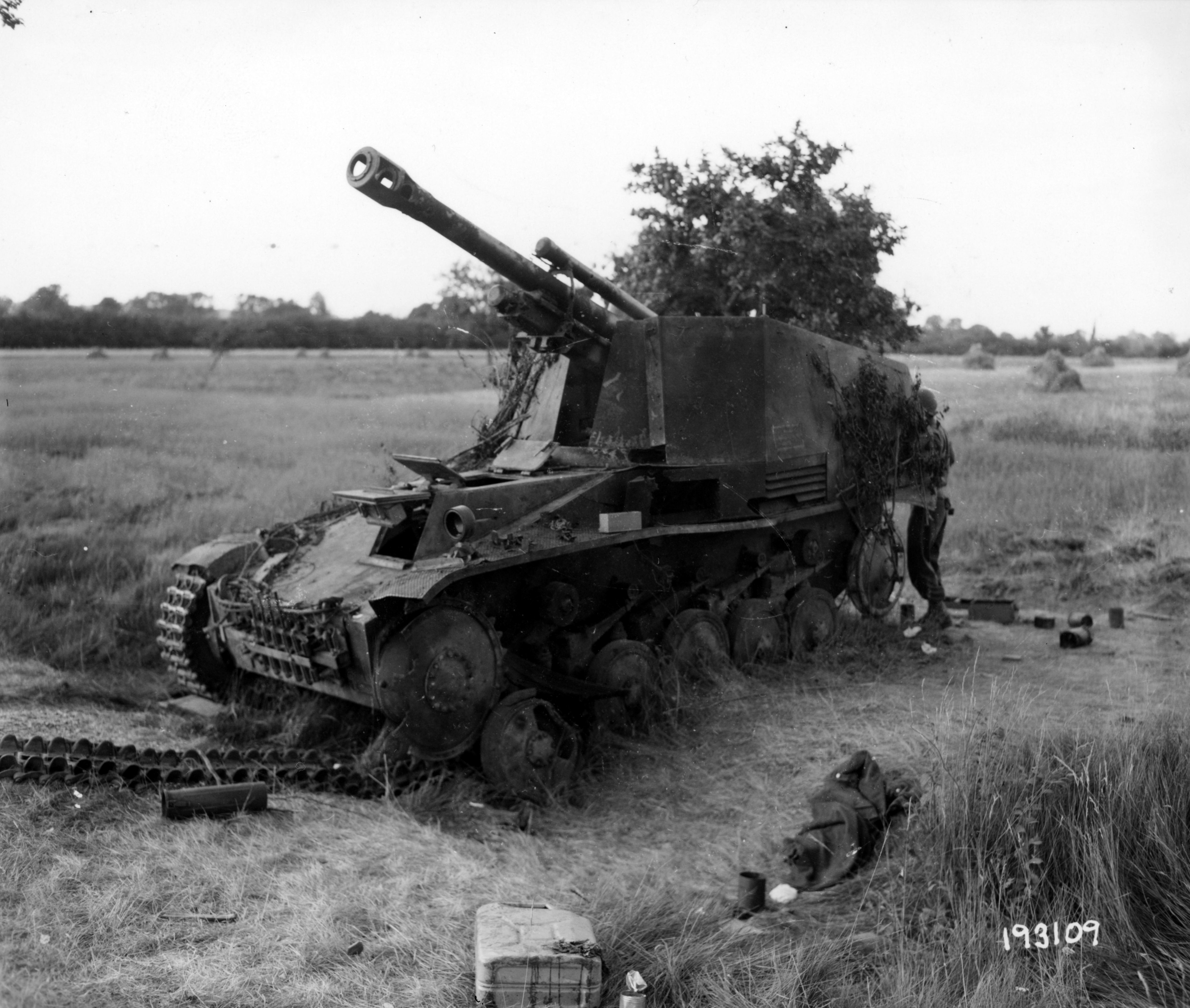
A Wespe destroyed in Normandy, 1944.

The Wespe first saw combat in 1943 on the Eastern Front. It proved very successful, and Hitler ordered all Panzer II chassis production be dedicated to the Wespe alone, at the expense of other projects, including the Marder II self-propelled anti-tank gun.

The vehicles were allocated to the armored artillery battalions (Panzerartillerie Abteilungen) of Panzer divisions along with heavier Hummel self-propelled artillery. The Wespe brought greater mobility to the artillery formations of the panzer divisions.

The Wespe proved reliable and highly maneuverable, but like contemporary self propelled guns such as the British Sexton and U.S. M7 Priest, had inadequate overhead gun crew protection. The Wespe was a considerably smaller target than either of these allied vehicles, but it also held less ammunition given it was based on a smaller chassis chosen based upon availability given limited production capacity for larger ones.

== Surviving vehicles ==
- Deutsches Panzermuseum in Munster, Germany
- Musée des Blindés in Saumur, France
- Kubinka Tank Museum in Russia
- Memorial Museum of the Battle of Normandy in Bayeux, France. A Wespe, destroyed in the Falaise Pocket in August 1944, is included in a diorama about the Battle of the Falaise Pocket.
- Two at the André Becker Collection in Belgium
- A replica, originally made for the movie A Bridge Too Far, is displayed at the Sinsheim Auto & Technik Museum.
- An example located Australian Armour and Artillery Museum in Smithfield, Cairns, Queensland, Australia has been restored to full running condition, with periodic updates posted on YouTube in 2026.

== Bibliography ==
- Doyle, Hilary Louis & Jentz, Thomas L. (2023). Sf. Artillerie: PzSfl.IVb to Hummel-Wespe. Panzer Tracts. Vol. 10–1 (revised ed.). Old Heathfield, UK: Panzerwrecks. ISBN 978-1-915969-19-4.
