= 10.5 cm leFH 18 =

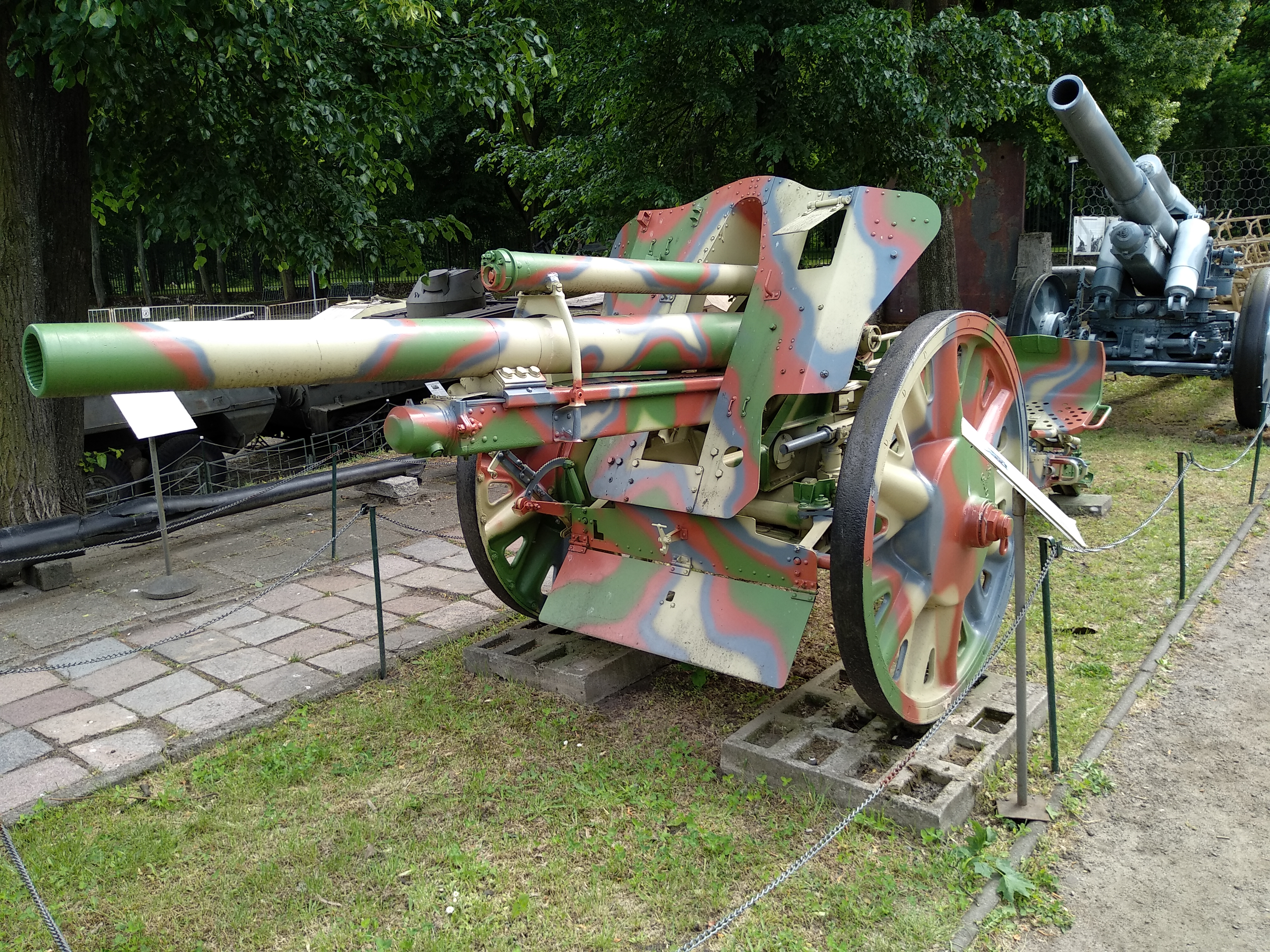
- LeFH 18 in camouflage at the Museum of the Polish Army in Warsaw
- Type: Howitzer
- Place of origin: Germany

Service history
- In service: 1935–1945 (Germany); 1939–1982 (Sweden)
- Used by: Germany; See Operators
- Wars: World War II; Slovak–Hungarian War; Portuguese Colonial War; Syrian Civil War

Production history
- Designer: Rheinmetall
- Designed: 1927–1930
- Manufacturer: Rheinmetall; Krupp
- Unit cost: 3,200 man-hours 16,400 RM (1943)
- Produced: 1935–1945
- No. built: 11,848 (original variant); 10,265 (10.5 cm leFH 18/40)
- Variants: leFH 18M, leFH 18/40

Specifications
- Mass: Travel: 3,490 kg (7,690 lb); Combat: 1,985 kg (4,376 lb)
- Length: 6.100 m (20 ft 0.2 in)
- Barrel length: 2.941 m (9 ft 8 in) (28 calibers)
- Width: 1.977 m (6 ft 5.8 in)
- Height: 1.880 m (6 ft 2.0 in)
- Crew: 6
- Shell: cased separate-loading (6 charges) 105 x 155mm R
- Shell weight: 14.81 kg (32.7 lb) (HE)
- Caliber: 105 mm (4.13 in)
- Breech: horizontal sliding-block
- Recoil: hydro-pneumatic
- Carriage: split trail
- Elevation: -5° to +42°
- Traverse: 56°
- Rate of fire: 6-8 rpm
- Muzzle velocity: 470 m/s (1,500 ft/s)
- Maximum firing range: 10,675 m (11,674 yd)
- Sights: Model 34 Sighting Mechanism
- Filling: TNT
- Filling weight: 1.845 kg (4.07 lb)

The 10.5 cm leFH 18 (German: leichte Feldhaubitze "light field howitzer") is a German light howitzer used in World War II and the standard artillery piece of the Wehrmacht, adopted for service in 1935 and used by all divisions and artillery battalions. From 1935 to the end of the war, 11,848 were produced, along with 10,265 of the leFH 18/40 variant.

Designed in the late 1920s, it represented a major advance on its predecessor the 10.5 cm leFH 16. It was superior in caliber to its early opponents in the war, with adequate range and firepower, but the modern split trail gun carriage that provided it with more stability and traverse also rendered it overly heavy for a mobile role in the largely horse-drawn artillery battalions of the German army, particularly in the mud and snow of the Eastern Front.

The leFH 18 was further developed as the leFH 18M and leFH 18/40. Beginning in 1942, self-propelled versions were created by fitting the howitzer on a Panzer II, H35, Char B1 or 37L chassis. It was also used to equip German allies and neutral countries in Europe prior to and during the war.

== History ==
=== Development ===
During the 1920s, the Reichswehr carried out analyses that indicated the 105 mm projectile was more effective than a 75 mm equivalent, without a major increase in cost. On 1 June 1927, the Army Ordnance Office (Heereswaffenamt) issued Secret Command Matter No. 59/27, calling for the development of a new light field howitzer. The project was assigned Priority Level II, "most important work". Rheinmetall-Borsig of Düsseldorf drew up the blueprints and made the initial calculations in 1928. Design work was complete in 1930, with production commencing in the early 1930s.

=== Production ===
At the outbreak of World War II, the Wehrmacht had 4,862 leFH 18 howitzers. Deliveries from September 1939–February 1945 totaled 6,933 "leFH 18 on wheeled carriages". Rheinmetall and Krupp were the initial manufacturers, but by 1942 demand was exceeding output so they relocated all production to six firms in Plzeň, Altona, Elbing, Magdeburg, Dortmund and Borsigwalde. In 1943, the howitzer cost on average 16,400 RM, 6 months and 3,200 man hours to make.

== Design ==
The leFH 18 improved in most areas on its predecessor, the 10.5 cm leFH 16. A completely new three-point split trail gun carriage provided more stability and increased the traverse to 56 degrees. The sighting mechanism made it easier to fire at moving targets. The new gun carriage resulted in a major weight increase to over two tons. The heavier recoil of the higher muzzle velocity of 470 m/s was counteracted by a new pneumatic recuperator above the barrel, that provided compressed air and liquid in 55 °C to return the gun to firing position after firing. A barrel brake containing a water jacket and a fluid equalizer in the upper carriage also checked the recoil. The gun shield was a reinforced, tapered shield with flattened sides that could be folded down. The barrel was good for 10,000 to 12,000 shots. The howitzer could fire 28 different shell types. The main high explosive shell was nearly a kilogram lighter and contained a heavier explosive charge. The leFH proved an adaptable design, with a total of 28 different variants manufactured.

One issue with the design of the gun was that it was fairly heavy for a weapon of its class. This was because the weapon was designed to have a solid construction, which increased the weight. This was not seen as a concern at the time, as it was assumed that there would be an adequate supply of motor vehicles to tow it.

The pre-production wooden-spoke wheels were replaced beginning in 1936 with more durable light-metal cast wheel discs and removable tires that made the howitzer easier to tow. The motorized version was fitted with wider solid-rubber tires. A combination of wooden wheels and rubber tires was a frequent occurrence. Towards the end of the war, even older wooden wheels from the leFH 16 were used. The howitzer was designed from the start to be transported either by horse or motor vehicle. The heavy weight made horse-drawn transport difficult, especially in the mud and snow of the Eastern Front. The motorized version was attached directly without a limber to either a Sd.Kfz. 6 or Sd.Kfz. 11 prime mover and could easily achieve a march speed of 40 km/h, equivalent to a day's march by a horse-drawn battery. Although the Sd.Kfz. 6 was intended as the primary motor transport for the howitzer, the lighter Sd.Kfz. 11 could also achieve the same task. A motorized leFH 18 battery had a radius of action 10 times greater than a horse-drawn one and required 49 fewer personnel.

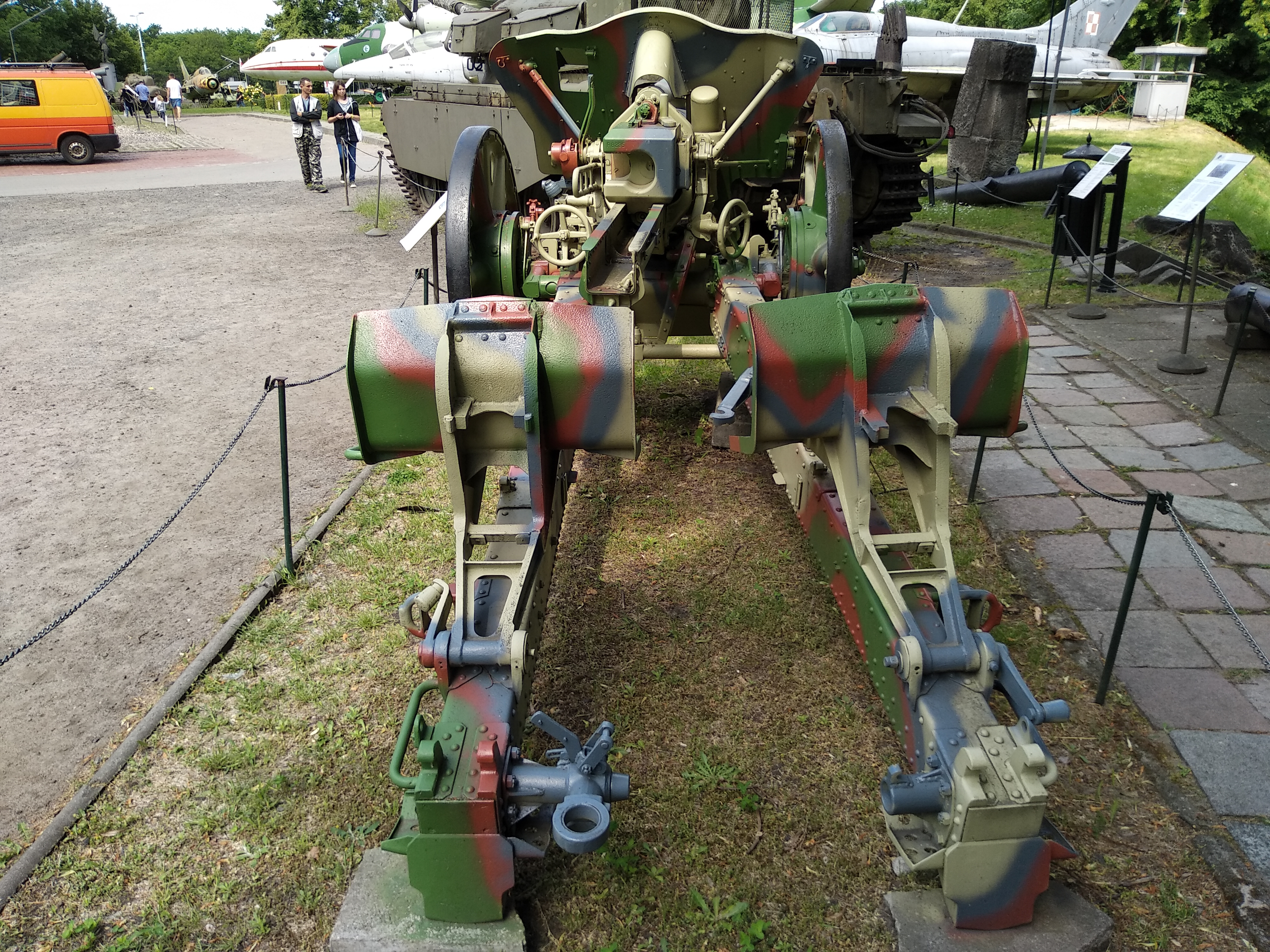
Back of LeFH 18

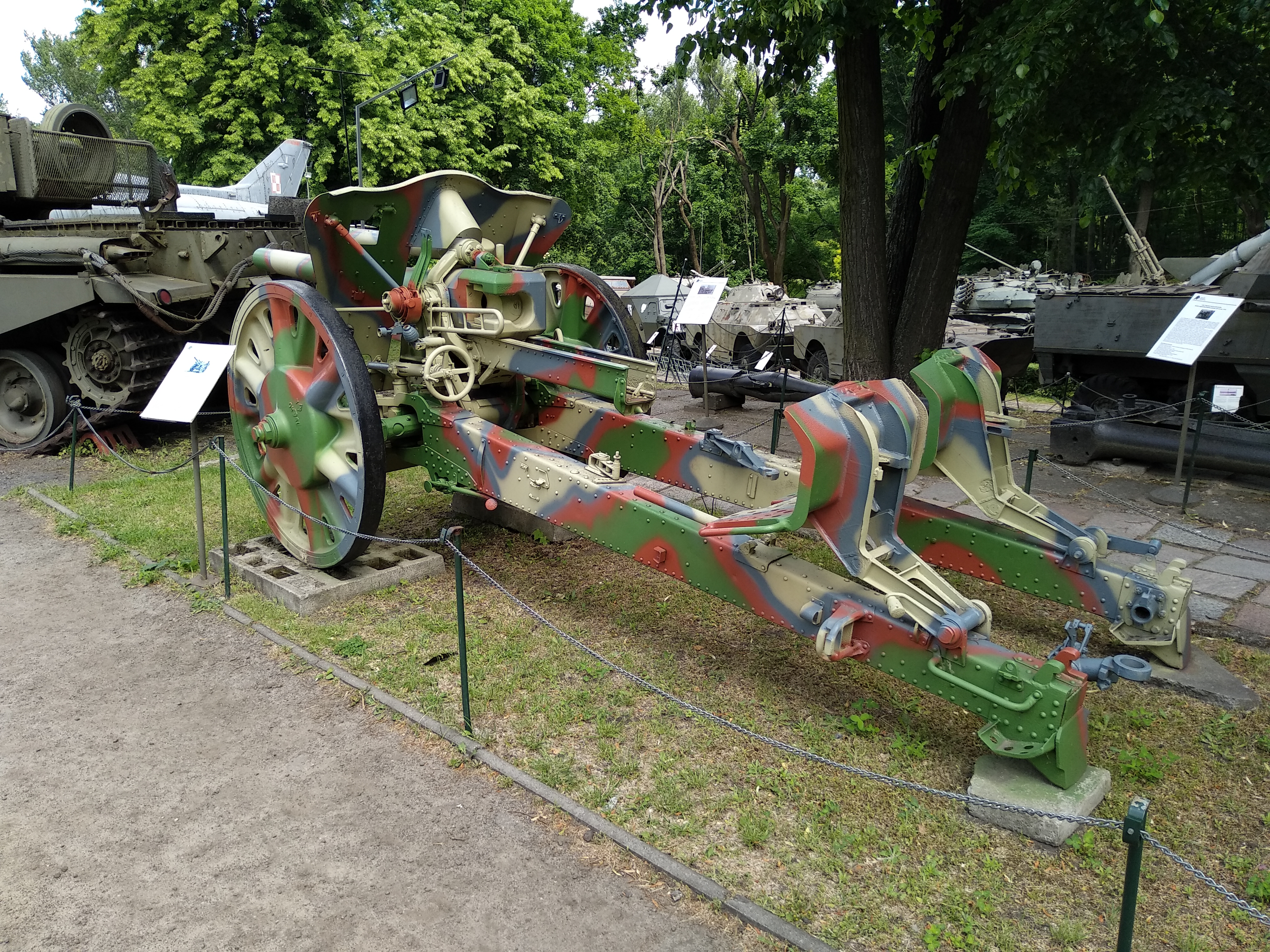
Left side view of LeFH 18

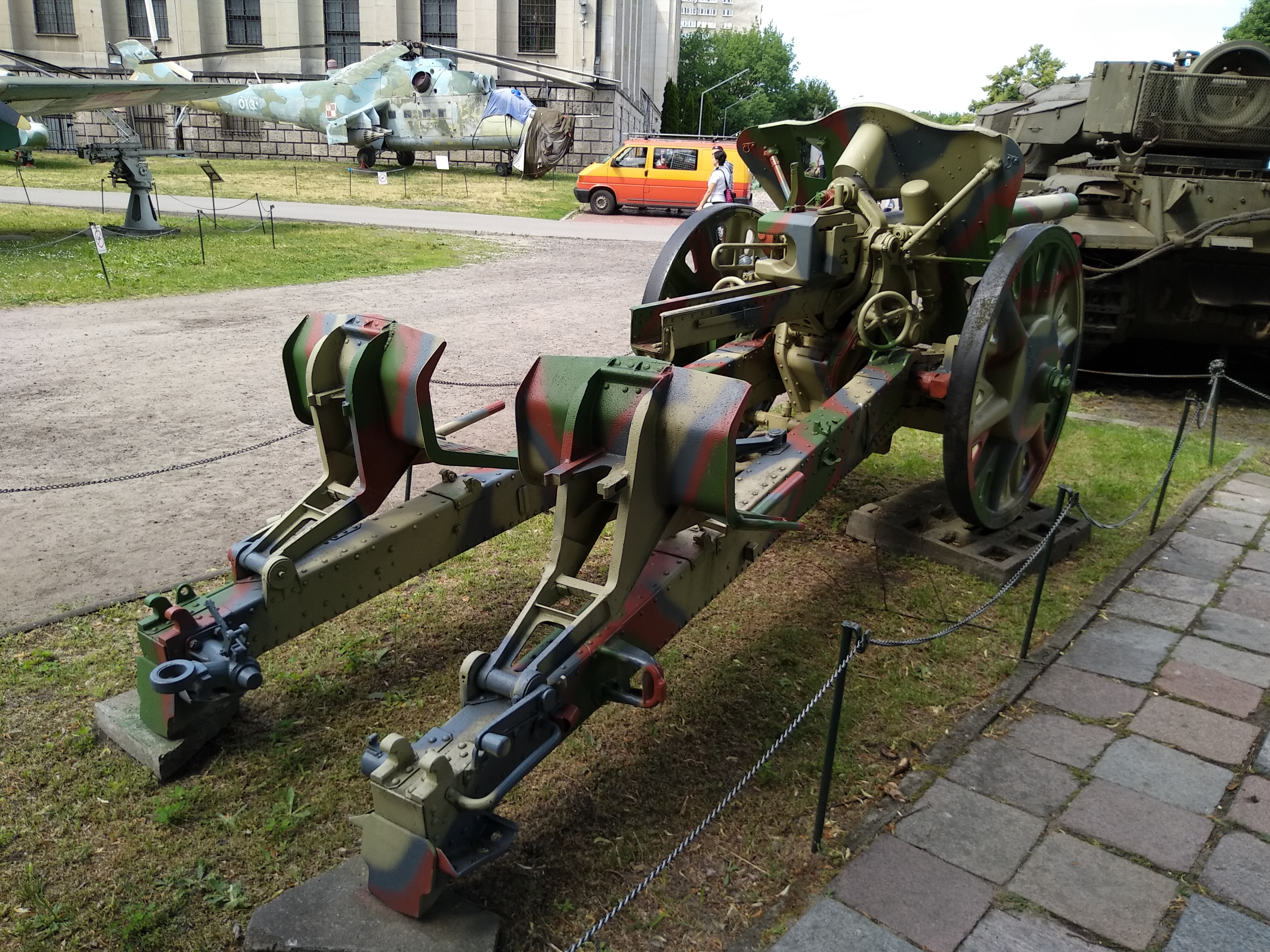
Right side view of LeFH 18

== Service ==
=== Germany ===
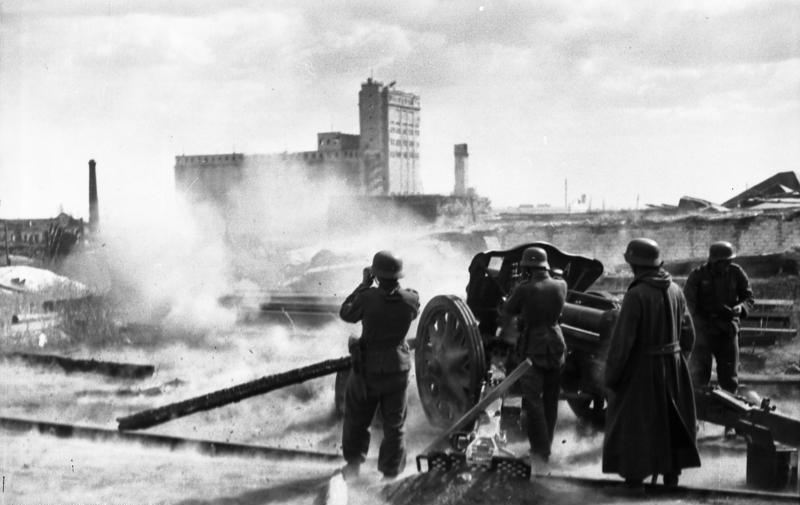
LeFH 18 howitzer in use at Stalingrad, 1942

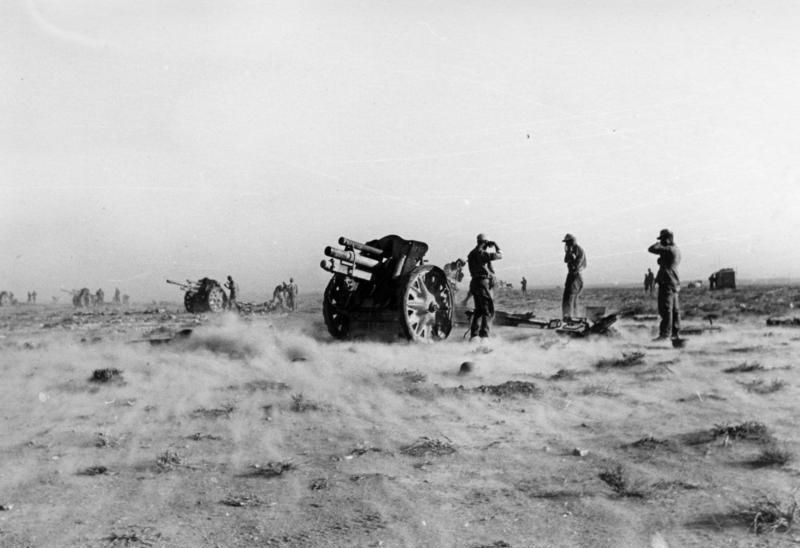
LeFH 18 battery in firing position in North Africa, June 1942

After trials, the field howitzer was officially introduced into Wehrmacht service on 26 July 1935 and replaced the leFH 16 in artillery battalions beginning in 1937. Important operational units, like the Panzer Divisions, were given priority in the reequipping. It became the standard divisional field howitzer used by the Wehrmacht during the Second World War. There were a total of 1,023 horse-drawn light field artillery battalions in the Wehrmacht and 62 motorized light artillery battalions in the Panzer and Panzergrenadier divisions, as well as GHQ artillery. The leFH 18 had a superior caliber compared to its opponents early in the war and performed well as the supporting arm of the panzer divisions.

While not ideally suited to it, the howitzer could in the right circumstances be effective in anti-tank combat, particularly in the North African Campaign where the motorized batteries of the 33rd Artillery Regiment of the 15th Panzer Division played an important role in defeating British armoured units at Sidi Rezegh on 23 November 1941 during Operation Crusader. On the Eastern Front, the light field howitzers were less successful in the anti-tank role.

During the Soviet counterattack in the Battle of Moscow, the retreating German horse-drawn artillery vehicles often had to be abandoned due to heavy snows and exhaustion. The experience of the first winter led to the use of larger draft horses and more fodder loaded on the limber. The crews had to walk on foot to spare the easily exhausted heavy horses. The desire to create a lighter carriage that would not hinder mobility to such a drastic extent led directly to the development of the leFH 18/40.

=== Other users ===
Before 1938 the leFH 18 was exported to Hungary and Spain. 53 were exported to Finland in February–March 1944, where they were known as 105 H 33. 166 leFH were exported to Bulgaria in 1943 and 1944 (until February 1, 1944) Sweden purchased 142 leFH 18 howitzers from Germany between 1939 and 1942, designating it Haubits m/39. It was decommissioned from Swedish service in 1982. Norway, Portugal and Slovakia also purchased the howitzer. Also, 32 were to be exported to Estonia between December 1940 to June 1941, but due to the breakout of World War II, the orders were not fulfilled.

After the end of WWII, Czechoslovakia exported some pieces to Israel, and Syria. During the Syrian Civil War, some rebel groups such as the Islamic Front and Ahrar al-Sham seized some guns and ammunition from museums or Syrian Arab Army warehouses. According to N. R. Jenzen-Jones, these guns were either captured by Soviet troops and later supplied to the Syrian government or sold by the East German government.

== Operators ==
- Bulgaria − 166 delivered 1943–1944.
- China
- Finland − 53 delivered in 1944. Known as 105 H 33.
- France − at least 74, from 1944 to 1945
- Germany
- Hungary
- Israel − At least 4 delivered from Czechoslovakia from 1948 to 1949 under the designation vz. 18/40 N
- North Korea
- Norway
- Portugal − used by the Portuguese Army during the African colonial wars of the 1960s and 1970s. Known as Obus K 10,5 cm/28 m/941.
- Romania
- Slovakia
- Spain
- Sweden − 142 purchased 1939–1942. Decommissioned in 1982.
- Syria − Supplied either by Czechoslovakia, the Soviet Union, or East Germany. Saw limited use during the Syrian Civil War with Syrian opposition groups

== See also ==
- 15 cm sFH 18 — The German Army's heavy divisional gun.
- Weapons employed in the Slovak–Hungarian War
- Wespe, a self-propelled gun using the leFH 18
- leFH18 auf B2, a self-propelled gun based on captured French B2 tanks

== Sources ==
- Bishop, C. (1998). The Encyclopedia of Weapons of World War II. Barnes & Noble. ISBN 978-0760710227.
- Engelmann, J. (1995) [1990]. Deutsche leichte Feldhaubitzen 1935-1945 [German Light Field Artillery in World War II]. Translated by Johnston, D. Atglen, PA: Schiffer Publishing. ISBN 978-0887407604.
- Engelmann, Joachim and Scheibert, Horst. Deutsche Artillerie 1934-1945: Eine Dokumentation in Text, Skizzen und Bildern: Ausrüstung, Gliederung, Ausbildung, Führung, Einsatz. Limburg/Lahn, Germany: C. A. Starke, 1974
- Gander, Terry and Chamberlain, Peter. Weapons of the Third Reich: An Encyclopedic Survey of All Small Arms, Artillery and Special Weapons of the German Land Forces 1939-1945. New York: Doubleday, 1979 ISBN 0-385-15090-3
- Hogg, Ian V. German Artillery of World War Two. 2nd corrected edition. Mechanicsville, PA: Stackpole Books, 1997 ISBN 1-85367-480-X
- Smisek, Martin (2021). Czechoslovak Arms Exports to the Middle East: Volume 1 − Origins, Israel and Jordan 1948−1989. Warwick, England: Helion & Company. ISBN 978-1-804511-11-4.
