= 10.5 cm Feldhaubitze 98/09 =

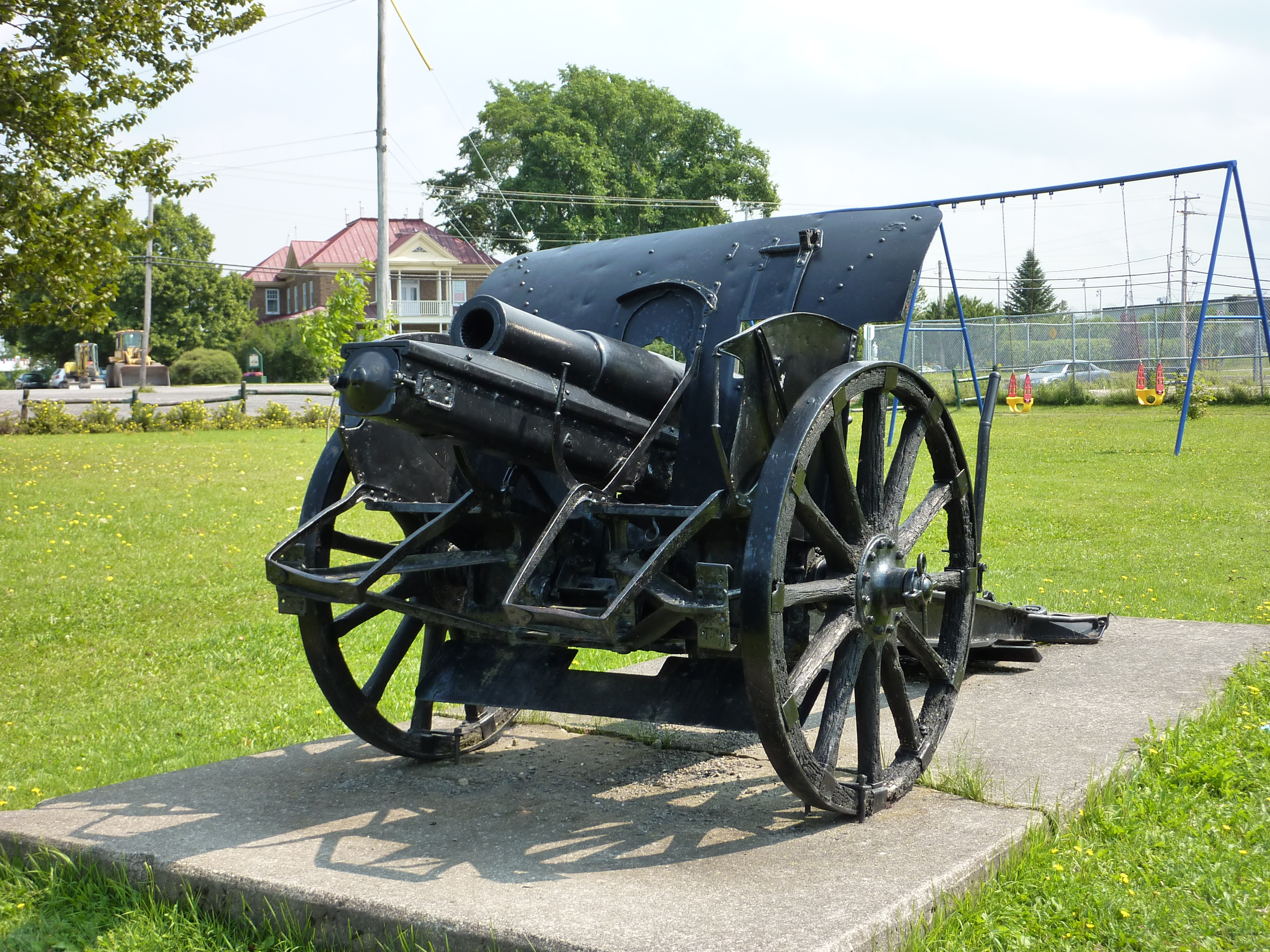
- A captured F.H. 98/09 in Sayabec, Quebec
- Type: Howitzer
- Place of origin: German Empire

Service history
- Used by: German Empire; Ottoman Empire; Romania
- Wars: World War I

Production history
- Designer: Krupp
- Designed: 1902−04
- Manufacturer: Krupp
- Produced: 1909−1918

Specifications
- Mass: 1,145 kg (2,519 lbs)
- Barrel length: 1.625 m (5 ft 4 in) L/15.5
- Width: 1.53 m (5 ft 0 in)
- Shell: Separate loading cased charge and projectile
- Caliber: 105 mm (4.13 in)
- Breech: Horizontal sliding-block
- Recoil: Hydro-spring
- Carriage: Box trail
- Elevation: -13° to +40°
- Traverse: 4°
- Muzzle velocity: 302 m/s (990 ft/s)
- Maximum firing range: 6,300 m (6,890 yds)

The 10.5 cm Feldhaubitze 98/09 (10.5 cm FH 98/09), a short barreled (1625 mm) 105mm howitzer, also referred to as the 10.5 cm leichte Feldhaubitze (light field howitzer) 98/09, was used by the German Empire, Kingdom of Romania as well as the Ottoman Empire in World War I and after. It had a maximum range of 6,300 metres (20,700 ft).

== History ==
It was originally built by Rheinmetall as the 10.5 cm Feldhaubitze 98, an old-fashioned, fixed-recoil weapon delivered to the German army in 1898; between 1902 and 1904, it was redesigned, by Krupp, with a new recoil mechanism and a new carriage. However, it wasn't accepted for service until 1909, hence the ending designation 98/09. Existing weapons were rebuilt to the new standard. As usual, two seats were attached to the gun shield. There were 1,260 in service at the beginning of World War I. Romania captured around 64 pieces from the German Army during World War I, and put them into service during the interwar years.

The 10.5 cm leFH 16 was introduced in 1916 as a successor to 10.5 cm Feldhaubitze 98/09, featuring a longer barrel and hence longer range.

== Ammunition ==
The 10.5 cm used three different types of ammunition and the aiming instruments were marked with three different meter scales and a dial sight for both direct and indirect fire. Originally, it used 7 charges of propellant, but this was increased during the war to 8 in an effort to extend its range.

- Feldhaubitz granate 98: A 15.8 kilogram (35 lb) high-explosive shell.
- Feldhaubitz schrapnel 98: A 12.8 kilogram (28 lb) shrapnel shell.

== See also ==
=== Weapons of comparable role, performance and era ===
- QF 4.5-inch howitzer British equivalent
- 10.5 cm Feldhaubitze M.12 Romanian upgrade of the 10.5 cm Feldhaubitze 98/09

== Gallery ==
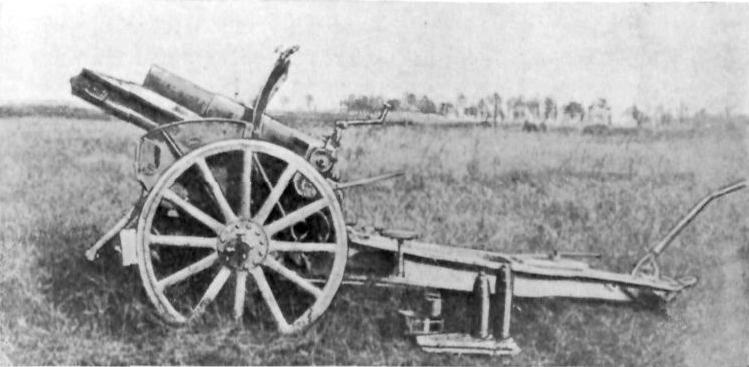
German 10.5-cm. light field howitzer with ammunition.

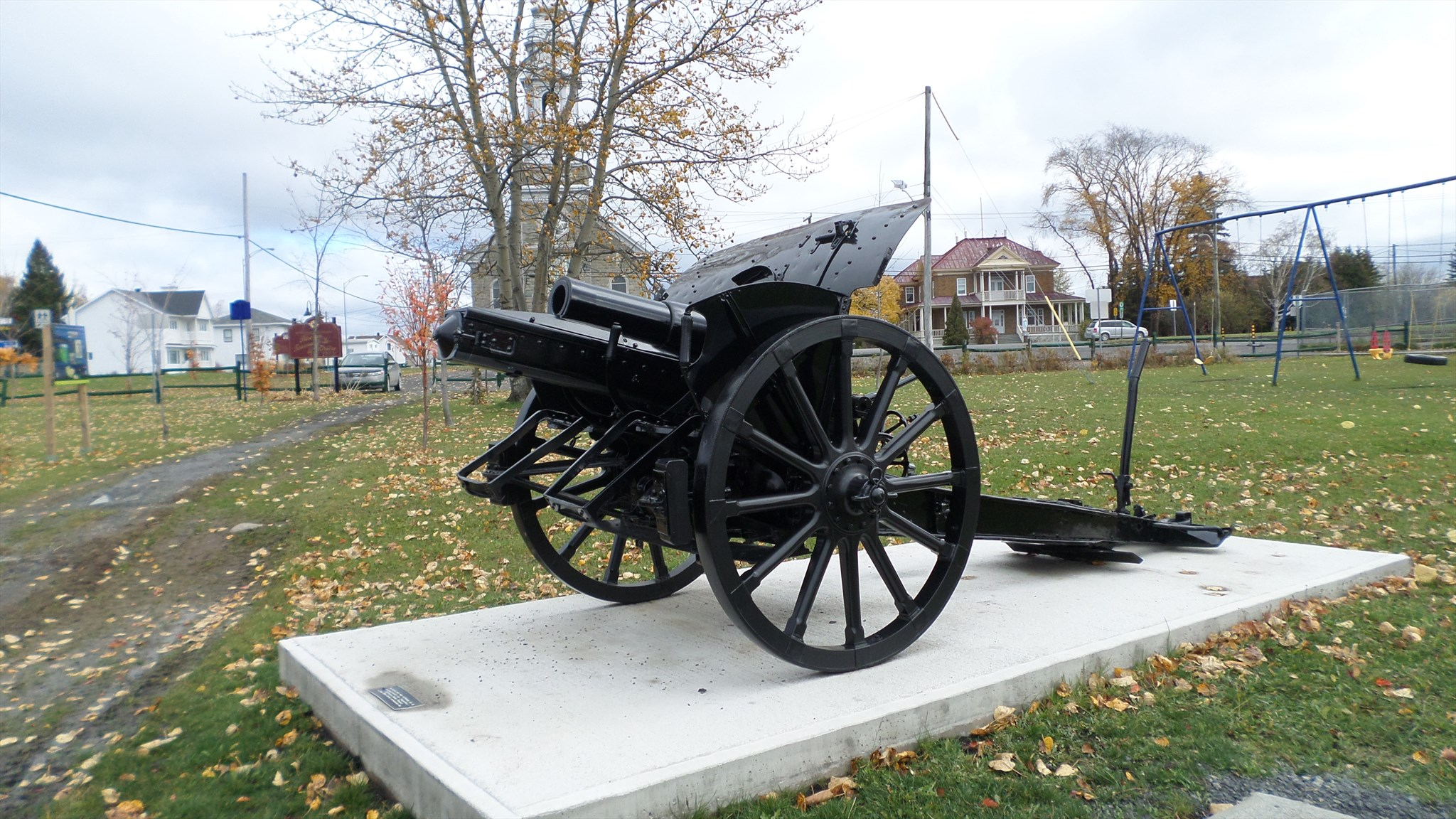
Sayabec's exposed F.H. 98/09 has received a well deserved restoration in the recent years including a new concrete pedestal, a new paint job and a different set of wheels. ( Uncertain about the historical accuracy of that change.)

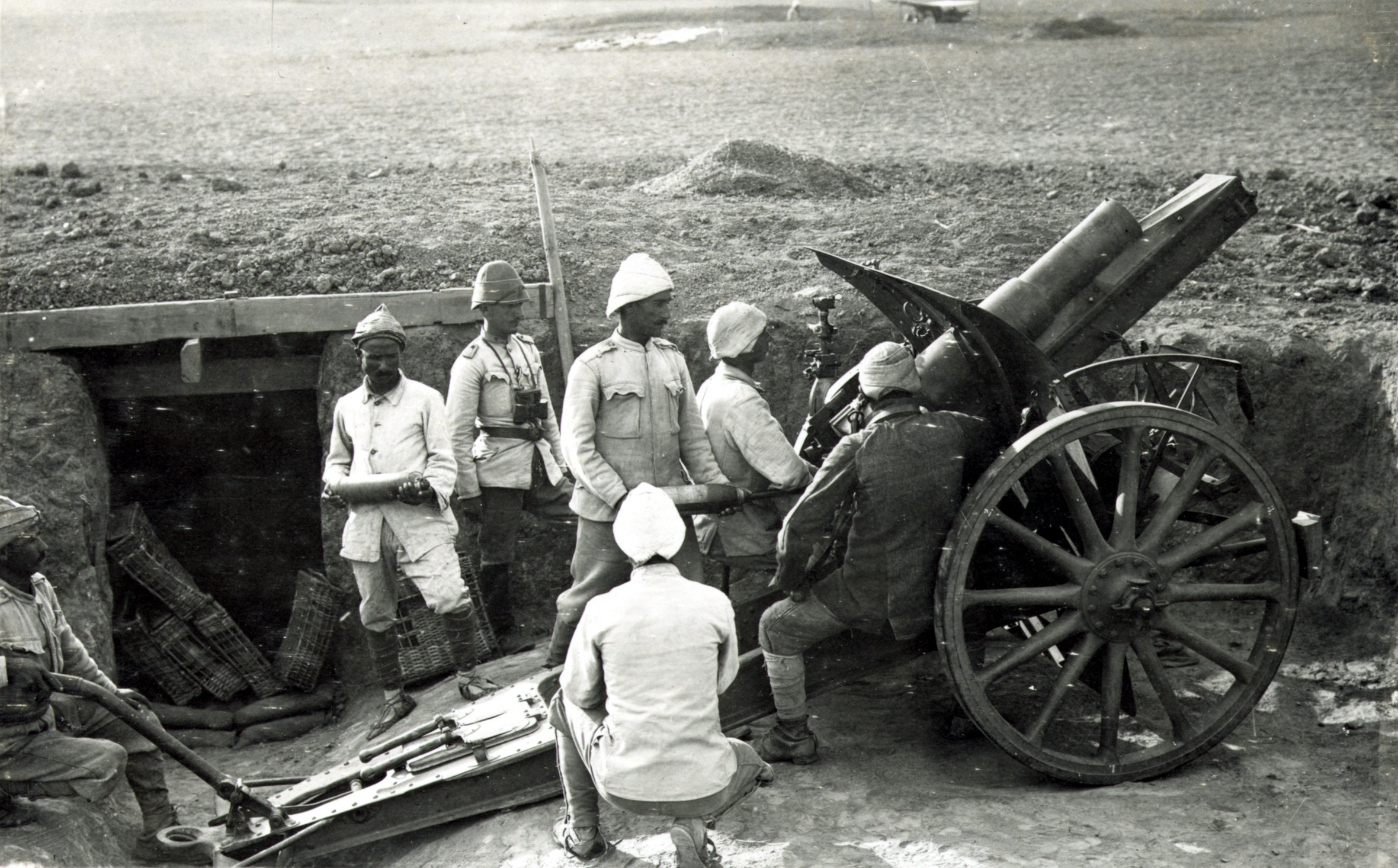
Turkish gunners in action, 1917.

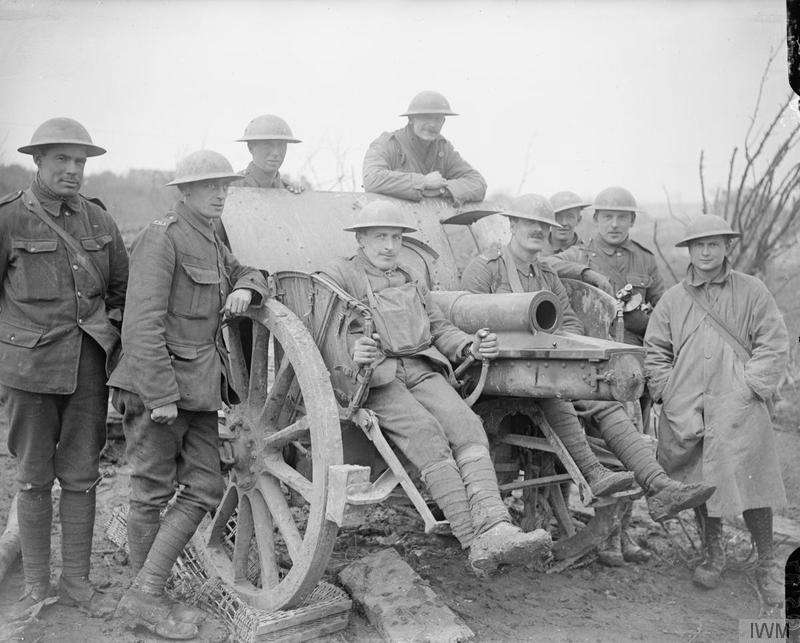
Gunners of the Royal Marine Artillery by a captured German 105 mm FH 98/09 field howitzer during the Battle of Arras, April 1917.
