= 10.5 cm leFH 18/40 =

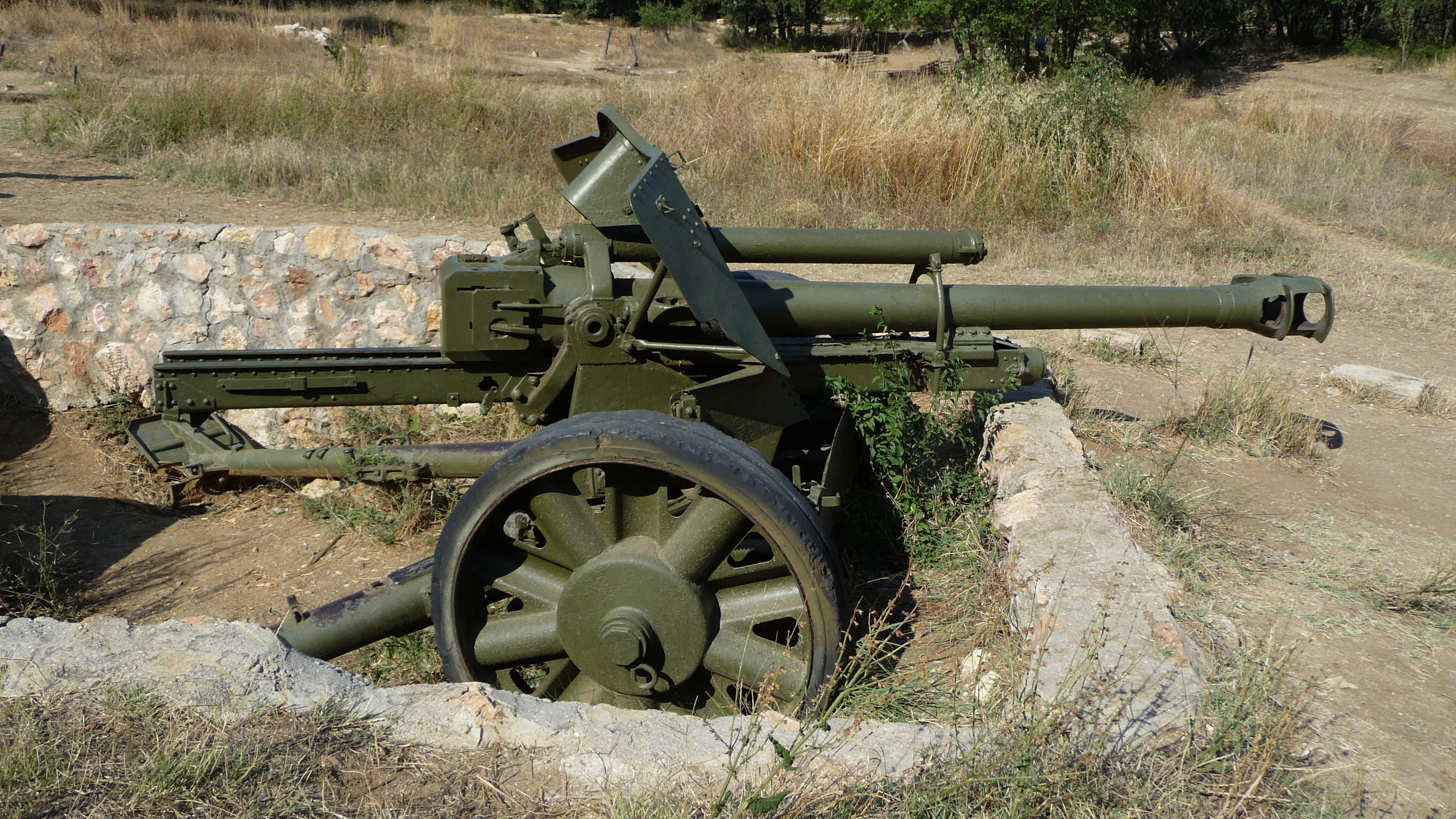
- 10.5 cm leFH 18/40 at the Sapun Mountain memorial near Sevastopol.
- Type: Howitzer
- Place of origin: Nazi Germany

Service history
- In service: 1943–1945
- Used by: See users
- Wars: World War II; Nigerian Civil War

Production history
- Designed: 1942–1943
- Produced: 1943–1945
- No. built: 10,265
- Variants: M18/49

Specifications
- Mass: 1,955 kg (4,311 lbs)
- Length: 2.94 m (9 ft 8 in)
- Barrel length: 2.941 m (9 ft 8 in) (28 calibers); 3.271 m (10 ft 9 in) (with muzzle brake)
- Shell: Separate QF (6 charges); 105 x 155mm R
- Caliber: 105 mm (4.13 in)
- Breech: Horizontal sliding-block
- Recoil: Hydro-pneumatic
- Carriage: Split-trail
- Elevation: -6° to +40°
- Traverse: 56°
- Rate of fire: 6-8 rpm
- Muzzle velocity: 540 m/s (1,772 ft/s)
- Effective firing range: 12,325 m (13,479 yds)

The 10.5 cm leFH 18/40 (German: leichte Feldhaubitze "light field howitzer") was a German light howitzer used in World War II.

== History ==
The 10.5 cm leFH 18/40 supplemented the 10.5 cm leFH 18 and the 10.5 cm leFH 18M as the standard divisional field howitzer used during the Second World War. It was designed in an effort to lighten the weight of the 105 mm artillery piece and to make it easier to produce. Generally it did not equip independent artillery battalions until after the Battle of Stalingrad in 1943. Some were also exported to Finland, where they were known as 105 H 33-40. The Romanian Army acquired a number of leFH 18/40 in 1943, to make up for the losses in artillery suffered during the Battle of Stalingrad. It again saw action during the Nigerian-Biafran war when Czechoslovakia gifted Biafra some pieces

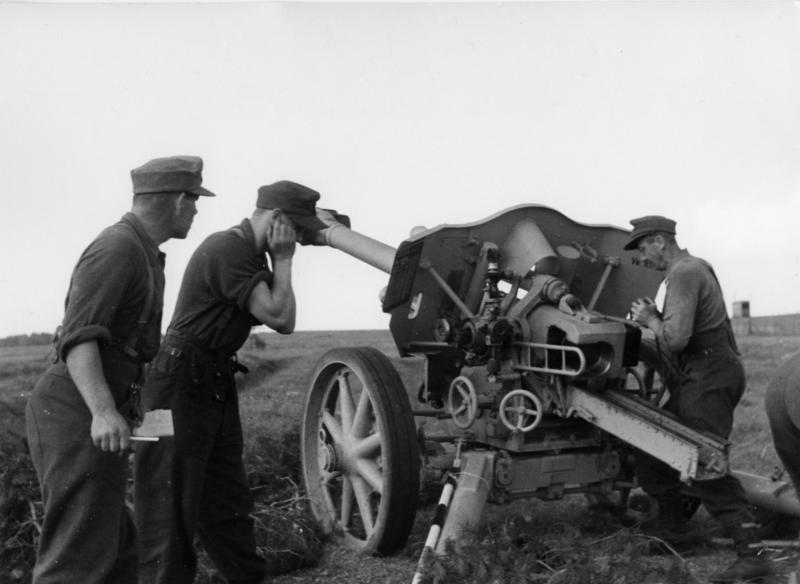
The leFH 18/40 on a fire mission on the Eastern Front.

== Description ==
In March 1942 a requirement was issued for a lighter howitzer by the Wehrmacht that must also be ready as soon as possible and capable of rapid production. This requirement was met by mounting the barrel of the leFH 18M on the carriage for a 7.5 cm PaK 40 antitank gun. The new carriage used torsion bars running the full length of the carriage to suspend the wheels. The original wheels of the PaK 40 mounting were too small for use by the howitzer and were replaced by larger pressed-steel wheels with solid rubber tires. The new mounting increased the rate of fire as well as making the howitzer somewhat lighter. The leFH 18/40 shared the different muzzle brakes used by the leFH 18M.

=== M18/49 ===
After World War II, Czechoslovakia modified the design, replacing the spoked wheels with solid wheels and pneumatic tires intead of solid rubber tires. before pressing it into service under the M18/49 designation. These guns were towed by a Praga V3S 6×6 or a Tatra 111R 6×6 truck and were kept in strategic reserve as late as 1981.

== Users ==
- Austria
- Biafra
- Bulgaria
- Czechoslovakia − M18/49, kept in strategic reserve as late 1981
- Finland
- Nazi Germany
- Romania
- Yugoslavia

== See also ==
- 10.5 cm leFH 18
- 10.5 cm leFH 18M

== Sources ==
- Engelmann, Joachim and Scheibert, Horst. Deutsche Artillerie 1934-1945: Eine Dokumentation in Text, Skizzen und Bildern: Ausrüstung, Gliederung, Ausbildung, Führung, Einsatz. Limburg/Lahn, Germany: C. A. Starke, 1974
- Foss, Christopher F. (1981). Artillery of the world (3rd ed.). New York: Charles Scribner's Sons. ISBN 978-0-684-16722-0 – via Internet Archive.
- Gander, Terry and Chamberlain, Peter. Weapons of the Third Reich: An Encyclopedic Survey of All Small Arms, Artillery and Special Weapons of the German Land Forces 1939-1945. New York: Doubleday, 1979 ISBN 0-385-15090-3
- Hogg, Ian V. German Artillery of World War Two. 2nd corrected edition. Mechanicsville, PA: Stackpole Books, 1997 ISBN 1-85367-480-X
