= 10.5 cm leFH 16 =

10.5 cm leichte Feldhaubitze 16
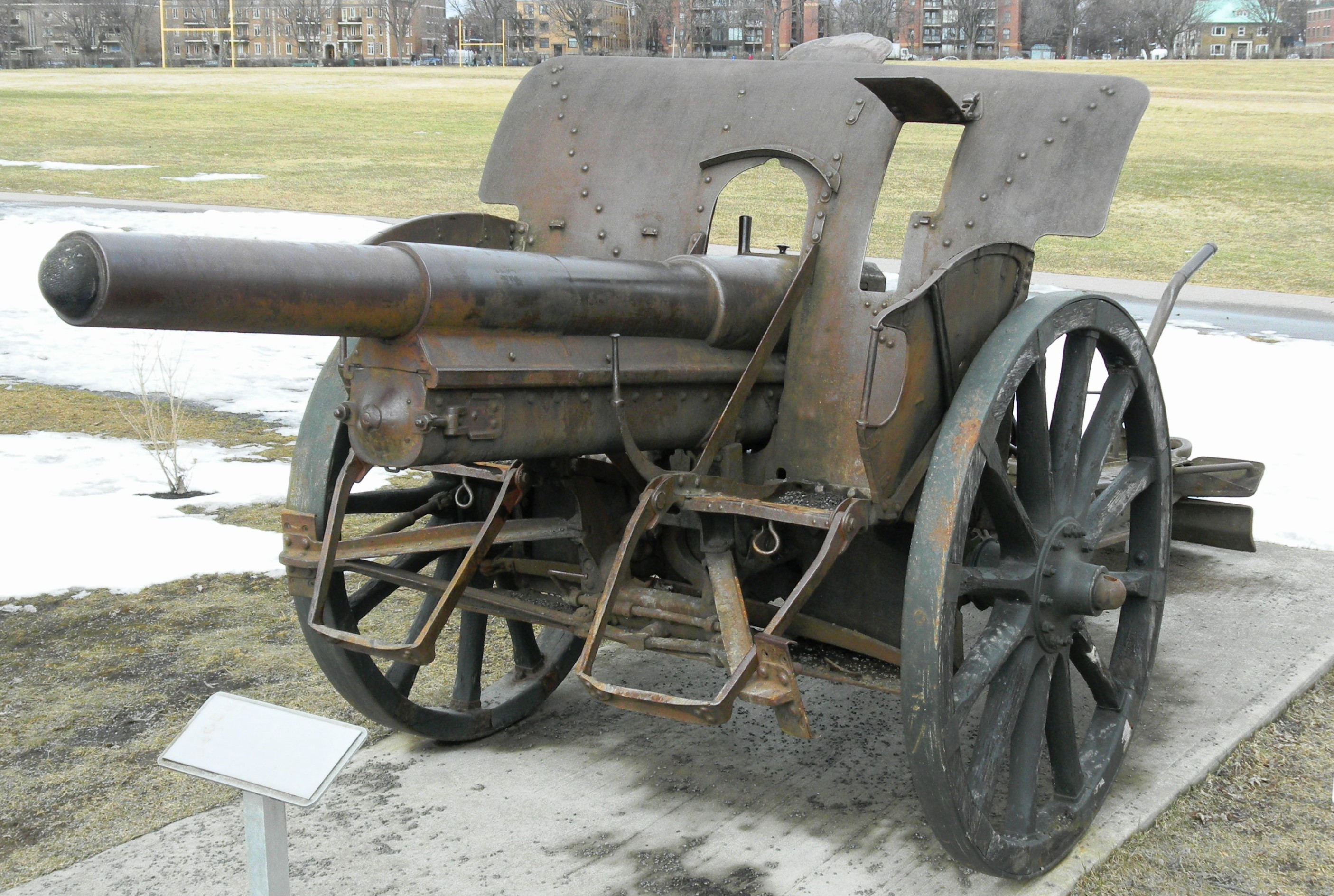
- A leFH 16 captured on 2 September 1918 by the 13th Battalion (Royal Highlanders of Canada), 3rd Infantry Brigade, 1st Canadian Division, Canadian Expeditionary Force (CEF), at Cagnicourt Wood, France.
- Type: Field howitzer
- Place of origin: German Empire

Service history
- In service: 1916–45
- Used by: German Empire; Nazi Germany; Belgium
- Wars: World War I World War II

Production history
- Designer: Rheinmetall
- Designed: 1914–16
- Produced: 1916
- Variants: leFH 16 n.A

Specifications
- Mass: Travel: 2,870 kg (6,330 lb); Combat: 1,525 kg (3,362 lb)
- Length: 5.000 m (16 ft 4.9 in)
- Barrel length: 2.310 m (7 ft 6.9 in) L/22
- Width: 1.650 m (5 ft 5.0 in)
- Height: 1.650 m (5 ft 5.0 in)
- Shell: cased separate-loading (5 charges) 105 x 155mm R
- Shell weight: 14.81 kg (32.7 lb) (HE); 14.25 kg (31.4 lb) (AP)
- Caliber: 105 mm (4.1 in)
- Breech: horizontal sliding-block
- Carriage: box trail
- Elevation: -10° to +40°
- Traverse: 4°
- Rate of fire: 6-8 rpm
- Muzzle velocity: 395 m/s (1,300 ft/s)
- Maximum firing range: 9,225 m (10,089 yd)
- Filling: TNT
- Filling weight: 1.38 kg (3.0 lb)

The 10.5 cm leichte Feldhaubitze 16 (10.5 cm le.FH. 16) was a field howitzer used by Germany in World War I and World War II.

== Description ==
The 10.5 cm leichte Feldhaubitze 16 was introduced in 1916 as a successor to 10.5 cm Feldhaubitze 98/09, featuring a longer barrel and hence longer range. It had the same carriage as the 7.7 cm FK 16.

== Post war ==
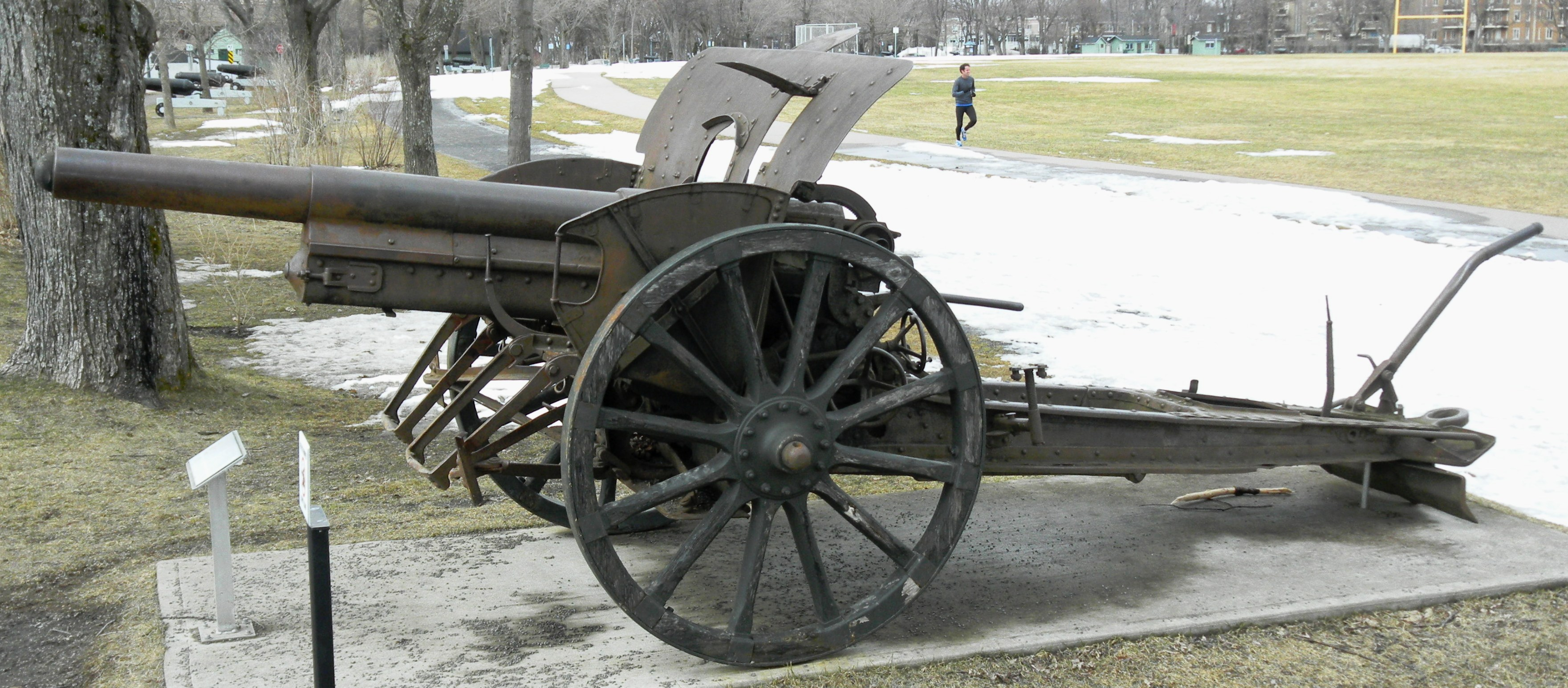
10.5 cm leFH 16 from the side

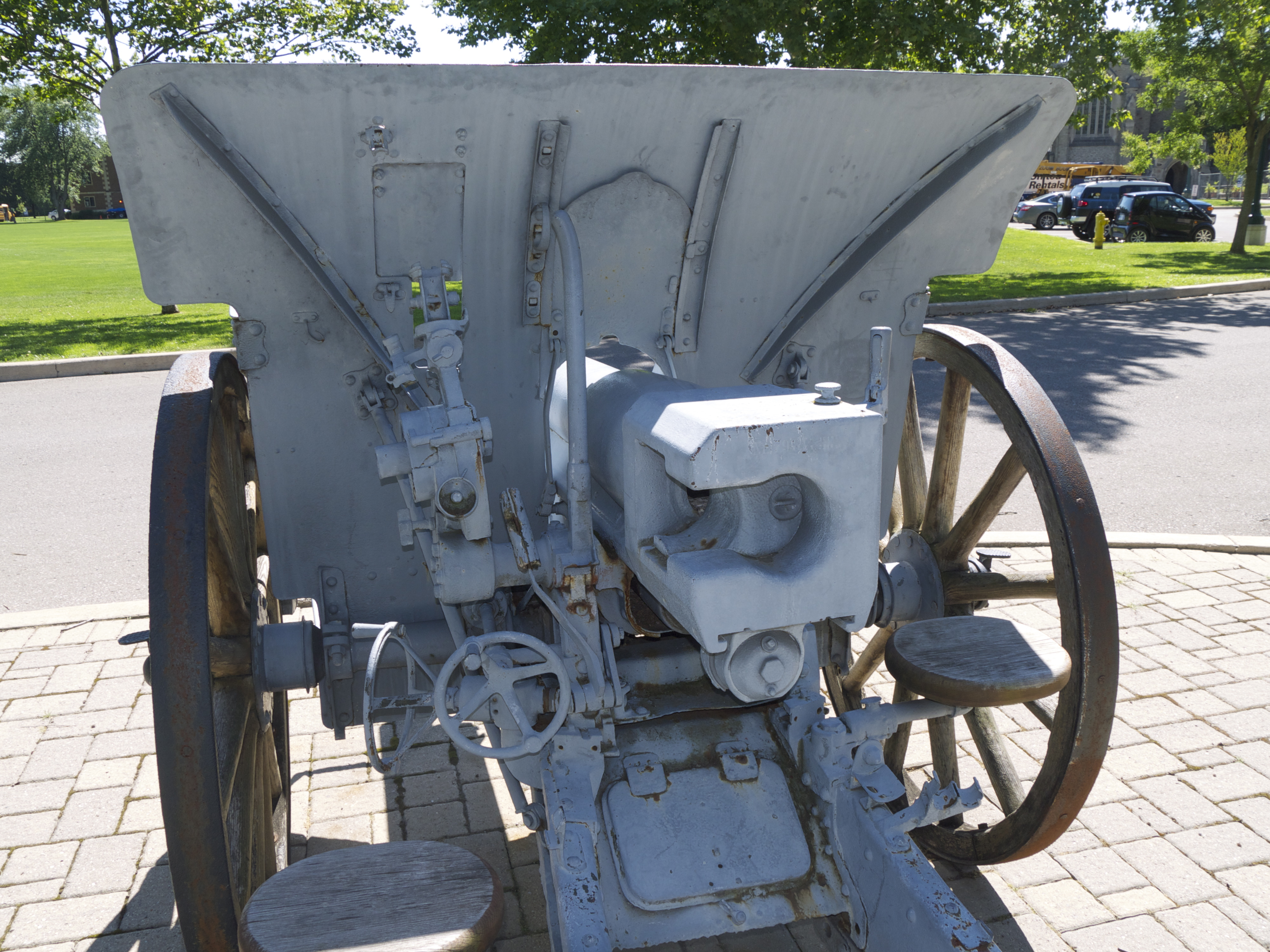
Rear of 10.5 cm leFH 16

The Treaty of Versailles limited the Reichswehr to only 84 light field howitzers, with 800 rounds of ammunition per gun. The leFH 16 remained the standard German howitzer until 1937, when the 10.5 cm leFH 18 began to replace them in the artillery battalions. Guns turned over to Belgium as reparations after World War I were taken into German Army service after the conquest of Belgium as the 10.5 cm le.FH. 327(b). Romania acquired around 64 pieces from the German Army following World War I, and put them into service during the interwar years.
