= Howitzer =

Type of artillery piece

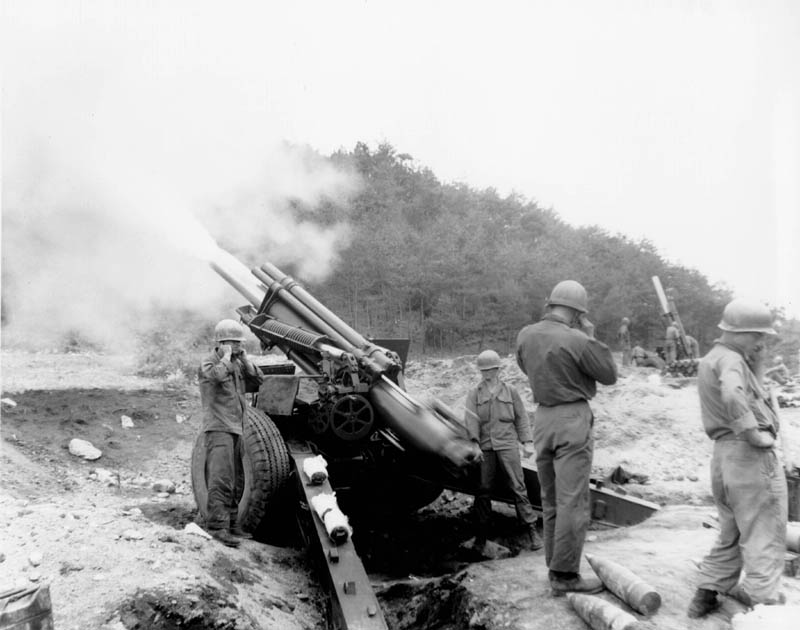
- Firing of a 155 mm howitzer by the 90th Field Artillery Battalion, US 24th Infantry Division, during the Korean War in June 1951
- Type: Artillery

Specifications
- Barrels: 1
- Effective firing range: Varies by model
- Maximum firing range: Typically several kilometers to tens of kilometers

The howitzer (/ˈhaʊ.ɪtsər/) is an artillery weapon that falls between a cannon (or field gun) and a mortar. It is capable of both low angle fire like a field gun and high angle fire like a mortar, given the distinction between low and high angle fire breaks at 40 degrees, also referred to as its equivalent 800 mils (milliradians). With their long-range capabilities, howitzers can be used to great effect in a battery formation with other artillery pieces, such as long-barreled guns, mortars, and rocket artillery. Howitzers were valued for their ability to fire explosive shells and incendiary materials into fortifications.

Throughout the 18th and 19th centuries, howitzers evolved to become more mobile and versatile. The introduction of rifling in the mid-19th century led to significant changes in howitzer design and usage. By the early 20th century, howitzers were classified into different categories based on their size and role, including field howitzers, siege howitzers, super-heavy siege howitzers, and defense howitzers.

During World War I and World War II, howitzers played significant roles in combat, particularly in trench warfare and artillery-heavy strategies such as the Soviet deep battle doctrine. In modern times, the distinctions between guns and howitzers have become less pronounced, with many artillery pieces combining characteristics of both. Contemporary howitzers are often self-propelled, mounted on tracked or wheeled vehicles, and capable of firing at high angles with adjustable propellant charges for increased range and accuracy.

== Etymology ==
The English word howitzer comes from the Czech word houfnice, from houf, 'crowd', and houf is in turn a borrowing from the Middle High German word Hūfe or Houfe (modern German Haufen), meaning 'crowd, throng', plus the Czech nominal suffix -nice. Haufen, sometimes in the compound Gewalthaufen, also designated a pike square formation in German.

In the Hussite Wars of the 1420s and 1430s, the Hussites used short-barreled houfnice cannons to fire at short distances into crowds of infantry, or into charging heavy cavalry, to make horses shy away. The word was rendered into German as aufeniz in the earliest attested use in a document dating from 1440; later German renderings include haussnitz and, eventually haubitze, from which derive the Scandinavian haubits, Polish and Croatian haubica, Estonian haubits, Finnish haupitsi, Russian gaubitsa (гаубица), Serbian haubica (xаубицa), Ukrainian haubytsia (гаубиця), Italian obice, Spanish obús, Portuguese obus, French obusier, Romanian obuzier and the Dutch word houwitser, which led to the English word howitzer.

Since World War I, the word howitzer has been changing to describe artillery pieces that previously would have belonged to the category of gun-howitzers – relatively long barrels and high muzzle velocities combined with multiple propelling charges and high maximum elevations. This is particularly true in the armed forces of the United States, where gun-howitzers have been officially described as howitzers since World War II. Because of this practice, the word howitzer is used in some armies as a generic term for any kind of artillery piece that is designed to attack targets using indirect fire. Thus, artillery pieces that bear little resemblance to howitzers of earlier eras are now described as howitzers, although the British call them guns.

The British had a further method of nomenclature. In the 18th century, they adopted projectile weight for guns replacing an older naming system (such as culverin, saker, etc.) that had developed in the late 15th century. Mortars had been categorized by caliber in inches in the 17th century, and this was duplicated with howitzers.

U.S. military doctrine defines howitzers as any cannon artillery capable of both high-angle fire (45° to 90° elevation) and low-angle fire (0° to 45° elevation); guns are defined as being only capable of low-angle fire (0° to 45° elevation); and mortars are defined as being only capable of high-angle fire (45° to 90° elevation).

== History ==
=== Early modern period ===
The first artillery identified as howitzers developed in the late 16th century as a medium-trajectory weapon between the low trajectory (direct fire) of cannons and the high trajectory (indirect fire) of mortars. Originally intended for use in siege warfare, they were particularly useful for delivering cast iron shells filled with gunpowder or incendiary materials into the interior of fortifications. In contrast to contemporaneous mortars, which were fired at a fixed angle and were entirely dependent on adjustments to the size of propellant charges to vary range, howitzers could be fired at a wide variety of angles. Thus, while howitzer gunnery was more complicated than the technique of employing mortars, the howitzer was an inherently more flexible weapon that could fire its projectiles along a wide range of trajectories.

Mountain howitzer firing

In the middle of the 18th century, a number of European armies began to introduce howitzers that were mobile enough to accompany armies in the field. Though usually fired at the relatively high angles of fire used by contemporary siege howitzers, these field howitzers were rarely defined by this capability. Rather, as the field guns of the day were usually restricted to inert projectiles (which relied entirely on momentum for their destructive effects), the field howitzers of the 18th century were chiefly valued for their ability to fire explosive shells. Many, for the sake of simplicity and rapidity of fire, dispensed with adjustable propellant charges.

The Abus gun was an early form of howitzer in the Ottoman Empire. In 1758, the Russian Empire introduced a specific type of howitzer (or rather gun-howitzer), with a conical chamber, called a licorne, which remained in service for the next 100 years. In the mid-19th century, some armies attempted to simplify their artillery parks by introducing smoothbore artillery pieces that were designed to fire both explosive projectiles and cannonballs, thereby replacing both field howitzers and field guns. The most famous of these "gun-howitzers" was the Canon obusier de 12, a weapon of French design that was extensively used in the American Civil War as the M1857 12-pounder Napoleon.

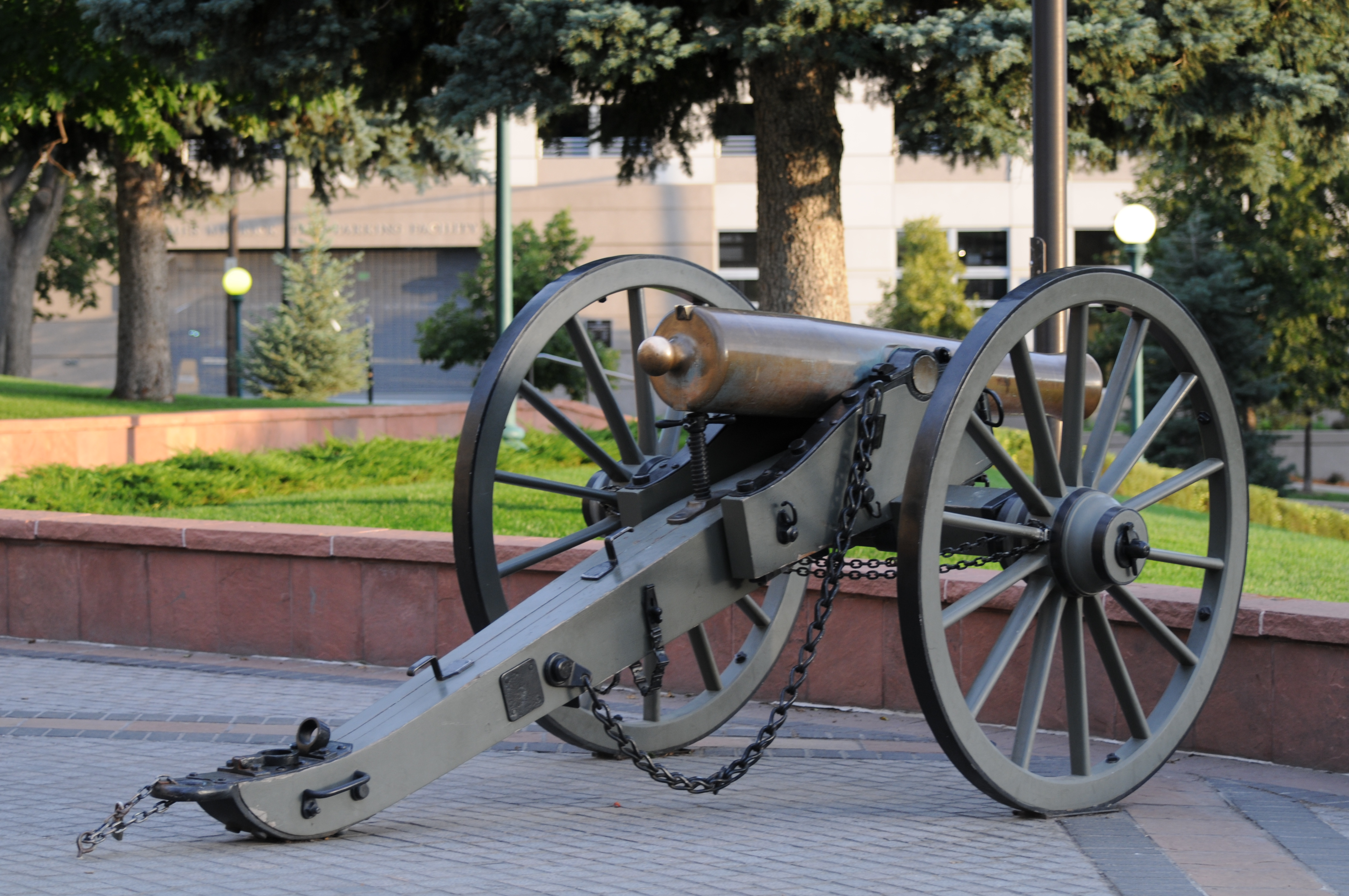
12-pound Napoleon at the Colorado State Capitol

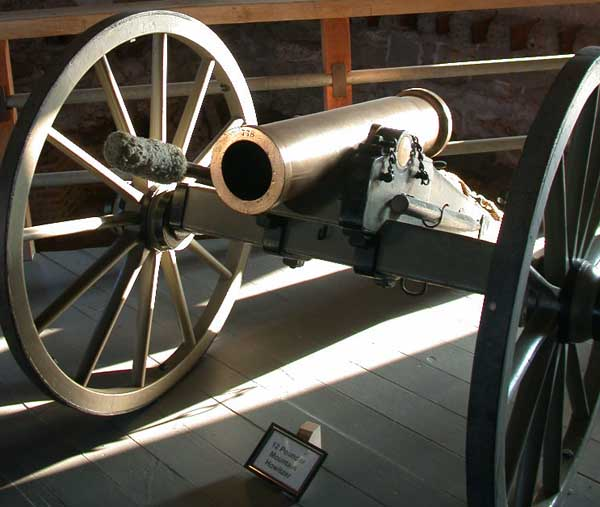
Nineteenth-century 12-pounder (5 kg) mountain howitzer displayed by the National Park Service at Fort Laramie in Wyoming, United States

In 1859, the armies of Europe (including those that had recently adopted gun-howitzers) began to rearm field batteries with rifled field guns. These field pieces used cylindrical projectiles that, while smaller in caliber than the spherical shells of smoothbore field howitzers, could carry a comparable charge of gunpowder. Moreover, their greater range let them create many of the same effects (such as firing over low walls) that previously required the sharply curved trajectories of smoothbore field howitzers. Because of this, military authorities saw no point in obtaining rifled field howitzers to replace their smoothbore counterparts but instead used rifled field guns to replace both guns and howitzers.

In siege warfare, the introduction of rifling had the opposite effect. In the 1860s, artillery officers discovered that rifled siege howitzers (substantially larger than field howitzers) were a more efficient means of destroying walls (particularly walls protected by certain kinds of intervening obstacles) than smoothbore siege guns or siege mortars. Thus, at the same time armies were taking howitzers of one sort out of their field batteries, they were introducing howitzers of another sort into their siege trains and fortresses. The lightest of these weapons (later known as "light siege howitzers") had calibers around 150 mm (5.9 in) and fired shells that weighed between 40 and 50 kg (88 and 110 lb). The heaviest (later called "medium siege howitzers") had calibers between 200 and 220 mm (7.9 and 8.7 in) and fired shells that weighed about 100 kg (220 lb).

During the 1880s, a third type of siege howitzer was added to inventories of a number of European armies. With calibers that ranged between 240 and 270 mm (9.4 and 10.6 in) and shells that weighed more than 150 kg (330 lb), these soon came to be known as "heavy siege howitzers". A good example of a weapon of this class is provided by the 9.45-inch (240 mm) weapon that the British Army purchased from the Skoda works in 1899.

=== 20th century ===
In the early 20th century, the introduction of howitzers that were significantly larger than the heavy siege howitzers of the day made necessary the creation of a fourth category, that of "super-heavy siege howitzers". Weapons of this category include the famous Big Bertha of the German Army and the 15-inch (381 mm) howitzer of the British Royal Marine Artillery. These large howitzers were transported mechanically rather than by teams of horses. They were transported as several loads and had to be assembled at their firing position.

Field howitzers introduced at the end of the 19th century could fire shells with high trajectories giving a steep angle of descent and, as a result, could strike targets that were protected by intervening obstacles. They could also fire shells that were about twice as large as shells fired by guns of the same size. Thus, while a 75 mm (3.0 in) field gun that weighed one ton or so was limited to shells that weigh around 8 kg (18 lb), a 105 mm (4.1 in) howitzer of the same weight could fire 15 kg (33 lb) shells. This is a matter of fundamental mechanics affecting the stability and hence the weight of the carriage.

As heavy field howitzers and light siege howitzers of the late 19th and early 20th centuries used ammunition of the same size and type, there was a marked tendency for the two types to merge. At first, this was largely a matter of the same basic weapon being employed on two different mountings. Later, as on-carriage recoil-absorbing systems eliminated many of the advantages that siege platforms had enjoyed over field carriages, the same combination of barrel assembly, recoil mechanism and carriage was used in both roles.

By the early 20th century, the differences between guns and howitzers were relative, not absolute, and generally recognized as follows:

- Guns – higher velocity and longer range, single charge propellant, maximum elevation generally less than 45 degrees.
- Howitzers – lower velocity and shorter range, multi-charge propellant, maximum elevation typically more than 45 degrees.

The onset of trench warfare after the first few months of World War I greatly increased the demand for howitzers that gave a steep angle of descent, which were better suited than guns to the task of striking targets in a vertical plane (such as trenches), with large amounts of explosive and considerably less barrel wear. The German army was well equipped with howitzers, having far more at the beginning of the war than France.

Many howitzers introduced in the course of World War I had longer barrels than pre-war howitzers. The standard German light field howitzer at the start of the war (the 10.5 cm leichte Feldhaubitze 98/09) had a barrel that was 16 calibers long, but the light field howitzer adopted by the German Army in 1916 (105 mm leichte Feldhaubitze 16) had a barrel that was 22 calibers long. At the same time, new models of field gun introduced during that conflict, such as the 77 mm (3.0 in) field gun adopted by the German Army in 1916 (7.7 cm Feldkanone 16) were often provided with carriages that allowed firing at comparatively high angles, and adjustable propellant cartridges.

In the years after World War I, the tendency of guns and howitzers to acquire each other's characteristics led to the renaissance of the concept of the gun-howitzer. This was a product of technical advances such as the French invention of autofrettage just before World War I, which led to stronger and lighter barrels, the use of cut-off gear to control recoil length depending on firing elevation angle, and the invention of muzzle brakes to reduce recoil forces. Like the gun-howitzers of the 19th century, those of the 20th century replaced both guns and howitzers. Thus, the 25-pounder "gun-howitzer" of the British Army replaced both the 18-pounder field gun and the 4.5-inch howitzer.

During World War II, the military doctrine of Soviet deep battle called for extensive use of heavy artillery to hold the formal line of front. Soviet doctrine was remarkably different from the German doctrine of Blitzkrieg and called for a far more extensive use of artillery. As a result, howitzers saw most of the action on the Eastern front. Most of the howitzers produced by the USSR at the time were not self-propelled. Notable examples of Soviet howitzers include the M-10, M-30 and D-1.

Since World War II, most of the artillery pieces adopted by armies for attacking targets on land have combined the traditional characteristics of guns and howitzers – high muzzle velocity, long barrels, long range, multiple charges and maximum elevation angles greater than 45 degrees. The term "gun-howitzer" is sometimes used for these (e.g., in Russia); many nations use "howitzer", while the UK (and most members of The Commonwealth of Nations) calls them "guns", for example Gun, 105 mm, Field, L118.

== Types ==
- A self-propelled howitzer is mounted on a tracked or wheeled motor vehicle. In many cases, it is protected by some sort of armor so that it superficially resembles a tank. This armor is designed primarily to protect the crew from shrapnel and small arms fire, not anti-armor weapons.
- A pack howitzer is a relatively light howitzer that is designed to be easily broken down into several pieces, each of which is small enough to be carried by mule or pack-horse.
- A mountain howitzer is a relatively light howitzer designed for use in mountainous terrain. Most, but not all, mountain howitzers are also pack howitzers.
- A siege howitzer is a howitzer that is designed to be fired from a mounting on a fixed platform of some sort.
- A field howitzer is a howitzer that is mobile enough to accompany a field army on campaign. It is invariably provided with a wheeled carriage of some sort.

== Gallery ==
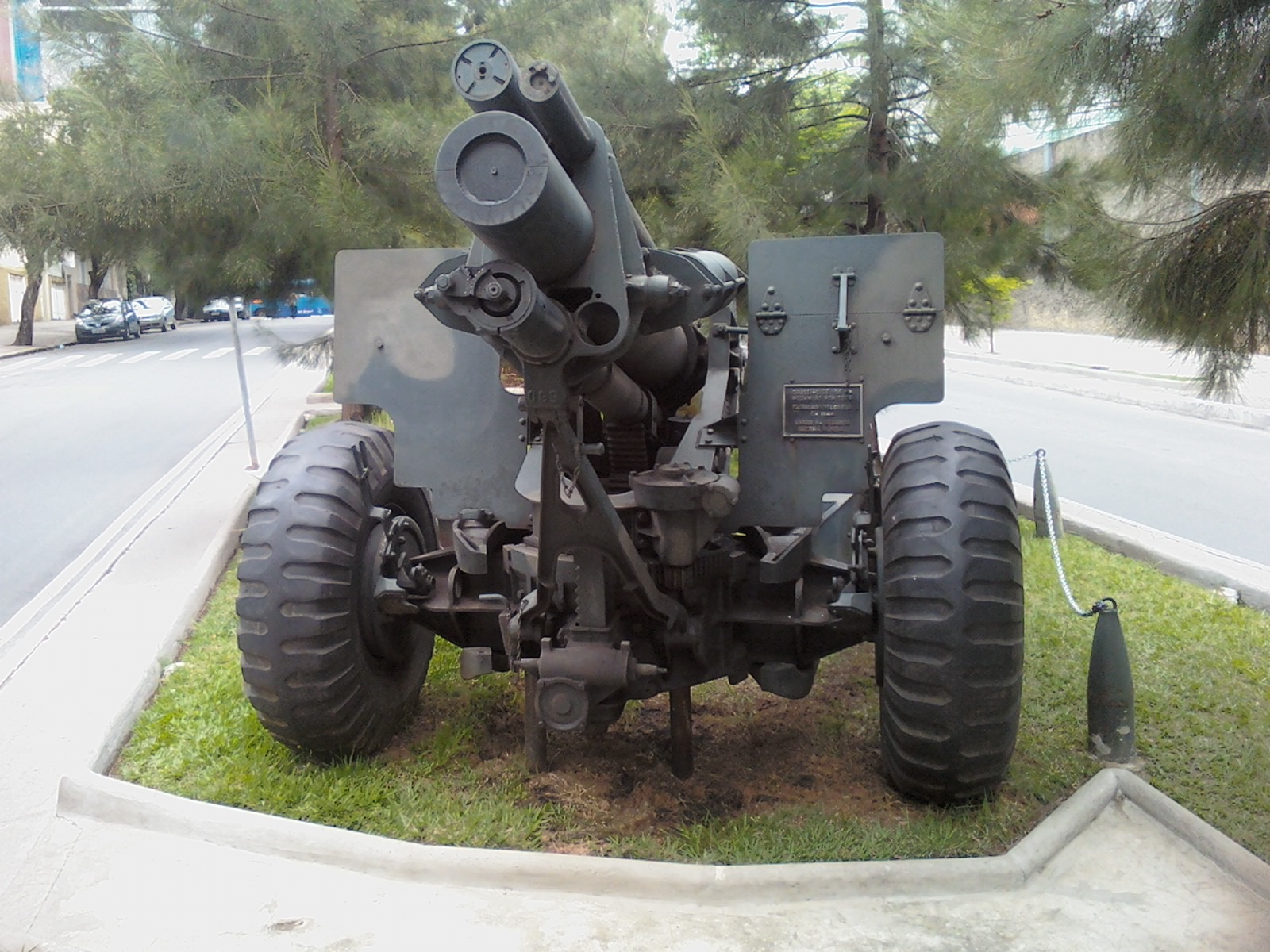
M114 155 mm howitzer, Brazil

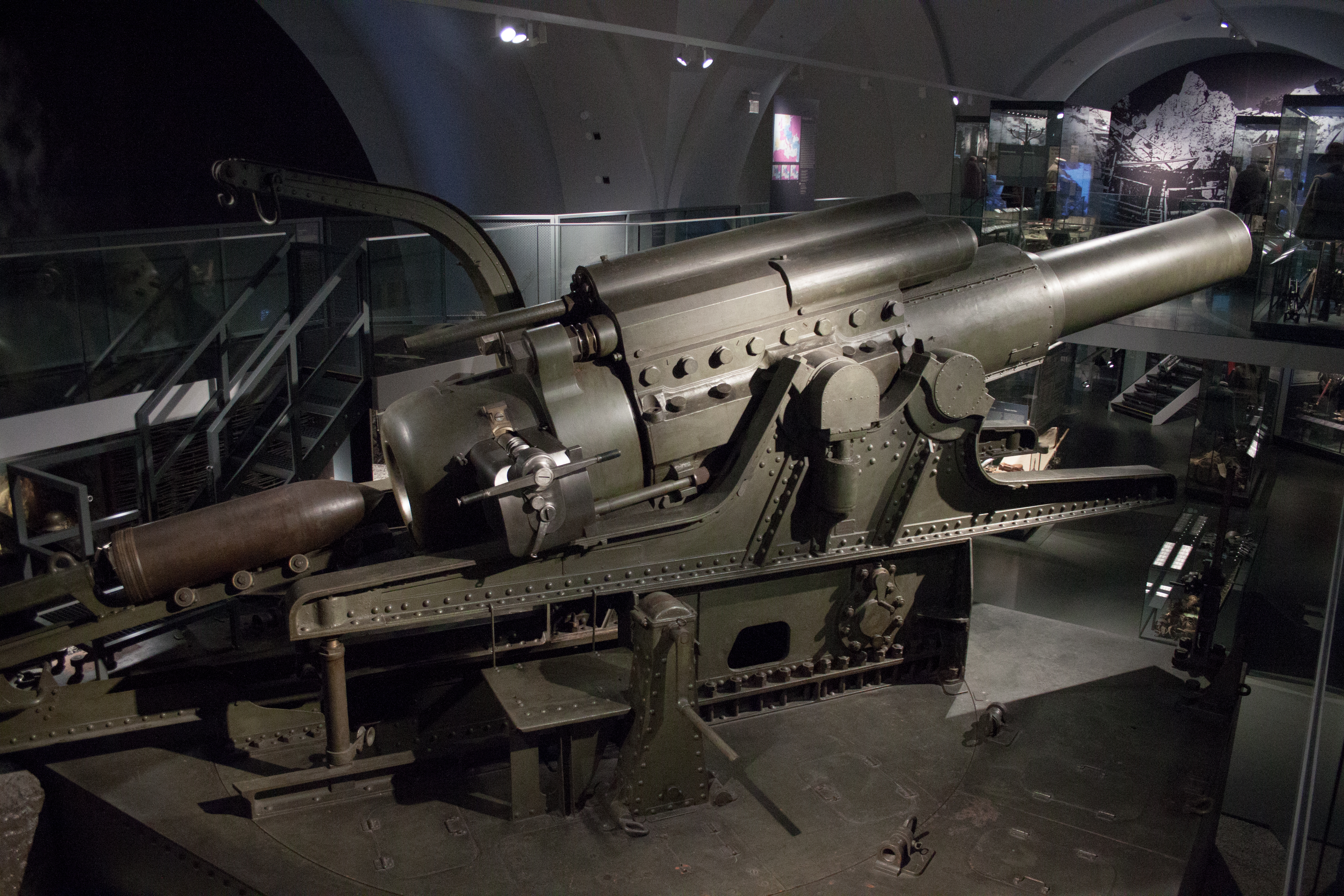
38 cm siege howitzer, Austria Hungary 1916, in the Heeresgeschichtliches Museum, Vienna

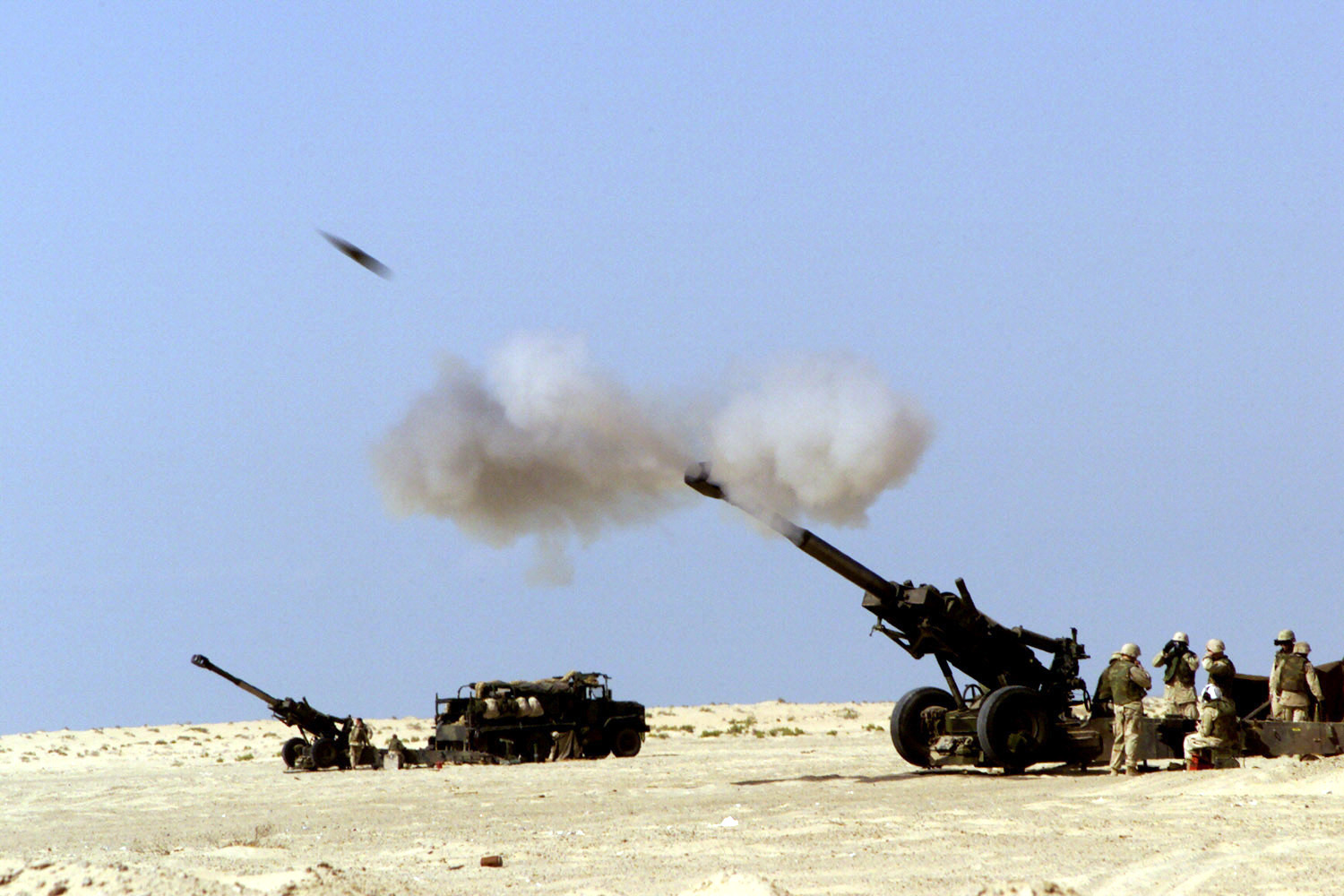
U.S. M198 gun-howitzer

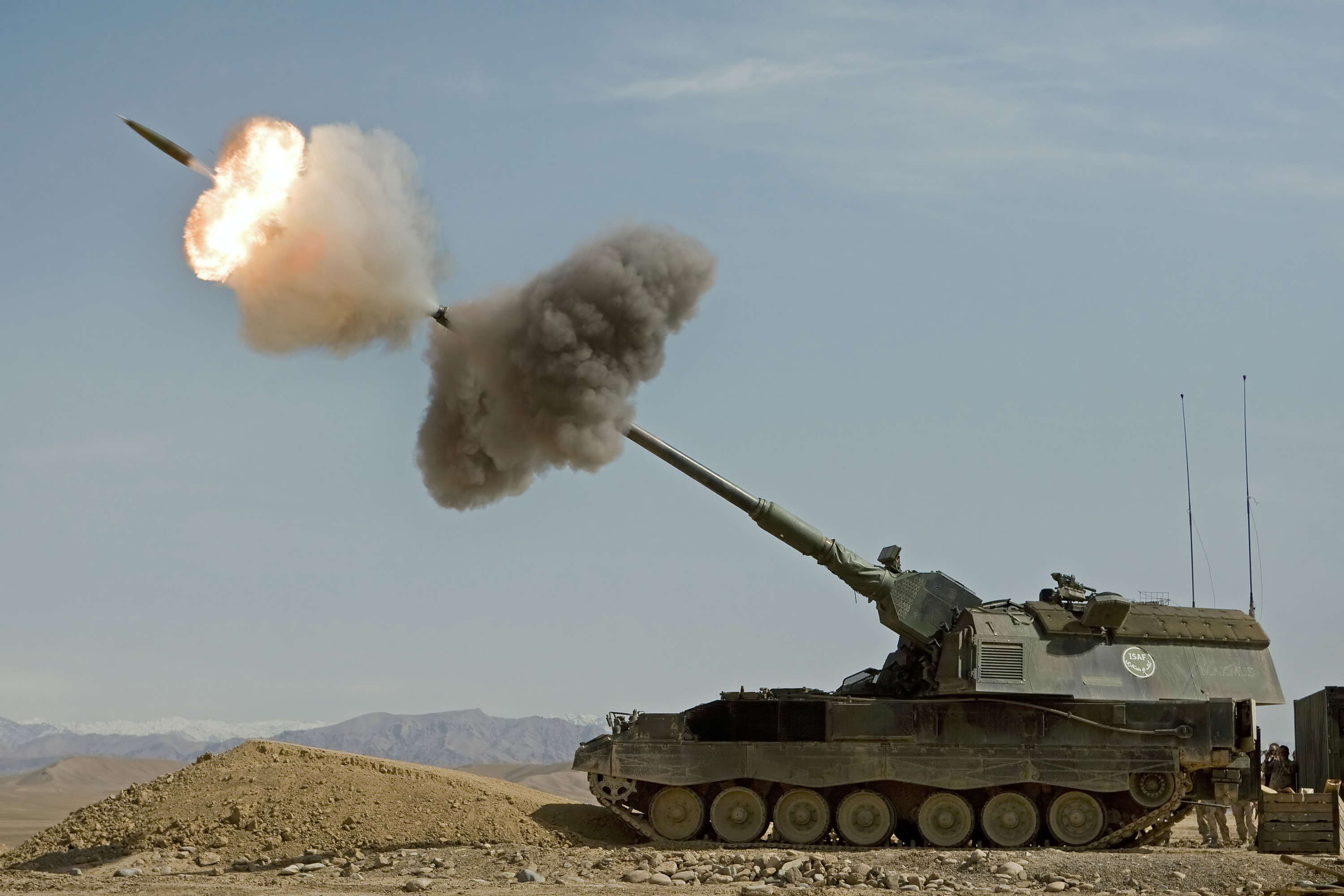
Dutch Panzerhaubitze 2000 firing

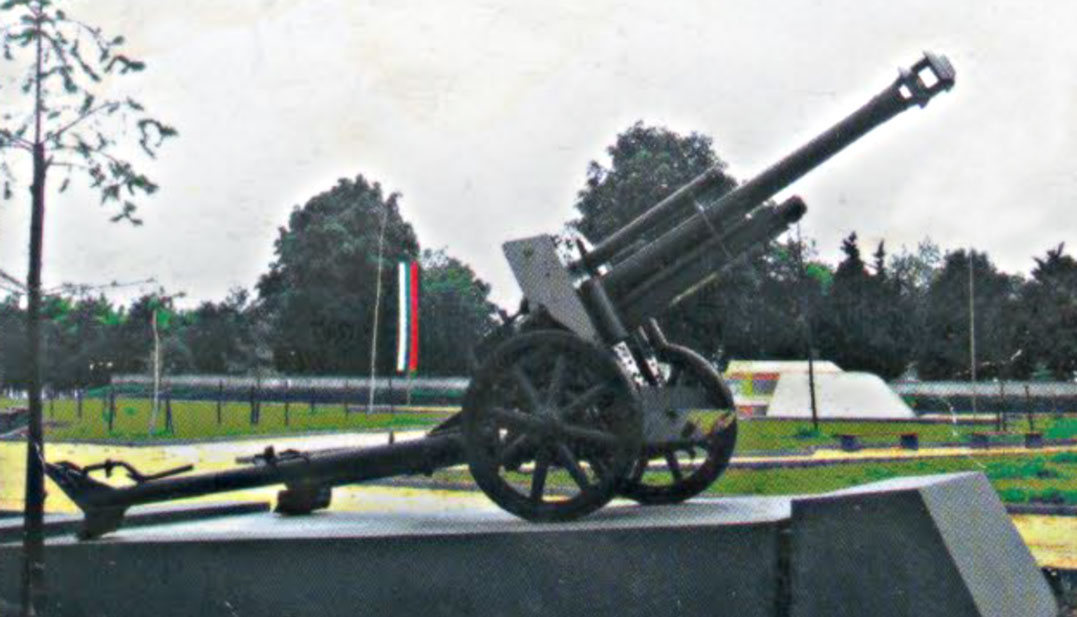
German 10.5 cm leFH 18/40 howitzer, monument at the Battle of Turtucaia

Demonstration of a British 25-pounder firing

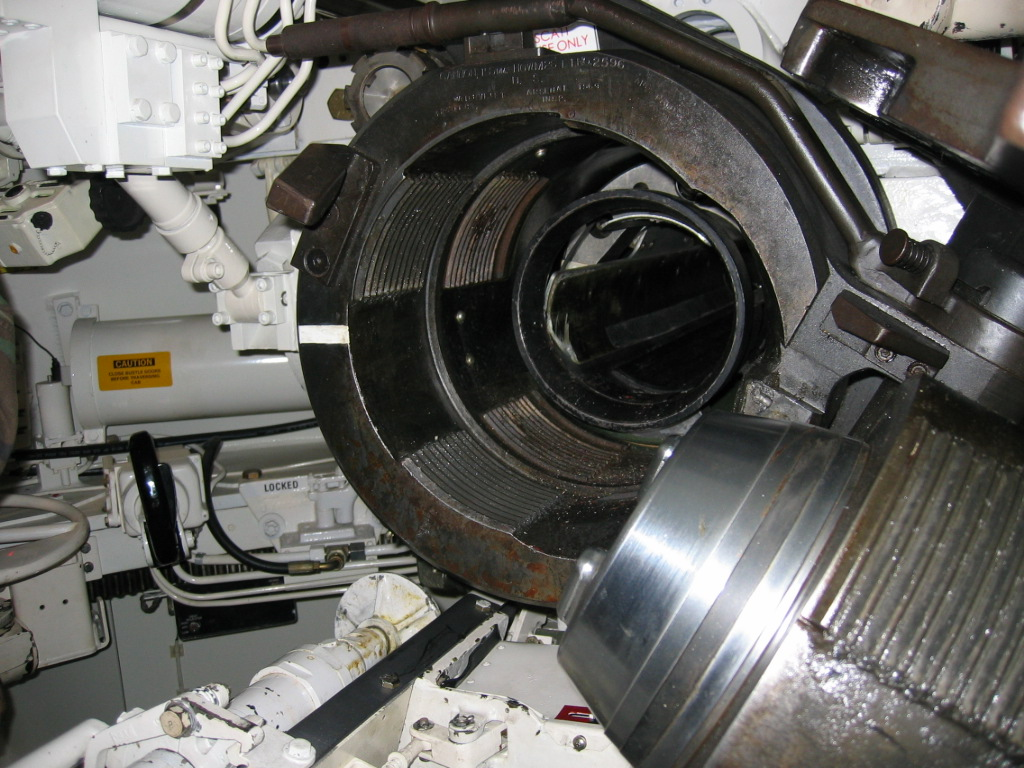
Breech of a U.S. M109 self-propelled gun-howitzer

== See also ==
- 12-inch coast defense mortar – American artillery
- 2B9 Vasilek
- List of howitzers
- Plunging fire – Indirect gunfire fired at a high angle trajectory to fall on to a target or enemy
