= Schwerer Wehrmachtschlepper =

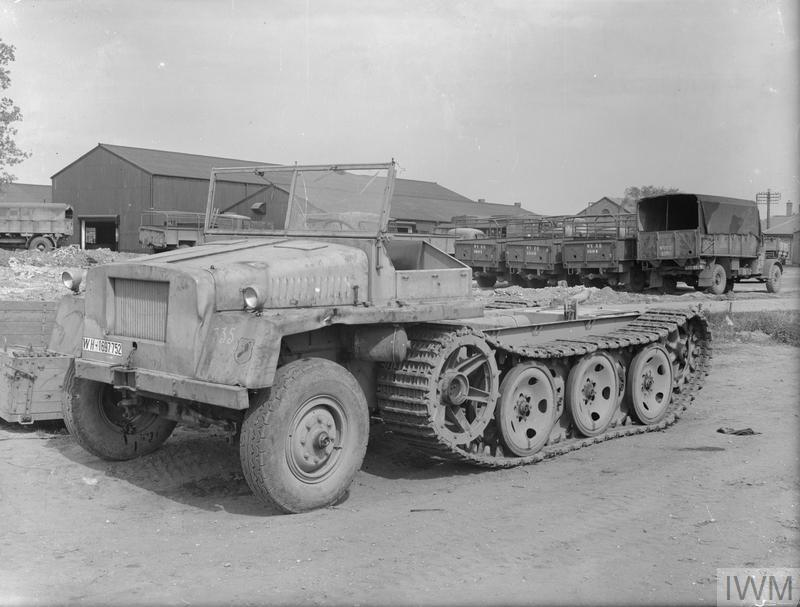
- Type: Half-track
- Place of origin: Nazi Germany

Service history
- In service: 1944—1945
- Used by: Nazi Germany
- Wars: World War II

Production history
- Designer: Büssing-NAG
- Designed: 1942—1943
- Manufacturer: Büssing-NAG, Tatra
- Produced: 1943—1945
- No. built: 825
- Variants: 15 cm Panzerwerfer auf sWS; 3.7cm FlaK 43 auf sWS

Specifications
- Mass: 13.5 tonnes (14.9 short tons; 13.3 long tons)
- Length: 6.92 m (22 ft 8 in)
- Width: 2.5 m (8 ft 2 in)
- Height: 2.07 m (6 ft 9 in)
- Crew: 2
- Armor: 6-15 mm (certain models only)
- Engine: 4.198 L (256.2 cu in) gasoline inline 6 cylinder, water-cooled Maybach HL42 TRKMS; 100 hp (75 kW)
- Payload capacity: 4,000 kg (8,800 lb)
- Transmission: ZF kb 40D
- Suspension: transverse leaf-spring and torsion bar
- Ground clearance: 46.5 cm (18.3 in)
- Fuel capacity: 240 L (53 imp gal; 63 US gal)
- Operational range: 300 km (190 mi)
- Maximum speed: 27.4 km/h (17.0 mph)

The Schwerer Wehrmachtschlepper (sWS; "Heavy Military Tractor") was a German World War II half-track vehicle used in various roles between 1943 and 1945. The unarmored models were used as supply vehicles and as tractors to haul artillery. Armored versions mounted anti-aircraft guns or a 10 barrel rocket launcher (Nebelwerfer). Fewer than a thousand were built before the end of the war, but production continued after the war of an improved model in the Tatra plant in Czechoslovakia.

== History ==
On 7 May 1942 Hitler ordered development of a simple, low-speed, half-track, load-carrying vehicle for use on the Eastern Front. Büssing-NAG was selected to develop a new 5 t (4.9 long tons; 5.5 short tons) tractor (Zgkw. 5t neuer Art) to replace the earlier 5 tonne Sd.Kfz. 6 and 3 t (3.0 long tons; 3.3 short tons) Sd.Kfz. 11 half-tracks, as well as the various lesser-known vehicles of the same class. Production started in December 1943 at Büssing-NAG. Early examples used a truck-like, unarmored cabin similar to the earlier half-tracks it replaced, while later examples featured an armored cabin and engine compartment that looked similar to the Sd.Kfz. 251 armored personnel carrier. Like the earlier Demag-designed Sd.Kfz. 10, the sWS's suspension system consisted of five double roadwheels per side, overlapping and interleaved in the Schachtellaufwerk layout, mounted on swing arms sprung by torsion bars. One idler wheel, mounted at the rear end of each track unit, was used to control track tension.

Tatra also joined in production, but together both factories produced only 825 vehicles in total. Tatra continued production of an improved vehicle after the war as the T809.

In addition to the basic cargo role, the vehicle was adapted as a mount both for the medium 3.7 cm FlaK 43 anti-aircraft gun and the quadruple 20mm flak gun. These mounts were placed at the center of the cargo area with a large gun shield. The sides of the cargo compartment folded down to give the crew more room to serve the weapons. Ammunition was carried at the rear of the cargo area. Another modification was the Panzerwerfer 42 auf sWS, a 10-barreled 15 cm (5.9 in) Nebelwerfer 42 rocket launcher placed over an armored ammunition storage compartment; it was built over the cargo area that was intended to replace the 15 cm Panzerwerfer auf Sf (Sd.Kfz. 4/1), based on the Sd.Kfz. 4 half-track Maultier.

== Armor ==
The Panzerwerfer mount had armor 10 millimetres (0.39 in) thick.

Thickness/slope from the vertical	Front	Side	Rear	Top/Bottom
Gun shield (Flak 43 only)	10 mm (0.39 in)/30°	none	none	none
Superstructure	15 mm (0.59 in)/30°	12 mm (0.47 in)/8°	8 mm (0.31 in)/30°	6 mm (0.24 in)/87°
Hull	15 mm (0.59 in)/15°	12 mm (0.47 in)/15°	8 mm (0.31 in)/0°	6 mm (0.24 in)

== Variants ==
- schweren Wehrmachtsschlepper mit Pritschenaufbau flatbed body, about 770 built
- 3,7 cm Flak 43/1 auf Selbstfahrlafette schwerer Wehrmachtsschlepper mit Behelfspanzerung - sometimes 2cm Flak fitted instead
- 15 cm Panzerwerfer 42 auf Selbstfahrlafette schwerer Wehrmachtsschlepper mit Behelfspanzerung - at least two built by Martini-Hütte in Salzkotten

== See also ==
- Sd.Kfz. 4
- Sd.Kfz. 6
- Sd.Kfz. 7
- Sd.Kfz. 8
- Sd.Kfz. 9
- Sd.Kfz. 10
- Sd.Kfz. 11
- Sd.Kfz. 250
- Sd.Kfz. 251
