= Raupenschlepper Ost =

German light tracked vehicle

Raupenschlepper Ost (RSO)
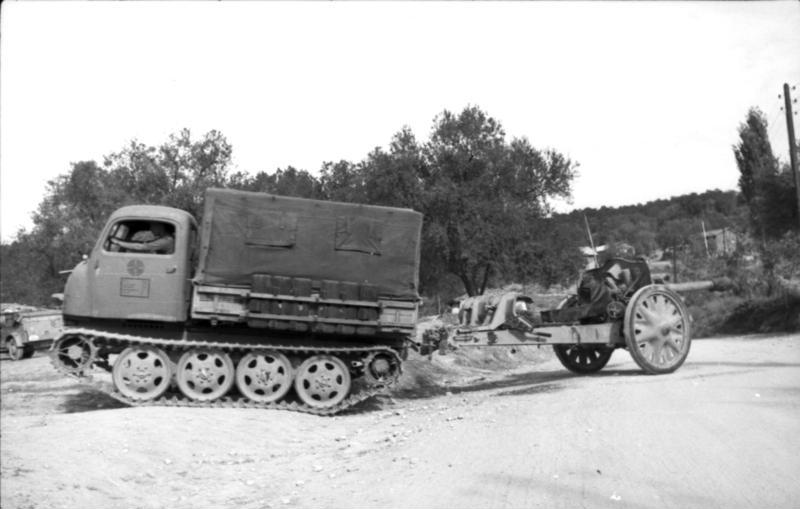
- RSO towing 105 mm howitzer
- Type: Tracked prime mover
- Place of origin: Nazi Germany

Service history
- In service: 1942 — 1945
- Wars: World War II

Production history
- Designed: Mid 1941 — Mid 1942
- Manufacturer: Steyr
- Produced: September 1942 — 1945
- No. built: ~23,000

Specifications
- Mass: 2.5-3 t
- Length: 4.425 m (14 ft 6 in)
- Width: 1.99 m (6 ft 6 in)
- Height: 2.53 m (8 ft 4 in)
- Crew: 2 (including Driver assistant)
- Engine: Steyr V8 3.5l / 8-cylinder Petrol/ 85 PS (RSO/01) 5.5l / 4cyl Deutz diesel / 66 PS (RSO/03); 85/66 PS
- Suspension: 4 quarter-elliptic leaf springs
- Operational range: 300 km (190 mi)
- Maximum speed: 30 km/h (19 mph)

Raupenschlepper Ost (German: "Caterpillar Tractor East", more commonly abbreviated to RSO) was a fully tracked, lightweight vehicle used by the Wehrmacht in World War II. It was conceived in response to the poor performance of wheeled and half-tracked vehicles in the mud and snow during the Wehrmacht's first autumn and winter on the Soviet Front.

The RSO was a contemporary with somewhat similar Allied full-tracked small artillery tractors in use in other armies (such as the Soviet STZ-5 "Stalingradets", and the U.S. Army's M4 tractor), mostly originated from the pre-war light to medium series of Vickers artillery tractors.

Two variants of this vehicle were built: the basic cargo carrier, and a self-propelled antitank vehicle armed with a PaK 40 gun. Both shared the same chassis.

== Cargo carrier variant: RSO ==
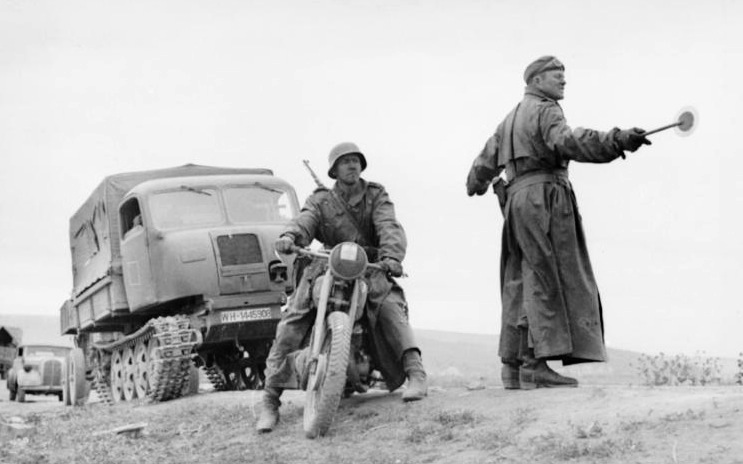
A Raupenschlepper Ost (RSO) in service just before the Kursk offensive in Russia

=== History ===
After the Wehrmacht's first fall and winter (1941–1942) on the Eastern Front, they found that the extremely primitive roadways in the USSR and seasonal mud required a fully tracked supply vehicle to maintain mobility. Steyr responded by proposing a small, fully tracked vehicle based upon its 1.5-tonne (3,300 lb) truck, the Steyr 1500 light truck, already in use in the army. The vehicle was introduced in 1942 as the Raupenschlepper Ost (RSO).

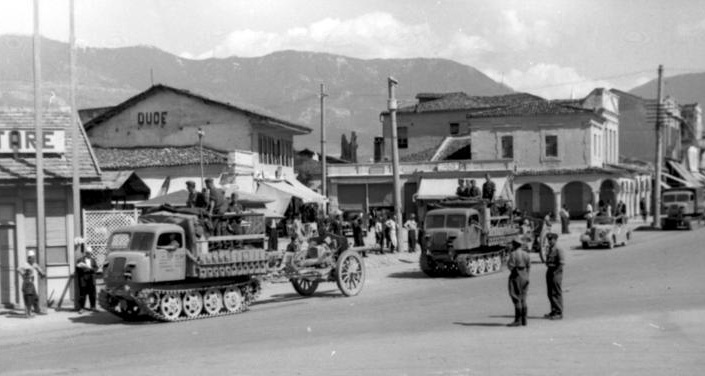
A Raupenschlepper Ost pulling 105 mm howitzer in Skanderbeg Square, Tirana, the capital of Albania, after taking over the city from the Italians, September 1943.

Initially designed as a prime mover and artillery supply vehicle, it eventually served in a wide variety of roles. Immediately after the vehicle reached the Eastern front, the combat units started using it for general transport duties. It gave outstanding service due to its reliability, its ease of maintenance, and its capability to take over a variety of roles—in every kind of terrain—that other vehicles lacked. The four road wheels per side, all in a single line as part of a "slack-track" system with no return rollers, comprised a much simpler suspension system, much more able to handle the rasputitsa mud season and Russian winter conditions, without mud or snow freezing between the wheels of the complex overlapping/interleaved Schachtellaufwerk suspension systems that German half-track vehicles like the Sd.Kfz. 7 possessed. Soon the orders for the RSO surpassed Steyr's production ability, and more manufacturers joined the vehicle's production in order to meet the ever increased demands.

=== Description ===
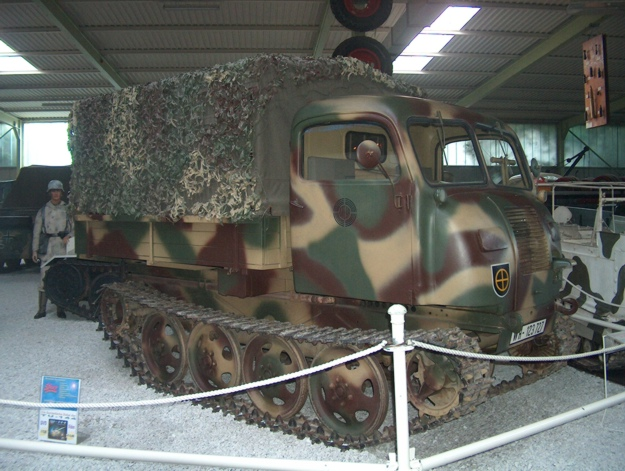
RSO/01, Sinsheim Auto & Technik Museum (2004)

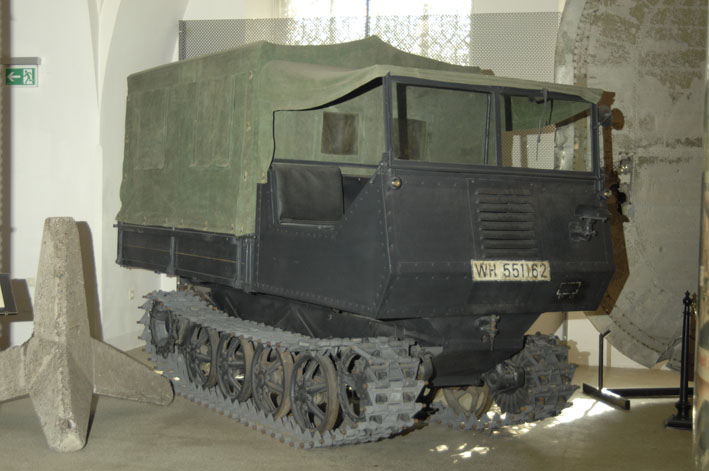
RSO/03, Museum of Military History, Vienna (2010)

The original version had a pressed-steel cab with a truck-like configuration similar to the wheeled trucks. The next two versions – RSO/02 and 03 – had a simpler, soft-top, slab-sided metal cab. All models had wooden, drop-side cargo beds typical of light trucks of the era. It had a ground clearance of 55 cm (22 in) and was originally powered by a Steyr V8 petrol engine of 3.5 L giving 63 kW (85 PS), which in the RSO/03 Magirus-produced vehicles was replaced by a 49 kW (66 PS) Deutz air-cooled diesel engine.

The later model used a Cletrac-type final drive (instead of the automotive-type differential unit used previously) along with many other improvements. The engine was mounted on the floor of the driving cab with the drive taken through a single plate clutch to the transmission. The transmission had four forward gears and one reverse. The suspension consisted of four large pressed-steel disk wheels on each side, mounted in pairs with elliptic springs. Steering involved upright steering levers to four hydraulic brakes on the sprockets and idlers. A spring-loaded pintle was fitted at the rear, and towing hooks were fitted in the front. It had a speed of about 30 kilometres per hour (19 mph).

== Anti-tank variant: RSO/PaK 40 ==
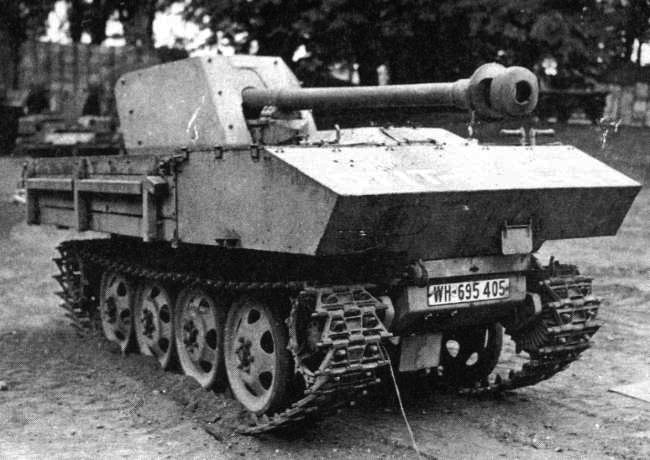
RSO/PaK 40

By 1943 infantry anti-tank units at the front complained strongly that it was almost impossible to move their guns using trucks in daylight under enemy fire, leading to enormous losses of equipment during "emergency relocations" (at the time a euphemism for withdrawal), and their opinions reached the top ranks. OKW explored a previously considered proposal to fit the 75 mm PaK 40/1 anti-tank gun – by then the standard PaK used by the Wehrmacht – on top of an RSO chassis. After seeing the blueprints, Hitler ordered a limited production run for combat testing, before the prototypes were completed.

The project was carried out by Steyr. The suspension of the RSO remained unchanged, but the front driver's compartment was replaced with a low, lightly armoured superstructure. The result was a lightweight, cheap to produce, and highly mobile infantry anti-tank weapon. It was more exposed compared to the conventional, open-topped Panzerjäger style of tank destroyer, which had a construction cost many times that of a RSO/PaK 40.

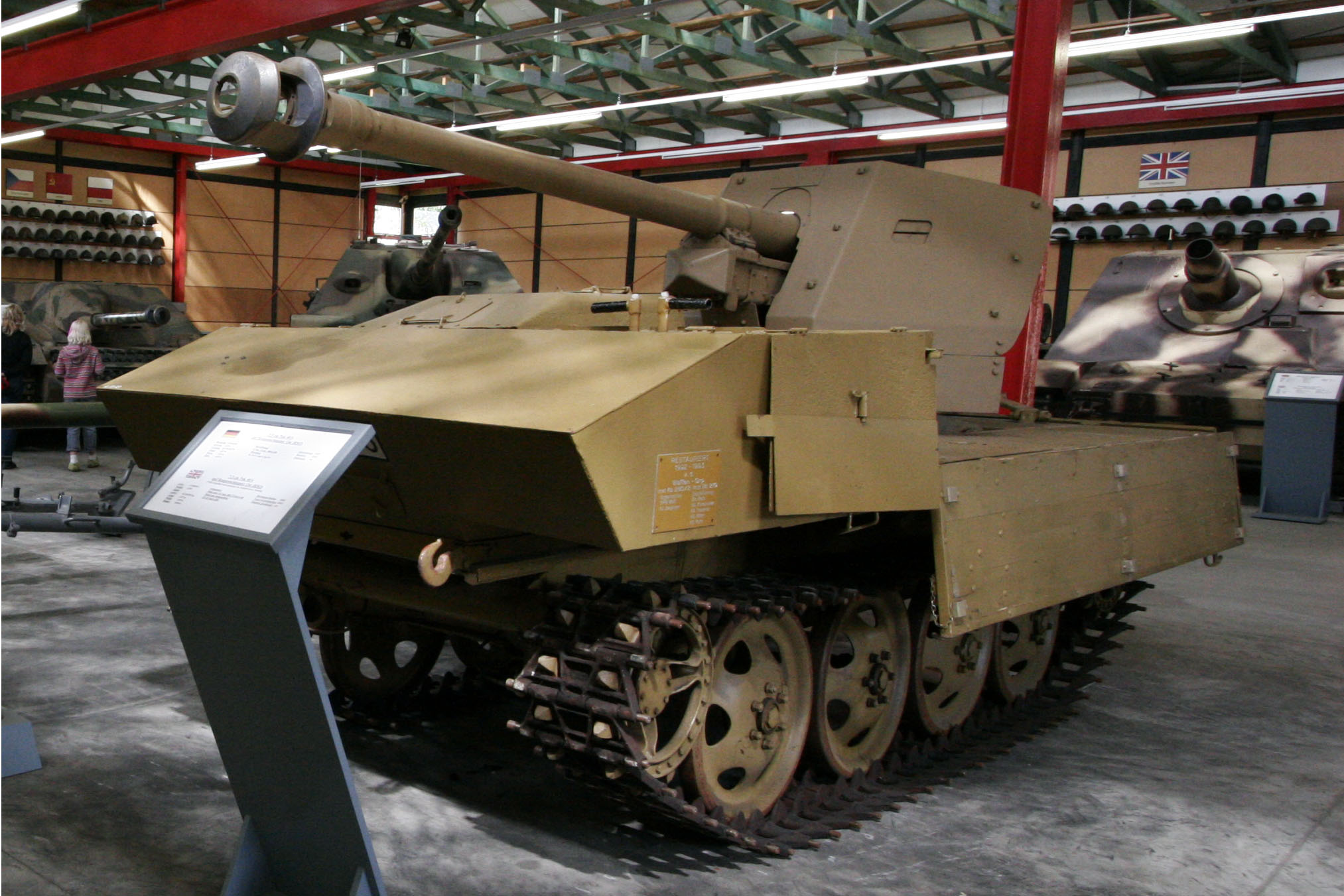
RSO/PaK 40 at the Deutsches Panzermuseum Munster, Germany.

Although the vehicle was intended for use by the infantry anti-tank units, all pre-production vehicles were issued to armoured units (Panzerjäger Abteilungen 743 and 744, and 18th Panzergrenadier Division), due to the urgent need for replacements. Their low speed and light armour inevitably resulted in problems for these units trying to cooperate with those in other fighting vehicles. The German Army Group South, where the units issued for combat testing, declared the vehicle useful, and large-scale production was quickly authorised.

Despite the decision to have Steyr shift its entire production line to the RSO/PaK 40, no specific order arrived, and only the approximately 60 pre-production vehicles were ever manufactured. While the first vehicles were rolled out from the production line, Steyr started testing an improved version that incorporated a wider chassis and tracks; these changes improved cross-country performance and lowered the center of gravity, a problem in a vehicle of such a high ground clearance.

None of the improved version ever reached the front. In October 1943, Steyr was ordered by the Ministry of Munitions to cease production of any type of tracked vehicles. By then a new up-gunned version of the widened chassis had been designed and was planned to enter production in 1944; it had a more powerful and less noisy V8 petrol engine to carry the 88 mm PaK 43 L71 gun, by far the most powerful anti-tank weapon of its era designated Pz.Jäg. K43. It is doubtful any were constructed by the end of the war.

== Production ==
Approximately 23,000 RSO of all versions were produced by Steyr (2,600 pcs), Klöckner-Humboldt-Deutz AG (KHD; 12,500 pcs), Auto Union's Siegmar plant (former Wanderer; 5,600 pcs) and Gräf & Stift (4,500 pcs).

== Operators ==
- Nazi Germany
- Romania — Purchased 100 RSO/01 tractors in 1943. These were used for towing anti-tank guns.
- Finland — Purchased ~30 to 50 RSO/01 tractors in 1944.

== See also ==
- Radschlepper Ost, a large-wheeled tractor, also developed for the Eastern Front
- STZ-5
- The 21st century Bandvagn 206, used in Europe and the Americas
- M29 Weasel
- Schwerer Wehrmachtschlepper
- Sd.Kfz. 4
- Universal Carrier
- C2P tractor
- Renault UE
- Komsomolets armored tractor
