= T34 Calliope =

Tank-mounted rocket launcher

Sherman Calliope
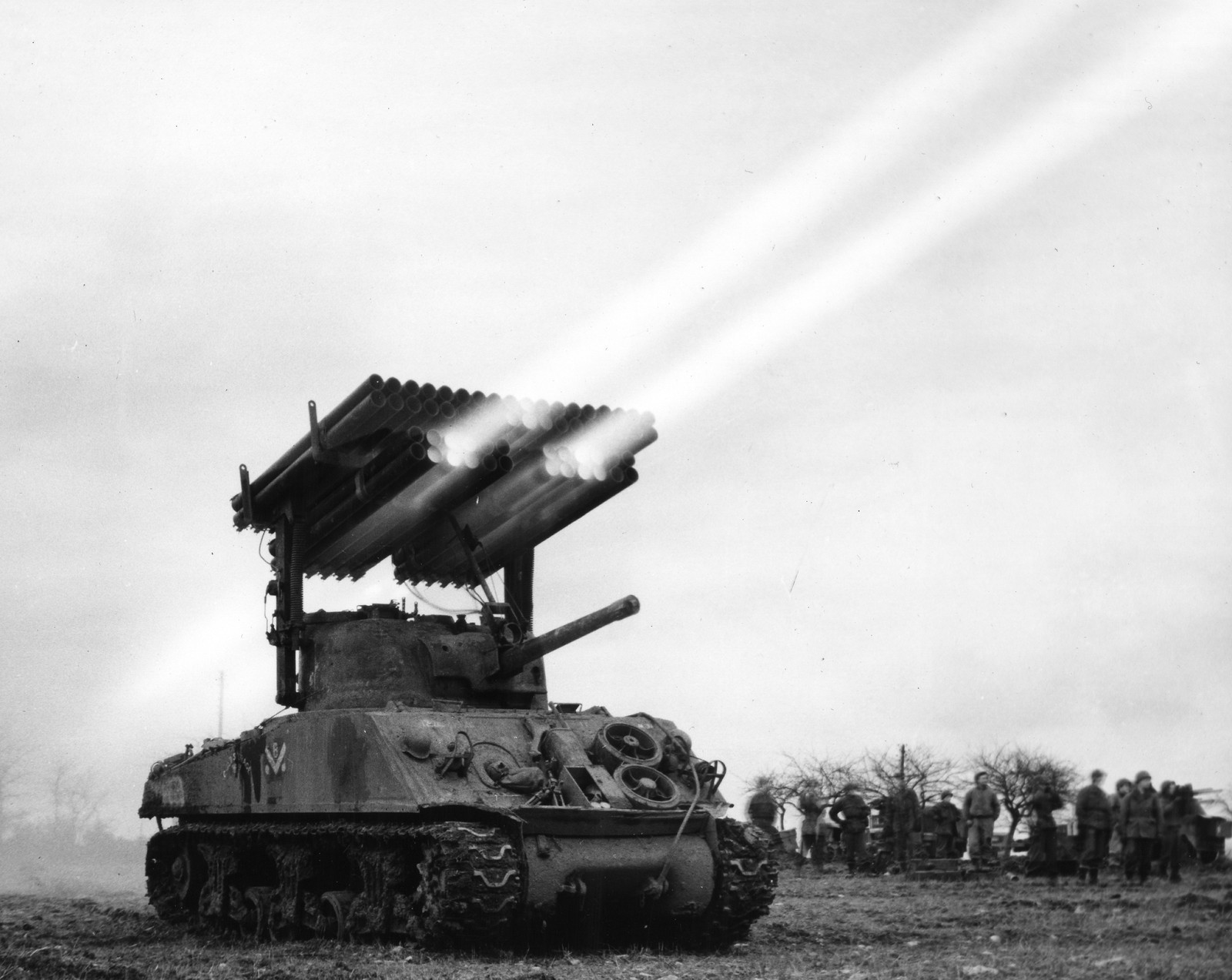
- T34 Calliope in France
- Type: Tank-mounted rocket launcher (rocket-artillery tank)
- Place of origin: United States

Service history
- Wars: World War II

Production history
- Designer: Victor Hawkins
- Designed: 1943

Specifications
- Main armament: 60 × 4.5 in (114 mm) rockets (T34), 64 × 4.5 in (114 mm) rockets (T34E1)

The Rocket Launcher T34 (Calliope) was a tank-mounted multiple rocket launcher used by the United States Army during World War II. The launcher was placed atop the M4 Sherman, with its prominent vertical side frames anchored to the turret's sides and fired a barrage of 4.5-inch (114 mm) M8 rockets from 60 launch tubes. It was developed in 1943; small numbers were produced and were used by various US armor units in 1944–45. Its name comes from the calliope, a musical instrument also known as a steam organ, which has similar parallel or clustered pipes.

== Design ==
The Sherman (calliope) version of the Calliope carried 60 rockets arranged in a group of 36 permanent tubes on the top, and a pair of jettisonable groups of 12 tubes (24 tubes in total) on the bottom. Each rocket was armed with a 4.5-inch (110 mm) fin-stabilized projectile armed with high explosives that had the same explosive yield as a M101 howitzer and had a maximum range of 4,100 yards (3,700 m).

The rack was physically connected to the barrel of the 75 mm gun M2–M6 using an arm. This arm was connected to the rack via a pivoting joint and clamped to the gun with a split ring. This allowed the missile launcher to follow the same elevation and depression arc of +25 to -12 degrees. A large support beam bolted to the left and right turret cheeks supported the weapon placed one meter above the turret.

The rockets were fired electrically using cables that were inserted through the tank commander's hatch. The main gun could not be fired once the rocket launcher had been attached. This caused the tank crews to modify the launcher's installation in the field, thereby allowing the main gun to fire, albeit at a reduced elevation for the launcher. Later models of the launcher also had flame deflectors to help prevent rocket exhaust from entering the engine compartment.

== Variants ==
- Rocket Launcher T34E1 (Calliope): Same as the T34 but groups of 12 jettisonable tubes replaced by groups of 14 tubes.
- Rocket Launcher T34E2 (Calliope): Almost identical to the T34E1, but had an upgraded firing system.

== Service history ==
Although Calliopes were originally manufactured before D-Day and were envisioned for bunker-busting duties on the beaches, the proposal was dropped due to the tank's high center of gravity which made its transportation unsteady. Thirty M4s of the 743rd Tank Battalion had the T34 launchers installed to assist a planned push by the 30th Infantry Division in December 1944. The German Ardennes offensive stopped this plan, and the launchers were subsequently removed and not reinstalled on tanks until February 1945 with General Patton's army. In March 1945, when Patton's army was pushing through the Saarland in western Germany, the launchers did manage to see some usage in armored divisions.

In 1945, it was used in various actions by the 2nd, 4th, 6th, 12th, and 14th armored divisions. Although seeing limited action, it was effective as a weapon for psychological warfare. The noise generated by launches was sometimes enough to scare enemy soldiers.

== See also ==
- Katyusha rocket launcher
- List of U.S. Army Rocket Launchers By Model Number
- MAR-240
- Matilda "Hedgehog"
- Mattress
- Sherman Tulip
- Panzerwerfer
- T40 Whizbang

== Sources ==
- Hunting, David. The New Weapons of the World Encyclopedia. New York City: Diagram Visual Information Ltd., 2007. ISBN 0-312-36832-1
- Nash, Mark (27 January 2018). "Rocket Launcher T34 'Calliope'". Online Tank Museum.
- Green, Michael. American Tanks and AFVs of World War II. Osprey Publishing, 2014, ISBN 978-1-78200-979-5
