= Maultier =

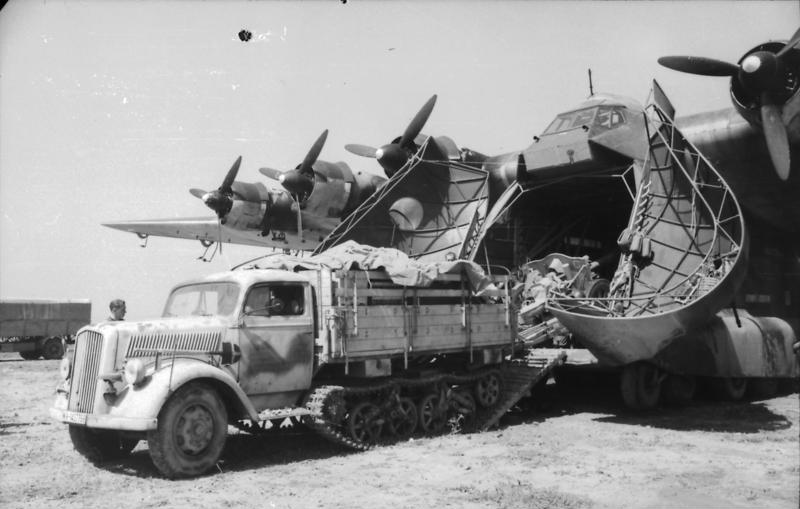
- Opel Maultier exiting from a Messerschmitt Me 323 Gigant transport.
- Type: Half-track
- Place of origin: Nazi Germany

Service history
- In service: 1941 - 1945
- Wars: World War II

Production history
- Designed: 1941
- Produced: 1942-1944
- No. built: 20,945

Specifications
- Mass: 3,930–5,500 kg (8,660–12,130 lb)
- Length: 5.95–7.9 m (19 ft 6 in – 25 ft 11 in)
- Width: 2.25–2.36 m (7 ft 5 in – 7 ft 9 in)
- Height: 2.1–3.2 m (6 ft 11 in – 10 ft 6 in)
- Crew: 2
- Armor: none
- Engine: 3.6-litre 6-cyl petrol engine (Opel Blitz)
- Maximum speed: 36–38 km/h (22–24 mph)

Maultier (English: "mule") or Sd.Kfz. 3 is the name given to series of half-track trucks used by Nazi Germany during World War II. They were based on Opel, Mercedes-Benz, Alfa Romeo or Ford trucks.

== History ==
Soon after invading the USSR, German troops discovered that their wheeled transport vehicles were unsuitable for the sparse road network, particularly in the muddy conditions of the rasputitsa. Only half tracks like the Sd.Kfz. 11 could haul supplies to forward units in these conditions, but removing them from their combat role for supply duties was not feasible, so it was decided to produce half-tracked versions of standard Opel, Daimler-Benz, Alfa-Romeo and Ford trucks (lorries) by removing their rear axles, truncating the prop-shafts and connecting them to the track assemblies of redundant Panzer I light tanks. Heavier trucks (4 tons payload) were fitted with Panzer II track assemblies.

Horstmann suspension components employed by the Panzer I was practically identical to the light tank track system used on the Universal Carrier, with the Maultier's use of them closely resembling the roadwheel/suspension system used by the T16 American-produced version in its roadwheel design. Most Maultier conversions were based on Opel Blitz model S trucks, which proved successful in service. Although they lacked the overall mobility of purpose-built half tracks, they were cheaper and sufficiently effective.

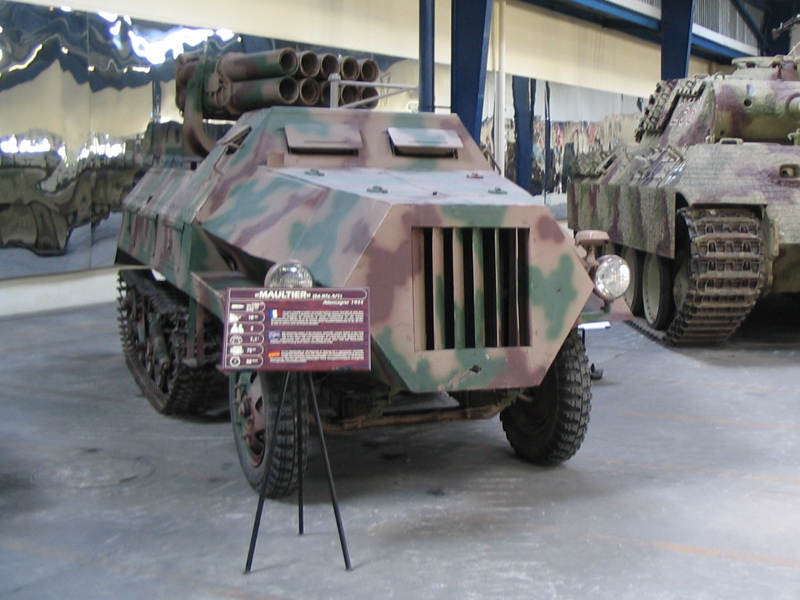
Sd.Kfz. 4 (armored Maultier) with Panzerwerfer 42 multiple rocket launcher.

From 1943 some Maultier trucks were fitted with armored bodies, designated Sd.Kfz. 4. Some of these were armed with ten-tube rocket launcher Panzerwerfer 42, and were designated Sd.Kfz.. 4/1.

== Production ==
The vehicles were built by Opel at the Klöckner-Humboldt-Deutz AG and also in France in the Ford factory in Asnieres. In 1942 a total of 635 vehicles were produced, 1943 there were 13,000 and 1944 only 7,310.

== See also ==
- List of Sd.Kfz. designations
- Radschlepper Ost
- Raupenschlepper Ost
