= Radschlepper Ost =

Radschlepper Ost (Škoda RSO)
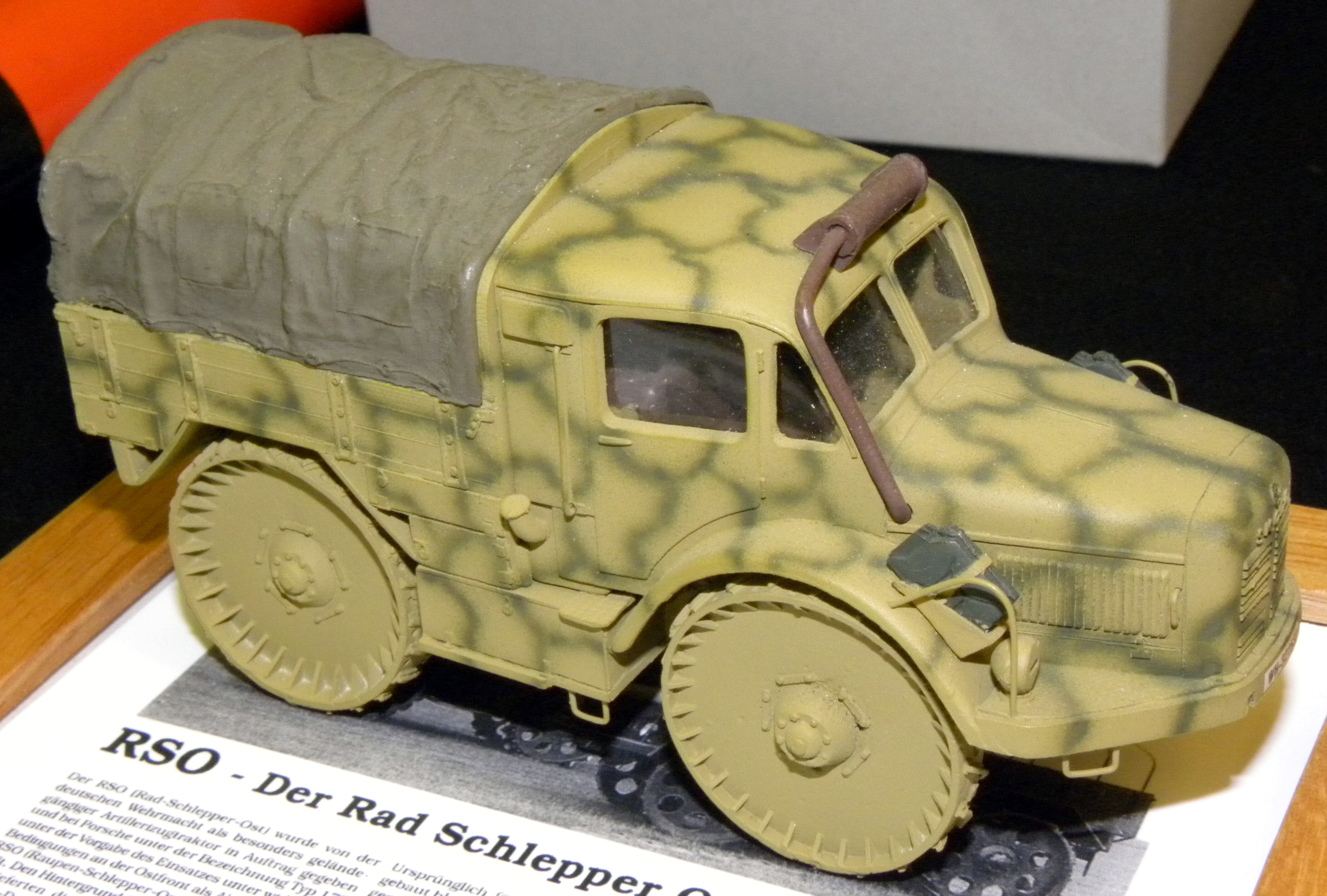
- model of Škoda RSO
- Type: Artillery tractor
- Place of origin: Nazi Germany

Production history
- Designer: Ferdinand Porsche
- Designed: 1941
- Manufacturer: Škoda Auto
- Produced: 1942–1944
- No. built: 206

Specifications
- Mass: 7 t (6.9 long tons; 7.7 short tons)
- Length: 6.22 m (20 ft 5 in)
- Width: 2.30 m (7 ft 7 in)
- Height: 3.065 m (10 ft 0.7 in)
- Armor: None
- Engine: 4-cylinder Petrol, 6023 cc 90 hp (67 kW)
- Payload capacity: 5 t (4.9 long tons; 5.5 short tons)
- Suspension: leaf springs
- Operational range: 120 km (75 mi)
- Maximum speed: 16 km/h (9.9 mph)

Radschlepper Ost, literally "wheeled tractor east", also known as Škoda RSO or Porsche 175, was a German heavy four-wheel drive military tractor used during World War II. It was designed by Ferdinand Porsche in 1941 and produced by Škoda in Mladá Boleslav. Around 206 vehicles were produced between the years 1942–1944.

== History ==
The idea of a heavy multipurpose tractor, intended for the prepared invasion of the Soviet Union supposedly came from Adolf Hitler. In 1941, Ferdinand Porsche prepared a design of a four-wheel drive tractor, distinguished by its large diameter - 1.50 m (4 ft 11 in) - steel cleated wheels. The vehicle was powered by Porsche's own design air-cooled, inline-four petrol engine of 6,023 cc (368 cu in) displacement. As a starter, a two-cylinder petrol engine (half of KdF-Wagen engine) was used.

Final development and production took place in the Škoda automobile plant in Mladá Boleslav, in what was then the Protectorate of Bohemia and Moravia. The RSO went through its first trials in 1942, but results were disappointing; high weight and narrow wheels caused high ground pressure, causing the tractor to get stuck easily even on a relatively solid surface. On icy surfaces, the vehicle was almost impossible to steer. Fuel consumption was also unfavourably high. Production still went ahead despite these problems, with around 200 tractors produced during 1942–1944. Because of their faults, they were never deployed on the Eastern Front; instead, they served in Normandy and the Netherlands. Some of them supposedly participated in the Battle of the Bulge.

No vehicles are known to have survived to the present day.

== See also ==
- Maultier
- Raupenschlepper Ost
