= Sd.Kfz. 4 =

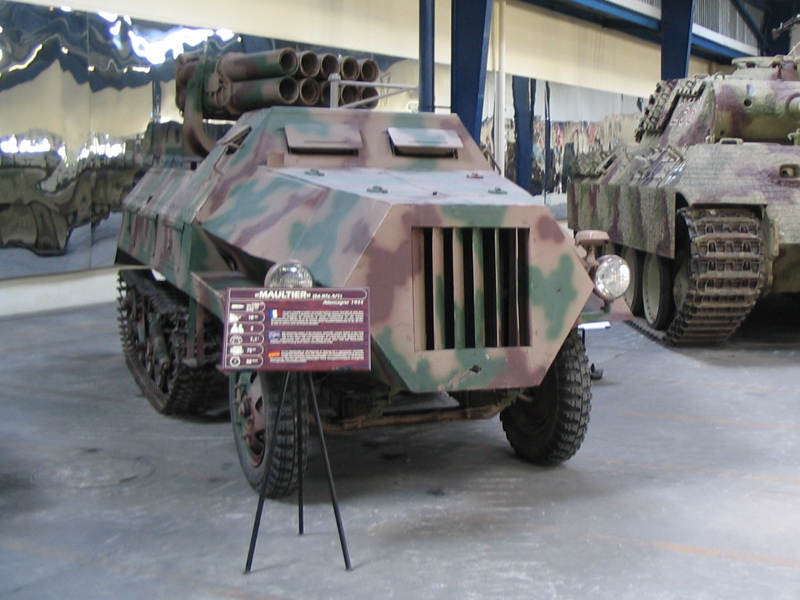
- 15 cm Panzerwerfer auf Sf (Sd.Kfz. 4/1) at the Saumur Tank Museum
- Type: Half-track/Multiple rocket launcher
- Place of origin: Nazi Germany

Service history
- Used by: Nazi Germany
- Wars: World War II

Specifications
- Mass: 7.1 tonnes
- Length: 6 m
- Width: 2.2 m
- Height: 2.5 m
- Crew: 4
- Armor: 8 mm
- Main armament: 7.92 mm MG34 or MG42; 2,000 rounds
- Engine: 6-cylinder Opel 3.6-litre engine.
- Operational range: 130 km
- Maximum speed: 40 km/h

The Sd.Kfz. 4 was a 4.5-tonne military truck of Maultier ("mule") half-track family developed during World War II by Germany. Its manufacturer designation was Mercedes-Benz L4500R.

== Development ==
The Sd.Kfz. 4 was developed after the German invasion of the USSR in 1941 to deal with the ice and mud, which bogged down the wheels-only road-bound commercial vehicles that were used to supply German forces. It was a modified Standard Mercedes-Benz L4500S (4x2) with Horstmann suspension instead of a rear axle. Another manufacturer of 4.5-t truck, Büssing planned a similar conversion of its Büssing-NAG L4500S but did not proceed.

A total of 22,500 Maultier halftracks were produced by 1944, among which 1480 were 4.5-tonne. Sd.Kfz. 4, others 2-tonne. Sd.Kfz. 3. In 1943 Opel was directed to build armored vehicles outfitted with 15 cm Panzerwerfer 42 rocket launchers. These vehicles were designated Sd.Kfz. 4/1, with around 300 produced. Given the extra weight of the Panzerwerfer, the top speed was only 24 mph (40 km/h). Another multiple rocket launching system, the 8 cm Raketen-Vielfachwerfer, was also fitted to the Sd.Kfz. 4 chassis.

The vast majority of Maultiers operated using British-pattern Carden-Loyd running gear, with the exception of the Type L4500R, which used the running gear of the Panzer II light tank. The six-cylinder engines were mated to a transmission with five forward gears plus reverse and could attain a maximum forward speed of 40 km/h. Each halftrack was equipped with the FuG Spr G f radio.

Aside from the Sd.Kfz. 4/1, the Sd.Kfz. 4 was armed only with a light 7.92 mm MG 34 or MG 42 machine gun with a traverse of 270° and elevation limits of -12° to +80°.

== See also ==
- Sd.Kfz. 6
- Sd.Kfz. 7
- Sd.Kfz. 8
- Sd.Kfz. 9
- Sd.Kfz. 11
- Sd.Kfz. 250
- Sd.Kfz. 251
