= Sd.Kfz. 11 =

leichter Zugkraftwagen 3t, Sd.Kfz. 11
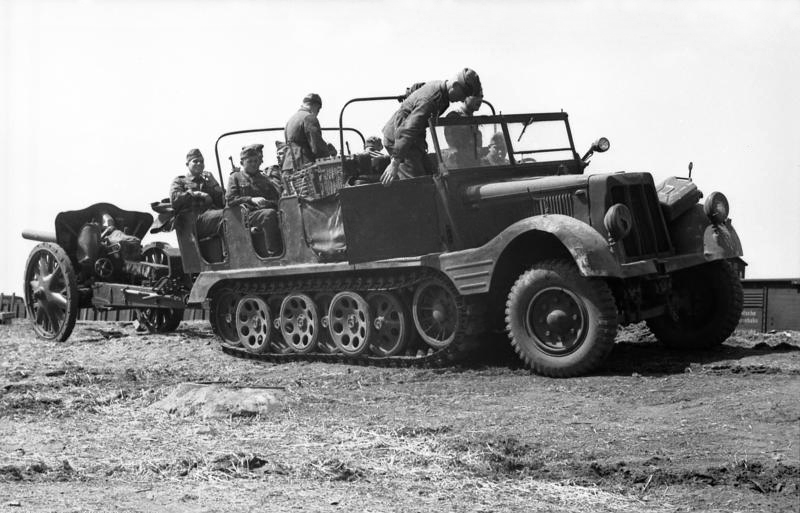
- Sd.Kfz. 11 artillery tractor with an engineer body
- Type: Light half-track
- Place of origin: Nazi Germany

Service history
- In service: 1938–1945
- Used by: Nazi Germany; Kingdom of Romania
- Wars: World War II

Production history
- Designer: Hanomag
- Designed: 1934–1938
- Manufacturer: Hanomag, Adlerwerke, Horch, Škoda, Borgward
- Unit cost: 22,000 ℛ︁ℳ︁
- Produced: 1938–1945
- No. built: Approx. 9,000
- Variants: Sd.Kfz. 11/1, Sd.Kfz. 11/2, Sd.Kfz. 11/3, Sd.Kfz. 11/4, Sd.Kfz. 11/5, Sd.Kfz. 251

Specifications (late Sd.Kfz. 11)
- Mass: 7,200 kilograms (15,900 lb)
- Length: 5.55 metres (18.2 ft)
- Width: 2 metres (6.6 ft)
- Height: 2.15 metres (7.1 ft)
- Crew: 2 + 6
- Main armament: none
- Engine: 4.1L Maybach HL42 TRKM petrol 6-cylinder, water-cooled 100 horsepower (100 PS)
- Payload capacity: 1,800 kilograms (4,000 lb)
- Transmission: 4 + 1 speed Hanomag U 50
- Suspension: torsion bar
- Ground clearance: 32 centimetres (13 in)
- Fuel capacity: 110 litres (29 US gal)
- Operational range: 240 kilometres (150 mi) (road); 140 kilometres (87 mi) (cross-country)
- Maximum speed: 52.5 km/h (32.6 mph) (road)

The Sd.Kfz. 11 (Sonderkraftfahrzeug – special motor vehicle) was a German half-track that saw widespread use in World War II. Its main role was as a prime mover for medium towed guns ranging from the 3.7 cm FlaK 43 anti-aircraft gun up to the 10.5 cm leFH 18 field howitzer. It could carry eight troops in addition to towing a gun or trailer.

The basic engineering for all the German half-tracks was developed during the Weimar era by the Reichswehr's Military Automotive Department, but final design and testing was farmed out to commercial firms with the understanding that production would be shared with multiple companies. Borgward (Note: The actual development was done by Hansa-Lloyd, a subsidiary of the Borgward Group.) was chosen to develop the second smallest of the German half-tracks and built a series of prototypes between 1934 and 1937. However development was taken over in 1938 by Hanomag who designed the main production version, H kl 6.

The chassis formed the basis for the Sd.Kfz. 251 medium armored personnel carrier. Approximately 9,000 were produced between 1938 and 1945, making it one of the more numerous German tactical vehicles of the war. It participated in the Invasion of Poland, the Battle of France, the Balkans Campaign and fought on both the Western Front and the Eastern Front, in North Africa and in Italy. Nine were also received by the Kingdom of Romania in late 1942.

== Description ==
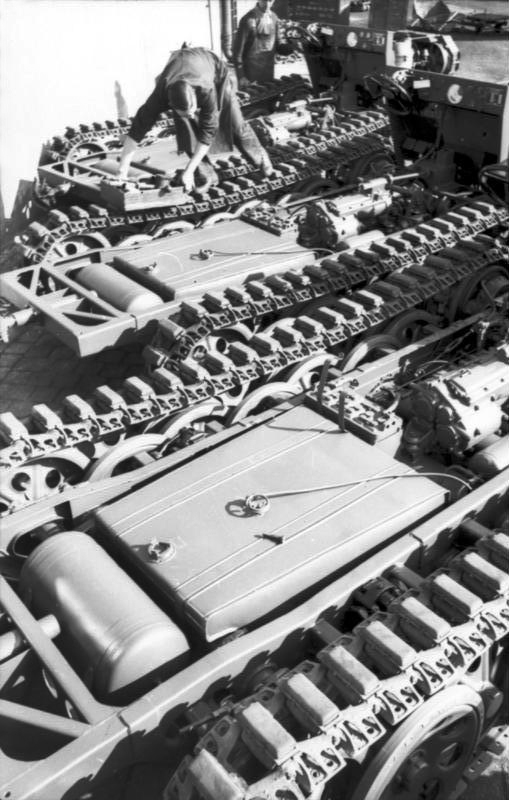
Sd.Kfz. 11 chassis shown at the factory. From left, the muffler, fuel tank and transmission are visible

The Sd.Kfz. 11 used a conventional ladder frame. Power was provided by a front-mounted Maybach six-cylinder, water-cooled, 4.17 litres (254 cu in) HL 42 TRKM gasoline engine of 100 horsepower (100 PS). It had a Hanomag U 50 transmission with four forward and one reverse gears. Maximum speed was 52.5 km/h (32.6 mph) and it could ford water .5 metres (1.6 ft) deep.

Both tracks and wheels were powered as well as used for steering. The steering system was set up so that shallow turns used only the wheels, but brakes would be applied to the tracks the farther the steering wheel was turned. The drive sprockets had rollers rather than the more common teeth. The rear suspension consisted of six double roadwheels, overlapping and interleaved in the Schachtellaufwerk system, mounted on swing arms sprung by torsion bars. An idler wheel, mounted at the rear of the vehicle, was used to control track tension. The front wheels, carried on the rigid front axle, had transversely mounted leaf springs and shock absorbers, the only ones on the vehicle, to dampen impacts.

Two different upper bodies were built over the production run of the Sd.Kfz. 11. The "artillery" body had an ammunition compartment separating the driver's compartment from the crew compartment. The ammunition compartment had doors that opened on each side of the vehicle and could be configured for different sizes of ammunition. Bench seats on the sides of the vehicle, with under-seat storage, could accommodate six men. The crew entered from the rear of the vehicle. The windshield could fold forward and was also removable. A convertible canvas top was mounted above the ammunition compartment. It fastened to the windshield and to the rear of the crew compartment when erected. Side pieces could be mounted to protect the crew from the weather.

The "engineer" body had three bench seats for the crew and a convertible canvas top was mounted at the upper part of the rear body. It fastened to the windshield when erected. Side pieces could be mounted to protect the crew from the weather. There was a storage compartment at the rear of the vehicle, underneath the crew seats. Photographic evidence shows both "artillery" and "engineer" versions were used by artillery units.

== Design and development ==
Preliminary design of all the German half-tracks of the early part of the war was done by Dipl.Ing. Ernst Kniepkamp of the Military Automotive Department (Wa. Prüf. 6) before the Nazis took power in 1933. His designs were then turned over to commercial firms for development and testing. Borgward was assigned to develop the 3 tonnes (3.0 long tons; 3.3 short tons) towing vehicle with the first HL. kl. 2 prototype produced in 1933. It had a six-cylinder, 3.485 litres (212.7 cu in), 71 horsepower (72 PS) Hansa-Lloyd Type 3500 L engine mounted in the front, a four-speed Hansa-Lloyd-Goliath transmission, had only four roadwheels per side and weighed 5 tonnes (4.9 long tons; 5.5 short tons). The improved HL. kl. 3 pre-production model followed in 1936, but differed only in details from the earlier prototype.

The first production model was the HL.kl.5 which still used the Type 3500 L engine and the Hansa-Lloyd-Goliath transmission, but was lengthened by two roadwheels per side. It weighed 6.5 tonnes (6.4 long tons; 7.2 short tons) and could carry a payload of 1,500 kilograms (3,300 lb) while towing a 3 tonnes (3.0 long tons; 3.3 short tons) load. 505 were made by Borgward between 1936 and 1938 at the price of 20,000 Reichsmarks each.

Hanomag took over development of the vehicle in 1938 and designed the H kl 6 which initially used a Maybach HL38 TUKR engine that was superseded early in the production run by a HL42 TUKRM developing around 100 hp/PS. Hanomag replaced the Hansa-Lloyd-Goliath transmission with their own four-speed U 50 transmission and enlarged the fuel tank to 110 litres (29 US gal). The vehicle weight climbed to 7,200 kilograms (15,900 lb), but the payload also increased to 1,800 kilograms (4,000 lb).

== Production ==
Borgward and Hanomag initially built the Sd.Kfz. 11 chassis, but later Adlerwerke of Frankfurt-am-Main, Horch of Zwickau and Škoda of Mladá Boleslav were added to the production plan. On 20 December 1942 some 4209 were in service. 2133 were built in 1943 and 1308 in 1944. All told, over 9000 were built by 1945.

== Variants ==
=== Sd.Kfz. 11/1 ===
There were two vehicles created during the war and given this designation. The earlier vehicle was a version of the Sd.Kfz. 11, an ammunition carrier for the 10 cm Nebelwerfer 35 or 40 mortar. The ammunition compartment had racks to hold the shells and their propellant with side-opening doors. The later version created in 1944 was an anti aircraft vehicle using the armoured front superstructure of the Sd.Kfz. 251 and mounting a 2 cm Flak 38 gun.

=== Sd.Kfz. 11/2 ===
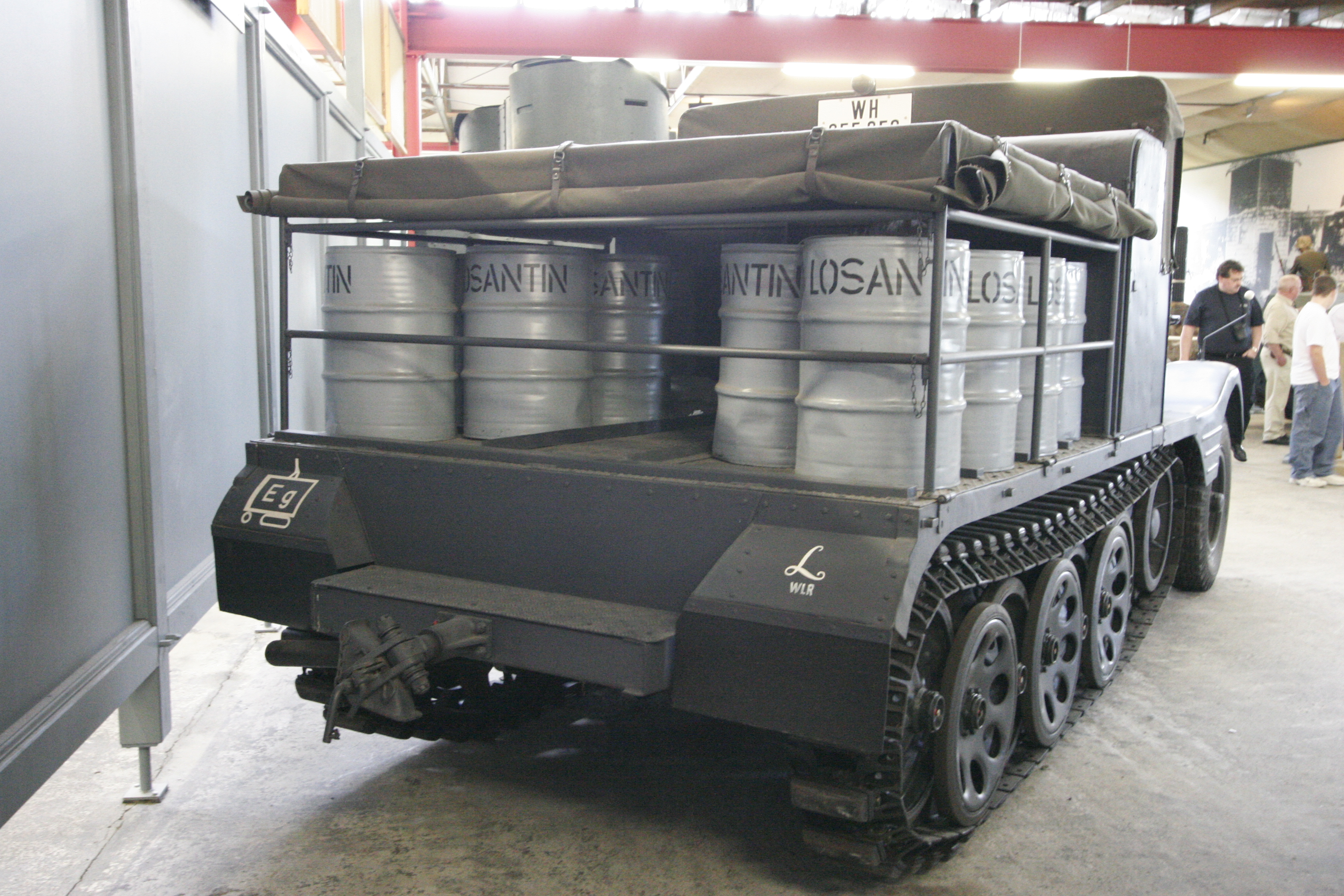
A Sd.Kfz. 11/2 painted with the insignia of the Werfer-Lehr Regiment

The Sd.Kfz. 11/2 was a chemical decontamination vehicle fitted with a 70 kg (150 lb) capacity spreader and space for eight barrels of decontamination chemicals. This left room for only three crewmen. The barrels were stowed on platforms over the tracks with foldable outer rails.

According to a reliable report the medium vehicle carries 760 kilograms (1,680 pounds) of bleach; a strip 1.7 meters (5 feet 7 inches) wide and 1.4 kilometers (just over a mile) long can be decontaminated by using a density of 300 grams (0.66 pounds) of bleach per square meter. The density at which the vehicle distributes decontaminant is independent of the vehicle speed, the maximum potential density is 600 grams (1.3 pounds) per square meter. In addition to this, each vehicle carries 16 decontamination canisters, each holding 22 pounds (10.0 kg) of decontaminant, for use by hand on isolated areas.

=== Sd.Kfz. 11/3 ===
The Sd.Kfz. 11/3 was equipped with a 500 litres (130 US gal) tank and spray system to lay down poison gas barriers. The spray nozzle swung back and forth to cover a width of 16 metres (52 ft). 125 were built in 1937.

=== Sd.Kfz. 11/4 ===
The Sd.Kfz. 11/4 was an ammunition vehicle for units using the 15 cm Nebelwerfer 41 multiple rocket launcher. Its ammunition racks could carry 10.5 centimetres (4.1 in) mortar shells, 15 centimetres (5.9 in) or 21 centimetres (8.3 in) rockets. It could carry thirty-six 15 cm or ten 21 cm rockets as well as the six man crew of the launcher.

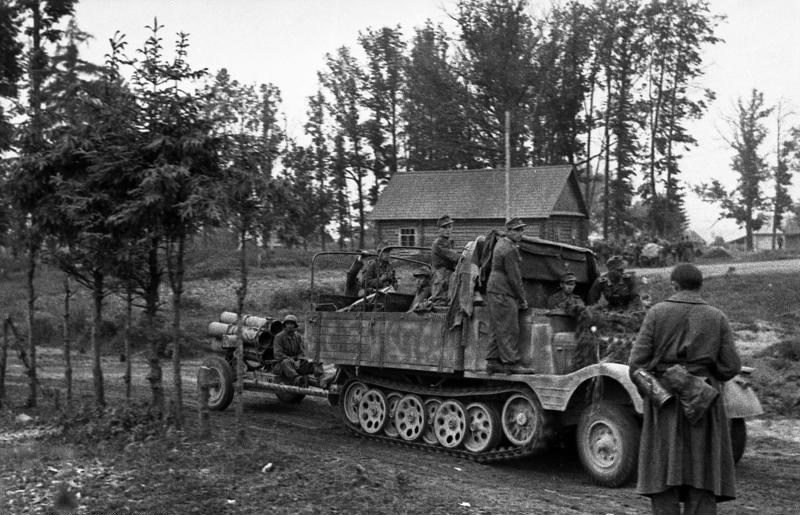
A Sd.Kfz. 11/5 in Russia towing a 21 cm Nebelwerfer 42

=== Sd.Kfz. 11/5 ===
The Sd.Kfz. 11/5 was an ammunition vehicle for units using the Nebelwerfer multiple rocket launcher. Unlike earlier Nebelwerfer ammunition vehicles it was given a wooden upper body with two compartments. The forward cargo compartment was open-topped and lacked the racks of earlier models. The rear crew compartment had a bench seat facing the rear of the vehicle with rifle racks on each side of the seat.

== See also ==
- Sd.Kfz. 4
- Sd.Kfz. 6
- Sd.Kfz. 7
- Sd.Kfz. 8
- Sd.Kfz. 9
- Sd.Kfz. 10
- Sd.Kfz. 250
- Sd.Kfz. 251
