= Panzerwerfer =

German half-track multiple rocket launcher

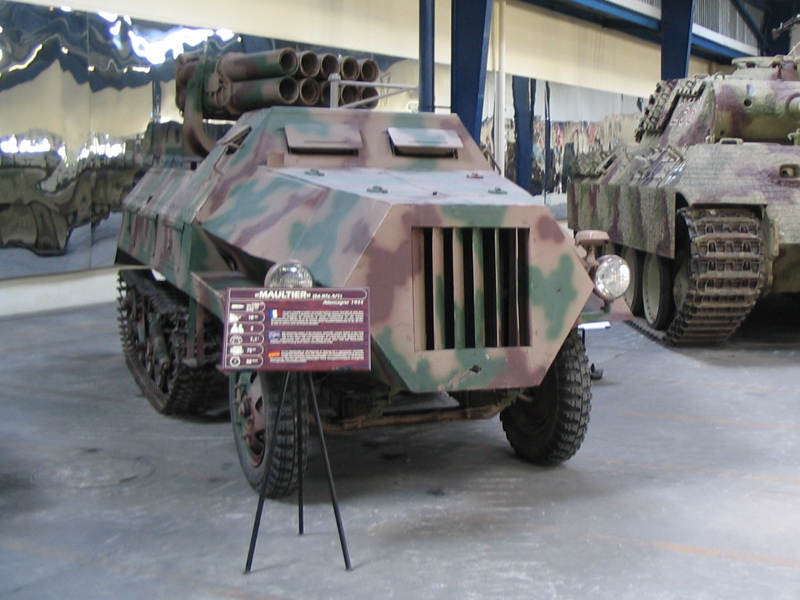
- Panzerwerfer 42 auf Maultier (Sd.Kfz. 4/1)
- Type: Half-track multiple rocket launcher
- Place of origin: Nazi Germany

Service history
- In service: 1943–1945
- Used by: Nazi Germany
- Wars: World War II

Production history
- Designer: Opel
- Manufacturer: Opel
- No. built: 300

Specifications
- Mass: 7.1 tonnes (6.99 long tons or 7.83 short tons)
- Length: 6 m (19 ft 8 in)
- Width: 2.2 m (7 ft 3 in)
- Height: 2.5 m (8 ft 2 in)
- Crew: 3
- Armor: 6–14.5 mm (0.24–0.57 in)
- Main armament: 15 cm Nebelwerfer 41
- Secondary armament: MG 34 or MG 42
- Engine: Adam Opel 6-cylinder petrol engine 69 PS (68 hp)
- Power/weight: 9.58 hp/tonne
- Suspension: Coil spring (track); Leaf spring (wheels)
- Operational range: 130 km (81 mi)
- Maximum speed: 40 km/h (25 mph)

The German Panzerwerfer refers to either of two different types of half-tracked multiple rocket launchers employed by Nazi Germany during the Second World War. The two self-propelled artillery vehicles are the 15 cm Panzerwerfer 42 auf Selbstfahrlafette Sd.Kfz.4/1 (based on the Opel '‘Maultier’’, or "mule", half-track) and the 15 cm Panzerwerfer 42 auf Schwerer Wehrmachtsschlepper (Panzerwerfer auf SWS).

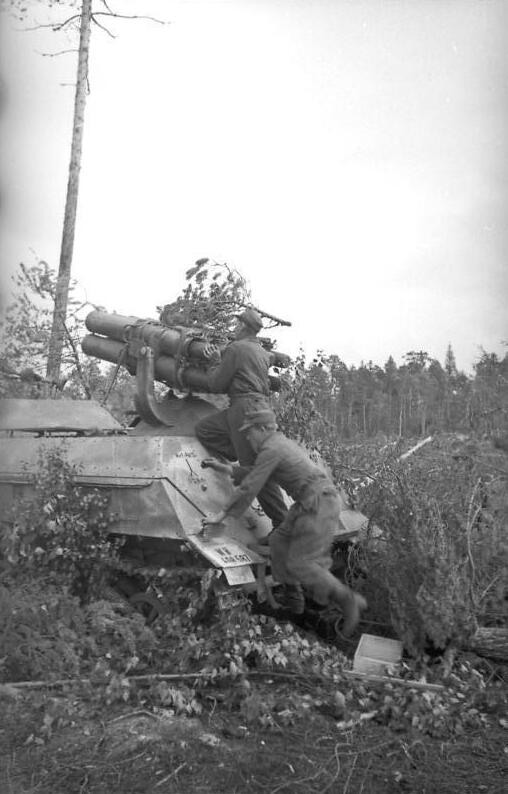
Two soldiers operating a Panzerwerfer in Lapland on the Eastern Front, 1944

== Development ==
The Panzerwerfer 42 auf Maultier, Sd.Kfz. 4/1, first went into production in April 1943, and was produced until March 1945. Hitler called for production of the vehicle in January 1942, and the vehicle saw its first tests on the Eastern Front in fall of 1943. Opel was the main manufacturer, producing most of the components, including the 3.6 liter, six cylinder Adam Opel engine, which had 68 horsepower and an 80-liter fuel capacity. Throughout the three years it was produced, 300 Panzerwerfer and 289 of its variant, the Munitionskraftwagen, were made.

== Combat history ==
=== Campaign in the Soviet Union ===
The Panzerwerfer 42 auf Maultier was used for larger scale rocket barrages against Soviet positions where a large bombardment of a big area would be more effective than more accurate artillery fire. The Panzerwerfer's rocket barrages covered much larger areas and added more psychological elements to the fight: the amount of noise, smoke, splinters, and flying debris as the rockets hit and exploded was considerable. The extensive use on the Eastern Front showed that this weapon could be employed effectively on the Western Front as well. The weapon was finally introduced throughout the army on May 14, 1944, in France.

=== Campaign in France ===
The western Allies first faced the Panzerwerfer 42 after 6 June (D-Day). American intelligence before D-Day pointed to the use of rocket launchers such as the Nebelwerfer by the German Wehrmacht, but they were unprepared for the effects of a mobile, armored, camouflaged, and highly destructive rocket launcher mounted on a half-track chassis. The British and Canadians were the first of the western Allies to see the German rocket launchers in action against troop concentrations and Allied positions. The 7th Werfer Brigade, made up of the 83rd and 84th Regiments, was sent to Normandy from Beauvais after D-Day, and on June 10 it was in Falaise; the next day, it was about 10 km (6.2 mi) from Caen. The unit was part of the attack on the Orne Bridge, which was a British held position over the Orne River. The 84th Regiment of the brigade had fourteen combat-ready Panzerwerfer, and the 83rd had about the same. Some other Werfer units were the 101st SS Werfer Abteilung, 101st Stellungs-Werfer Regiment, and the 102nd SS Werfer Abteilung, which was part of the 2nd SS Panzer Division Das Reich. The 7th Werfer Brigade fired 8,000 tons of ammunition, notably onto Hill 112 (during Operation Jupiter) in support of its recapture by German forces on June 30. The British were usually at the receiving end of the Panzerwerfer rockets in Normandy, but the 15 cm Nebelwerfers were used in large numbers against American, British, and Canadian troops throughout the summer of 1944.

=== Ardennes and Berlin ===
The Battle of the Bulge saw intensive use of German armored rocket launchers. The most concentrated, massed salvos were used in the Ardennes region of Belgium in 1944 during the weeks of the German offensive.

Panzerwerfer saw extensive use during April and May 1945, as the Soviets were quickly advancing on Berlin and the German forces employed rocket artillery in a defensive mode. Rocket launchers were used in large numbers defending positions inside of Germany and close to Berlin as the Soviets advanced from the east and the Allies from the west.

== Vehicle performance and weapon specifications ==
The Panzerwerfer 42 auf Maultier weighed 7.1 tonnes, was 6 meters long, 2.2 meters wide, and 2.5 meters in height. It was capable of a top speed of 40 km/h (25 mph) enabling it to quickly relocate after firing. As main armament, the vehicle mounted the 150 mm (5.9 in) Nebelwerfer 41 rocket launcher which was traversable through 360 degrees and was sighted with a Richtaufsatz 35 optic. Different projectile types could be fired such as Wurfgranate 41 Kh Nebel smoke and Wurfgranate 41 Spreng high explosive rockets. A total of twenty rounds were carried, enough for two salvos with ten rockets in the launcher plus an additional ten stowed internally on racks. The rockets were manually loaded through a hatch on the chassis roof. Minimum rocket range was 300 metres (980 ft) with the maximum being 6,900 metres (22,600 ft). Additional armament consisted of a 7.92 mm (0.312 in) MG 34 or MG 42 machine gun on a Fliegerschwenkarm mount which was installed on the cab roof for anti-aircraft purposes and a Nebelwurfgerät smoke grenade launcher mounted on the forward chassis which was used for quick concealment.

== Reputation ==
Known as the "Moaning Minnie" by Allied soldiers for the distinctive noise the rockets made when fired, it was less accurate than a dedicated artillery piece, but its ability to saturate an area with fire and its psychological effects on infantry made it a valuable asset.

== Bibliography ==
- Baschin, J.; Block, M.; Nelson, J. & Tippmann, H. (2013). Nebel-, Panzer- und Vielfachwacher (in English and German). Vol. 30. Neumünster: Nuts & Bolts Verlag.
- Jentz, Thomas & Doyle, Hilary (2004). Panzer Tracts No.17 Gepanzerte Nachschub Fahrzeuge VK 3.01 to schwere Wehrmacht-Schlepper. Boyds, MD: Panzer Tracts Publishing. ISBN 0974486248.
- Ward, Stephan (2002). "Panzerwerfer 42 auf Maultier in Action". missing-lynx.com.
