= Sd.Kfz. 9 =

German half-track family

Schwerer Zugkraftwagen 18 t, Sd.Kfz. 9
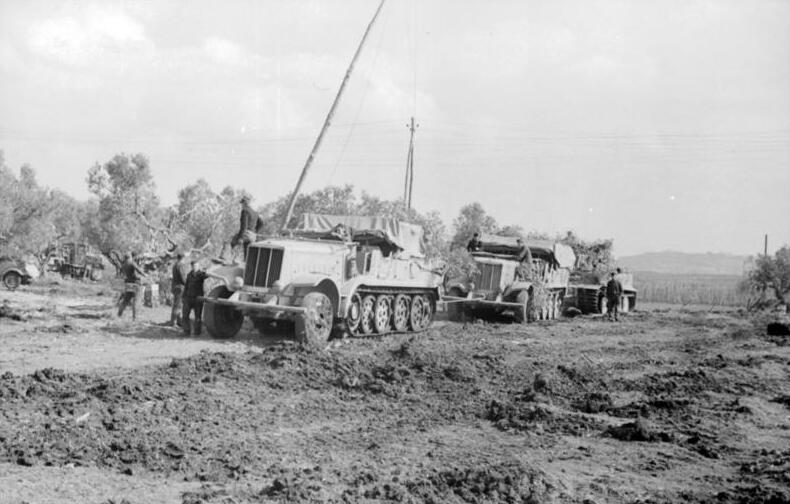
- Two Sd.Kfz. 9s towing a Tiger I in Italy, 1944
- Type: Heavy half-track
- Place of origin: Nazi Germany

Service history
- In service: 1938–1945
- Used by: Nazi Germany; Romania; Finland (Tsardom of Bulgaria (1908–1946)) Kingdom of Bulgaria
- Wars: World War II

Production history
- Designer: FAMO
- Designed: 1936–1939
- Manufacturer: FAMO, Vomag, Tatra
- Unit cost: 60,000 Reichsmark
- Produced: 1939–1945
- No. built: approx. 2,500
- Variants: Sd.Kfz. 9/1, Sd.Kfz. 9/2

Specifications
- Mass: 18 t (40,000 lb)
- Length: 8.32 m (27 ft 4 in)
- Width: 2.6 m (8 ft 6 in)
- Height: 2.85 m (9 ft 4 in) overall
- Crew: depends on body type fitted
- Engine: 10.8L Maybach HL108 TUKRM V12; 270 hp (200 kW)
- Payload capacity: 2,620 kg (5,780 lb)
- Transmission: 4 + 1 speed ZF G 65 VL 230
- Suspension: torsion bar
- Ground clearance: 44 cm (17 in)
- Fuel capacity: 290 L (77 US gal)
- Operational range: 260 km (160 mi) road 100 km (62 mi) cross-country
- Maximum speed: 50 km/h (31 mph) road

The Sd.Kfz. 9 (Note: Sonderkraftfahrzeug German:" special motorized vehicle") (also known as "Famo") was a German half-track that saw widespread use in World War II, and the heaviest half-track vehicle of any type built in quantity in Nazi Germany during the war years. Its main roles were as a prime mover for very heavy towed guns such as the 24 cm Kanone 3 and as a tank recovery vehicle. Approximately 2,500 were produced between 1938 and 1945.

== Description ==
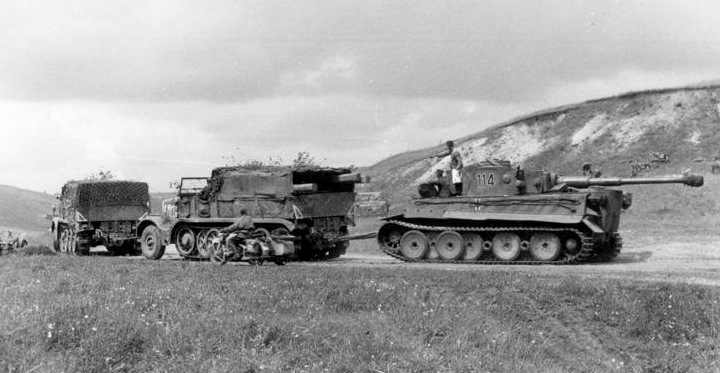
Two Sd.Kfz. 9s towing a Tiger I in the Soviet Union, July 1943

The Sd.Kfz. 9 had a ladder frame chassis. Power was provided by a Maybach 12-cylinder, water-cooled, 10.8-litre (660 cu in) HL 108 gasoline engine of 270 hp (200 kW). It had a synchromesh ZF G 65 VL 230 transmission with four forward and one reverse gears. The vehicle had two fuel tanks, one of 90 L (24 US gal) and the other of 230 L (61 US gal) capacity.

Both tracks and wheels were used for steering. The steering system was set up so that shallow turns used only the wheels, but brakes would be applied to the tracks the further the steering wheel was turned. The drive sprocket, like all German half-tracks, had rollers rather than the more common teeth. The rear suspension consisted of six double sets of overlapping, interleaved Schachtellaufwerk layout roadwheels mounted on swing arms sprung by torsion bars. An idler wheel, mounted at the rear of the vehicle, was used to control track tension. The front wheels had leaf springs and shock absorbers.

The upper body had a crew compartment common to all versions. This had bench seats, one for the driver and his assistant, and another for the crew. The rear portion of the upper body was adapted for the vehicle's intended role. The artillery model had two extra bench seats for the gun's crew and space for its ammunition. The cargo version had just two storage compartments mounted in the front of the cargo compartment, one on each side, that opened to the outside. The windshield could fold forward and was also removable. A convertible canvas top was mounted at the upper part of the rear body. It fastened to the windshield when erected.

The Sd.Kfz. 9 was designed to have a towing capacity of 28 tonnes (28 long tons; 31 short tons). This was adequate for medium tanks such as the Panzer IV, but two, or even three or four, were necessary for heavier vehicles such as the Tiger I, Panther or King Tiger. It towed Sd.Anh 116 low-loader trailers to carry disabled vehicles.

All were equipped with a winch, mounted in the middle of the vehicle, just under the cargo platform.

== Design and development ==
Preliminary design of all the German half-tracks of the early part of the war was done by Dipl.Ing. Ernst Kniepkamp of the Military Automotive Department (Wa Prüf 6) before the Nazis took power in 1933. His designs were then turned over to commercial firms for development and testing. Fahrzeug- und Motorenbau GmbH (FAMO) of Breslau received the contract for the 18 t (18 long tons; 20 short tons) heavy towing tracked vehicle. Their first prototype, the FM gr 1, was completed in 1936. It had a 200 horsepower (150 kW) Maybach HL98 TUK engine and was only 7.7 metres (25 ft) long. The F 2 prototype appeared in 1938, but differed only in detail from its predecessor.

The F 3 appeared in 1939 and was the production version. The design was simplified throughout the war to reduce costs and the use of strategic metals. Some vehicles produced by Tatra had its 12-cylinder, air-cooled Type 103 diesel engine fitted. Large spades were added at the rear of the chassis during the war to improve the vehicle's ability to recover tanks and other heavy vehicles.

=== Variants ===
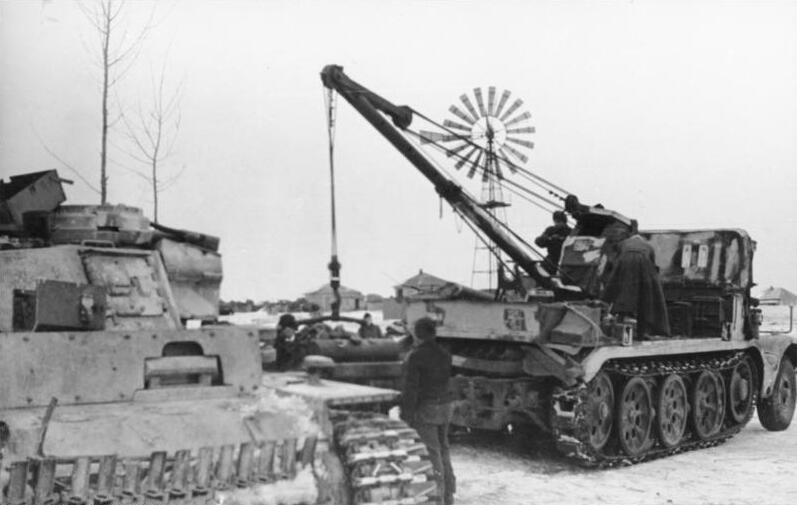
A Sd.Kfz. 9/1 hoisting a Maybach HL 120 TRM engine into a Panzer III in the Soviet Union, January 1943

A new upper body was used for the Sd.Kfz. 9/1 which mounted a 6 t (5.9 long tons; 6.6 short tons) capacity crane in lieu of the crew's bench seat and the cargo compartment. It was issued to tank maintenance units beginning in September 1941. A larger, gasoline-electric, 10 t (9.8 long tons; 11 short tons) crane was fitted on the later Sd.Kfz. 9/2. This required outriggers to stabilize the vehicle before operations could begin. There was also a tank recovery version with a giant spade-like metal plate connected to the rear of the frame. The spade holding frame could be lifted straight up for transport. It was meant to stabilize the vehicle while winching a heavy object on soft ground.

8.8 cm Flak 18 anti-aircraft guns were mounted on fifteen Sd.Kfz. 9s in 1940 as the 8.8 cm Flak 18 (Sfl.) auf Zugkraftwagen 18t (Sd.Kfz. 9) for anti-tank duties. The crew and engine compartments were lightly (14.5 mm (0.57 in)), but completely, armored, which limited the gun's ability to fire directly ahead. A platform with drop-down sides was fitted for the gun. Outriggers were necessary to brace the platform sides to support the weight of the gun crew. The vehicle weighed 25 t (25 long tons; 28 short tons), was 9.32 m (30.6 ft) long, 3.67 m (12 ft) tall and 2.65 m (8 ft 8 in) wide. One source claims that these vehicles were produced as prototypes in 1943.

== Production ==
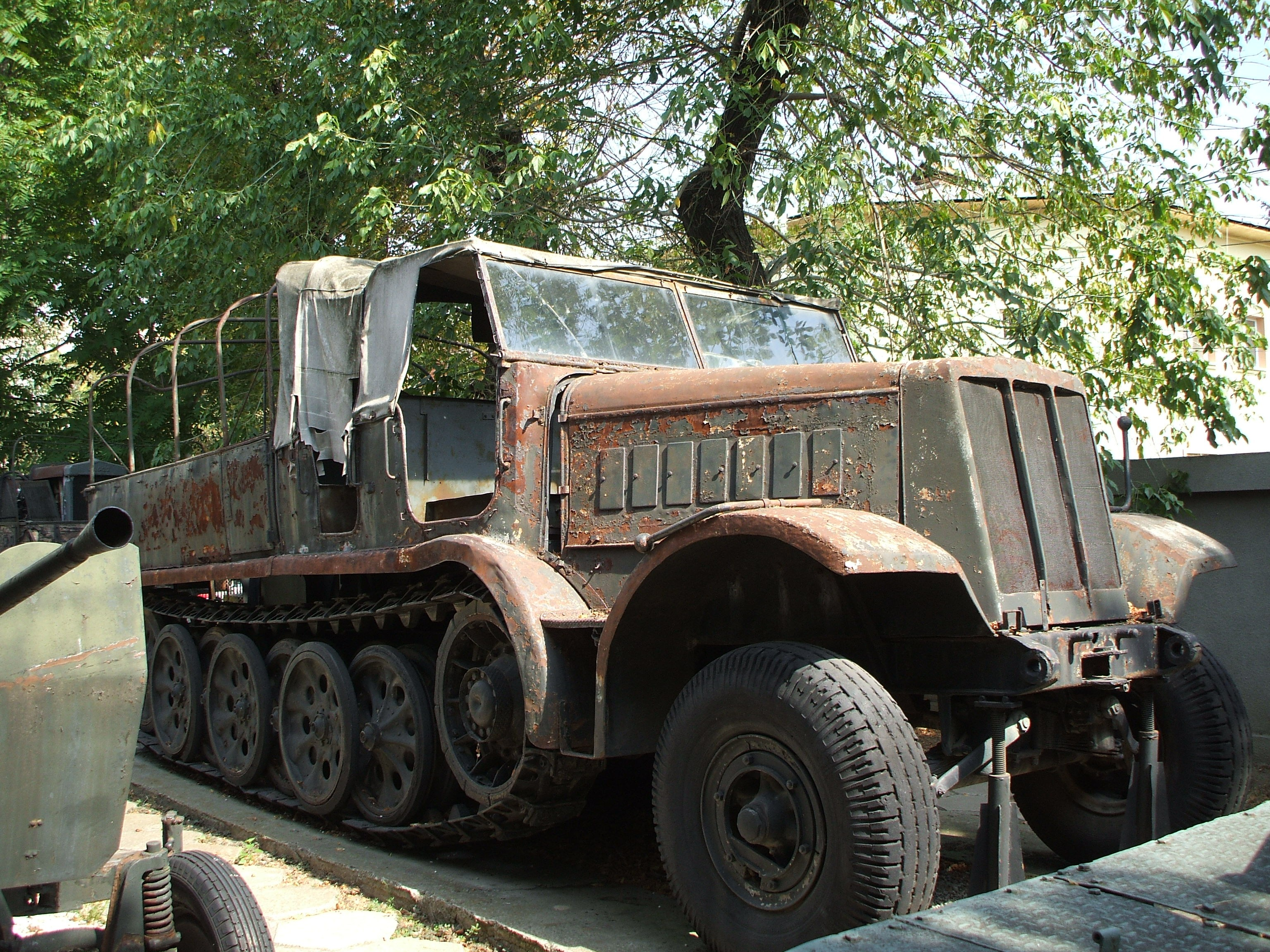
Sd.Kfz. 9 on display at the National Military Museum, Bucharest

Vomag of Plauen began producing the Sd.Kfz. 9 in 1940 and Tatra joined in the last years of the war. 855 were on hand on 20 December 1942. 643 were built in 1943 and 834 in 1944. Approximately 2,500 were built in total.

== See also ==
- Sd.Kfz. 4
- Sd.Kfz. 6
- Sd.Kfz. 7
- Sd.Kfz. 8
- Sd.Kfz. 10
- Sd.Kfz. 11
- Sd.Kfz. 250
- Sd.Kfz. 251

== Bibliography ==
- Chamberlain, Peter; Doyle, Hilary L. (1978). Thomas L. Jentz (ed.). Encyclopedia of German Tanks of World War Two: A Complete Illustrated Directory of German Battle Tanks, Armoured Cars, Self-propelled Guns, and Semi-tracked Vehicles, 1933–1945 (revised 1993 ed.). London: Arms and Armour Press. ISBN 1-85409-214-6.
- Spielberger, Walter J. (2008). Halftracked Vehicles of the German Army 1909-1945. Atlgen, PA: Schiffer. ISBN 978-0-7643-2942-5.
