= Sd.Kfz. 6 =

Sd.Kfz. 6 (Sonderkraftfahrzeug 6)
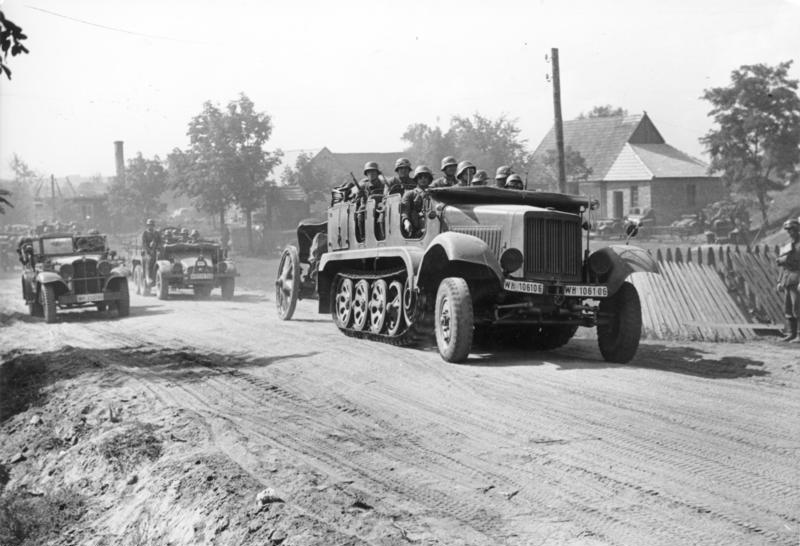
- Sd.Kfz. 6/1 towing 10.5 cm leFH 18 howitzer, Poland, 1939
- Type: Half-track
- Place of origin: Nazi Germany

Service history
- In service: 1939–1945

Production history
- Designer: Büssing-NAG
- Designed: 1934–1939
- Manufacturer: Büssing-NAG, Daimler-Benz, Praga
- Unit cost: 30,000 ℛ︁ℳ︁
- Produced: 1939–1944
- No. built: 3,500

Specifications (Sd.Kfz 6/1)
- Mass: 8,500 kg (18,700 lb)
- Length: 6.325 m (20 ft 9.0 in)
- Width: 2.2 m (7 ft 3 in)
- Height: 2.48 m (8 ft 2 in)
- Crew: 12 - 15
- Engine: 5.4L Maybach HL54 TUKRM I6; 115 hp (86 kW)
- Power/weight: 12.8 hp/tonne
- Suspension: torsion bar suspension
- Ground clearance: 40 cm (16 in)
- Operational range: 320 km (200 mi) (road); 160 km (100 mi) (off-road)
- Maximum speed: 50 km/h (31 mph) (road)

The Sd.Kfz. 6 (Sonderkraftfahrzeug (Note: Meaning "special purpose vehicle", Sd.Kfz numbers were used for inventory designation of German military vehicles) 6) was a half-track military vehicle used by the German Wehrmacht during the Second World War. It was designed to be used as the main towing vehicle for the 10.5 cm leFH 18 howitzer.

== Development ==
Development of a new medium artillery tractor began in 1934 at Büssing-NAG, in Berlin. The vehicle, produced in around 750 units until 1942, could carry up to 11 men in three rows, covered by a canvas structure. As well as a tractor for the 10.5 leFH 18 howitzer, the vehicle was to be used to tow heavy equipment for engineer units. Production was carried out by both Büssing-NAG and Daimler-Benz.

== Description ==
The engine used gave 90–115 hp (67–86 kW), depending on the production version. Sd.Kfz. 6 was used by the various German military forces (Army, Waffen-SS, Luftwaffe) for the entire war.

== Variants ==
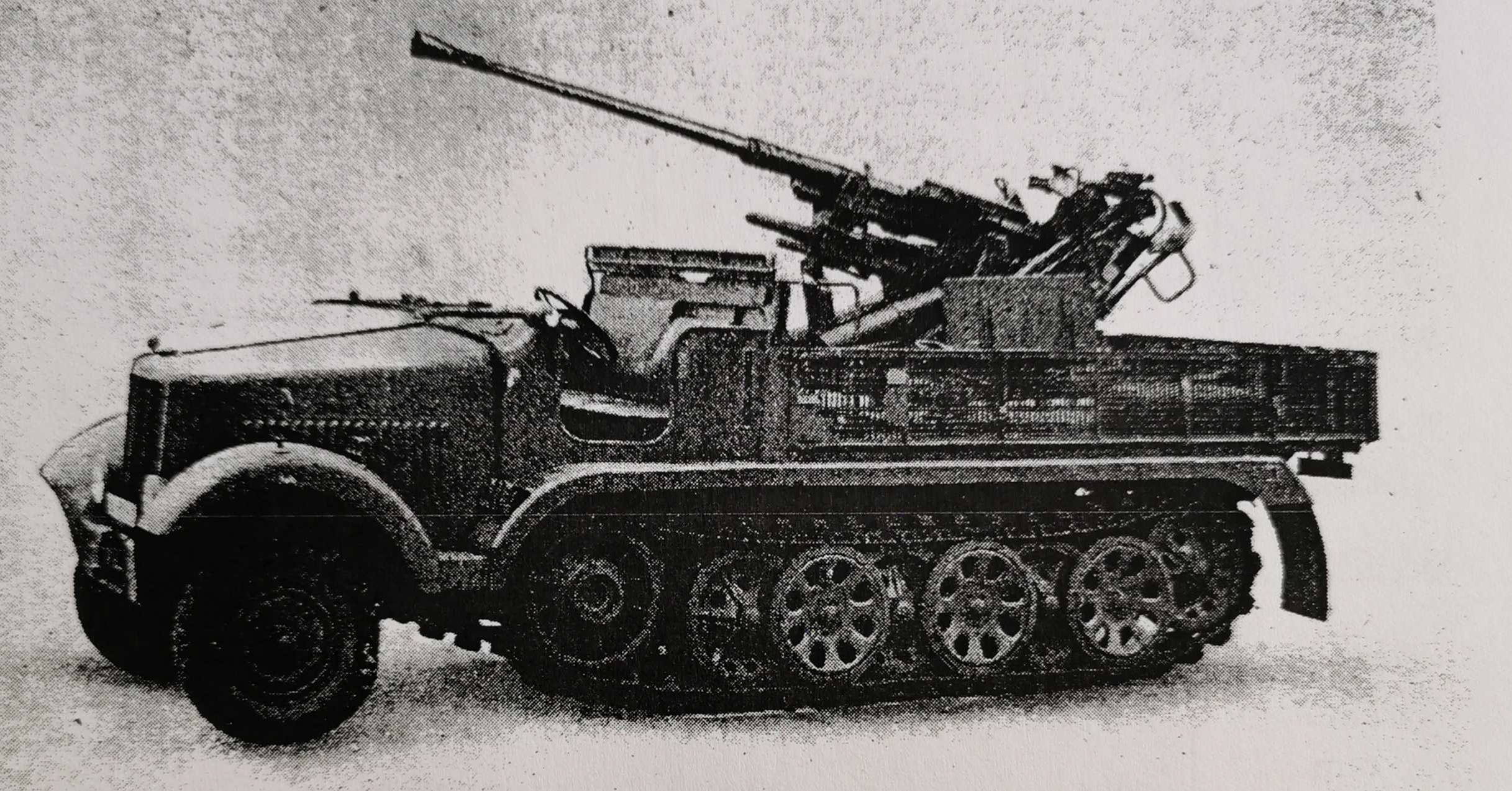
Sd kfz 6/2

- Sd.Kfz. 6

Standard half-tracked vehicle for Pioneers, used for towing Pioneer equipment and transporting fifteen men.

- Sd.Kfz. 6/1

Standard half-tracked vehicle for Artillery, used for towing artillery pieces and transporting 10 men plus 500 kg equipment.

- Sd.Kfz. 6/2 3,7 cm FlaK36 auf Fahrgestell Zugkraftwagen 5t

A Sd.Kfz. 6 fitted with a 3.7 cm Flak 36 anti-aircraft gun, sides would fold down to allow space to work on. Crew of seven., with three loaders and two gunners in the back, with the rest in the front. 203 vehicles were produced for the Luftwaffe from 1939 to 1941. The gun had an elevation of -8° to +85°.

- Sd.Kfz. 6/3 7,62 cm FK 296(r) auf Selbstfahrlafette Zugkraftwagen 5t

A Panzerjaeger constructed from a Sd.Kfz. 6 carrying a captured Soviet 76mm F-22 gun portée within an armoured superstructure. The gun was emplaced on the rear on its field carriage and 5 mm (0.20 in) thick armour plates were added to the sides and rear to augment the protection given by the gun shield. Nine were produced in 1941-42

== See also ==
- Sd.Kfz. 7
- Sd.Kfz. 8
- Sd.Kfz. 9
- Sd.Kfz. 10
- Sd.Kfz. 11
- Sd.Kfz. 250
- Sd.Kfz. 251
