= Sd.Kfz. 7 =

mittlerer Zugkraftwagen 8t, Sd.Kfz. 7
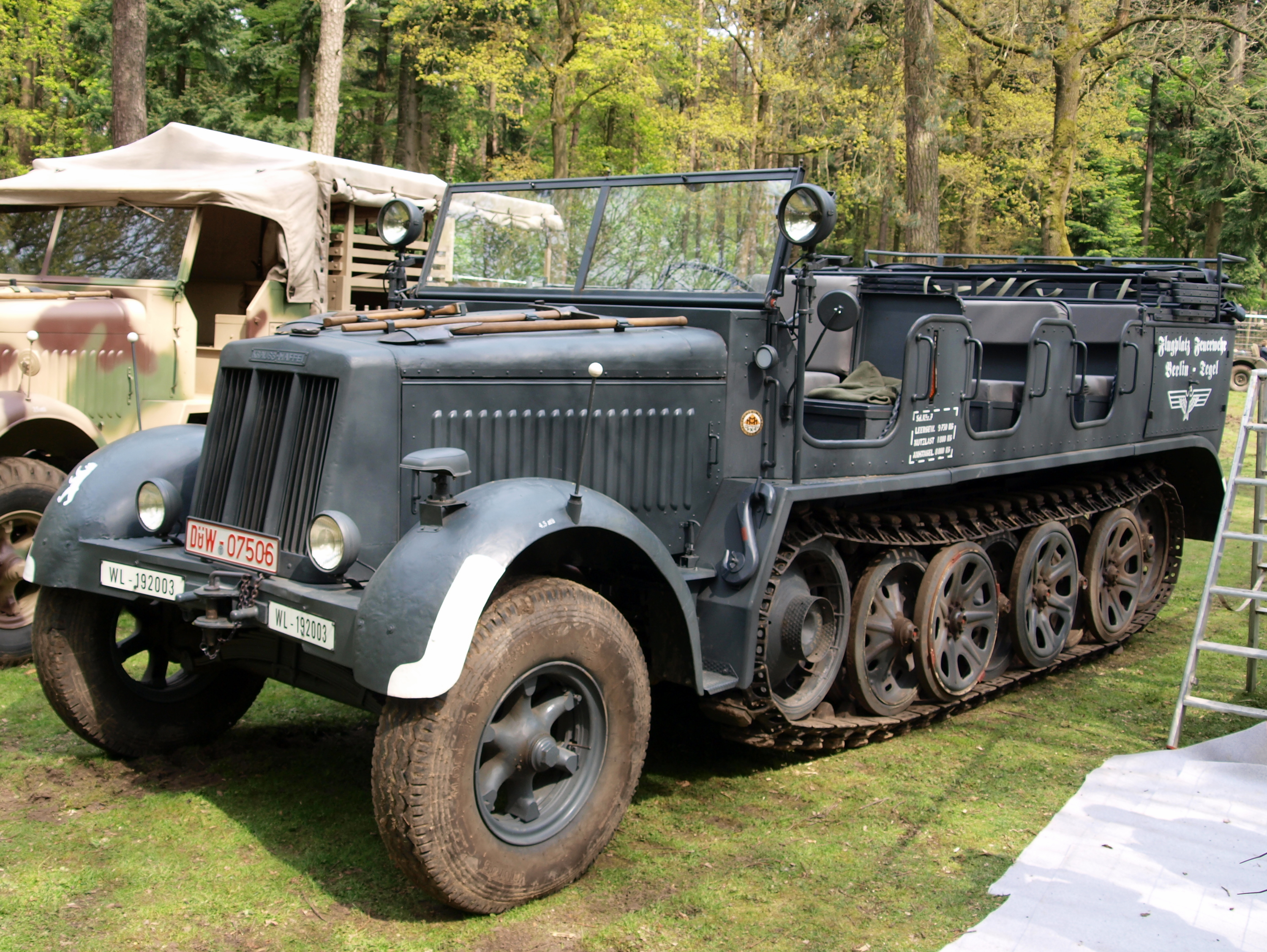
- Sd.Kfz. 7 on Militracks 2010, Overloon
- Type: Half-tracked artillery tractor
- Place of origin: Nazi Germany

Service history
- In service: 1938–1945 (Nazi Germany)
- Used by: Nazi Germany, Italy, Romania, Bulgaria, Czechoslovakia (postwar), Allies (postwar)
- Wars: World War II

Production history
- Designer: Krauss-Maffei
- Designed: 1934
- Manufacturer: Krauss-Maffei, Borgward, Österreichische Saurer-Werke AG, Breda (Breda 61)
- Unit cost: 36,000 Reichsmark
- Produced: 1938–1944
- No. built: 12,187
- Variants: Sd.Kfz. 7/1, Sd.Kfz. 7/2, Feuerleitpanzer auf Zugkraftwagen 8t, Breda 61

Specifications
- Mass: 11.53 tonnes
- Length: 6.85 m (22 ft 6 in)
- Width: 2.35 m (7 ft 9 in)
- Height: 2.62 m (8 ft 7 in)
- Crew: 1 driver
- Passengers: 11
- Engine: 6.2L Maybach HL62 TUK I6; 135 PS (133 hp)
- Power/weight: 12.1 hp/tonne
- Payload capacity: 1,800 kg
- Suspension: Torsion bar
- Fuel capacity: 215 liters
- Operational range: 250 km (160 mi) on roads 120 km (75 mi) off-road
- Maximum speed: 50 km/h (31 mph) on roads

The Sd.Kfz. 7 was a half-track military vehicle used by the German Army, Luftwaffe and Waffen-SS during the Second World War. Sd.Kfz. is an abbreviation of the German word Sonderkraftfahrzeug, "special purpose vehicle". A longer designation is mittlerer Zugkraftwagen 8t, Sd.Kfz. 7, "medium towing motor vehicle 8t".

== Development ==
Development of the Sd.Kfz. 7 can be traced back to a 1934 Wehrmacht requirement for an eight-tonne (8.3 tons) half-track. Various trial vehicles were built by Krauss-Maffei from 1934 to 1938. The production vehicle first appeared in 1938 and was intended to be used mainly as the tractor for the 8.8 cm FlaK gun and the 15 cm sFH 18 150 mm howitzer. Production was stopped in 1944. The vehicle was made by Krauss-Maffei in Munich, the Saurerwerke in Vienna and the Borgward works at Bremen.

== Description ==
The vehicle could carry gun crews of up to 12 men in theatre-type seats. Under the seats was storage room for various tools, and the whole vehicle was spacious enough to carry their kit. The rear of the vehicle housed an enclosed compartment for storage of ammunition, though a second ammunition carrier was desirable. The tractor could tow loads up to 8,000 kg (17,600 lb) in weight. Most were fitted with a winch that could pull up to 3450 kg. It had a payload of 1800 kg. The windscreen was able to fold down and a canvas roof could be erected. A number were also constructed with a hard top, but this was less common in service. A later simplified type appeared with a timber frame truck-type layout, the ammunition being stored behind the driver's station and the gun crew having space on wooden benches behind.

The running gear consisted of two front wheels with hydro-pneumatic tires for steering and a track each side with 14 road wheels—7 per side, overlapping and interleaved in the common Schachtellaufwerk design for German half-tracks—on each side of the vehicle; a drive sprocket was located at the front of each track system. Minor variations on the track and road wheel design and manufacture took place throughout the course of service, some being combined in the field as repairs took place. In 1943, the Maybach HL62 engine was replaced with a Maybach HL64.

It was used as a recovery vehicle for lightly armored vehicles.

== Combat use ==
=== German Army ===
The use of half-tracked prime movers for artillery was common in the German forces but not elsewhere. Compared to wheeled vehicles, half-tracks are more difficult to maintain, they often suffer track breakages, and are slower on roads. However, they have better off-road mobility compared to wheeled vehicles.

The Sd.Kfz.7 was used throughout the war. They were seen during the 1940 Paris victory parade and the Sd.Kfz. 7 features in much German wartime propaganda footage, contributing to the myth of the mechanized Blitzkrieg. In fact, while produced in large numbers, there were never enough to fully equip the German forces. Typically, like many other types, the artillery elements of Panzer and mechanized infantry units (Panzergrenadier) received them, while other units continued to rely on horses to draw their guns.

The Sd.Kfz. 7 saw extensive use in the North African Campaign where their tracks allowed them to drive through the desert sands far more effectively than trucks. Often, columns carrying troops or POWs would include at least two half tracks with one generally riding point in order to make a path through the sands that the trucks could follow.

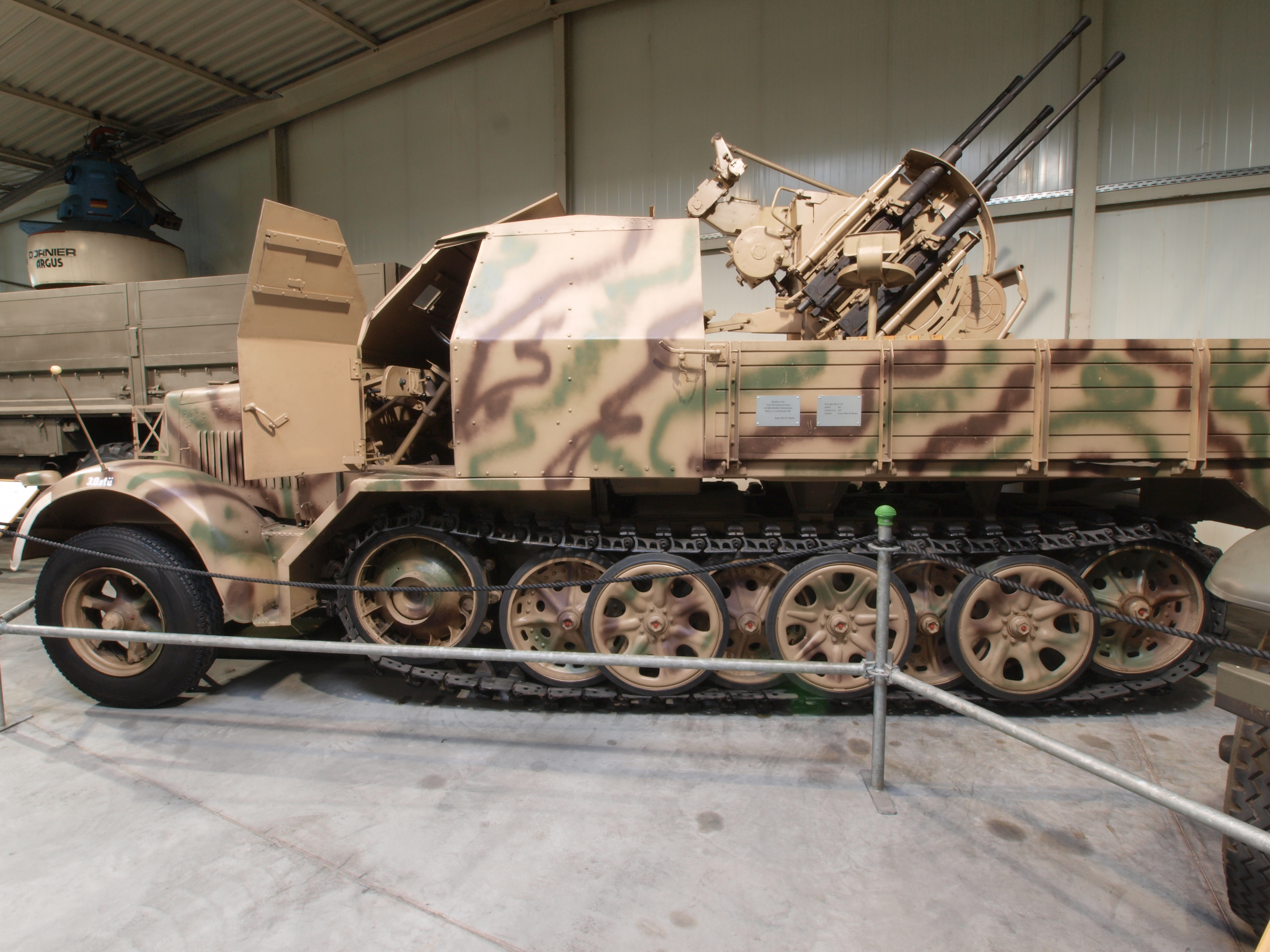
Sd.Kfz. 7/1 at the Wehrtechnische Studiensammlung Koblenz

The Sd.Kfz. 7 also became the basis of a number of self-propelled anti-aircraft variants based on 20 mm and 37 mm flak types in use. The Sd.Kfz. 7/1 was armed with a 2 cm Flakvierling 38 quadruple anti-aircraft gun system. The Sd.Kfz. 7/2 was armed with a single 3.7 cm FlaK 36 anti-aircraft gun. On many of these variants, the driver's position and the engine cover was armored (8 mm thickness). There were also conversions made mounting a single 2 cm anti-aircraft gun. Trial vehicles mounting a 5 cm FlaK 41 were produced but proved unsuccessful, and did not enter serial production.

A variant with an armored superstructure based on the Sd.Kfz. 7, the Feuerleitpanzer auf Zugkraftwagen 8t, was used by launch crews of the V-2 ballistic missile. This was necessary as the V-2 sometimes malfunctioned and exploded on the launch pad. It was also used to tow the launch pad into place. Bunkers were not used as the V-2 was transported to widely dispersed launchpads by carriage on Meillerwagen trailers that could erect them atop the launchstands/flame deflectors that each dispersed launchpad facility was equipped with for surprise launches, to avoid Allied air attacks.

=== Other armies ===
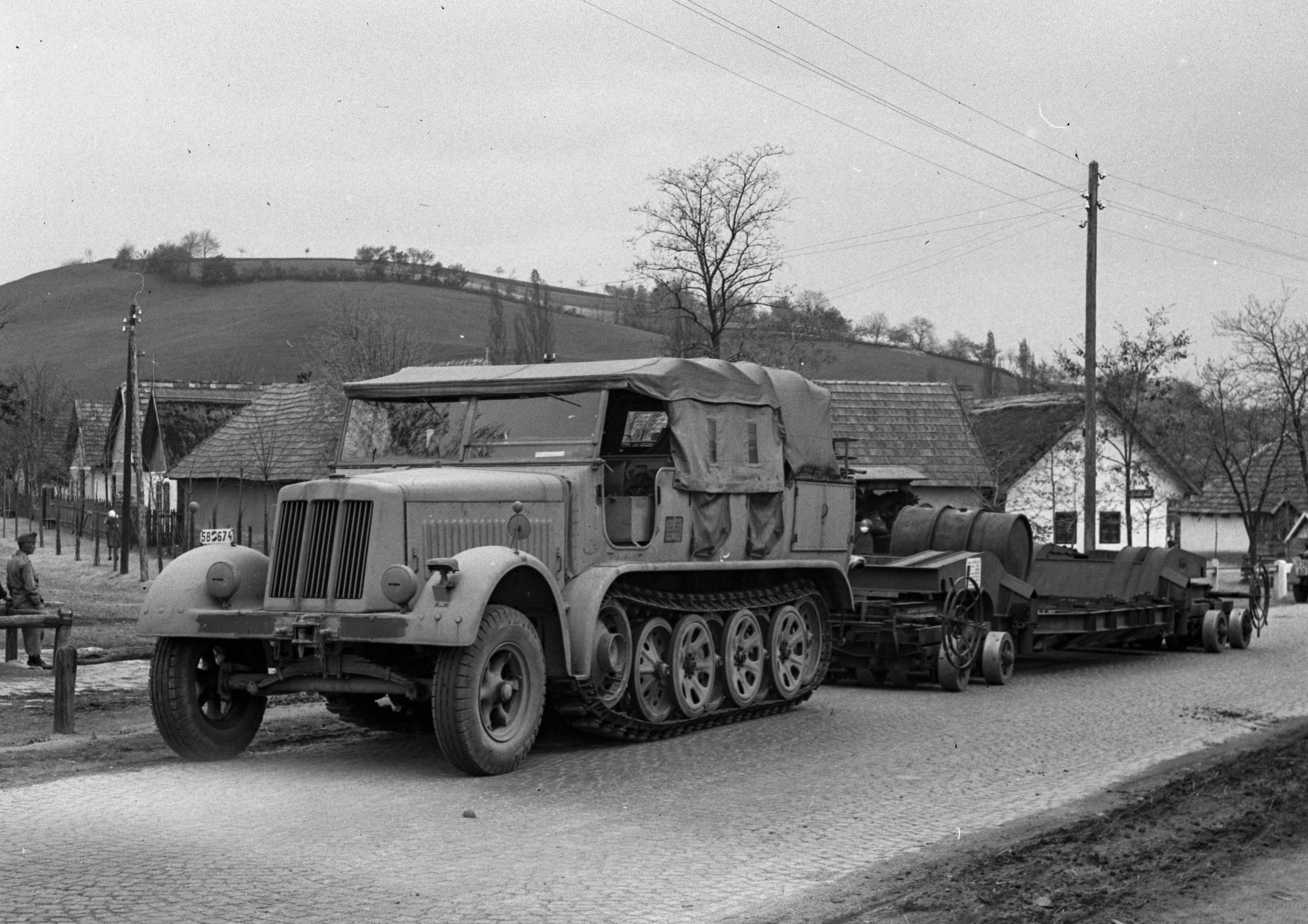
A Sd. Kfz. 7 of the Royal Hungarian Army towing road trailer, Hungary 1944

In 1943, Italy received a total of 36 Sd.Kfz.7 as part of the German equipments for the Armored Division "M".

A licensed Italian-manufactured copy was built during the war (designated Breda 61, 250 produced 1943-1944) and is easily recognized by its longer hood and right-hand-drive steering.

=== British improved copy ===
In 1943, the Ministry of Supply supplied Bedford Motors (a subsidiary of Vauxhall Motors) with Sd.Kfz. 7 and Sd.Kfz. 8 half-tracks captured during the North African Campaign and put them through trials, with the aim of creating a similar vehicle. After a year, Vauxhall's Luton plant created a new vehicle, designated the Bedford Tractor (BT) and codenamed Traclat (Tracked Light Artillery Tractor). This was to be a 'go anywhere' artillery tractor for 17 pounder, 25 pounder and Bofors 40 mm guns but, so far as possible, built using existing parts and production capacity. 7,500 were ordered in 1944, and 5,000 were ordered in 1945, but these were cancelled after the war in Europe ended so only six prototypes were completed.

The Traclat was powered by two off-the-shelf 3.5 liter, 72 hp six-cylinder Bedford engines mounted side-by-side and geared to a common shaft to produce a combined 136 hp with a maximum speed of 30 mph. Unlike the German vehicle, where the front wheel bore the strain until full lock, the Traclat adjusted the drive to the track and wheels at the same time. Everything was re-engineered for British imperial units, and while the track pattern looked similar to the German ones, the bogies used imperial measurements and the overlapping wheels were a mix of different German designs. Due to these changes there was basically no compatibility between parts for the BT and the Sd. Kfz. 7.

In some ways the Traclat was superior to its progenitor: the ammunition lockers were accessible from outside of the vehicle and it also had power-assisted steering. By early 1945 Vauxhall Motors had supplied prototypes to the Fighting Vehicle Proving Establishment (FVPE) for official trials in conditions ranging from arctic to tropical and the vehicles proved excellent, being able to climb a one-in-two gradient and wade in water six feet deep; however, the war ended before mass production could be contemplated.

In July 1946, the test vehicle was required to tow a 25-pounder gun and limber, pitted against a Crusader artillery tractor and an Alecto self-propelled gun. While the Traclat gave the best performance, it bogged down in mud. A number of vehicles were shipped to Germany for more trials but this came to nothing, due to excessive cost, and because existing tractors were coping with combat conditions in Western Europe, there was no longer any requirement for series production. The paired standard Bedford engines produced a combined 136 bhp, with a combined fuel consumption of 3.5mpg(1.27 km/litre). The Traclat achieved a maximum road speed of 30 mph (48 km/h).

=== Allied use of Sd Kfz 7 ===
Some Sd.Kfz. 7 were taken into service by the Allies after the Second World War. The Czechoslovak Army used them for some years after the war.

In The Tank Museum, Dorset, UK, there is a detailed evaluation of a captured Sd.Kfz. 7 produced by Vauxhall Motors in 1942, pursuant to the Traclat project mentioned above.

== Variants ==
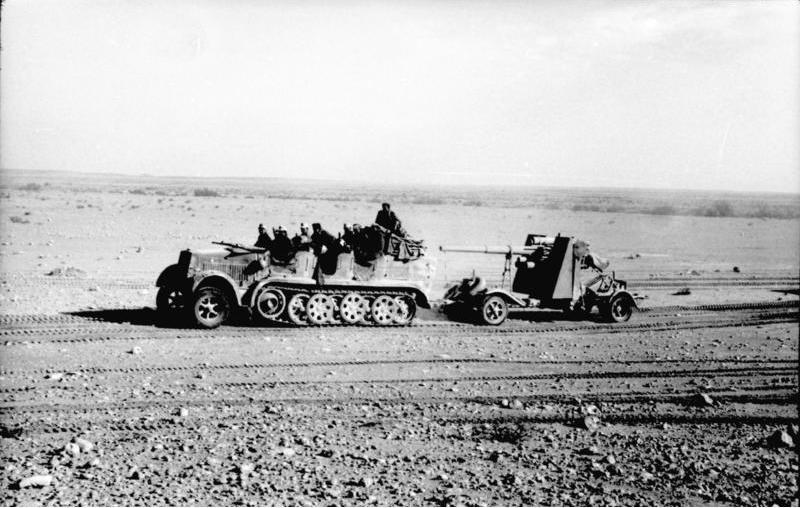
A SdKfz. 7 as a prime mover of a 8,8cm Flak 37

Sd.Kfz. 7
Basic Sd.Kfz. 7 prime mover, with open bodywork and theatre-type seating for gun crews. No armor.
Sd.Kfz. 7/1
Sd.Kfz. 7 armed with a 2 cm Flakvierling 38 L/65 quadruple anti-aircraft gun mounting, appearing with both open and armored cab. 750-800 produced by the end of December 1944
Sd.Kfz. 7/2
Sd.Kfz. 7 armed with a 3.7 cm FlaK 36 anti-aircraft gun (in 1944 switched to 3.7 cm FlaK 43). Again, both open and armored cab variants existed. About 1000 produced by the end of January 1945
Feuerleitpanzer auf Zugkraftwagen 8t
Observation and command post for the V-2 ballistic missile. Unknown numbers produced.
Breda 61
Breda-built licensed Italian copy, 250 produced 1943–1944.

== See also ==
- Sd.Kfz. 4
- Sd.Kfz. 6
- Sd.Kfz. 8
- Sd.Kfz. 9
- Sd.Kfz. 10
- Sd.Kfz. 11
- Sd.Kfz. 250
- Sd.Kfz. 251
