= List of military land vehicles of Germany =

List of German Tanks by type; includes both past and present vehicles

This is a list of German-made and German-used land vehicles sorted by type, covering both former and current vehicles, from their inception from the German Empire, through the Weimar Republic and Nazi Germany, to the split between West Germany and East Germany, through their reunification and into modern-day Germany.

== Light tanks ==
=== Out of service ===
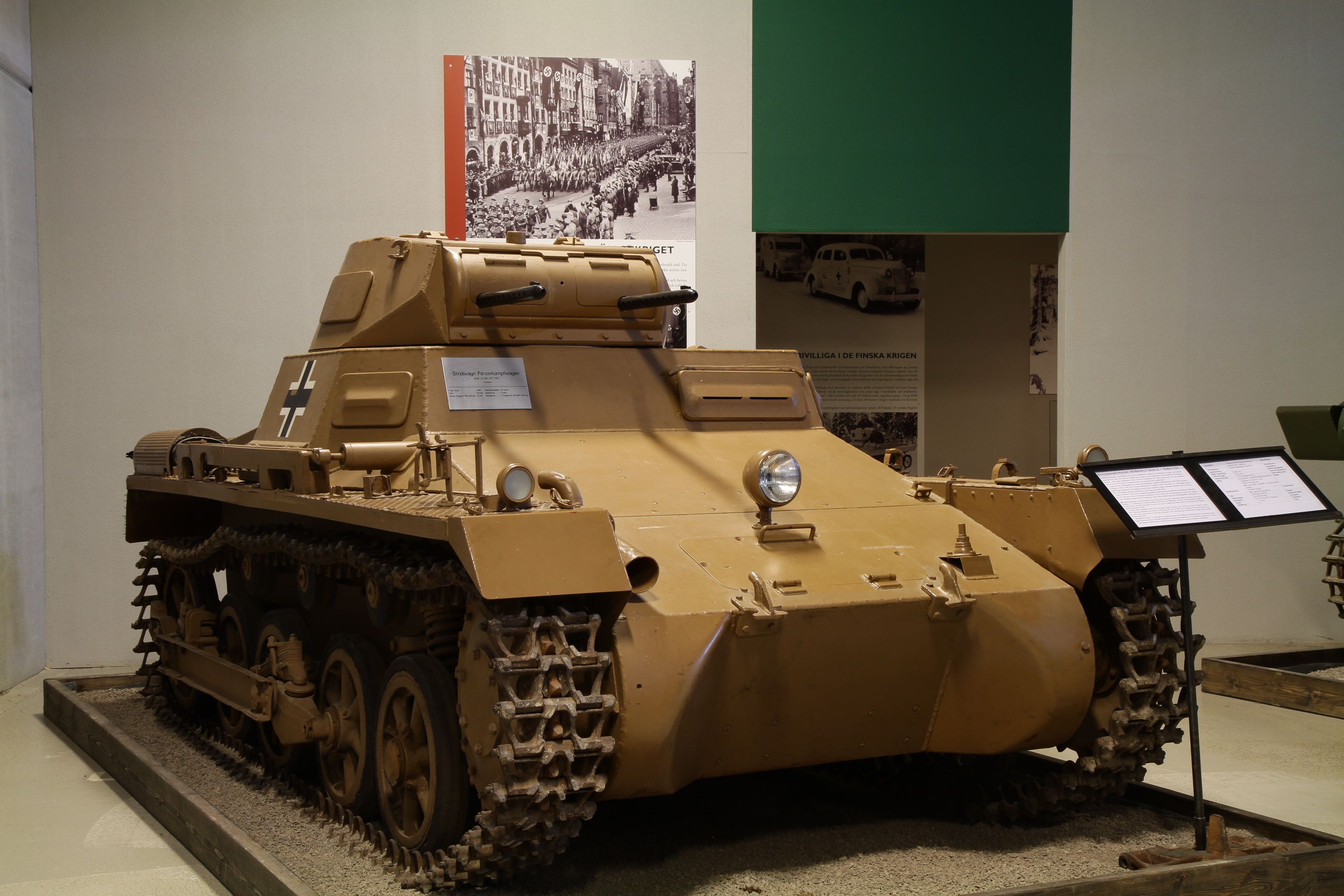
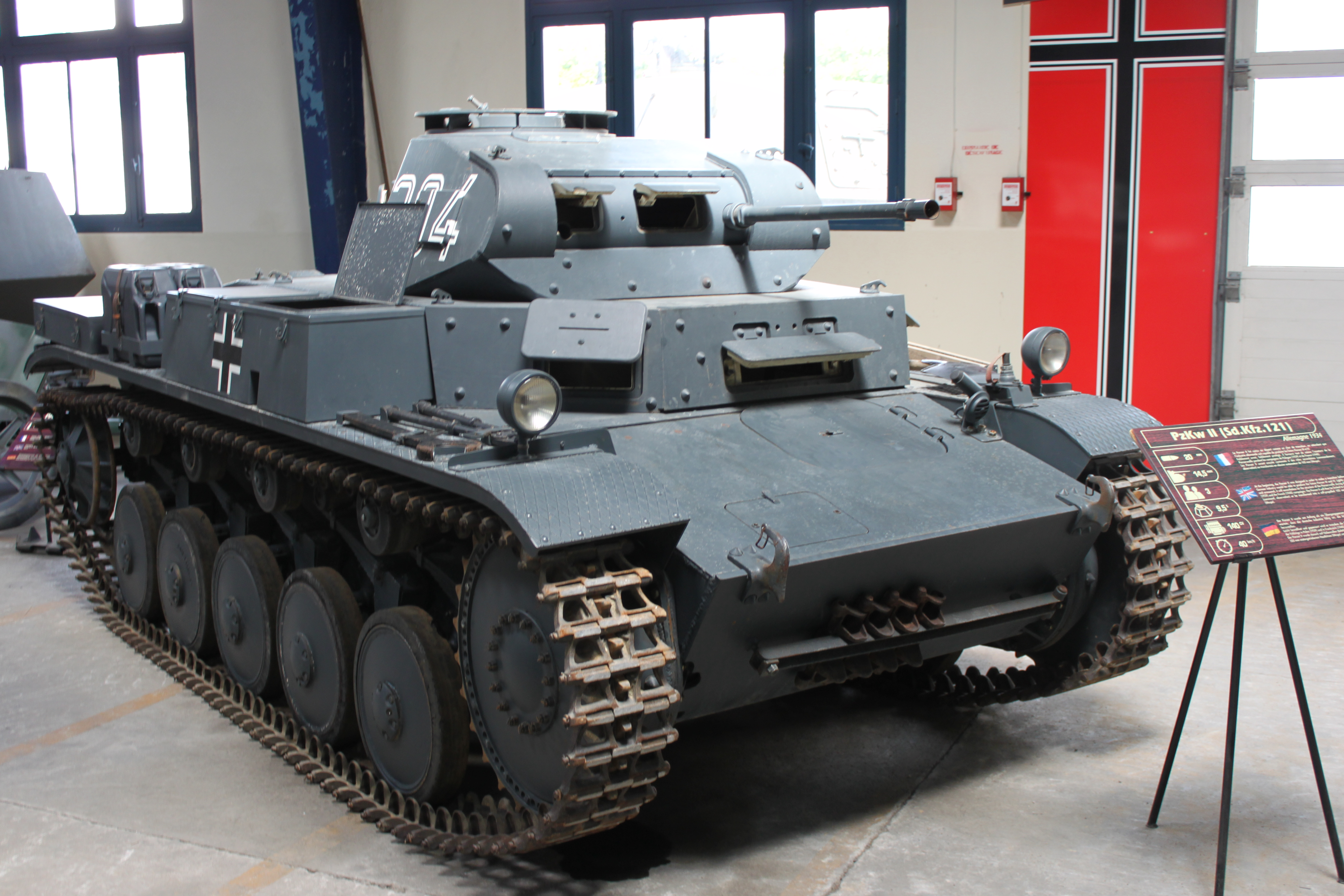
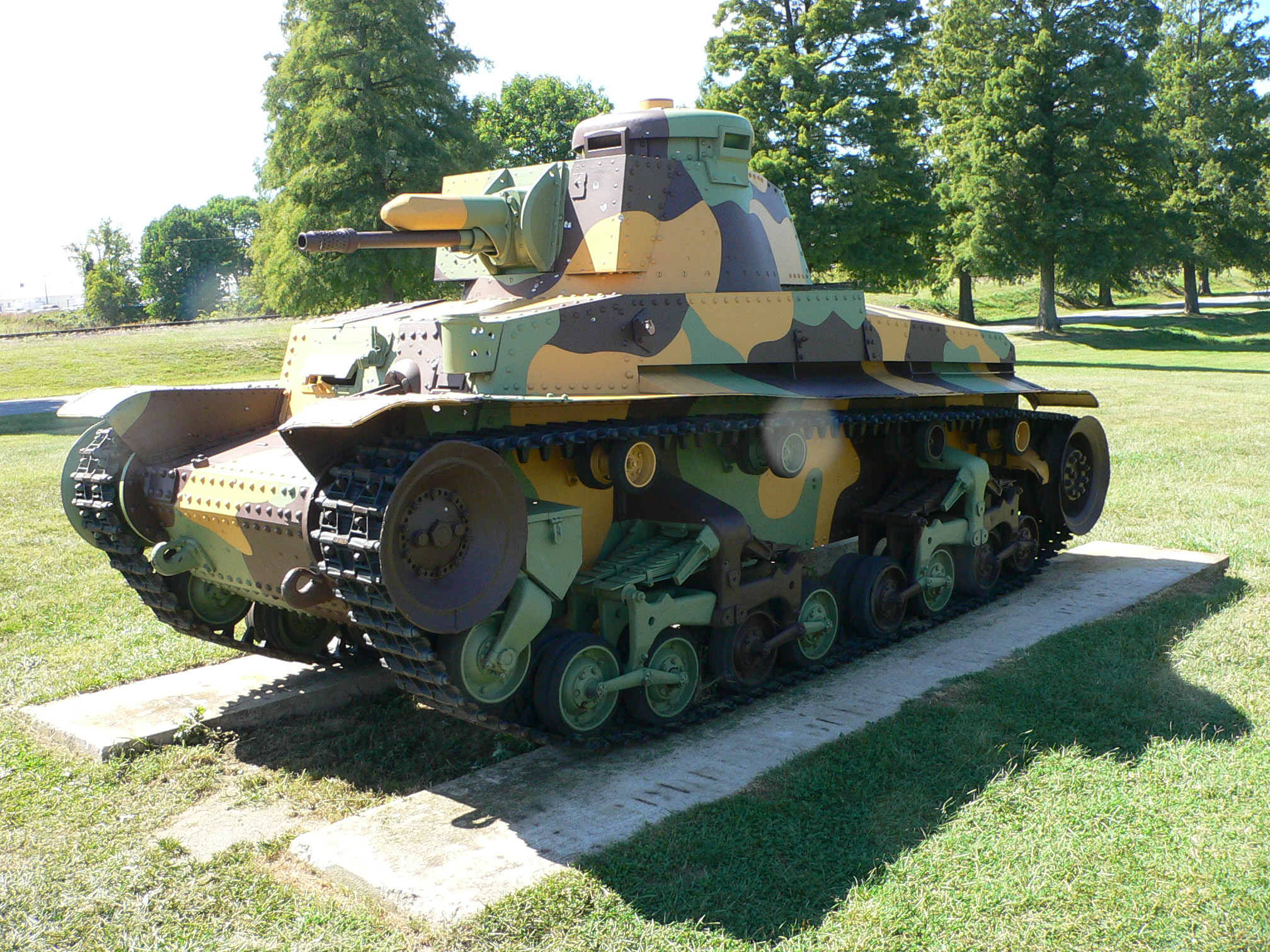
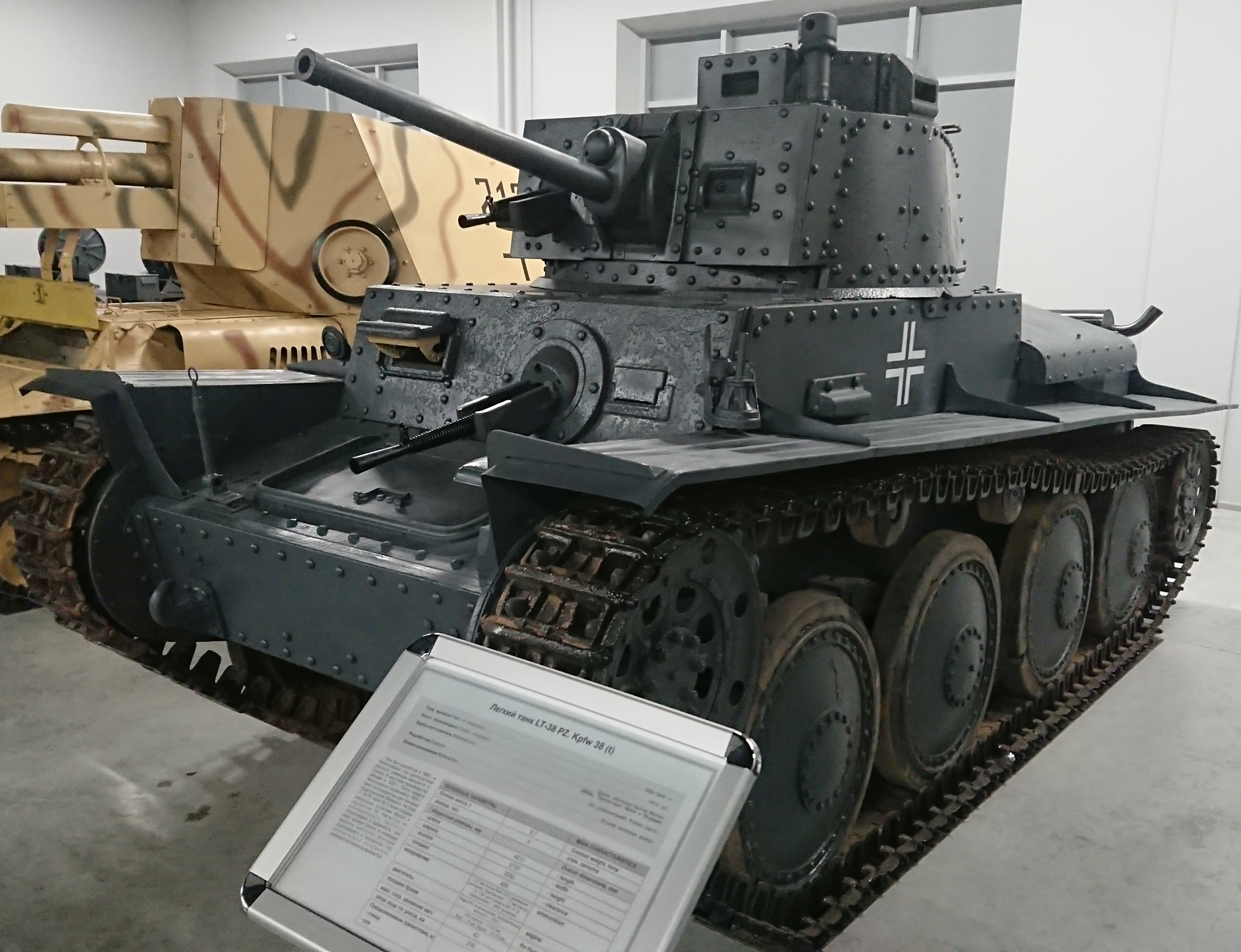
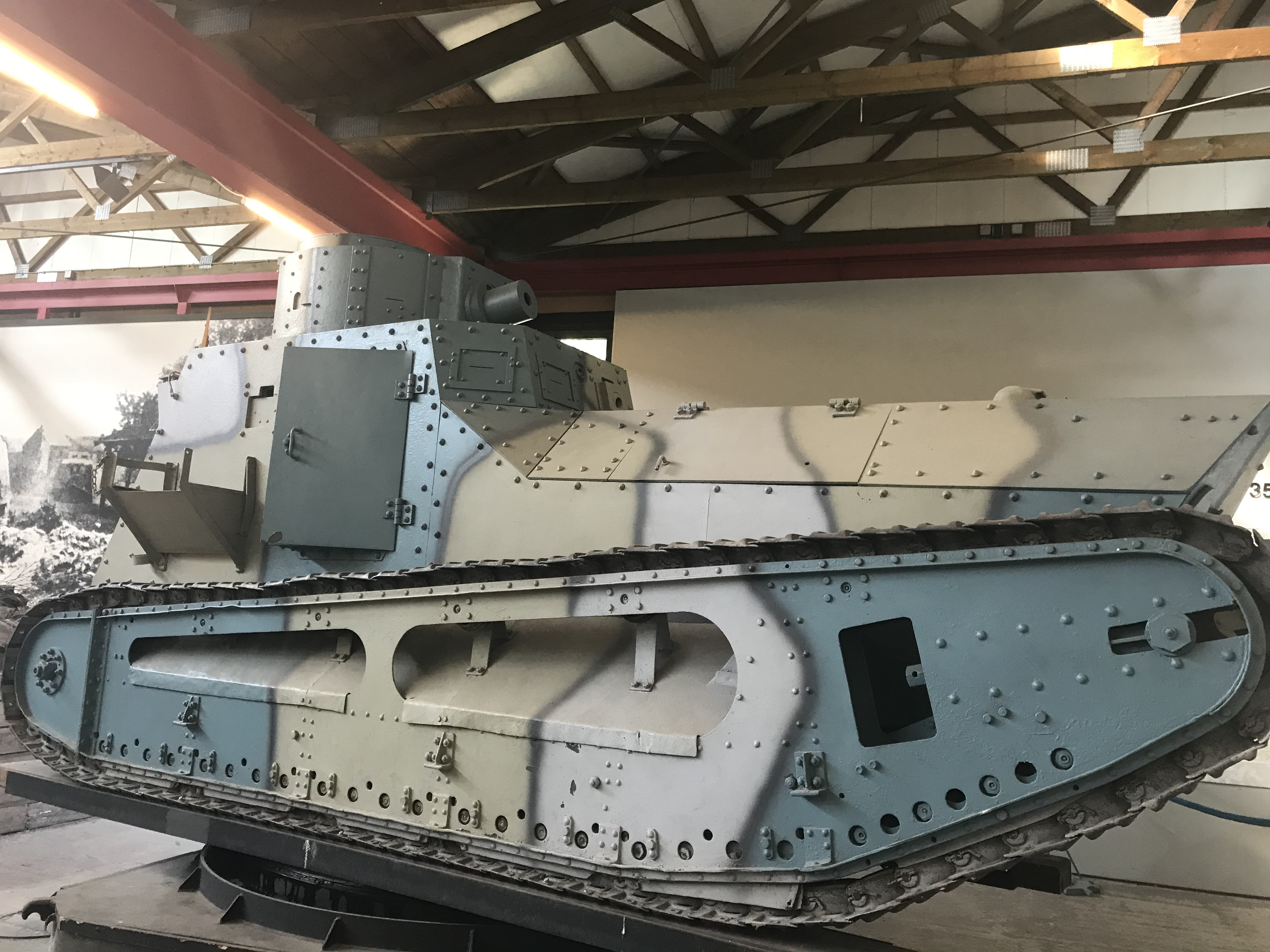
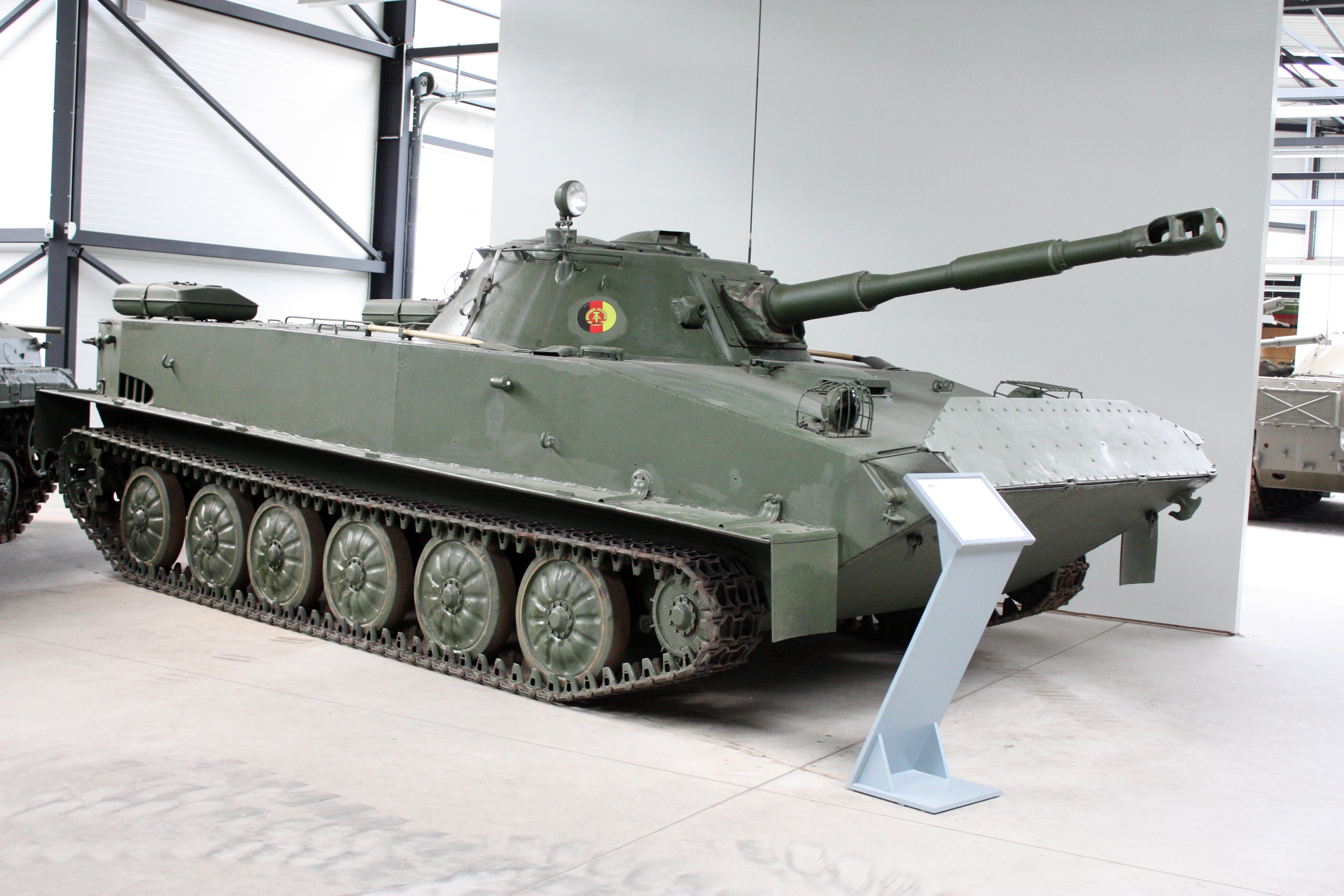
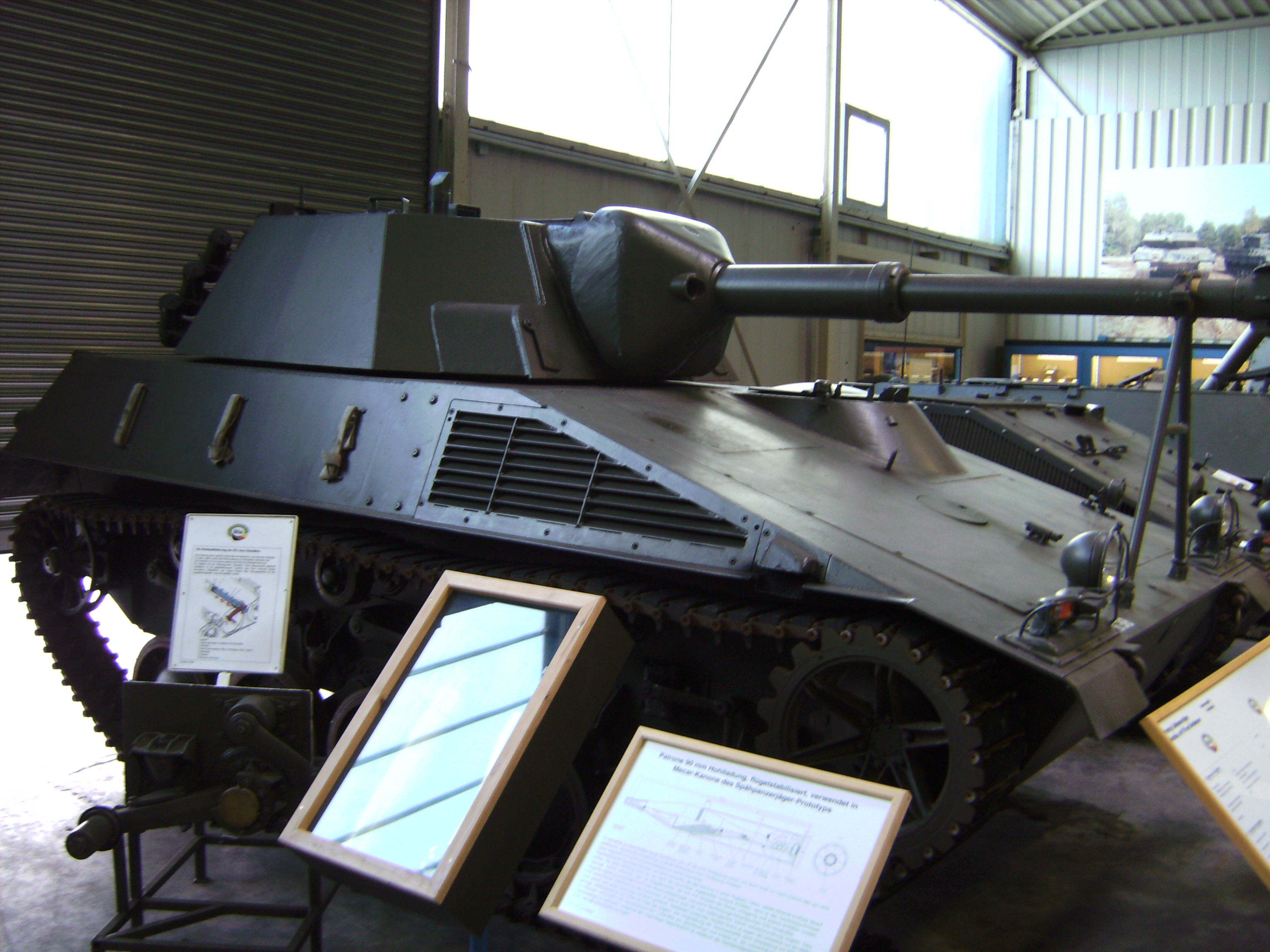
- Panzer I (and its variants)
  - Panzer I Ausf. C
  - Panzer I Ausf. F
- Panzer II
  - Panzer II Ausf. L "Luchs"
- Panzer 35(t)
- Panzer 38(t)
- Sd.Kfz. 265 Panzerbefehlswagen
- PT-76 (East Germany)

=== Experimental ===
- Sturmpanzerwagen Oberschlesien
- Kugelpanzer
- Marienwagen - Tank prototype
- Höchammer
- Landsverk L-5/M28
- LK I
- LK II
- Orion-Wagen
- Leichttraktor
- VK 16.02 Leopard
- Spähpanzer SP I.C.
- Spähpanzer Ru 251

== Medium tanks ==
=== Out of service ===
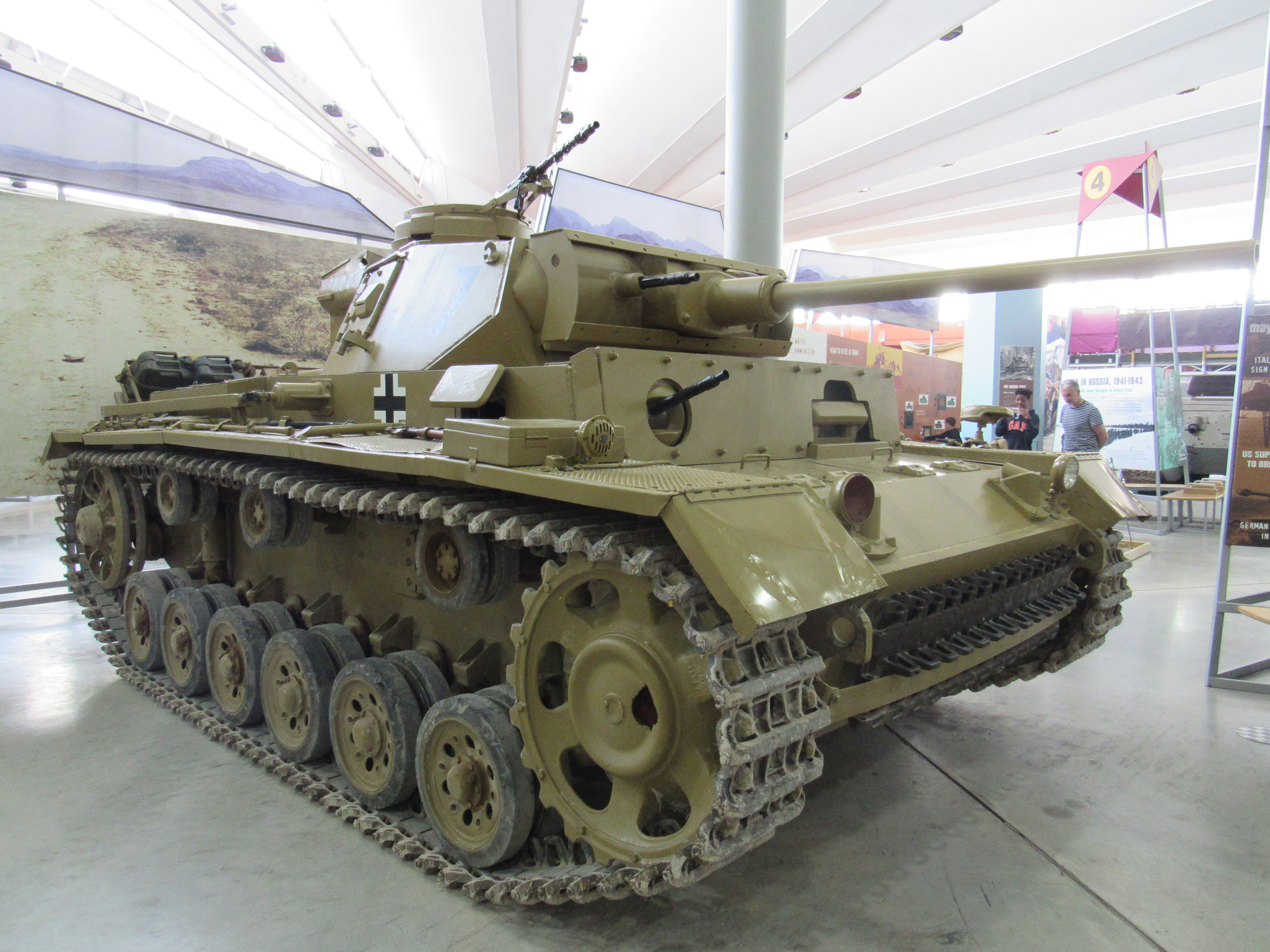
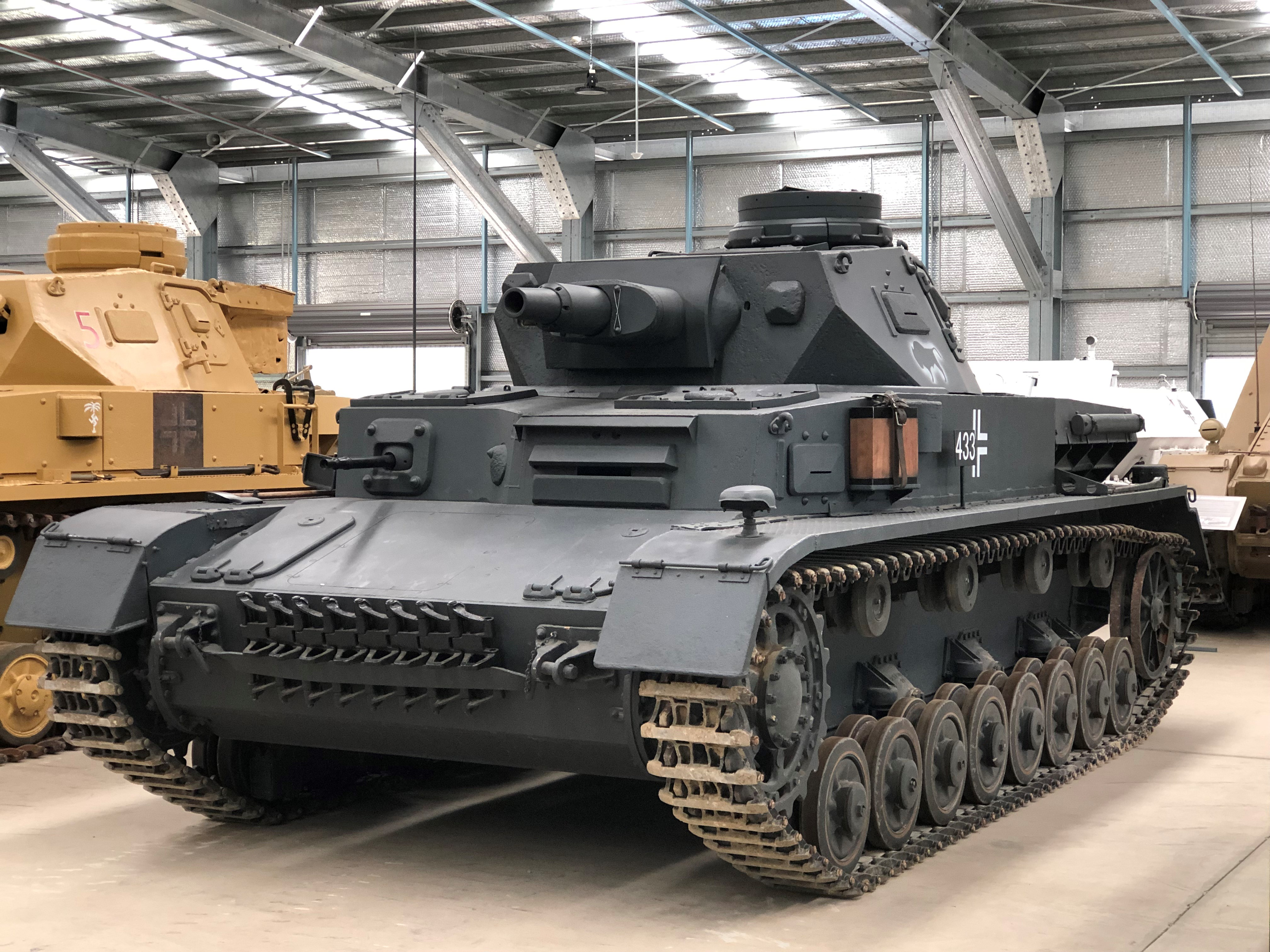
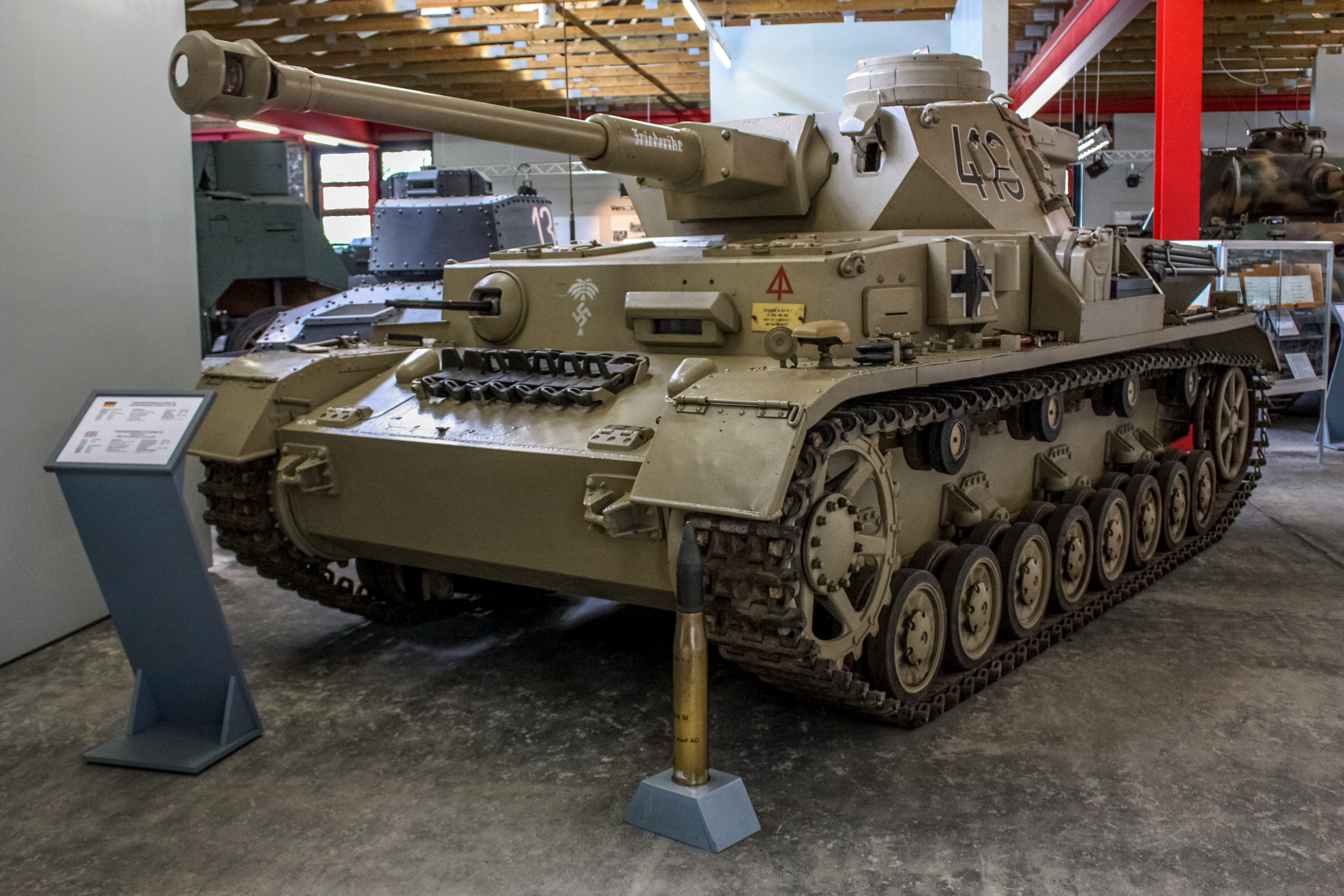
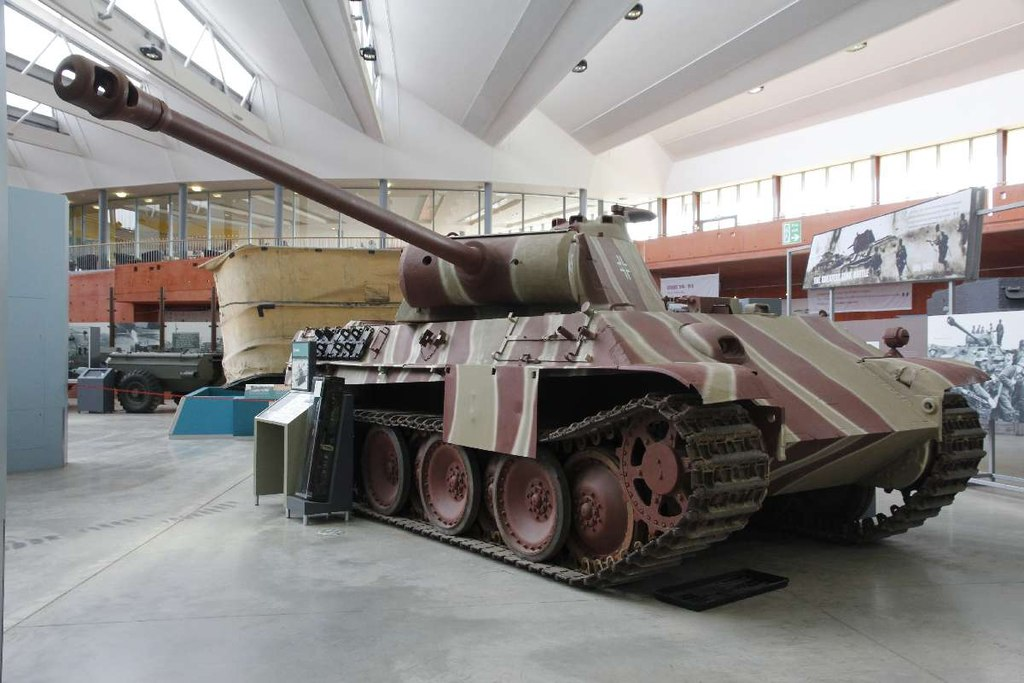
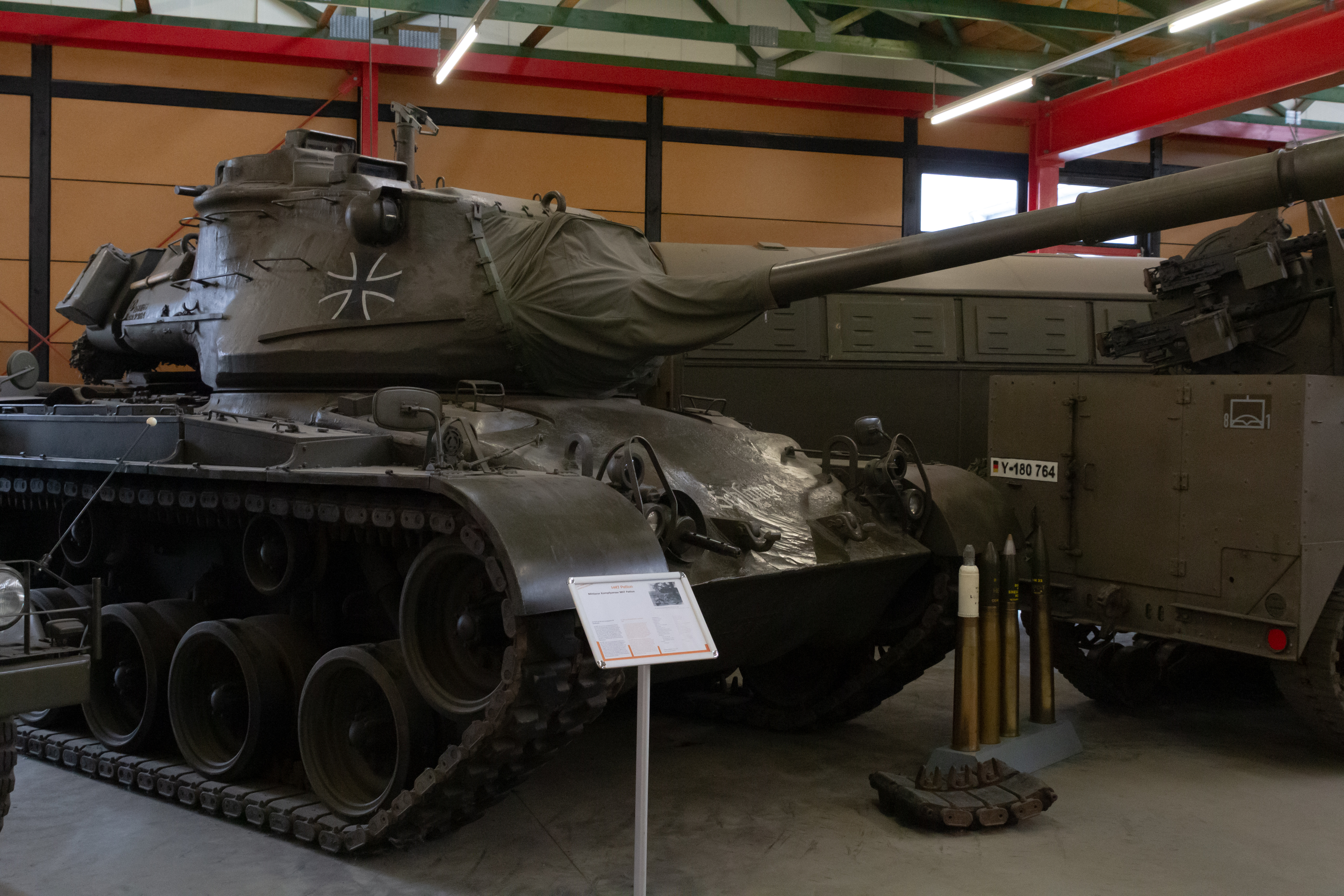
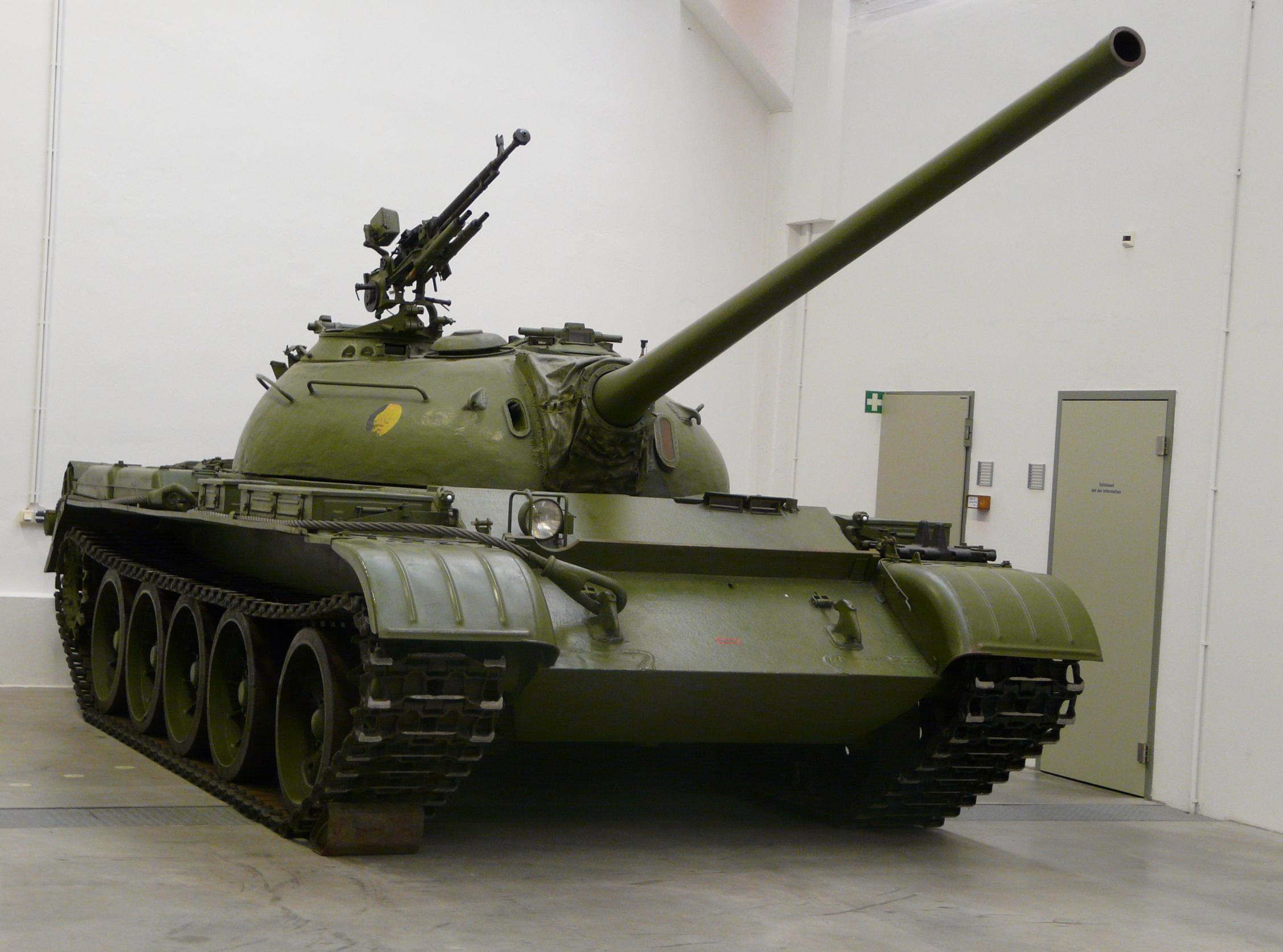
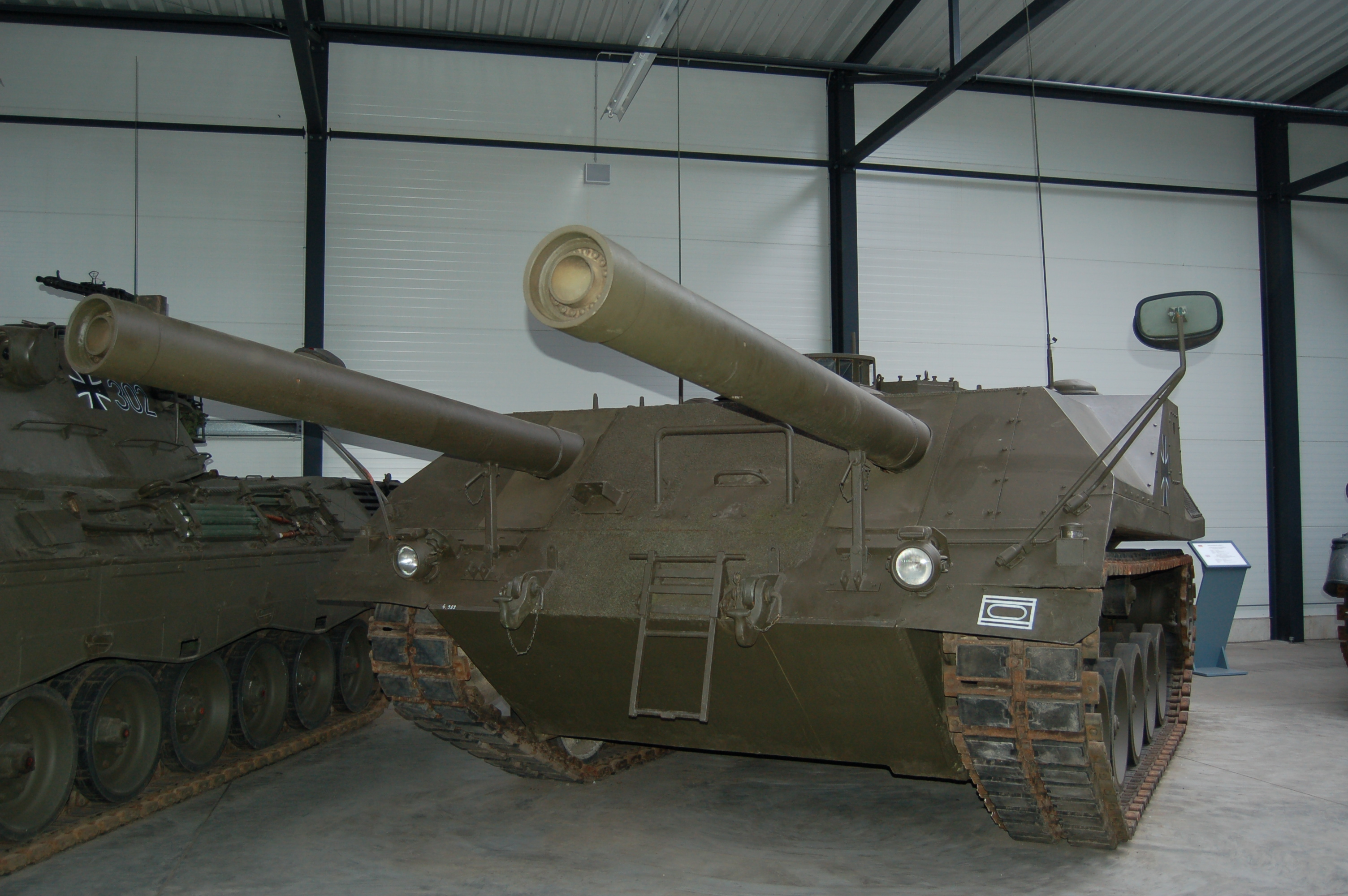
- Panzer III
- Panzer IV
- Panther
- M47 Patton (West Germany)
- T-34 (East Germany)
- T-54/T-55 (East Germany) (Warsaw Pact designation)

=== Experimental ===
- Grosstraktor (Großtraktor)
- Škoda T-25
- Neubaufahrzeug
- Treffas-Wagen
- VK 20
- E-50
- VT

== Heavy tanks ==
=== Out of service ===
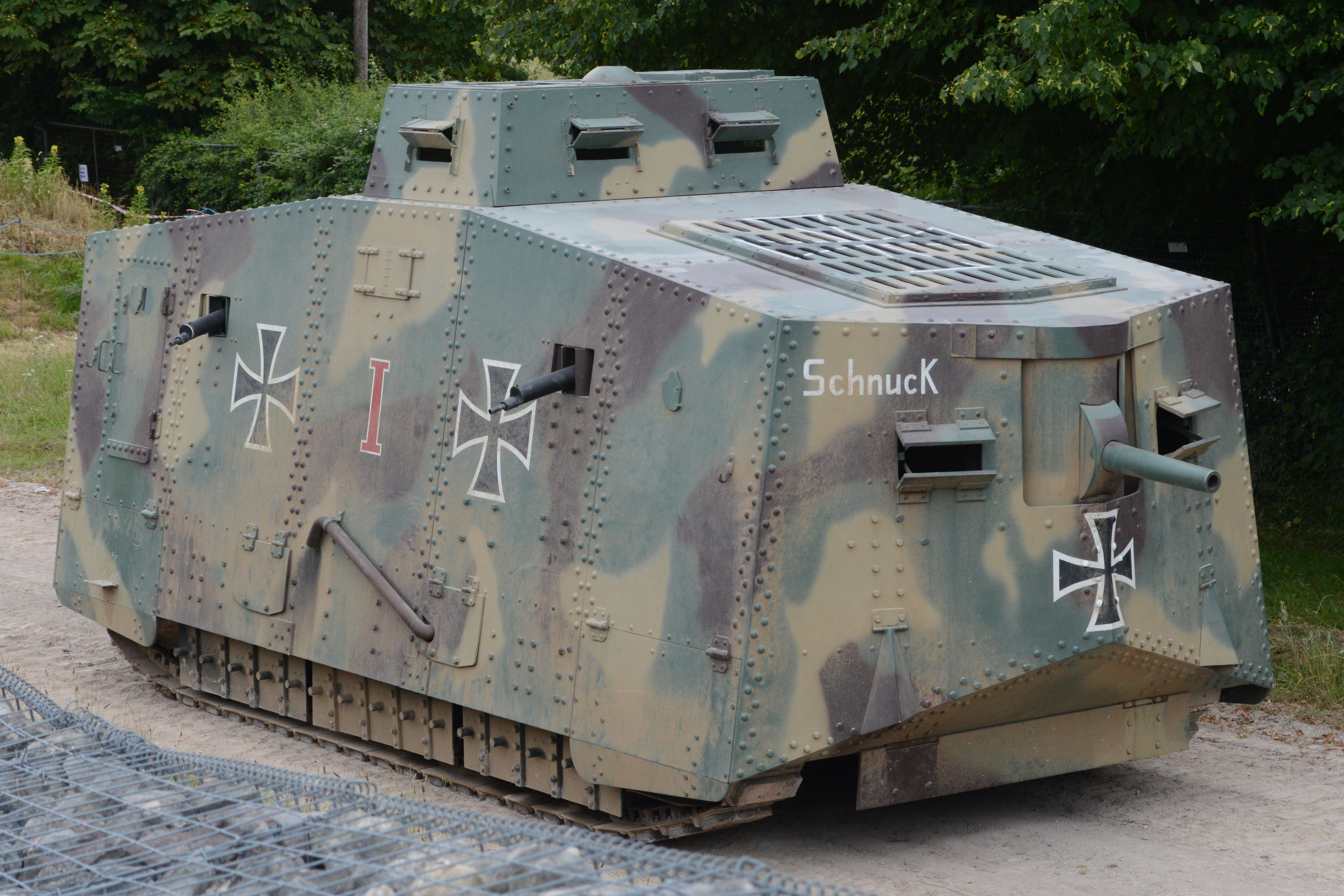
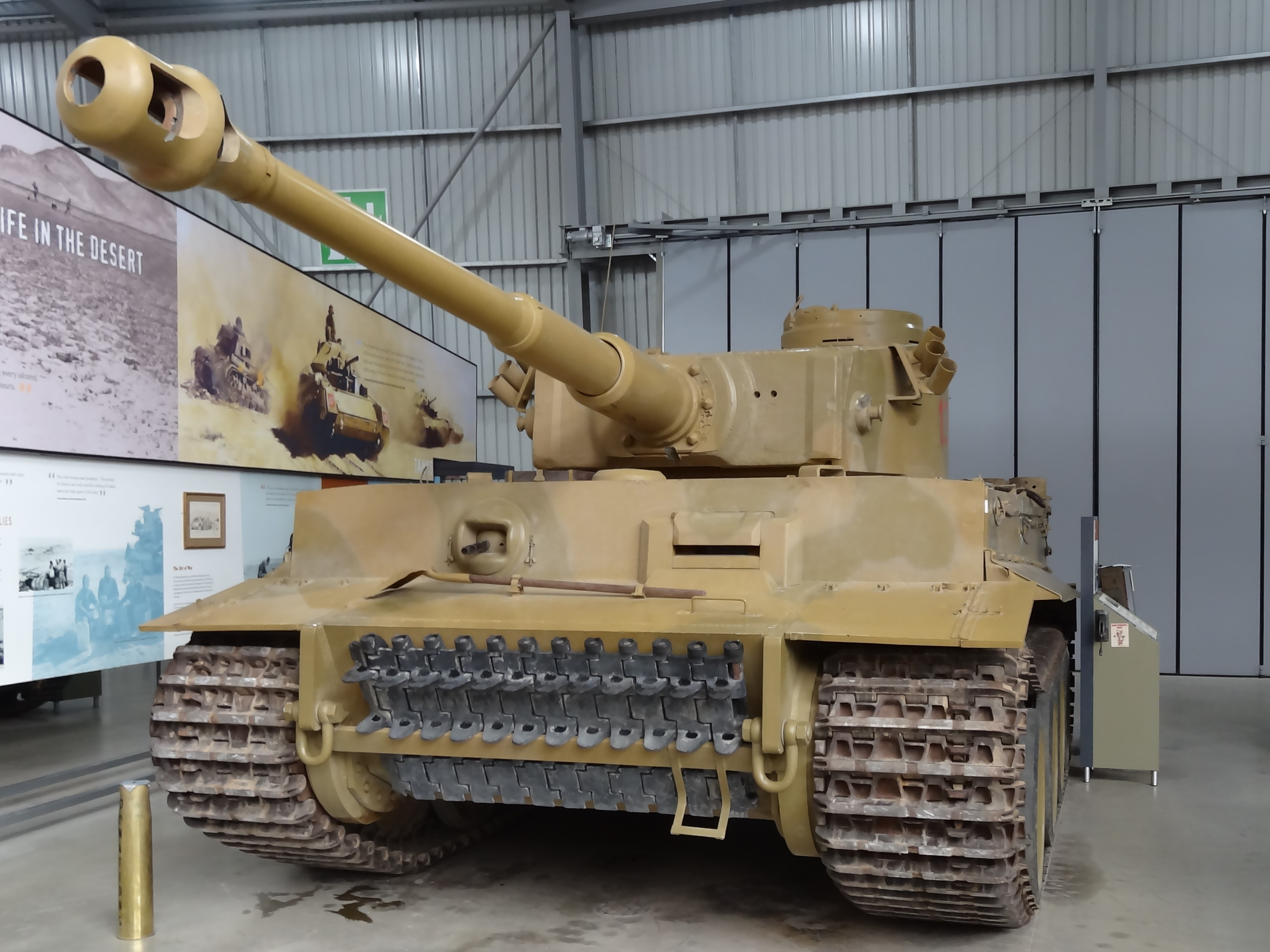
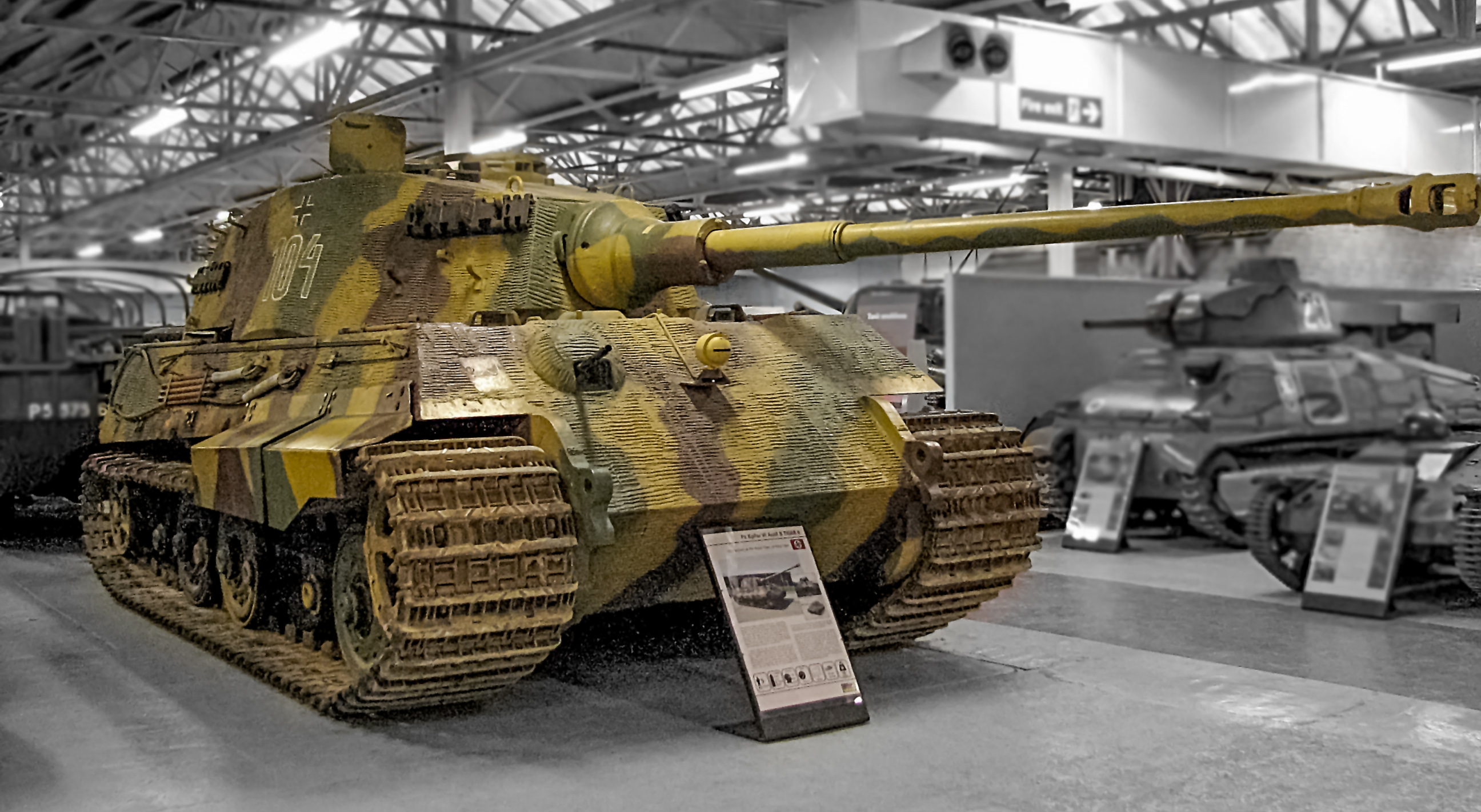
- A7V
- A7V-U
- Tiger I
- Tiger II or King Tiger
- IS-2 (East Germany)

=== Experimental ===
- VK 30.01 (H)
- VK 36.01 (H)
- VK 45.01 (P)
- VK 45.02 (P)
- E-75 Standardpanzer
- Panther II - Proposal based on the Panther and Tiger II.

== Super-heavy tanks ==
=== Experimental ===
- Großkampfwagen/K-Wagen
- Panzer VII Löwe
- Panzer VIII Maus
- E-100
- Landkreuzer P. 1000 Ratte
- Panzer X and Panzer IX - Sole purpose was to deceive Allied intelligence.

== Main battle tanks ==
=== Out of service ===
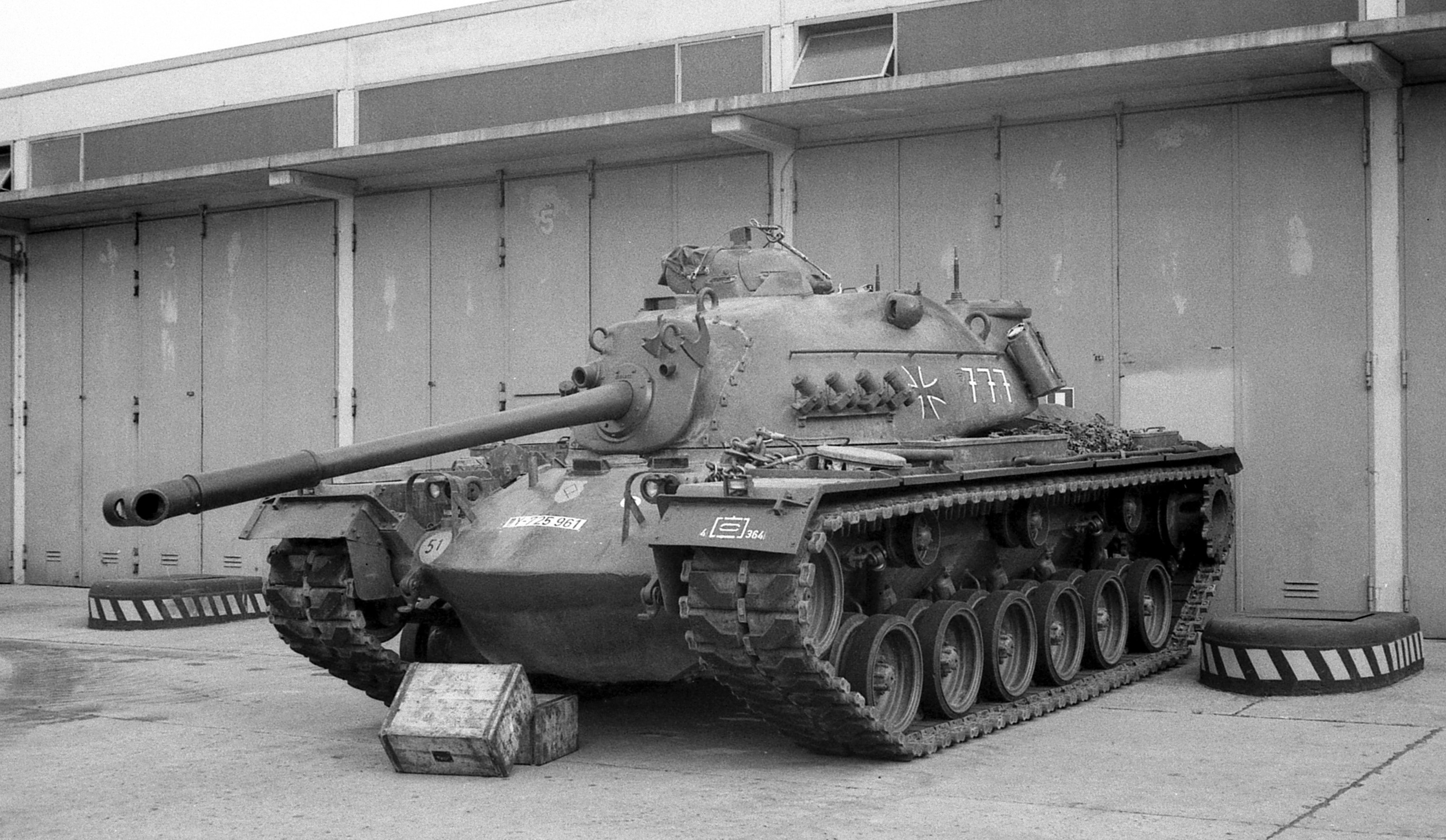
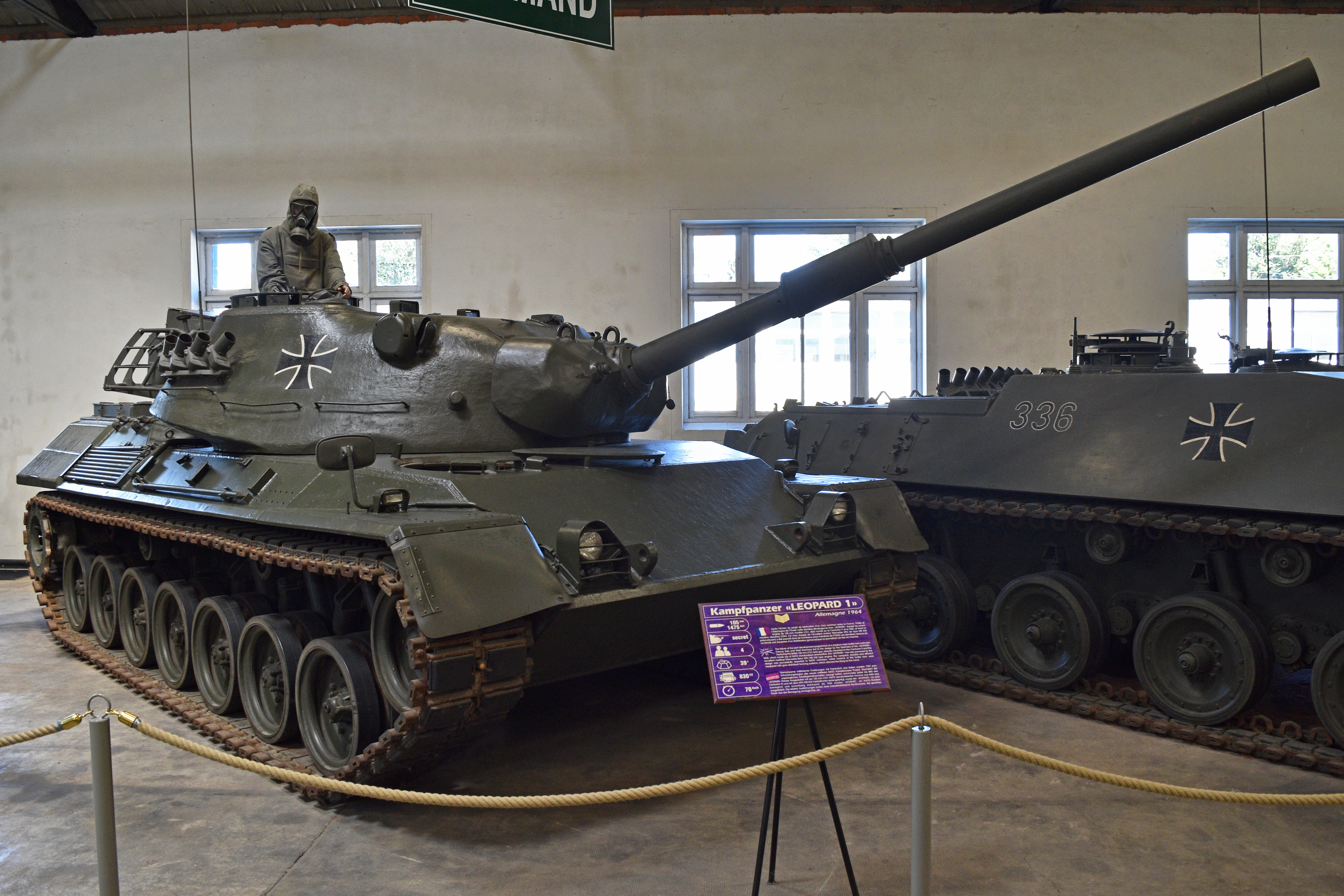
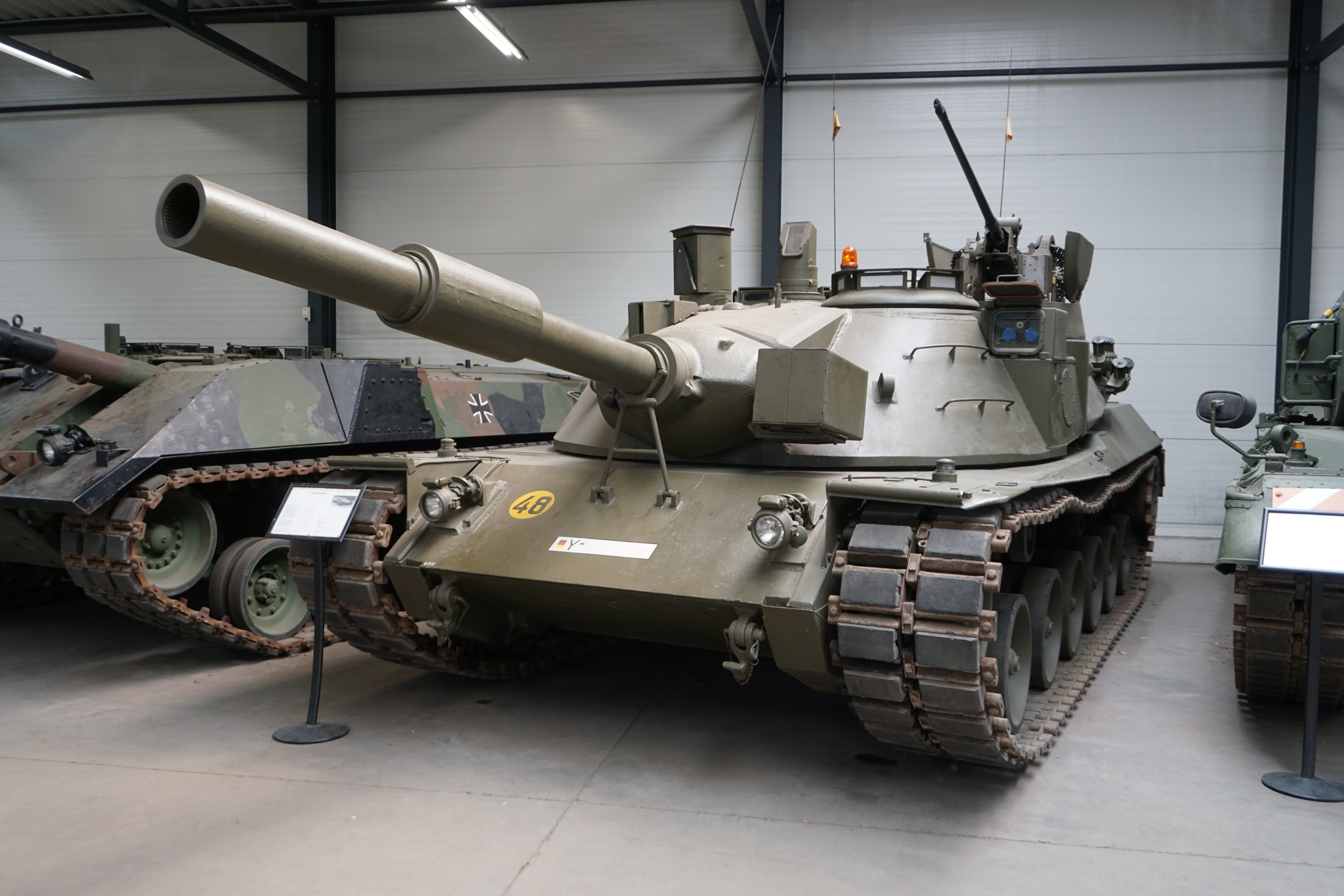
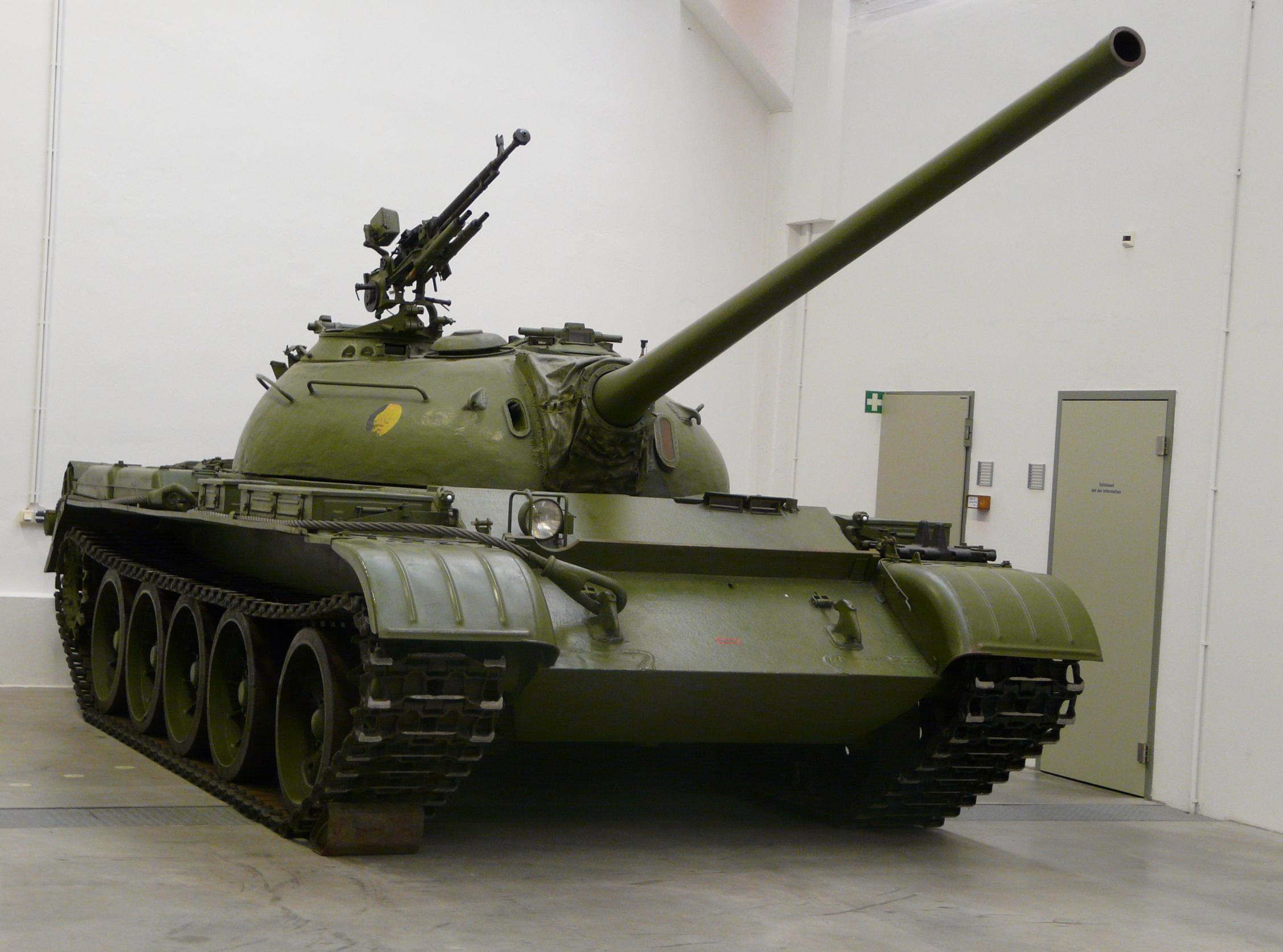
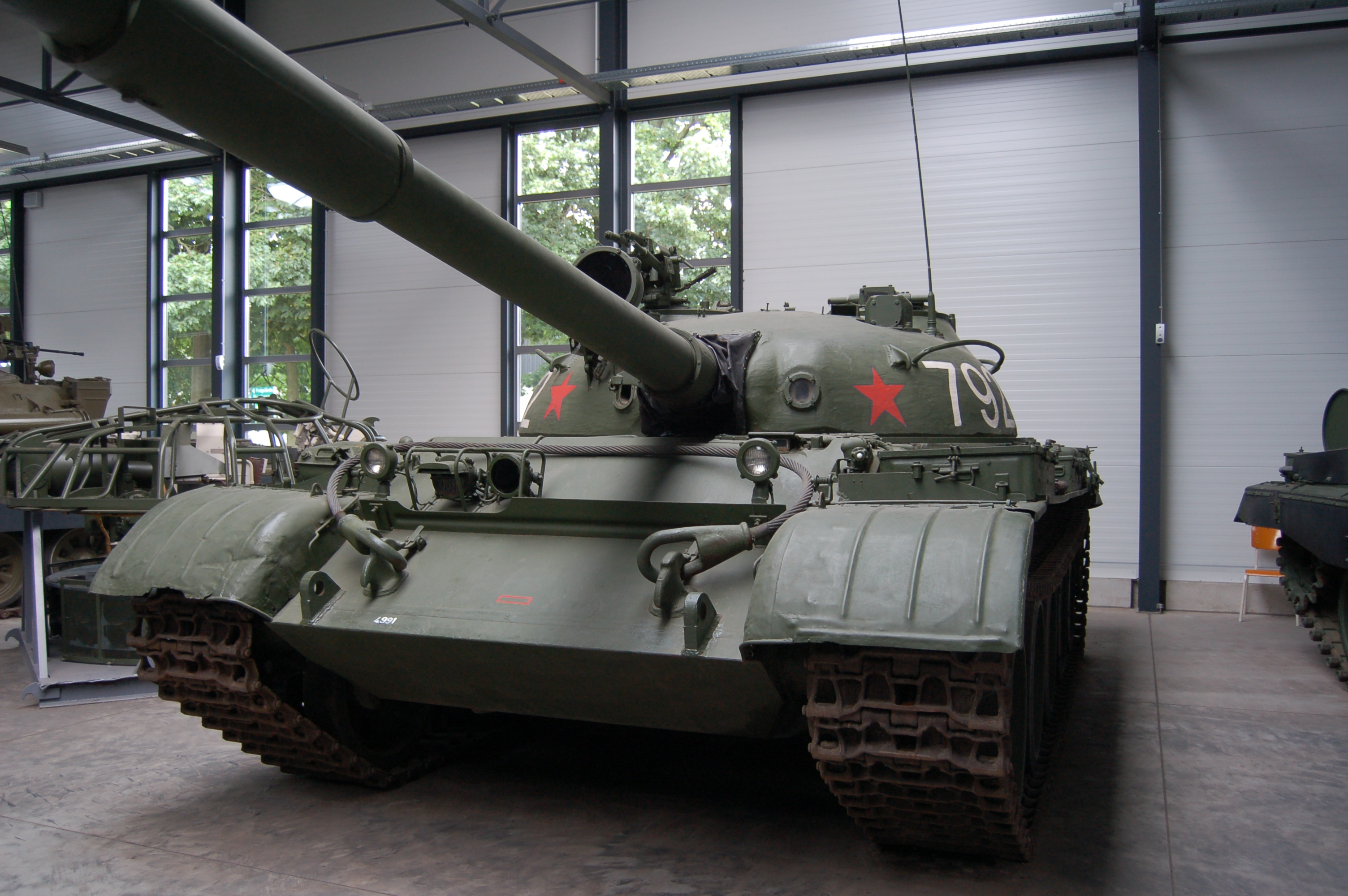
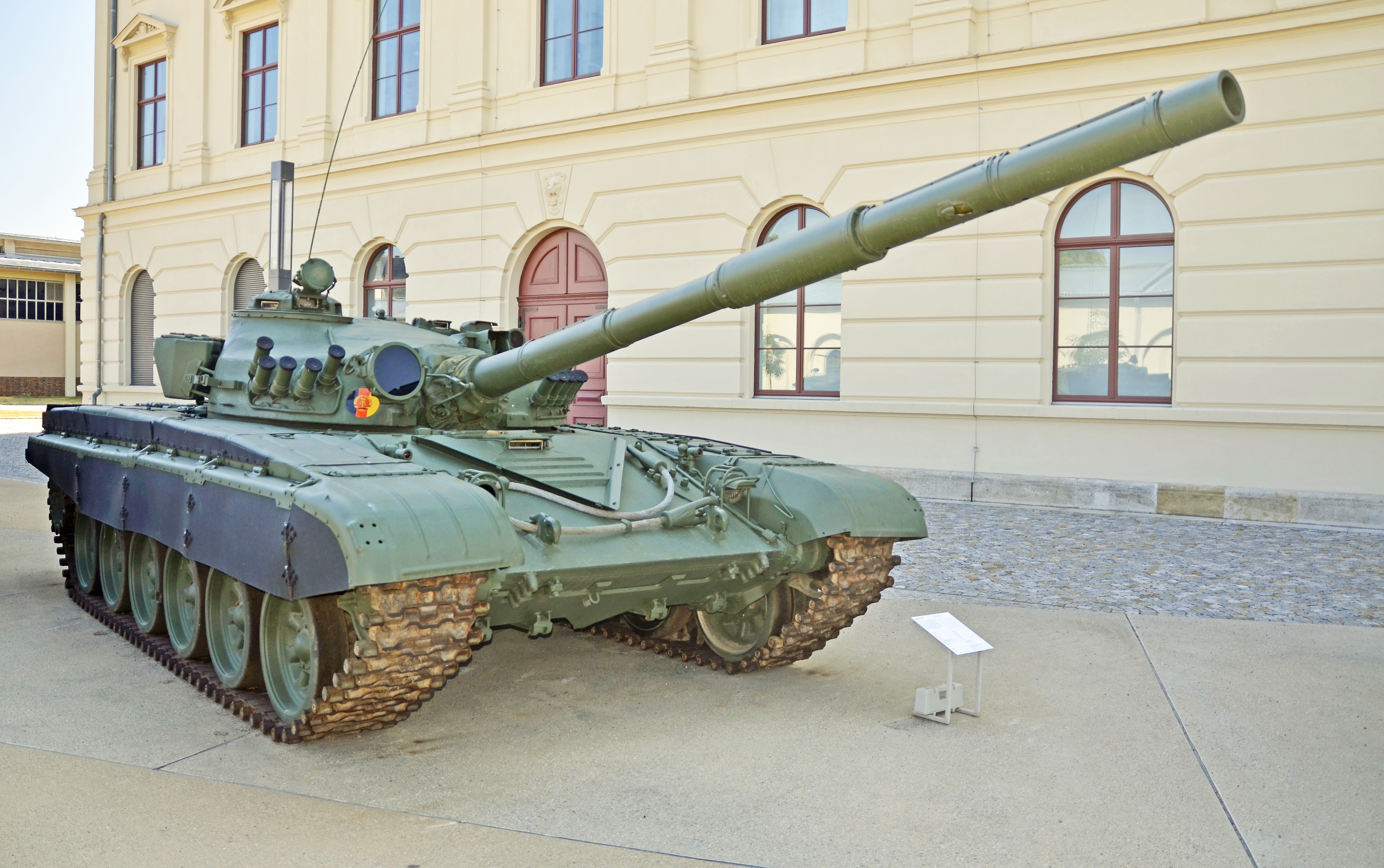
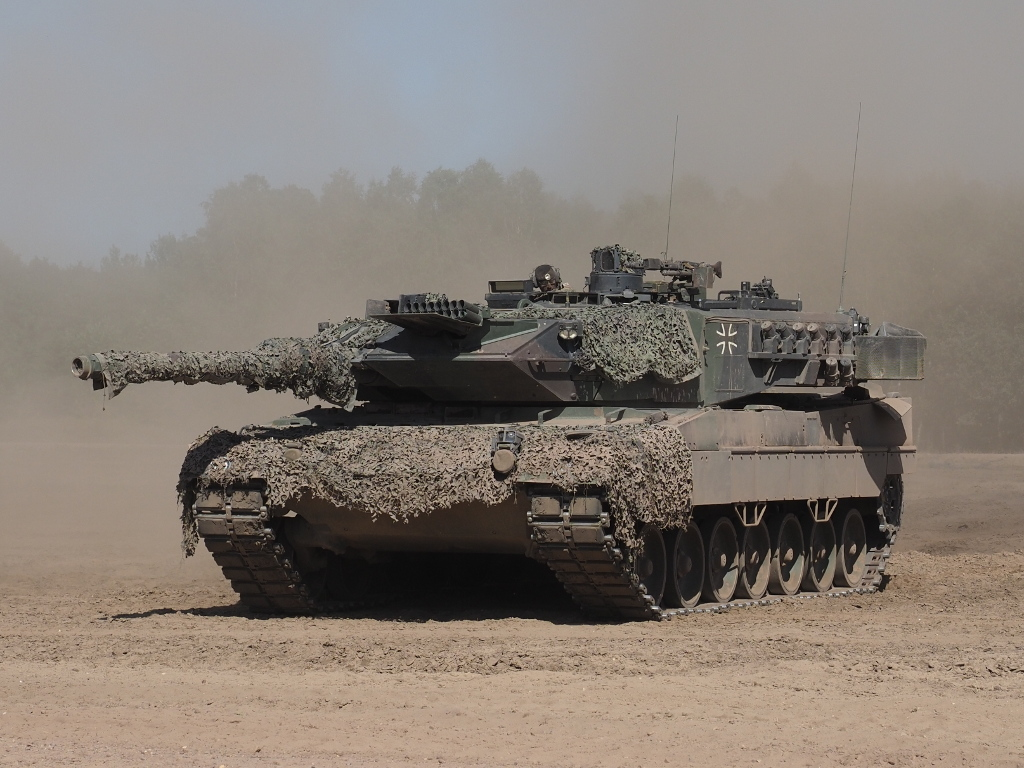
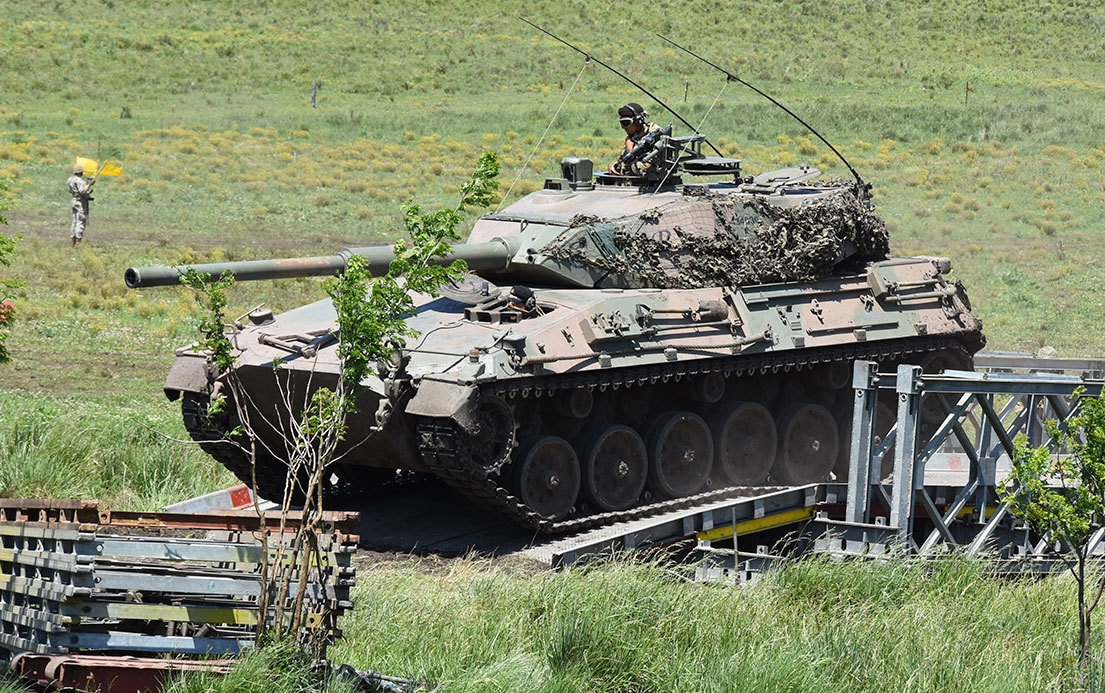
- M47 Patton (West Germany)
- M48 Patton (West Germany)
- T-54/T-55 (East Germany) (NATO designation)
- Leopard 1/Leopard I
- T-62 (East Germany)
- T-72, T-72M (East Germany)

=== Experimental ===
- MBT-70 - West German/American development, later evolved into the M1 Abrams.
- Lince - West German/Spanish development.
- EMBT - French/German development.

=== In service ===
- TAM - Argentina/Germany, used by Argentina
- Leopard 2
- Leopard 2E (export variant for the Spanish Army)
- Leopard 2PL (export variant for the Polish Land Forces)

=== Future ===
- Main Ground Combat System
- Panther KF51

== Tank destroyers/assault guns ==
=== Out of service ===
- Panzerjäger I - First German tank destroyer introduced in WWII.
- Sturmgeschütz III
- Sturmgeschütz IV
- Marder I
- Marder II
- Marder III
- Hetzer/Jagdpanzer 38
- 8.8 cm Flak 18 (Sfl.) auf schwere Zugkraftwagen 12t (Sd.Kfz 8)
- 15 cm sIG 33 (Sf) auf Panzerkampfwagen I Ausf B or Sturmpanzer I Bison.
- 15 cm sIG 33 auf Fahrgestell Panzerkampfwagen II (Sf) or Sturmpanzer II Bison.
- 15 cm sIG 33/2 (Sf.) auf Jagdpanzer 38(t)
- 10.5 cm K gepanzerte Selbstfahrlafette/Panzer Selbstfahrlafette IV Ausf. A (Pz.Sfl. IVa) "Dicker Max"
- Jagdpanzer IV
- Nashorn, Panzerjäger III/IV
- Brummbär/Sturmpanzer (assault gun)
- Sturm-Infanteriegeschütz 33B
- Sturmtiger
- Jagdtiger
- Jagdpanther
- Elefant
- SU-85 (East Germany)
- SU-100 (East Germany)
- Raketenjagdpanzer 1
- Raketenjagdpanzer 2
- Jaguar 1
- Jaguar 2
- Kanonenjagdpanzer (West Germany)

=== Experimental ===
- Pz. Sfl. IVc
- Versuchsträger 1–2 (VT)

== Anti-aircraft and artillery ==
=== Out of service ===
==== Anti-aircraft ====
- Flakpanzer I
- Flakpanzer IV "Ostwind"
- Flakpanzer IV "Kugelblitz"
- Möbelwagen
- Wirbelwind
- 9K33 Osa (East Germany)
- 9K35 Strela-10 (East Germany)

==== Artillery ====
- Grille
- Hummel
- Wespe
- Heuschrecke 10
- Karl-Gerät
- 2S1 Gvozdika (East Germany)
- 2S3 Akatsiya (East Germany)
- M107 self-propelled gun (West Germany)
- M109 howitzer (West Germany)
- M110 howitzer (West Germany)

=== Experimental ===
- Pz. Sfl. IVc
- Sturer Emil
- Geschützwagen Tiger
- Landkreuzer P. 1500 Monster
- Eskorter-35

=== In service ===
- Panzerhaubitze 2000
- Gepard
- MARS II

== Armored personnel carriers, infantry, and fighting vehicles ==
=== Out of service ===
- Marienwagen - APC
- Bergepanther
- Sd.Kfz. 250 - Half-track APC
- Sd.Kfz. 251 - Half-track APC
- BTR-70, armoured personnel carrier (East Germany)
- BMP-2 (East Germany)
- Wisel AWC - Tankette
- Spähpanzer Luchs
- Schützenpanzer Lang HS.30 - Infantry fighting vehicle

=== Experimental ===
- Gepanzerter Mannschaftstransportwagen 'Kätzchen'
- Schützenpanzer SPz 11-2 Kurz - Infantry fighting / armored reconnaissance vehicle
- TH-495
- Begleitpanzer 57 AIFSV - Infantry fighting vehicle

=== In service ===
- M113 armored personnel carrier
- Schützenpanzer Marder 1 (West Germany)
- TPz Fuchs (West Germany)
- Sedena-Henschel HWK-11 (with Mexico)
- Boxer
- LGS Fennek
- Puma (German infantry fighting vehicle)
- Condor
- ATF Dingo
- Thyssen Henschel UR-416 (West Germany)
- TM-170
- PMMC G5
- GFF4

=== Future ===
- Pandur I (6×6); the German Army plans to use this to replace its TPz Fuchs, competing with this role however is the Patria 6×6 and the modernized TPz Fuchs 1A9.
- Patria 6×6; the German Army plans to use this to replace its TPz Fuchs, competing with this role however is the Pandur I (6×6) and the modernized TPz Fuchs 1A9. It also may replace the LGS Fennek.

== Utility vehicles/armored cars ==
=== Out of service ===
- Opel Blitz, truck
- ADGZ
- Trippel SG6
- Borgward B 3000, truck
- Krupp Protze, artillery trailer/utility truck
- Mercedes-Benz L3000, truck
- Radschlepper Ost
- Raupenschlepper Ost
- M42 Truppenfahrrad, bicycle
- Zündapp KS 750, motorcycle
- BMW R12 and R17, motorcycles
- BMW R75, motorcycle
- Sd.Kfz. 2 'Kettenkrad', light half-tracked gun tractor
- Maultier/Sd.Kfz. 3, half-track
- Sd.Kfz. 4 - Half-track/Multiple rocket launcher
- Sd.Kfz. 5 (3-ton 6x6 truck)
- Sd.Kfz. 6 - Half-track
- Sd.Kfz. 7 - Half-tracked artillery tractor
- Sd.Kfz. 8 - Heavy half-track
- Sd.Kfz. 9 - Heavy half-track
- Sd.Kfz. 10 - Light half-track
- Sd.Kfz. 11 - Light half-track
- Kfz 13
- Bergepanther, armoured recovery vehicle
- Leichter Panzerspähwagen, armored car
- Schwerer Panzerspähwagen, armored car
- Sd.Kfz. 234
- Sd.Kfz. 247 - Armored car
- Sd.Kfz. 250 - Half-track APC
- Sd.Kfz. 251 - Half-track APC
- Sd.Kfz. 252 - Half-track
- Sd.Kfz. 253 - Armored Half-track
- Sd.Kfz. 254 - Tracked/wheeled armoured scout car
- Sd.Kfz. 265 Panzerbefehlswagen, command vehicle based on the Panzer I chassis
- Sd.Kfz. 300
- Tatra 111, heavy truck
- Raupenschlepper Ost
- Borgward IV, demolition vehicle
- Goliath tracked mine, demolition vehicle
- Springer, demolition vehicle
- Volkswagen Kommandeurswagen, military derivate of the Volkswagen Beetle for transporting high-ranking officers
- Volkswagen Kübelwagen, light utility vehicle (LUV)
- Volkswagen Schwimmwagen, amphibious LUV
- Landwasserschlepper, tracked amphioxus trailer
- Meillerwagen, V-2 rocket trailer
- PTS (vehicle), PTS-M (East Germany)
- Sonder Kfz-1

=== Experimental ===
- VW 276 Schlepperfahrzeug, artillery trailer

=== In service ===
- Keiler - Built on the hull of an M48 Patton.
- MAN 630 L2
- Bergepanzer 2 - armored recovery vehicle
- Condor
- Thyssen Henschel UR-416 (West Germany)
- TM-170
- LAPV Enok
- LGS Fennek
- Mungo ESK
- RMMV HX
- M3 Amphibious Rig - amphibious bridging vehicle
- AEV 3 Kodiak - armoured engineering variant of a Leopard 2.

== See also ==
- Tanks in the German Army
- German tanks in World War II
- German armored fighting vehicle production during World War II
- List of German combat vehicles of World War II
- List of modern equipment of the German Army
