= VK 30.01 (H) =

German heavy tank prototype

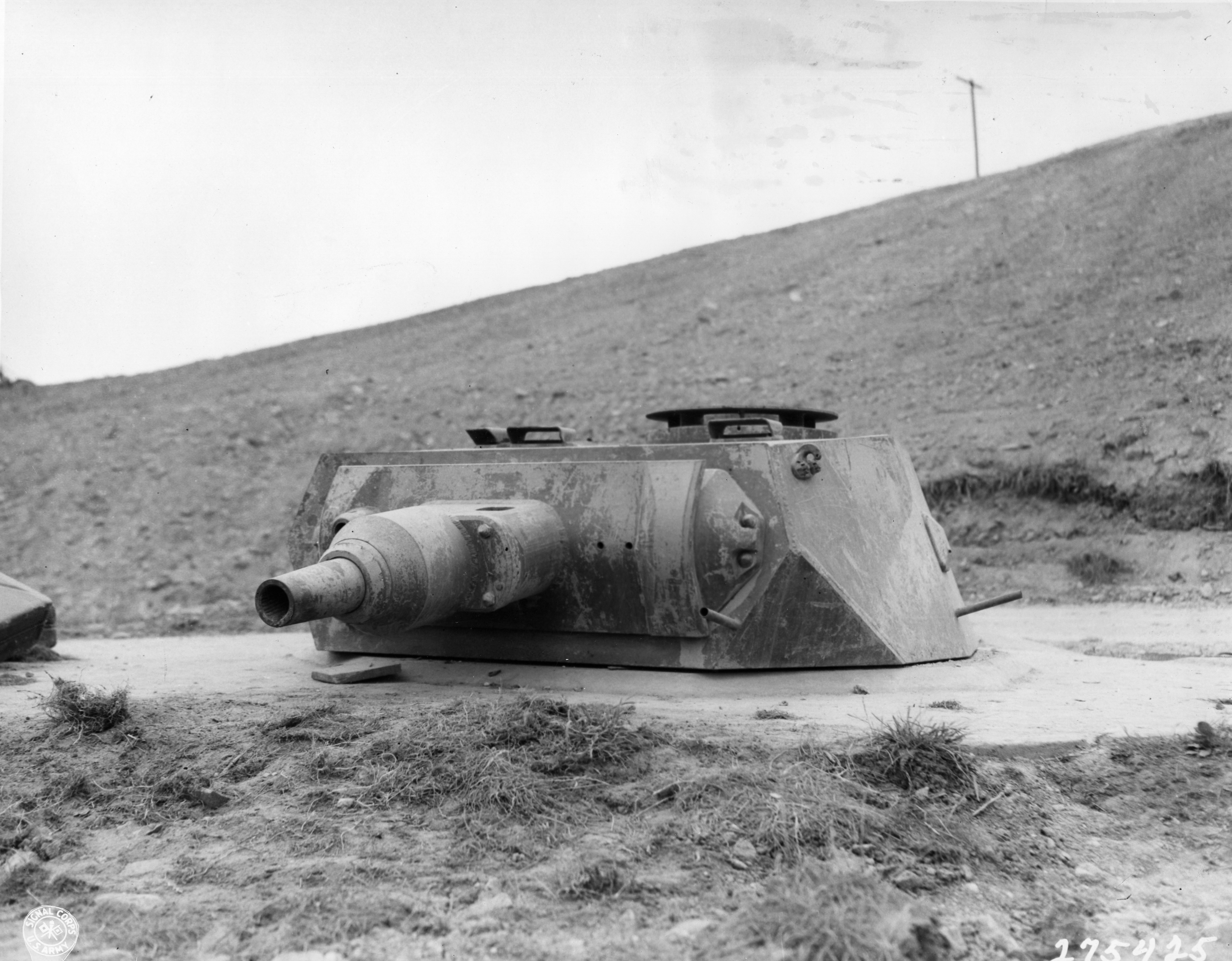
- VK 30.01 (H) turret in Omaha Beach
- Type: Heavy tank
- Place of origin: Germany

Service history
- Used by: Germany
- Wars: World War II

Production history
- Designer: Henschel
- Designed: 1937-1941
- Manufacturer: Henschel
- Produced: 1940-1942
- No. built: 4

Specifications
- Mass: 32 t (31 long tons; 35 short tons)
- Length: 5.775 m (18 ft 11 in)
- Width: 3.155 m (10 ft 4 in)
- Height: 2.575 m (8 ft 5 in)
- Crew: 5
- Armor: 60 mm (2.4 in) max
- Main armament: 7.5 cm KwK 37
- Secondary armament: 2 x 7.92mm MG 34 machine gun
- Engine: Maybach HL 116 in-line 6-cylinder water-cooled petrol 300 hp (220 kW)
- Power/weight: 9.4 hp/tonne
- Suspension: individual torsion bar
- Ground clearance: 450 mm (18 in)
- Fuel capacity: 408 L (90 imp gal; 108 US gal)
- Operational range: 150 km (93 mi)
- Maximum speed: 35 km/h (22 mph)

The VK 30.01 (H) is a German prototype heavy tank developed by Henschel in Germany during World War II. It was rejected for production likely due to being outdated by the time it was meant to be produced. The chassis from this project went on to form the chassis for the Sturer Emil self-propelled anti-tank gun project.

== Development ==
In 1937 the German Army Ordnance Office (Heereswaffenamt) had ordered the design of 30-tonne tanks from Henschel, MAN SE, and Daimler-Benz that would succeed the Panzer IV medium tank for infantry support, and was to be produced by Krupp. To that end it would carry either the same short-barrelled 7.5 cm KwK 37 gun of the Panzer IV or a tank-mounted version of the 10.5cm leFH18/40 L/28 howitzer. In October 1941, Krupp was asked if the 7.5 cm KwK 40 could be mounted, but the answer was negative, not without many modifications. Alternatively, the long barreled 5 cm KwK 39 or L/50 was able to be mounted instead of the short 7.5cm cannon or the 10.5cm cannon. The overall scheme of the design was similar to the Panzer IV but larger and it used overlapping wheels.

The first VK 30.01 delivered to Henschel was delivered as a hull without a turret. A further three chassis were completed by 1942 but none received turrets.

In 1941, the German Army requirements for armour increased and Henschel redesigned to give the VK 36.01 (H). Two of the hulls left from the VK 30 project were reused to construct the 12.8 cm Selbstfahrlafette auf VK 30.01(H) "Sturer Emil" Panzerjäger vehicles.

In 1942, the development of the type was cancelled in favour of the development of the heavier and more advanced VK 45.01 (H) project, which in turn became the Tiger I prototype. The remaining turretless hulls remained in Henschel's factory in Haustenbeck and were used as recovery, training and test vehicles. Six of the proposed VK 30.01 (H) turrets were used in permanent fortifications of the Atlantic and West Wall.
