= VK 45.01 (H) =

German heavy tank prototype

VK 45.01 (H) was a German tank which was the final prototype of the Panzer VI Tiger I, evolved from the VK 36.01 (H), designed by Henschel. It was selected by Adolf Hitler over the competing VK 45.01 (P) from Porsche for production into the Tiger I. It came in two variants, the VK 45.01 (H) H2 with a 75 mm L/70 gun, and the VK 45.01 (H) H1 with an 88 mm L/56 gun.
