= Sd.Kfz. 247 =

Sd.Kfz. 247 schwerer geländegängiger gepanzerter Personenkraftwagen
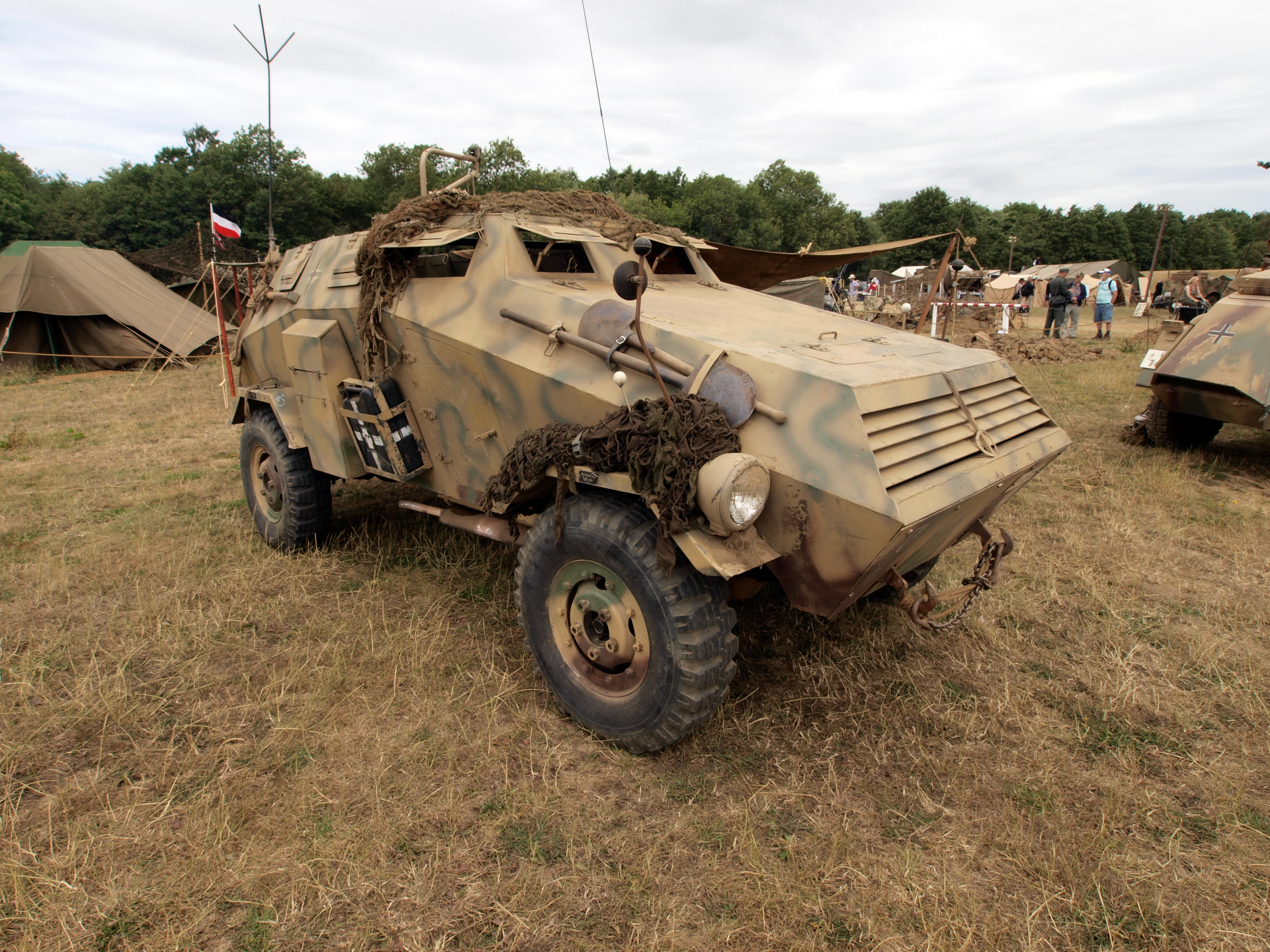
- Sd.Kfz 247 Ausf. B
- Type: Armored car
- Place of origin: Nazi Germany

Service history
- In service: 1937–1945
- Used by: Nazi Germany
- Wars: World War II

Production history
- Designer: Krupp (Ausf. A); Daimler-Benz (Ausf. B)
- Manufacturer: Krupp (Ausf. A); Daimler-Benz (Ausf. B)
- Produced: 1937 (Ausf. A); 1941–1943 (Ausf. B)
- No. built: 10 (Ausf. A); 58 (Ausf. B)
- Variants: Ausf. A (6 wheel); Ausf. B (4 wheel)

Specifications (Sd.Kfz. 247 Ausf. B)
- Mass: 4.46 t (4.39 long tons; 4.92 short tons)
- Length: 5 m (16 ft 5 in)
- Width: 2 m (6 ft 7 in)
- Height: 1.8 m (5 ft 11 in)
- Crew: 6
- Armor: 6–8 mm (0.24–0.31 in)
- Engine: Horch 8-cylinder, water-cooled 3.8 petrol 81 PS (80 hp)
- Power/weight: 18.1 hp/t
- Transmission: 5 x 1
- Suspension: Coil spring
- Ground clearance: 23 cm (9.1 in)
- Fuel capacity: 160 L (42 US gal)
- Operational range: 400 km (250 mi) road 270 km (170 mi) cross-country
- Maximum speed: 80 km/h (50 mph)

Sd.Kfz. 247 (Sonderkraftfahrzeug 247) was an armored car used by the German armed forces during World War II.

Before the war, ten six-wheeled models (Ausf. A) were built; this was followed during the war by 58 four-wheeled models (Ausf. B).

== Description ==
The Sd.Kfz. 247 had an open-topped, thinly armored body mounted on a wheeled chassis. It was unarmed as its six-man crew was not intended to fight; rather, it was intended for use by the commanders of motorcycle and motorized reconnaissance battalions, although neither version was fitted with any radios. Its armor was intended to stop 7.92-millimetre (0.312 in) armor-piercing bullets at ranges over 30 metres (33 yd). Photographic evidence shows some Ausf. B vehicles were retro-fitted with a star-shaped radio antenna mounted inside the crew compartment, and an additional armor plate bolted to the lower glacis of the hull.

=== Ausf. A ===
Krupp built ten Ausf. A models on the chassis of its six-wheel "Krupp Protze" truck in 1937. Its 3.5-litre (210 cu in) 4-cylinder air-cooled gasoline flat engine (Krupp M 305) of 65 hp (66 PS), gave it a top speed of 70 km/h (43 mph) and a range of 350 km (220 mi).

Like all of the other vehicles that used this chassis, the Ausf. A had very limited cross-country mobility, drivers being advised to stay on roads and trails. It weighed 5.2 t (5.1 long tons; 5.7 short tons), was 5.2 m (17 ft 1 in) long, 1.96 m (6 ft 5 in) wide and 1.7 m (5 ft 7 in) tall.

=== Ausf. B ===
Daimler-Benz built 58 of these in 1941—1942 on a four-wheel drive heavy car chassis (s.Pkw. Typ 1c). The front-mounted engine was an 8-cylinder, 3.823-litre (233.3 cu in) Horch 3.5 petrol engine, giving it a road speed of 80 km/h (50 mph). It had a maximum range of 400 km (250 mi).

== Armour ==
Thickness/slope from the vertical
	Front	Side	Rear	Top/Bottom
Superstructure	8 mm (0.31 in)/38°	8 mm (0.31 in)/35°	8 mm (0.31 in)/30°	open
Hull	8 mm (0.31 in)/35°	8 mm (0.31 in)/35°	8 mm (0.31 in)/36°	6 mm (0.24 in)

== Sources ==
- Chamberlain, Peter; Doyle, Hilary L.; Jentz, Thomas L. (1993) [1978]. Encyclopedia of German Tanks of World War Two: A Complete Illustrated Directory of German Battle Tanks, Armoured Cars, Self-propelled Guns, and Semi-tracked Vehicles, 1933–1945 (Revised ed.). London: Arms and Armour Press. ISBN 1-85409-214-6.
- Jentz, Thomas L.; Doyle, Hilary (2001). Panzerspaehwagen: Armored Cars Sd.Kfz.3 to Sd.Kfz.263. Panzer Tracts 13. Boyds, Maryland: Panzer Tracts. ISBN 0-9708407-4-8.
