= VK 36.01 (H) =

German experimental heavy tank

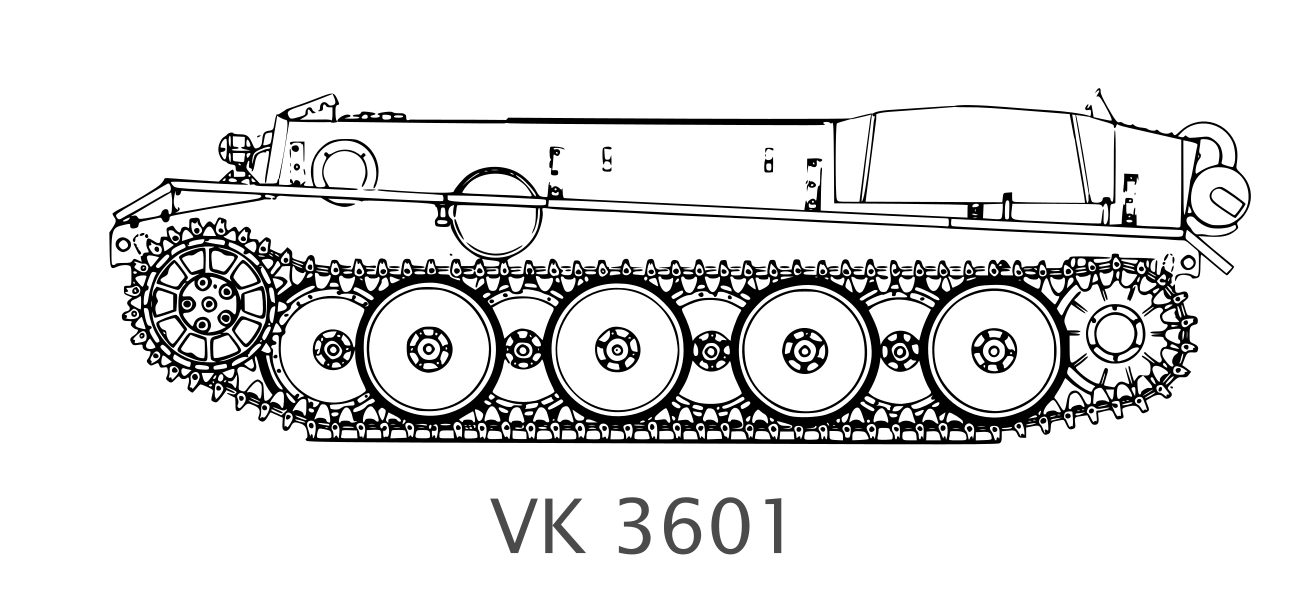
- Hull of VK 36.01 (H)
- Type: Heavy tank
- Place of origin: Germany

Service history
- Used by: Germany

Production history
- Designer: Henschel
- Manufacturer: Henschel

Specifications
- Mass: 40 t (39 long tons; 44 short tons)
- Crew: 5
- Armor: 145 mm (5.7 in) max
- Power/weight: 9.4 hp/tonne
- Suspension: individual torsion bar
- Maximum speed: 50 km/h (31 mph)

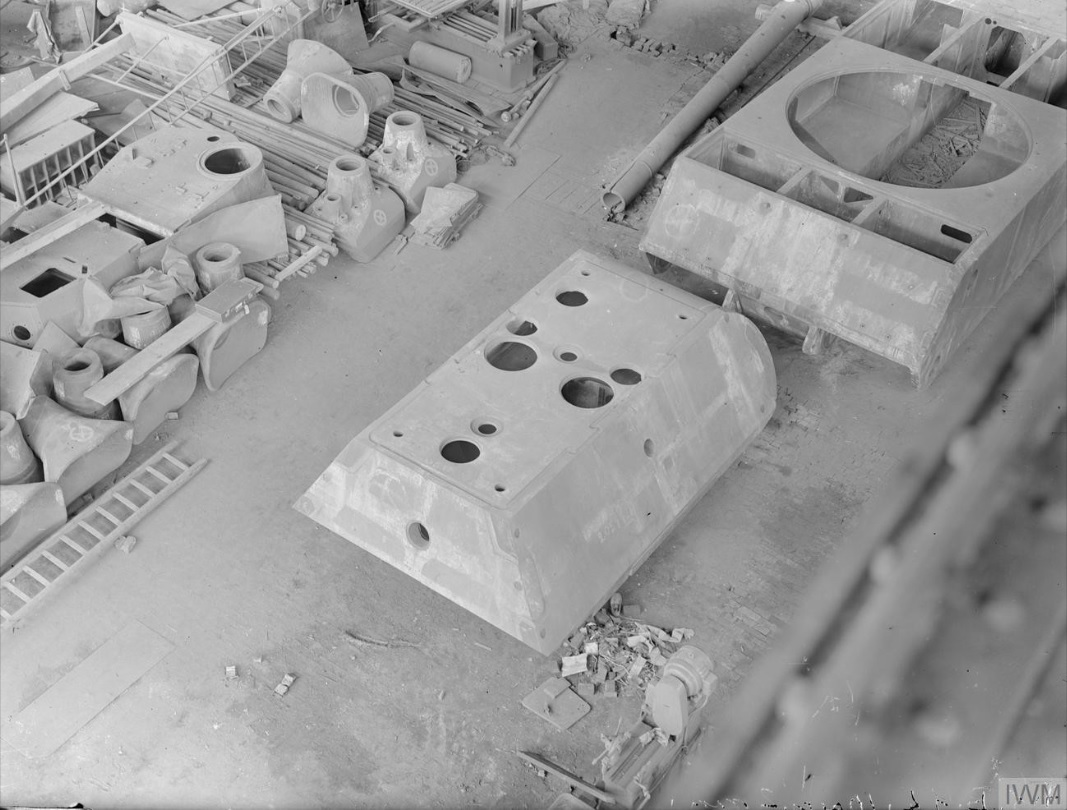
Parts of an unfinished armored vehicle taken at the Krupp steel works in Essen in May 1945 after the war. The VK 36.01's turret is lined up, along with the hull and turret of the Panzer VIII Maus super-heavy tank and the Jagdtiger gun mantlet.

The VK 36.01 (H) was an experimental German heavy tank, developed during World War II. The VK 36.01 H was further development of the VK 30.01 (H) experimental heavy tank, and subsequently led to the development of the VK 45.01 (H).

There were only 8 chassis and one complete prototype built, all by Henschel. At the time Henschel was assigned with developing a breakthrough weapon that would help defeat the Soviet Union. Other experimental heavy tanks and super-heavy tanks were built, designed, and tested by Henschel. The development of the VK 36.01 (H) led to the development of the VK 45.01 (H), the prototype immediately preceding, and approved for production into, the Tiger I.
