= Pz. Sfl. IVc =

- Type: Tank destroyer / self-propelled anti-aircraft gun
- Place of origin: Nazi Germany

Service history
- Used by: Nazi Germany
- Wars: World War II

Production history
- Designed: 1941
- Produced: 1942
- No. built: 3

Specifications
- Mass: 26 t (26 long tons; 29 short tons)
- Crew: 6 (driver, commander, 2 gunners, 2 loaders)
- Armor: 14–20 mm (0.55–0.79 in)
- Main armament: 8.8 cm Flak 41 L/74 (1943); 8.8 cm Flak 37 L/56 (1944)
- Engine: Maybach HL120 TRM 12-cylinder gasoline engine 400 hp
- Power/weight: 15.56
- Maximum speed: 60 km/h

The Panzer Selbstfahrlafette IV Ausf. C, or Pz. Sfl. IVc. also known as Grille 10, the 8.8cm Flak 37 auf Sonderfahrgestell ("8.8cm anti-aircraft gun 37 on special chassis"), was a German mobile gun platform for the widespread 8.8 cm anti-aircraft/anti-tank gun, built in 1941. It was a lightly armoured vehicle. Only 3 prototypes were produced.

== Development ==
A heavy Panzerjäger (tank destroyer) was ordered to be built by the Waffenamt in 1941. The vehicle was originally intended to be a self propelled assault gun, and was developed as such, but part way through development it was realised that with the anti aircraft usefulness of the 8.8 cm Flak 41 gun, it could also be used in the role of an anti-aircraft vehicle. In late 1942, there were 3 prototypes made. In 1944, the gun was replaced with the 8.8 cm Flak 37. The Pz. Sfl. IVc was manufactured by Krupp.

== Specifications ==
The vehicle had a crew of 8 and weighed 26 tons. It was 2.8 metres (9 ft 2 in) high, 3 metres (9.8 ft) wide and 7 metres (23 ft) long. It was powered by the Maybach HL90 engine. The turret was open, with armoured superstructure panels folding down on each side to make a platform level with the hull top and allow full 360° traverse; when raised the panels provided some protection for the vehicle's crew, who were also protected from the front by a shield for the gun. The vehicle was built on a Panzer IV chassis, with extensive modifications. While a number of different guns were considered, the vehicle was originally armed with the 8.8 cm FlaK 41 L/74, it eventually ended up being armed with the 8.8 cm Flak 37.

== Service ==
One example was deployed to the Western front. It served with Heeres Flakartillerie Abteilung 304 ("Army anti-aircraft artillery detachment 304") in Italy, which was assigned to the 26th Panzer Division.
