= Sturer Emil =

German Anti-fortification gun

12.8 cm Selbstfahrlafette auf VK 30.01(H) "Sturer Emil"
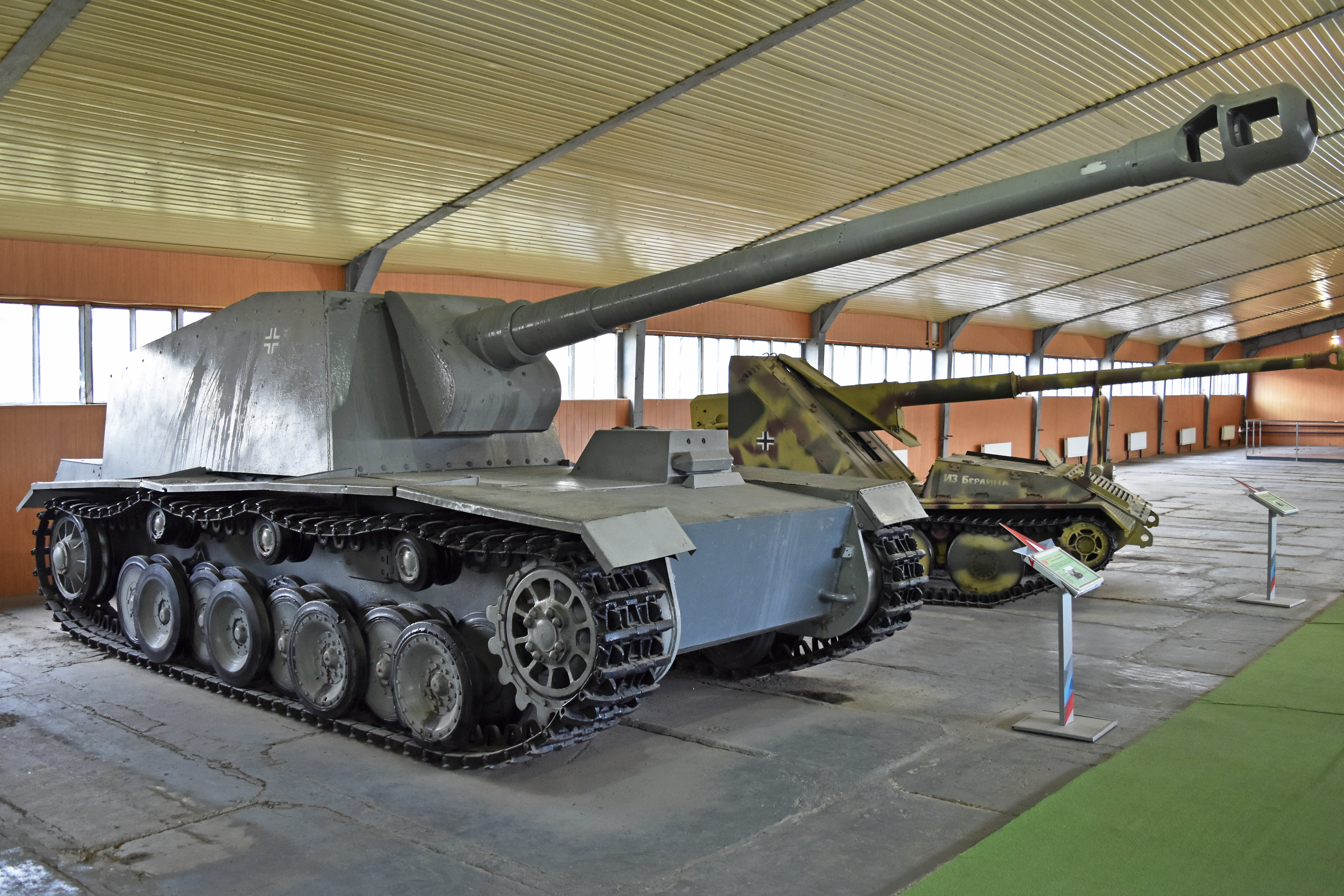
- The only surviving 'Sturer Emil' in Kubinka Tank Museum
- Type: Anti-fortification gun
- Place of origin: Nazi Germany

Service history
- In service: 1942–1943
- Used by: Nazi Germany
- Wars: World War II

Production history
- Designed: 1941
- Produced: 1942
- No. built: 2

Specifications
- Mass: 35 t (34 long tons; 39 short tons)
- Length: 9.7 m (31 ft 10 in)
- Width: 3.16 m (10 ft 4 in)
- Height: 2.7 m (8 ft 10 in)
- Crew: 5
- Armor: 15–50 mm (0.59–1.97 in)
- Main armament: Rheinmetall-borsig 12.8 cm Flak 40
- Secondary armament: MG 34
- Engine: Maybach HL116, liquid-cooled I-6; 300 PS (220 kW)
- Power/weight: 8.57 hp/tonne
- Fuel capacity: 450 L (120 US gal)
- Maximum speed: 25 km/h (16 mph)

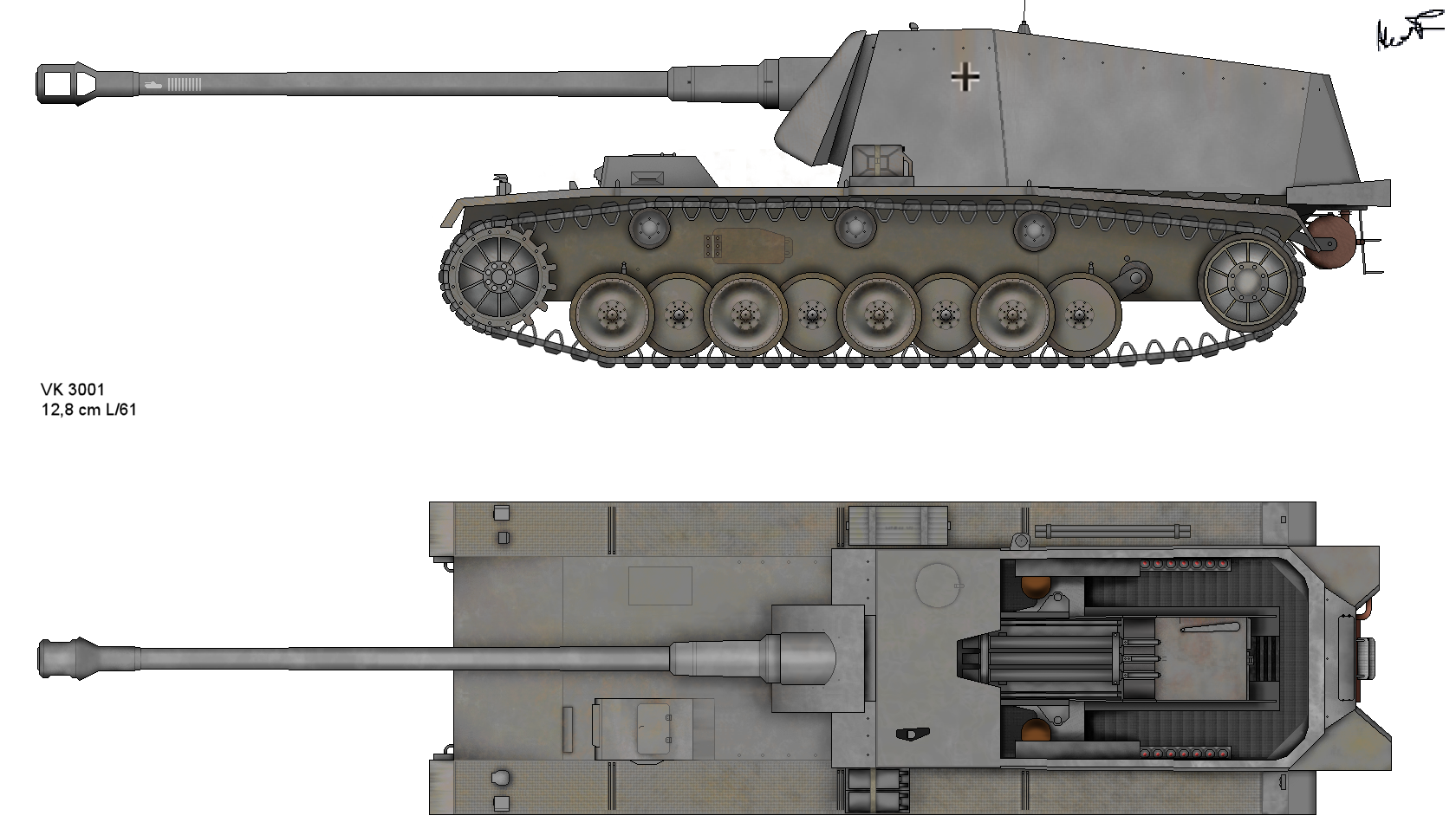
An artist's drawing of the Sturer Emil

The 12.8 cm Selbstfahrlafette auf VK 30.01(H) "Sturer Emil" (German for "Stubborn Emil"), also called Panzer Selbstfahrlafette V (Pz.Sfl. V), was an experimental World War II German self-propelled anti-fortification gun. It was based on the Henschel VK 30.01 (H) chassis and armed with a Rheinmetall 12.8 cm Kanone 40 L/61 gun (based on the 12.8 cm FlaK 40). This gun could traverse 7° to each side, elevate 10° and depress -15°. It carried 15 rounds for the main gun.

The hulls were left over from Henschel's submission for the canceled VK 30.01 heavy tank program - development of a 30-tonne tank which led to the Tiger - but the hull was stretched and an extra road wheel added to its overlapped and interleaved Schachtellaufwerk roadwheel-based suspension system, to accommodate the large gun, which was mounted on a pedestal ahead of the engine. A large, open-topped fighting compartment, much like that fitted to the Panzer IV-based Hummel self-propelled 15 cm howitzer, was built where the turret was intended to go in the original design.

Two vehicles were built (and named after Max and Moritz, the storybook characters); both of which served on the Eastern Front. Max was either destroyed or abandoned due to persistent mechanical issues in 1942, while Moritz was captured at Stalingrad in January 1943, with at least 22 kill marks painted on the barrel. This captured vehicle is now displayed in the collection of the Kubinka Tank Museum.

== See also ==
- Nashorn
- Dicker Max
- Jagdpanther
- Jagdtiger

=== Tanks of comparable role, performance and era ===
- Italian Semovente da 105/25
- Japanese Ho-Ri
- Soviet SU-100Y
- Soviet ISU-122

== Sources ==
- Chamberlain, Peter, and Hilary L. Doyle. Thomas L. Jentz (Technical Editor). Encyclopedia of German Tanks of World War Two: A Complete Illustrated Directory of German Battle Tanks, Armoured Cars, Self-propelled Guns, and Semi-tracked Vehicles, 1933–1945. London: Arms and Armour Press, 1978 (revised edition 1993). ISBN 1-85409-214-6
