= 8.8 cm Flak 18 (Sfl.) auf schwere Zugkraftwagen 12t (Sd.Kfz 8) =

8.8 cm Flak 18 (Sfl.) auf Zugkraftwagen 12t (Sd.Kfz. 8)
- Type: Self-propelled gun
- Place of origin: Nazi Germany

Service history
- In service: 1938–1943
- Used by: Nazi Germany
- Wars: World War II

Production history
- Designed: 1938
- Manufacturer: Krupp
- Produced: 1938
- No. built: 10

Specifications (DB 9)
- Mass: 20 tonnes (20 long tons; 22 short tons)
- Length: 7.35 m (24 ft 1 in)
- Width: 2.5 m (8 ft 2 in)
- Height: 2.8 metres (9.2 ft)
- Crew: 2+ gun crew
- Armor: (14.5 mm (0.57 in)) on cab and engine
- Main armament: 8.8cm Flak 18
- Engine: Maybach HL 85 TUKRM 8.5L 12-cylinder water-cooled petrol 185 horsepower (188 PS)
- Payload capacity: 2,550 kg (5,620 lb)
- Transmission: 4 + 1 speed ZF
- Suspension: torsion bar
- Ground clearance: 40 cm (16 in)
- Fuel capacity: 250 litres (66 US gal)
- Operational range: 250 km (160 mi) road 125 km (78 mi) cross-country
- Maximum speed: 51 km/h (32 mph) road 21 km/h (13 mph) cross-country

The 8.8 cm Flak 18 (Sfl.) auf Zugkraftwagen 12t (Sd.Kfz. 8), also known as the Bunkerflak or Bufla, was a German Wehrmacht half-track self-propelled gun developed before World War II and used in the first half of the war. It was used during the Invasion of Poland but is best known for its use during the Battle of France, where it was the only German self-propelled gun capable of destroying the heavier Allied tanks such as the French Char B1 and the British Matilda II. Remaining vehicles were used on the Eastern Front. The last Bufla was destroyed in 1943.

== Description ==
The 8.8 cm Flak 18 (Sfl.) auf Zugkraftwagen 12t (Sd.Kfz. 8) consisted of a 8.8cm Flak 18 gun mounted on a pedestal in the rear of a Sd.Kfz. 8 half-track heavy artillery tractor ("DB s8" or "DB 9" model). A gun shield was provided for the 88, but the gun crew had no other protection. The driver's cab was replaced by a lower, armored cupola and the engine compartment was lightly (14.5 mm (0.57 in)) armored.

The upper body had a crew compartment with three bench seats, one for the driver and his assistant, and two others for the gun crew. The gun was mounted behind the crew compartment. It could fire directly ahead without any problem, but traverse was limited to 151° to each side by the gun shield. Elevation was between -3° and +15°. The windshield could fold forward and was also removable.

== Design and development ==
In the mid-1930s, most modern armies had standardized on anti-tank guns ranging from 37 mm to 45 mm. While adequate to knock out the tanks of the period, their relatively small, high-velocity rounds were ineffective against fortifications, even when high explosive ammunition was available for them. When planning for a war with Czechoslovakia, the German army needed a vehicle that could reduce armored gun turrets and concrete bunkers. Experience with the Flak 18 during the Spanish Civil War showed that it was effective against land targets such as bunkers and vehicles as well as against aircraft. For this reason, the Army Weapons Office asked for a more mobile version of Rheinmetall's 8.8 cm anti-aircraft gun.

Daimler-Benz combined the best of both designs in the DB s7 prototype which appeared in 1934. It used the same engine as the ZD.5, but otherwise bore little resemblance to the older model other than an upper body that had two bench seats for the crew behind the driver's seat. This upper body remained the same over the life of the Sd.Kfz. 8. It weighed 14.4 tonnes (14.2 long tons; 15.9 short tons) and could pull loads of 12 tonnes (12 long tons; 13 short tons). An improved version was introduced in 1936 as the DB s8. The heavier (15 tonnes (15 long tons; 17 short tons)) DB 9 model appeared in 1938. It used the Maybach HL 85 TUKRM engine, could carry an 800 kilograms (1,800 lb) payload and could tow a 14 tonnes (14 long tons; 15 short tons) load. Daimler-Benz tried unsuccessfully to use their diesel OM 48/1 engine, but it was repeatedly rejected by the Army Weapons Office.

=== Service history ===
All ten vehicles were assigned to the first company of the anti-tank battalion Panzerjäger-Abteilung 8 which participated in the Invasion of Poland in 1939, the Battle of France in 1940 and Operation Barbarossa in 1941. The company was redesignated as Panzerjäger-Kompanie ("Anti-Tank Company") 601 in January 1942 and then as the third company of Anti-Tank Battalion 559 the following April. It reported that the last three vehicles had been lost by March 1943.

== Bibliography ==
- Chamberlain, Peter, and Hilary L. Doyle. Thomas L. Jentz (Technical Editor). Encyclopedia of German Tanks of World War Two: A Complete Illustrated Directory of German Battle Tanks, Armoured Cars, Self-propelled Guns, and Semi-tracked Vehicles, 1933–1945. London: Arms and Armour Press, 1978 (revised edition 1993). ISBN 1-85409-214-6
- Spielberger, Walter J. Halftracked Vehicles of the German Army 1909–1945. Atlgen, PA: Schiffer, 2008 ISBN 978-0-7643-2942-5
