= VK 20 =

German medium tank project

VK 20 series
- VK 20 (M)
- Type: Medium tank
- Place of origin: Germany

Production history
- Designer: Daimler Benz, Krupp, MAN
- Designed: 1938 to 1941

Specifications
- Mass: 20 to 24 tonnes
- Length: 5.130 to 5.580 m
- Width: 2.950 to 3.020 m
- Height: 2.500 to 2.695 m
- Crew: 5 (Commander, loader, gunner, driver, radio operator)
- Armor: 40–50 mm (1.6–2.0 in)
- Main armament: 5 cm KwK 38 L/42; 5 cm KwK 39 L/60; 7.5 cm KwK 44 L/43
- Engine: MB 809, HL90, HL116; 300-450 hp
- Power/weight: 14 to 20 hp/tonne
- Suspension: Leaf springs or Torsion bars
- Maximum speed: 50 to 56 km/h

The VK 20 series were the proposed replacements of the Panzer IV and Panzer III tanks with entries by MAN, Krupp and Daimler Benz. It was initially projected to weigh 20 tonnes, but grew to 24 tonnes. By November 1941, the designs almost reached completion but against the professional judgement of Wa Pruef 6, political interference in December 1941 led to all of the designs being dropped. The root of this adverse decision came from encounters with increasing numbers of T-34 and KV-1 tanks. Reichsminister Fritz Todt declared that a new tank, 30 tons in weight should be designed and produced. Oberst Fichtner argued that time would be lost developing this new 30 ton tank, the number produced would be reduced and engineer bridges could not support such a tank. This new tank chosen from the VK 30 series would become the Panther, replacing the VK 20 series. This decision would place the rushed MAN Panther into production as Germany's new standard medium tank, which was plagued with issues never fully addressed especially those caused by MAN's final drive. It would also arrive too late, with Germany's position in a steep decline, having lost the initiative.

== Daimler Benz ==
=== VK 20.01(III) ===
Daimler Benz was awarded a contract to develop a 20-ton replacement for the Panzer III. Unlike the Z.W. 40, the VK 20.01(III) was a complete departure from previous designs. It was one of the first tanks designed to use an overlapping/interleaved road wheel suspension system (known as the Schachtellaufwerk), which had been in use with German military half-tracks like the Sd.Kfz. 11 as early as 1934; and had an advantage of having a shorter ground contact length for improved steering with the tank's weight distributed over larger-diameter road wheels, which lasted longer and provided a smoother ride over rough terrain. By 14 December 1938, Daimler Benz completed a design project using the HL 116, which developed 300 metric hp.

=== VK 20.01(D) ===
Daimler Benz having been forced to accept untested components in their Panzer III Ausf E, gained permission to pursue their design without interference from Wa Pruef 6. This allowed them to adopt leaf springs as torsion bars held the following key disadvantages: wasted space inside vehicle, poor access to repair and replace torsion bars, instability as a weapons platform due to the individual sprung wheels and the lack of a satisfactory shock absorber design addressing the instability. The Panzer III Ausf E's hydraulic steering, which did not function as planned, was also dispensed with. It was to be replaced with a system using mechanical levers as long as no better alternative was available. The tank design was to be completed by December 1940 and if the MB 809 diesel engine could be delivered by February 1941, a complete experimental chassis was to follow. The MB 809 had a continuous power rating of 350 metric hp, increasing to up to 400 metric hp without fuel injection. With fuel injection, its power could be increased to 450 metric hp. Design of a diesel motor was deemed necessary to utilize strategic fuel specifically demanded by Hitler. The design of the MB 809 was completed in June 1940 with the first motor running on the test stand in February 1941 followed by its acceptance test on 12 March 1941. The motor arrived in Berlin-Marienfelde to be installed in an experimental chassis. On 22 December 1941, a report to the directors of Daimler-Benz stated: "Based on experience in the Russian campaign, the new tank just developed by Daimler-Benz was now obsolete. Utilizing the already developed tank, studies were being conducted on a new design with thicker armour and heavier armament."

== Krupp ==
=== VK 20.01(IV) ===
A further development of the Panzer IV series also by Krupp. It used leaf spring suspension, the HL 116 engine and the motor compartment of the VK 20.01(III). Maximum speed was to be 42 km/h, same as it was on the Panzer IV Ausf. C. This was later redesignated as the VK 20.01(BW) and then as the B.W.40.

== MAN ==
=== VK 20.02 (M) ===
This was the immediate predecessor to what would become the Panther. According to M.A.N. based on the requirements given by Wa Pruef 6, it was one of the designs they reworked with sloping walls following the "Russian design". No other details about this design have been found.

== Design specifications ==
Comparison of VK 20.01 designs
	VK 20.01(D)	VK 20.01(K)	VK 20.01(M)
Frontal armour	50 mm	50 mm	50 mm
Side armour	40 mm	50 mm	40 mm
Top speed	50 km/h	56 km/h	55 km/h
Length	5.130 m	5.200 m	5.580 m
Width	3.020 m	2.950 m	3.000 m
Height	1.640 m (without turret)	2.500 m	2.695 m
Ground clearance	0.425 m	0.400 m	0.540 m
Track contact length	2.757 m	2.650 m	2.910 m
Track width	440 mm	450 mm	475 mm
Combat weight	22.25 t	21.5 t	Unknown
Engine	MB 809	HL 116	HL 90
Fuel	Diesel	Gasoline	Gasoline
Power	350-450 hp	300 hp	
Suspension	Leaf spring	Leaf spring	Torsion bar

== Proposed armament ==
- 5 cm KwK 38 L/42
- 5 cm KwK 39 L/60
- 7.5 cm KwK 44 L/43 (later redesignated as KwK 40)
