= Krupp Protze =

Krupp L 2 H 43 / L 2 H 143 / Kfz.70
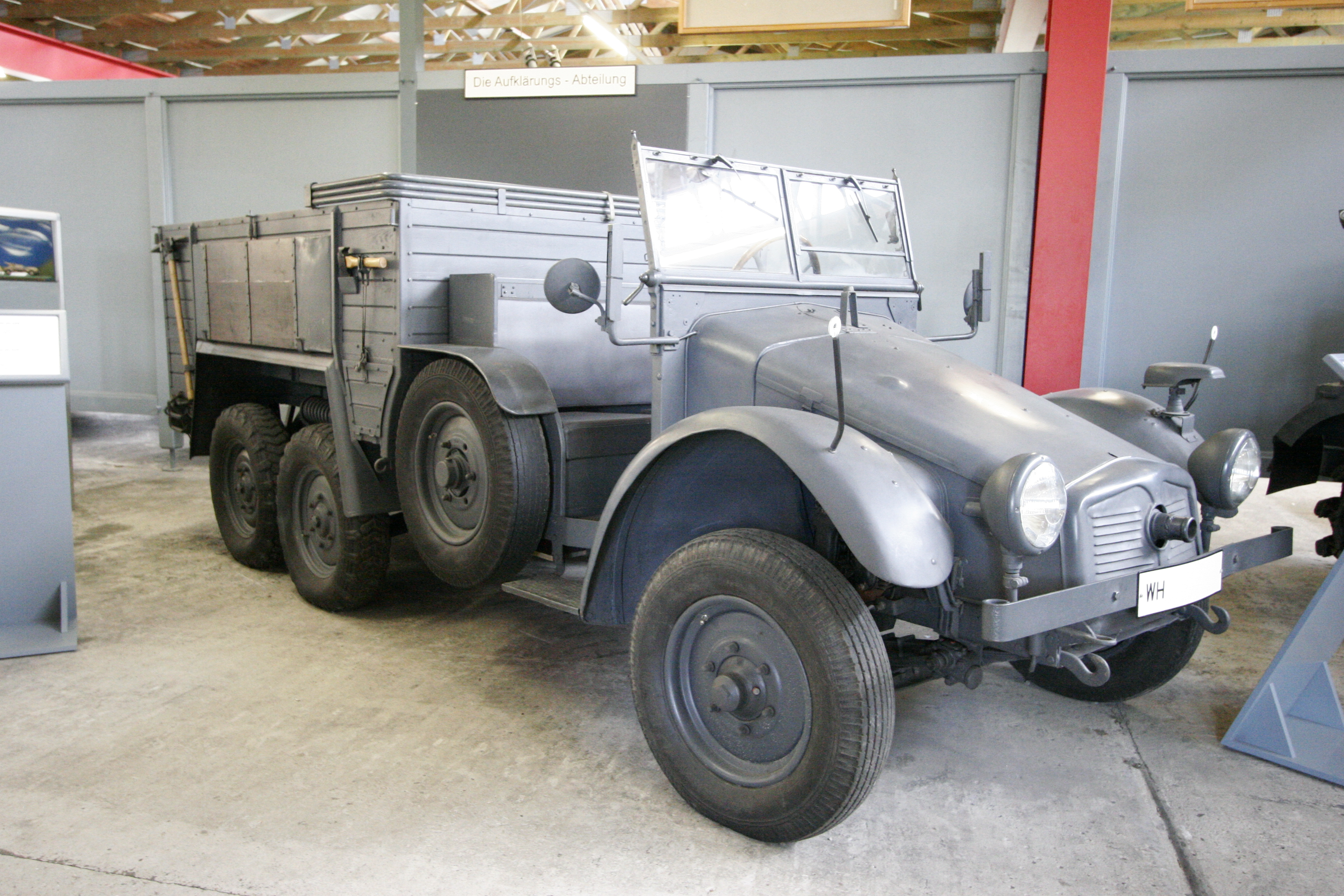
- Krupp Kfz.70 on display at Deutsches Panzermuseum, Germany.
- Type: Artillery tractor / Utility truck
- Place of origin: Germany

Service history
- Used by: Germany; Hungary; Latvia; Poland
- Wars: World War II

Production history
- Designer: Krupp
- Manufacturer: Krupp
- Produced: 1934–1941
- No. built: 7,000
- Variants: Several, see text

Specifications
- Mass: 2,600 kg (5,700 lb)
- Length: 5.10 m (16 ft 9 in)
- Width: 1.93 m (6 ft 4 in)
- Height: 1.96 m (6 ft 5 in)
- Crew: 1 + 5 passengers + 1 light towed gun (Kfz.69), 2+10 (Kfz.70)
- Armor: None
- Engine: Krupp M 305 3.3L F4; 53 or 60 hp
- Payload capacity: 1,150 kg (2,540 lb)
- Fuel capacity: 110 L (24 imp gal; 29 US gal)
- Operational range: 450 km (280 mi) on road
- Maximum speed: 70 km/h (43 mph)

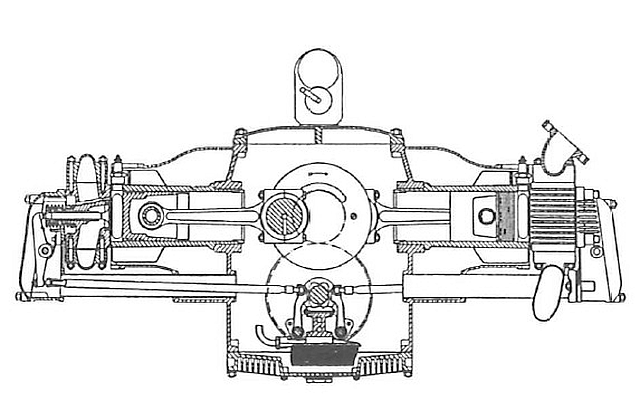
Krupp M305 motor schematic diagram

The Krupp Protze (lit. limber, officially L 2 H 43 and L 2 H 143) was a six-wheeled 6×4 German truck and artillery tractor produced between 1934 and 1941 and heavily used in World War II. It was powered by a 4-cylinder, 55 hp or, from 1936, 60 hp Krupp M 304 petrol engine. Its main purpose was to tow artillery, especially the 3.7 cm Pak 36 anti-tank gun (designated Kfz 69), and transport motorized infantry (designated Kfz 70).

This vehicle was extensively used on the Eastern Front, during the North African campaign and in France and Sicily. The "Krupp-Protze" was of relatively advanced design. Its fuel consumption was relatively high (24 Litres / 100 km on road) in comparison to the comparable Opel Blitz 1.5 t truck (16.5 liters / 100 km, produced 1938 - 1942).

Total production was about 7,000 units.

== Variants ==
A successful design, the Krupp-Protze was converted into several variants:

Kfz.19
Telephone truck
Kfz.21
Staff car
Kfz.68
Radio mast carrier
Kfz.69
Standard configuration for towing the 3.7 cm Pak 36 anti-tank gun. Carried 2 in front with 4 in a pair of forward and rear facing seats.
Kfz.70
Standard configuration for personnel carrying. carried 2 in front with 10 seated in the rear on benches.
Kfz.81
Ammo carrier conversion for 2 cm FlaK anti-aircraft gun, usually towed
Kfz.83
Generator carrier for anti-aircraft searchlight, usually towed
Sd.Kfz. 247 Ausf. A
Krupp built ten Ausf. A models on the chassis of its six-wheel Krupp Protze truck in 1937.

Sometimes anti-tank (37 mm Pak 36) and anti-air (2 cm Flak) guns were mounted directly on the truck bed (Portée).

== See also ==
- List of World War II military vehicles of Germany
- List of Sd.Kfz. designations
