= List of World War II military vehicles of Germany =

This is a list of World War II military vehicles of Germany.

== By name ==
20 mm FlaK 30 auf Fahrgestell Zugkraftwagen 1t	designation of the Sd.Kfz. 10/4
20 mm FlaK 38 auf Fahrgestell Zugkraftwagen 1t	designation of the Sd.Kfz. 10/5
20 mm FlaKv 38 auf Fahrgestell Panzerkampfwagen IV (Sf)	quad 20 mm version of the Möbelwagen
20 mm FlaKv 38 auf Fahrgestell Zugkraftwagen 8t	designation of the Sd.Kfz. 7/1
37 mm FlaK 36 auf Fahrgestell Zugkraftwagen 5t	designation of the Sd.Kfz. 6/2
37 mm FlaK 36 auf Fahrgestell Zugkraftwagen 8t	designation of the Sd.Kfz. 7/2
37 mm FlaK 43 auf Fahrgestell Panzerkampfwagen IV (Sf)	37 mm version of the Möbelwagen
37 mm FlaKz 43 auf Panzerkampfwagen Panther	full title for the Flakpanzer Coelian
37 mm PaK 35/36 auf Zugkraftwagen 1t	37 mm antitank version of the Sd.Kfz. 10
37 mm WD Schlepper 25PS	37 mm antitank gun mounted on a Schlepper 25PS
47 mm PaK(t) (Sf) auf Panzerkampfwagen I Ausf B	47 mm antitank gun on a Panzer I Ausf B
50 mm FlaK 41 auf Zugkraftwagen 8t	50 mm antiaircraft gun on a Sd.Kfz. 7
50 mm PaK 38 auf Fahrgestell Panzerkampfwagen II (Sf)	50 mm antitank gun of a Panzer II chassis
50 mm PaK 38 auf Gepanzerter Munitionsschlepper	50 mm antitank gun on a Borgward B III
50 mm PaK 38 auf Panzerkampfwagen II VK901	50 mm antitank gun on a Panzer II Ausf G
50 mm PaK 38 auf Zugkraftwagen 1t	50 mm antitank gun on a Sd.Kfz. 10
75 mm PaK 40/2 auf Fahrgestell Panzerkampfwagen II (Sf)	75 mm antitank gun on a Panzer II chassis
75 mm PaK 40/3 auf Panzerjäger 38(t)	75 mm antitank gun on a Marder III
75 mm PaK 40/3 auf Panzerkampfwagen 38(t) Ausf H	75 mm antitank gun on a Panzer 38(t) Ausf H
76.2 mm PaK 36(r) auf Fahrgestell Panzerkampfwagen II Ausf D	76.2 mm antitank gun on a Panzer II Ausf D chassis
76.2 mm PaK 36(r) auf Panzerjäger Selbstfahrlafette Zugkraftwagen 5t	76.2 mm Soviet antitank gun on a Sd.Kfz. 6
77 mm WD Schlepper 50PS	77 mm gun mounted on a Schlepper 50PS
88 mm FlaK 18 auf Zugkraftwagen 12t	88 mm antiaircraft version of the Sd.Kfz. 8
88 mm FlaK 18 auf Zugkraftwagen 18t	88 mm antiaircraft version of the Sd.Kfz. 9
88 mm FlaK 37 auf Sonderfahrgestell	88 mm antiaircraft version of specially designed chassis based on the Panzer IV
88 mm PaK 43/1 auf Geschützwagen III/IV	full title of the Nashorn
88 mm PaK 43/3 auf Fahrgestell Panther	title for the Jagdpanther
105 mm K 18 auf Panzer Selbstfahrlafette IV	105 mm gun carrier version of the Panzer IV
105 mm leFH 18/1 (Sf) auf Geschützwagen IV	105 mm howitzer version of the Panzer IV
105 mm leFH 18/1 auf Waffenträger GW IV	full designation for the Heuschrecke
105 mm leFH 18/2 auf Fahrgestell Panzerkampfwagen II (Sf)	full designation for the Wespe
105 mm leFH 18/40/2 auf Geschützwagen III/IV	105 mm howitzer on a Hummel chassis
150 mm sFH 18/1 auf Geschützwagen III/IV	full designation for the Hummel
150 mm sIG 33 (Sf) auf Fahrgestell Panzerkampfwagen II (Sf)	150 mm heavy infantry gun on a Panzer II chassis
150 mm sIG 33 (Sf) auf Panzerkampfwagen I Ausf B	150 mm heavy infantry gun on a Panzer I Ausf B
150 mm sIG 33/1 (Sf) auf Panzerkampfwagen 38(t) Ausf H	150 mm heavy infantry gun on a Panzer 38(t) Ausf H
150 mm sIG 33/1 (Sf) auf Selbstfahrlafette 38(t) (Sf) Ausf K	150 mm heavy infantry gun on a Panzer 38(t) Ausf K mount
150 mm sIG 33/2 (Sf) auf Jagdpanzer 38(t)	150 mm heavy infantry gun on a Hetzer

- Artillerie Panzerbeobachtungswagen - artillery observation post tank, multiple chassis variants
- Artillerie-Schlepper 35(t) - artillery tractor version of the Panzerkampfwagen 35(t)
- Aufklärer auf Fahrgestell Panzerkampfwagen 38(t) - reconnaissance vehicle on a Panzer 38(t) chassis
- Begleitwagen (secret/camouflage designation for the Panzer IV)
- Bergepanzer III (armored recovery vehicle version of the Panzer III)
- Bergepanzer IV (armored recovery vehicle version of the Panzer IV)
- Bergepanzer 38(t) (armored recovery vehicle version of the Jagdpanzer 38(t))
- Bergepanzer Tiger Ausf. E (recovery version of the Tiger I Ausf E)
- Bergepanzer Tiger (P) (recovery version of the Elefant)
- Bergepanzerwagen II (armoured engineer vehicle version of the Panzer II Ausf J)
- BMW R75 (two wheel drive motorcycle with side car)
- Borgward B I (company designation for the Minenräumwagen 3-wheel version)
- Borgward B II (company designation for the Minenräumwagen 4-wheel version)
- Borgward B III - armoured ammunition carrier
- Borgward B IV - heavy demolition charge layer
- Brückenleger auf Panzerkampfwagen I Ausf. A - bridge laying version of the Panzer I Ausf A
- Brückenleger auf Panzerkampfwagen II - bridge laying version of the Panzer II
- Brückenleger IV - bridge laying version of the Panzer IV
- Flakpanzer Coelian - Panther tank based twin 37 mm antiaircraft tank
- Durchbruchwagen - developmental name for concepts for the Tiger I
- Elefant - tank destroyer version of the Tiger I (P)
- Fahrgestell Panzerkampfwagen II (Sf) - Panzer II chassis used for self-propelled guns
- Fahrgestell Panzerkampfwagen III - Panzer III chassis
- Fahrgestell Panzerkampfwagen IV (Sf) - Panzer IV chassis used for self-propelled guns
- Fahrgestell Panzerkampfwagen 38(t) (Panzer 38(t) chassis)
- Fahrgestell Zugkraftwagen 1t (Sd.Kfz. 10 chassis)
- Fahrgestell Zugkraftwagen 5t (Sd.Kfz. 6 chassis)
- Ferdinand (early name for the Elefant)
- Feuerleitpanzerfahrzeug für V2 Raketen auf Zugkraftwagen 8t (V2 command post variant of the Sd.Kfz. 7)
- Flakpanzer I (self-propelled anti-aircraft gun on a Panzer I chassis)
- Flakpanzer IV mit 2 cm FlaK Vierling (title for the Wirbelwind)
- Flakpanzer IV mit 3 cm FlaK Vierling (title for the Zerstörer 45)
- Flakpanzer IV mit 3.7 cm FlaK (short title for the Ostwind I)
- Flakpanzer IV mit 3.7 cm FlaK Zwilling (title for the Ostwind II)
- Flakpanzer 38(t) auf Selbstfahrlafette 38(t) Ausf. L (antiaircraft tank version of the Panzer 38(t))
- Flamingo (common name for the Panzer II Flamm)
- Flammenwerfer auf Panzerkampfwagen I Ausf. A - flamethrowers mounted in a Panzer I Ausf. A
- Flammpanzer 38(t) - flamethrower version of the Jagdpanzer 38(t)
- Funkkraftwagen - designation for the Kfz 14
- Gefechtsaufklärer VK 1602 - combat reconnaissance version of the Panzer II
- Gepanzerter Mannschaftstransportwagen (title for the Kätzchen)
- Gepanzerter Munitionsschlepper (full title for the Borgward B III)
- Gepanzerte Selbstfahrlafette für Sturmgeschütz (full title for the StuG III)
- Gepanzerte Selbstfahrlafette für Sturmgeschütz (Fl) (flamethrower version of the StuG III)
- Gepanzerte Selbstfahrlafette für Sturmhaubitze (full title for the StuH 42)
- Gepanzerte Selbstfahrlafette für Sturminfanteriegeschütz (full title for the StuIG 33B)
- Gepanzerter Zugkraftwagen 8t (designation for the Sd.Kfz. 7)
- Gerät 35 (equipment number for the ammunition carrier version of the Panzer I)
- Gerät 040 (equipment number for the 60 cm armed Karlgerät)
- Gerät 041 (equipment number for the 54 cm armed Karlgerät)
- Gerät 46 (equipment number for the Panther tank)
- Gerät 67 (equipment number for the Goliath vehicle with E-motor)
- Gerät 71 (equipment number for the Schwere Wehrmachtschlepper)
- Gerät 80 (equipment number for the Sd.Kfz. 221)
- Gerät 81 (equipment number for the Sd.Kfz. 222)
- Gerät 82 (equipment number for the Sd.Kfz. 223)
- Gerät 83 (equipment number for the Sd.Kfz. 260)
- Gerät 84 (equipment number for the Sd.Kfz. 261)
- Gerät 89 (equipment number for the Sd.Kfz. 250)
- Gerät 90 (equipment number for the Sd.Kfz. 251)
- Gerät 383 (equipment number for the Panzerkampfwagen E-100)
- Gerät 550 (equipment number for the Panzer IV Ausf J)
- Gerät 554 (equipment number for the Flakpanzer Coelian)
- Gerät 555 (equipment number for the Hetzer)
- Gerät 556 (equipment number for the Kugelblitz)
- Gerät 558 (equipment number for the Panzer IV/70(A) version of the Panzer IV)
- Gerät 559 (equipment number for the Panzer IV/70(V) version of the Panzer IV)
- Gerät 573 (equipment number for the engineer version of the Hetzer)
- Gerät 582 (equipment number for the Ostwind I)
- Gerät 587 (equipment number for the weapons carrier version of the Panzer 38(t))
- Gerät 588 (equipment number for the sIG 33 version of the Hetzer)
- Gerät 671 (equipment number for the Goliath vehicle with V-motor)
- Gerät 672 (equipment number for the Goliath vehicle with V-motor)
- Gerät 680 (equipment number for the Springer vehicle)
- Gerät 690 (equipment number for the Borgward B IV)
- Gerät 803 (equipment number for the Wespe)
- Gerät 805 (equipment number for the Grille (architecture) PzKpfw 38(t) version)
- Gerät 806 (equipment number for the Grille (architecture) Sfl 38(t) version)
- Gerät 807 (equipment number for the Hummel)
- Gerät 811 (equipment number for the Geschützwagen Panther version of the Panther tank)
- Gerät 820 (equipment number for the StuG IV)
- Gerät 821 (equipment number for the Jagdpanzer IV version of the Panzer IV)
- Gerät 892 (equipment number for the cable-laying version of the Sd.Kfz. 250)
- Gerät 893 (equipment number for the radio carrier version of the Sd.Kfz. 250)
- Geschützwagen III/IV - title for the Hummel and Nashorn chassis
- Geschützwagen IV (title for the gun carrier version of the Panzer IV
- Geschützwagen Panther (Gun carrier version of the Panther tank
- Geschützwagen Tiger (Gun carrier version of the Tiger II)
- Goliath vehicle - remote-control demolition charge
- Grille (architecture) (popular name for the sIG 33 version of the Panzer 38(t))
- Grosstraktor - early medium tank design
- Hetzer - popular but wrong name for the Jagdpanzer 38(t)
- Hornisse - earlier name for the Nashorn
- Hummel (popular name for the 15 cm howitzer armed Geschützwagen III/IV)
- Infanterie Sturmsteg auf Fahrgestell Panzerkampfwagen IV (infantry assault bridge version of the Panzer IV)
- Instandsetzungskraftwagen I (maintenance vehicle version of the Panzer I)
- Jagdpanther (common name for the 88 mm antitank gun-armed tank destroyer version of the Panther tank)
- Jagdpanzer IV (Panzer IV-hulled casemate style tank destroyer)
- Jagdpanzer 38(d) (German development project for the Jagdpanzer 38(t))
- Jagdpanzer 38(t) (correct name for the Hetzer)
- Jagdtiger (128 mm antitank gun armed tank destroyer version of the Tiger II)
- Karl-Gerät (self-propelled siege mortar)
- Kätzchen (armoured personnel carrier)
- Kfz 13 (machine gun car)
- Kfz 14 (radio car)
- Kleiner Panzerbefehlswagen (light command tank version of the Panzer I)
- Kleiner Panzerfunkwagen (designation for the Sd.Kfz. 260 and Sd.Kfz. 261)
- Kleines Kettenkraftrad HK 101 (Sd.Kfz. 2, little tracked motorcycle)
- Königstiger (common alternative name for the Tiger II)
- Krupp Minenraumer S (anti-mine vehicle)
- Krupp Traktor LaS (company name for the Panzer I)
- Ladungsleger auf Panzerkampfwagen I Ausf. B (explosives laying gear mounted on a Panzer I Ausf. B)
- Land-Wasser-Schlepper (amphibious tractor)
- LaS (abbreviation for Landwirtschaftlicher Schlepper, secret/camouflage designation for the Panzer I; also used for Panzer II)
- LaS 100 (company name for the Panzer II)
- LaS 138 (company name for Christie suspension version of the Panzer II)
- LaS 762 (company name for the Panzer Selbstfahrlafette 1 für 7.62 cm Pak 36 version of the Panzer II, later renamed Marder II)
- LaS Maybach (cover name for Panzer I Ausf. B)
- Leichter Beobachtungswagen (artillery observation post version of the Sd.Kfz. 250)
- Leichter Einheitswaffenträger (development project for a light weapons carrier version of the Panzer 38(t))
- Leichter Fernsprechpanzerwagen (title for the cable-laying version of the Sd.Kfz. 250)
- Leichter Flakpanzer IV (title for the Kugelblitz)
- Leichter Funkpanzerwagen (title for the radio carrying version of the Sd.Kfz. 250)
- Leichter gepanzerter Beobachtungskraftwagen (title for the Sd.Kfz. 253)
- Leichter gepanzerter Kraftwagen (early designation for the Sd.Kfz. 250)
- Leichter gepanzerter Munitionskraftwagen (designation for the Sd.Kfz. 252)
- Leichter Ladungsträger Goliath (title for the Goliath tracked mine)
- Leichter Messtruppanzerwagen (survey vehicle version of the Sd.Kfz. 250)
- Leichter Munitionspanzerwagen (ammunition carrier version of the Sd.Kfz. 250)
- Leichter Panzerspähwagen (Fu) (designation for the Sd.Kfz. 223)
- Leichter Panzerspähwagen (MG) (designation for the Sd.Kfz. 221)
- Leichter Panzerspähwagen (2 cm) (designation for the Sd.Kfz. 222)
- Leichter Schützenpanzerwagen (later designation for the Sd.Kfz. 250)
- Leichter Truppenluftschützenpanzerwagen (designation for the light antiaircraft version of the Sd.Kfz. 250)
- Leichter Wehrmachtschlepper (program for light utility tractor)
- Leichttraktor (early light tank design)
- Leopard (popular name for the Gefechtsaufklärer VK1602 version of the Panzer II)
- Luchs - popular name for the Panzer II Ausf. L
- LWS (abbreviation for the Land-Wasser-Schlepper)
- Marder I (popular name for the 75 mm antitank gun on a Lorraine 37L chassis)
- Marder II (popular name for the 75 mm antitank gun on a Panzer II chassis)
- Marder III (popular name for the tank hunter version of the Panzer 38(t))
- Maschinengewehrkraftwagen (designation for the Kfz 13)
- Maultier (halftrack conversion of various trucks)
- Maus (common name for the Panzer VIII Maus)
- Minenräumpanzer III (mine destroyer version of the Panzer III)
- Minenräumwagen (remote control mine destroyer)
- Mittlerer Einheitswaffenträger (development project for a medium universal weapons carrier version of the Panzer 38(t))
- Mittlerer Funkpanzerwagen (radio carrier version of the Sd.Kfz. 251)
- Mittlerer gepanzerter Beobachtungskraftwagen (designation for the Saurer RR-7)
- Mittlerer gepanzerter Mannschaftskraftwagen (early designation for the Sd.Kfz. 251)
- Mittlerer Kommandopanzerwagen (command post version of the Sd.Kfz. 251)
- Mittlerer Krankenpanzerwagen (ambulance version of the Sd.Kfz. 251)
- Mittlerer Ladungsträger (title for the Springer vehicle)
- Mittlerer Pionierpanzerwagen (engineer version of the Sd.Kfz. 251)
- Mittlerer Schützenpanzerwagen (designation for the Sd.Kfz. 251
- Möbelwagen (common name for 20 mm and 37 mm antiaircraft versions of the Panzer IV)
- Mörser Zugmittel 35(t) (mortar tractor version of the Panzer 35(t))
- Mörserträger auf Fahrgestell Panzerkampfwagen 38(t) (mortar carrier on a Panzer 38(t) chassis)
- Munitionspanzer 38(t) (Sf) Ausf. K (ammunition carrier version of the Grille (architecture))
- Munitionspanzer auf Fahrgestell Panzerkampfwagen III (ammunition carrier using a Panzer III chassis)
- Munitionspanzer auf Fahrgestell Sturmgeschütz III (ammunition carrier version of the StuG III)
- Munitionsschlepper auf Fahrgestell Panzerkampfwagen 38(t) (ammunition carrier using a Panzer 38(t) chassis)
- Munitionsschlepper auf Panzerkampfwagen I Ausf. A (ammunition carrier version of the Panzer I Ausf. A)
- Munitionsschlepper für Karlgerät (ammunition carrier for the Gerät 040 based on the Panzer IV Ausf. D)
- Munitions Selbstfahrlafette auf Fahrgestell Panzerkampfwagen II (ammunition carrier version of the Wespe)
- Nashorn - later name for the 8.8 cm armed self-propelled antitank gun on Geschützwagen III/IV chassis, formerly known as Hornisse
- Neubaufahrzeug - early multi-turret medium tank design
- Ostwind - popular name for the Flakpanzer IV mit 3.7 cm FlaK
- Panther tank (name for the Panzerkampfwagen V)
- Jagdpanzer IV/70 (75 mm L/70 gun armed assault gun version of the Jagdpanzer IV, also Panzer IV/70)
- Panzerbefehlswagen III (command tank version of the Panzer III)
- Panzerbefehlswagen IV (command tank version of the Panzer IV)
- Panzerbefehlswagen Panther (command tank version of the Panther tank)
- Panzerbeobachtungswagen IV (artillery observation post version of the Panzer IV)
- Panzerbeobachtungswagen Panther (artillery observation post version of the Panther tank)
- Panzerfähre (armoured ferry version of the Panzer IV)
- Panzerjäger I (short title for the 4.7 PaK(t) (Sf) on a Panzer I Ausf B)
- Panzerjäger 38(t) (standard designation for the Marder III version of the Panzer 38(t))
- Panzerjägerwagen 638 (alternative designation for the Hetzer)
- Panzerkampfwagen I (full title for the Panzer I)
- Panzerkampfwagen I nA (interleaved suspension version of the Panzer I, the Ausf C)
- Panzerkampfwagen I nA Verstärkt (reinforced version of the Panzer I, the Ausf F)
- Panzerkampfwagen I ohne Aufbau (Panzer I without superstructure)
- Panzerkampfwagen II (full title for the Panzer II)
- Panzerkampfwagen II Flamm (flamethrower version of the Panzer II)
- Panzerkampfwagen II mit Schwimmkörper (Panzer II with amphibious floats)
- Panzerkampfwagen II nA (interleaved suspension version of the Panzer II, the Ausf G)
- Panzerkampfwagen II nA Verstärkt (reinforced version of the Panzer II, the Ausf J)
- Panzerkampfwagen II ohne Aufbau (Panzer II without superstructure)
- Panzerkampfwagen III (full title for the Panzer III)
- Panzerkampfwagen III (Fl) (flamethrower version of the Panzer III)
- Panzerkampfwagen IV (full title for the Panzer IV)
- Panzerkampfwagen V (full title for the Panther tank)
- Panzerkampfwagen VI (full title for the VK30.01, VK36.01, Tiger I and Tiger II tanks)
- Panzerkampfwagen VII (full title for the Panzer VII)
- Panzerkampfwagen VIII (full name for the Panzer VIII Maus)
- Panzerkampfwagen 35(t) (full title for the Panzer 35(t) captured LT vz 35)
- Panzerkampfwagen 38(t) (full title for the Panzer 38(t) Czech LT vz 38)
- Panzerkampfwagen E-25 (experimental assault gun design)
- Panzerkampfwagen E-50 (experimental medium tank design)
- Panzerkampfwagen E-75 (experimental heavy tank design)
- Panzerkampfwagen E-100 (experimental super heavy tank design)
- Panzerkampfwagen T-25 (designation for the Skoda T-25)
- Panzerspähwagen II (reconnaissance version of the Panzer II)
- Panzerspähwagen T-15 (designation for the Skoda T-15)
- Panzer-Bergegerät (recovery vehicle version of the Panther tank)
- Panzer Selbstfahrlafette 1 (armoured self-propelled mount version of the Panzer II)
- Panzer Selbstfahrlafette IV (armored self-propelled mount version of the Panzer IV)
- Panzer Selbstfahrlafette V (armored self-propelled mount version of the Tiger I)
- Pionierkampfwagen II (engineer fighting vehicle version of the Panzer II)
- Pionierpanzerwagen auf Fahrgestell Panzerkampfwagen III (armored engineer vehicle version of the Panzer III)
- Porsche 205 (company designation for the Panzer VIII Maus)
- Raupenschlepper, Ost (light tractor)
- RSO (abbreviation for the Raupenschlepper, Ost)
- Saurer RR-7 (artillery tractor and observation post)
- Schützenpanzerwagen auf Fahrgestell Panzerkampfwagen 38(t) (armored infantry vehicle version of the Panzer 38(t))
- Schwerer Ladungsträger (title for the Borgward B IV)
- Schwerer Panzerspähwagen (designation for the Sd.Kfz. 231)
- Schwerer Wagen (developmental program name for the Panzer VII)
- Schwerer Wehrmachtschlepper (heavy military carrier)
- Sd.Kfz. - abbreviation for "special purpose vehicle"; see list of Sd.Kfz. designations
- Selbstfahrlafette 38(t) (self-propelled mount version of the Panzer 38(t))
- Sonderschlepper B III (alternative title for the Borgward B III)
- Sonderschlepper B IV (alternative title for the Borgward B IV)
- Springer vehicle (demolition laying vehicle)
- Sturmgeschütz III (shortened title for the StuG III assault gun)
- Sturmgeschütz IV (title of the StuG IV assault gun)
- Sturmgeschütz mit 8.8 cm PaK 43/2 (full title of the Elefant)
- Sturmmörser Tiger (assault rocket mortar version of the Tiger I)
- Sturmpanther (proposal for 15 cm sIG armed assault version of the Panther tank)
- Sturmpanzer I (early self-propelled assault gun)
- Sturmpanzer II (self-propelled assault gun)
- Sturmpanzer IV (title of the Brummbär)
- Tauchpanzer III (amphibious version of the Panzer III)
- Tauchpanzer IV (amphibious version of the Panzer IV)
- Tiger I (common name for the Panzerkampfwagen VI Ausf E)
- Tiger II (common name for the Panzerkampfwagen VI Ausf B)
- VK302 (experimental designation for the Borgward B III)
- VK601 (experimental designation for the Panzer I Ausf C)
- VK901 (experimental designation for the Panzer II Ausf G)
- VK903 (experimental designation for the Panzer II Ausf H)
- VK1301 (experimental designation for the Panzer II Ausf M)
- VK1303 (experimental designation for the Panzer II Ausf L)
- VK1601 (experimental designation for the Panzer II Ausf J)
- VK1602 (experimental designation for the combat reconnaissance version of the Panzer II)
- VK1801 (experimental designation for the Panzer I Ausf F)
- VK2001(D) (experimental designation for the Daimler proposal for the Panzer IV)
- VK2001(K) (experimental designation for the Krupp proposal for the Panzer IV)
- VK2001(Rh) (experimental designation for the Rheinmetall proposal for the Panzer IV)
- VK2002(MAN) (experimental designation for the MAN proposal for the Panzer IV)
- VK3001(H) (experimental designation for the Henschel proposal for the Tiger I)
- VK3001(P) (experimental designation for the Porsche proposal for the Tiger I)
- VK3002(MAN) (experimental designation for the Panther tank)
- VK3002(DB) (experimental designation for the Daimler-Benz proposal for the Panther tank)
- VK3601(H) (experimental designation for the Henschel development vehicle for the Tiger I)
- VK4501(H) (experimental designation for the Henschel production vehicle for the Tiger I)
- VK4501(P) (experimental designation for the Porsche proposal for the Tiger I(P))
- VK4502(P) (experimental designation for the Porsche development vehicle Porsch Typ 180 (front turret) and Porsche Typ 181 (central turret) for the Tiger II )
- VK4503 (experimental designation for the Henschel development vehicle for the Tiger II)
- VK6501(H) (experimental designation for the Henschel proposal for the Panzer VII)
- VK7201(K) (experimental designation)
- Volkswagen Kübelwagen (military version of the Volkswagen. A later version sold in the US as the Thing.)
- Volkswagen Schwimmwagen (amphibious variant of the Volkswagen Kübelwagen)
- VsKfz 617 (experimental designation for the Panzer I Ausf A)
- VsKfz 622 (experimental designation for the Panzer II Ausf a)
- Waffenträger Geschützwagen IV (title for the Heuschrecke 10)
- Wespe (common name for the 10.5 cm leFH 18/2 auf Fahrgestell Panzerkampfwagen II (Sf))
- Wirbelwind (common name for the quad 20 mm armed version of the Flakpanzer IV)
- Wurfrahmen 40 (a self-propelled multiple rocket launcher)
- Zugführerwagen (secret/camouflage designation for the Panzer III)
- Zugkraftwagen 1t (designation for the Sd.Kfz. 10)
- Zugkraftwagen 3t (designation for the Sd.Kfz. 11)
- Zugkraftwagen 5t (designation for the Sd.Kfz. 6)
- Zugkraftwagen 8t (designation for the Sd.Kfz. 7)
- Zugkraftwagen 12t (designation for the Sd.Kfz. 8)
- Zugkraftwagen 18t (designation for the Sd.Kfz. 9)
- Zündapp KS 750 (two wheel drive motorcycle with side car)

== See also ==
- List of military vehicles of World War II § Germany
- German armoured fighting vehicles of World War II
- German tanks in World War II
- List of Sd.Kfz. designations
