= List of Sd.Kfz. designations =

Sonderkraftfahrzeug (abbreviated Sd.Kfz., German for "special purpose vehicle") was the ordnance inventory designation used by Nazi Germany before and during World War II for military vehicles; for example Sd.Kfz. 101 for the Panzer I, and Sd.Kfz. 251 for the armored personnel carrier made by Hanomag.

The Reichswehr and its successor, the Wehrmacht began systematically allocating numbers to its vehicles from around 1930, including horse-drawn vehicles, cars and trucks, combat vehicles, and trailers. Sd.Kfz. numbers were assigned to armored, tracked, and half-tracked vehicles. Cars and trucks were allocated Kfz. numbers and trailers were designated with Anh. (Anhänger) and Sd.Anh. numbers.

== Sd.Kfz. numbering system ==
Allocation of the numbered series was as follows:

- Sd.Kfz. 1 to 99: Unarmoured half-tracked vehicles
- Sd.Kfz. 100 to 199: Tanks and tank variants, including tank destroyers and self-propelled artillery
  - Sd.Kfz. 101 to 120: Panzer I and variants
  - Sd.Kfz. 121 to 140: Panzer II and variants (Note: The Pz. Kpfw. II Ausf. L (Sd.Kfz. 123) was placed in the 100-series as a tank variant, although it was designed and named as a reconnaissance vehicle (usually the 200 series)) and Panzer 38(t) and variants
  - Sd.Kfz. 141 to 160: Panzer III and variants
  - Sd.Kfz. 161 to 170: Panzer IV and variants
  - Sd.Kfz. 171 to 180: Panzer V (Panther) and variants
  - Sd.Kfz. 181 and above: Panzer VI (Tiger) and variants
- Sd.Kfz. 200 to 299: Armored cars (reconnaissance), armored half-tracked personnel carriers, and command tanks
- Sd.Kfz. 300 and above: Radio-controlled mine-clearing tanks and demolition charge-laying vehicles

Some combat vehicles, often based on existing vehicles in the Sd.Kfz. series and produced in relatively small numbers, weren't allocated a number and were only described with a name.

== Designations ==
=== Sd.Kfz. 1 to 99 ===
- Sd.Kfz. 1 (Krupp/Daimler Geschützkraftwagen Kraftwagen 19; number later deleted)
- Sd.Kfz. 2 (Krupp/Daimler Tractor; number later reassigned)
- Sd.Kfz. 2 (Kettenkrad light half-track "tracked motorcycle")
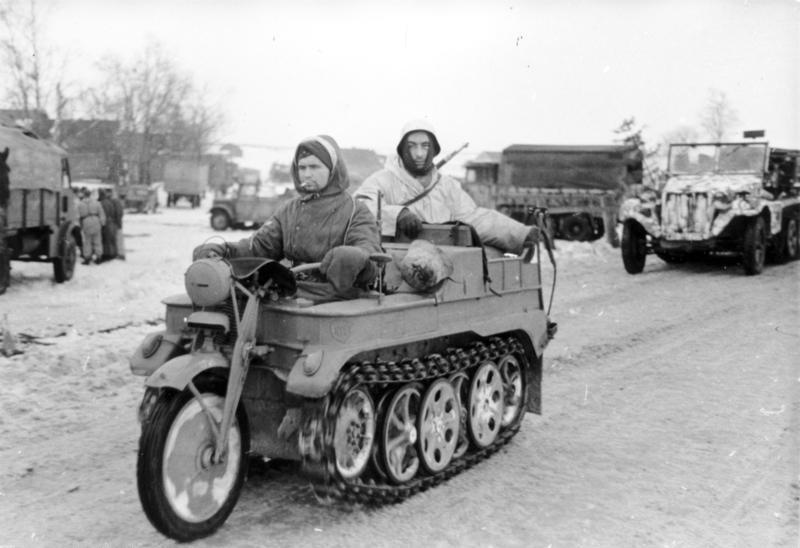
  Kettenkrad Sd.Kfz. 2 in Russia
  - Sd.Kfz. 2/1 (Field cable-laying variant for long distance field cable Feldfernkabel)
  - Sd.Kfz. 2/2 (Field cable-laying variant for heavy field cable Schweres Feldkabel)
- Sd.Kfz. 3 (Armored version of Daimler DZVR; number later reassigned)
- Sd.Kfz. 3 (Maultier 2-ton half-track truck)
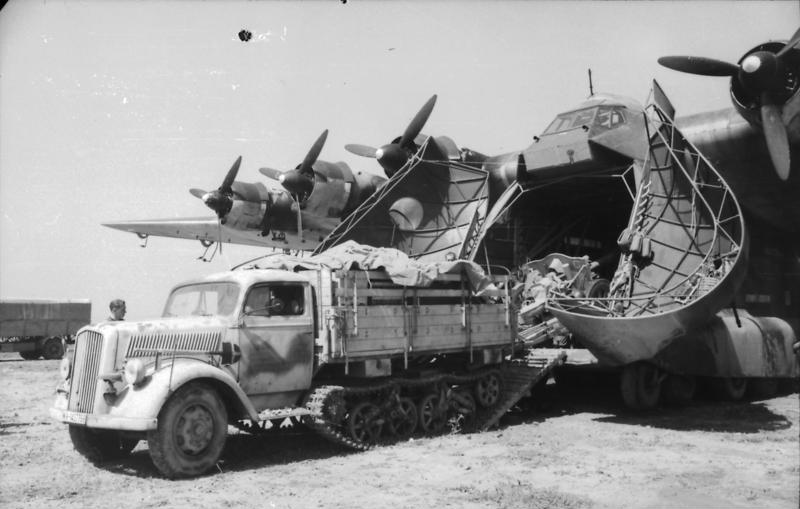
  Sd.Kfz. 3 (Maultier) unloaded from a Messerschmitt Me 323 "Gigant" transport aircraft
  - Sd.Kfz. 3a (Maultier based on Opel Blitz 3.6)
  - Sd.Kfz. 3b (Maultier based on Ford V 3000)
  - Sd.Kfz. 3c (Maultier based on Magirus Type S)
  - Sd.Kfz. 3/4 (Maultier with closed body; based on Ford or Opel chassis)
  - Sd.Kfz. 3/5 (4.5-ton half-track truck based on Mercedes-Benz L 4500; sometimes called Sd.Kfz. 4)
- Sd.Kfz. 4 (3-ton aviation fuel tanker, based on Mercedes-Benz LG 3000; possibly introduced as Kfz.384)
- Sd.Kfz. 4 (2-ton armored version of Maultier half-track truck as ammunition carrier)
  - Sd.Kfz. 4/1 (15 cm Nebelwerfer 42 rocket launcher on 2-ton Opel Maultier chassis)
- Sd.Kfz. 5 (3-ton aviation fuel tanker, based on Krupp L3 H63/H163; likely only a prototype)
- Sd.Kfz. 6 (5-ton medium halftrack with engineer superstructure)
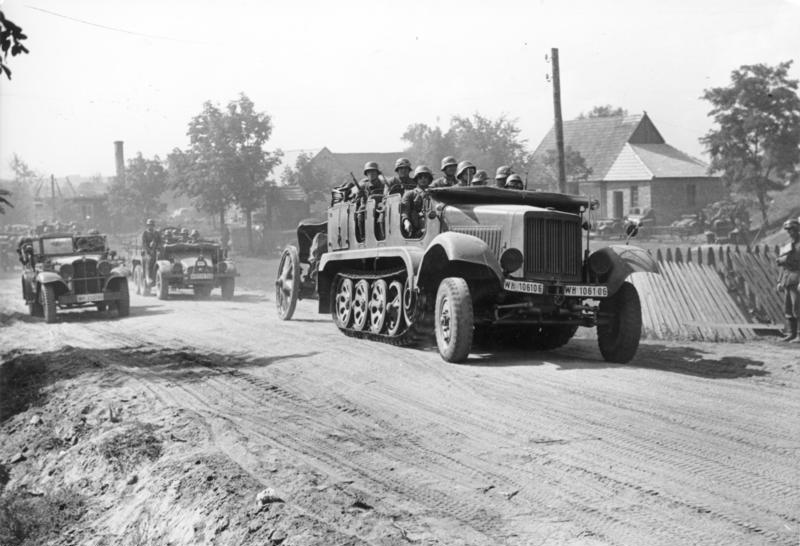
  Sd.Kfz. 6
  - Sd.Kfz. 6/1 (5-ton medium half-track with artillery superstructure)
  - Sd.Kfz. 6/2 (self-propelled 37 mm antiaircraft gun)
  - Sd.Kfz. 6/3 "Sd.Kfz. 6 mit 7.62 cm FK 36(r)", half track carrying a captured Soviet 76mm M1936 (F-22) gun portee in an armored superstructure)
- Sd.Kfz. 7 (8-ton medium half-track)
  - Sd.Kfz. 7/1 (self-propelled 20 mm quadruple anti-aircraft gun)
  - Sd.Kfz. 7/2 (self-propelled 37 mm antiaircraft gun)
  - Sd.Kfz. 7/3 (armored fire-control vehicle for V-2 rockets on 8-ton towing vehicle)
  - Sd.Kfz. 7/6 (variant for anti-aircraft range finding)
  - Sd.Kfz. 7/8 (variant with engineer superstructure)
  - Sd.Kfz. 7/9 (variant with artillery superstructure)
- Sd.Kfz. 8 (12-ton heavy half-track)
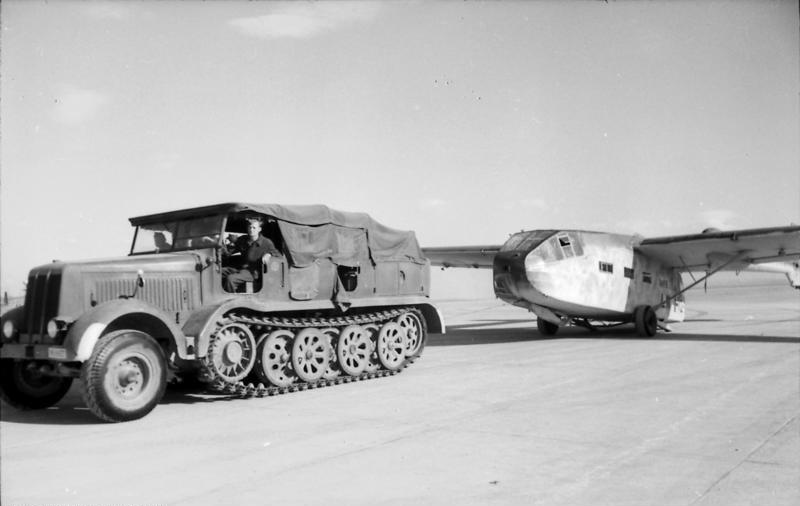
  Sd.Kfz. 8 half-track towing Gotha Go 242 glider
  - Sd.Kfz. 8/1 (12-ton heavy half-track)
  - Sd.Kfz. 8/5 (12-ton heavy half-track with artillery superstructure)
- Sd.Kfz. 9 (18-ton heavy half-track)
  - Sd.Kfz. 9/1 (halftrack mounted 6 ton crane)
  - Sd.Kfz. 9/2 (halftrack mounted 10 ton crane)
  - Sd.Kfz. 9/6 (tractor with 40-ton winch)
- Sd.Kfz. 10 (1-ton light halftrack)
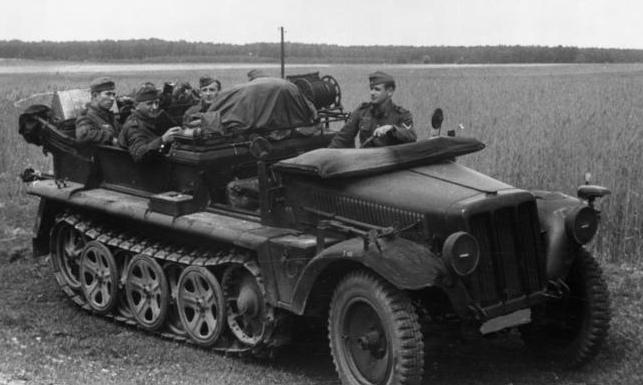
  Sd.Kfz. 10
  - Sd.Kfz. 10/1 (light gas detection vehicle)
  - Sd.Kfz. 10/2 (light decontamination vehicle)
  - Sd.Kfz. 10/3 (light decontamination sprayer vehicle)
  - Sd.Kfz. 10/4 (self-propelled 20 mm Flak 30 antiaircraft gun)
  - Sd.Kfz. 10/5 (self-propelled 20 mm Flak 38 antiaircraft gun)
- Sd.Kfz. 11 (3-ton light halftrack)
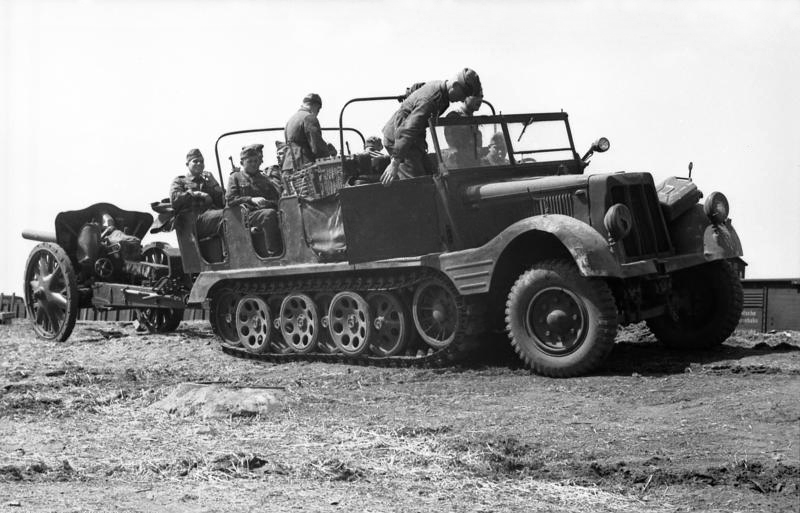
  Sd.Kfz. 11
  - Sd.Kfz. 11/1 (carrier for 10 cm Nebelwerfer 35 and 10 cm Nebelwerfer 40 mortars)
    - Sd.Kfz. 11/1 (designation re-issued in 1944: self-propelled 20 mm Flak 38 antiaircraft gun)
  - Sd.Kfz. 11/2 (medium decontamination vehicle)
  - Sd.Kfz. 11/3 (medium decontamination spraying vehicle)
  - Sd.Kfz. 11/4 (smoke-generation vehicle)
  - Sd.Kfz. 11/5 (medium gas detection vehicle)
- Sd.Kfz. 20 (35-ton armored recovery vehicle; based on Russian T-34 and KV-1)

=== Sd.Kfz. 100 to 199 ===
- Sd.Kfz. 101 Panzer I Ausf. A, B, C and F light tank
- Sd.Kfz. 111 Panzer I ammunition carrier variant
- Sd.Kfz. 121 Panzer II Ausf. a to F light tank
- Sd.Kfz. 122 Panzer II (Flamm) flame tank
- Sd.Kfz. 123 Panzer II Ausf. L "Luchs" reconnaissance tank
- Sd.Kfz. 124 Wespe self-propelled 10.5 cm leFH 18 howitzer on Panzer II chassis
- Sd.Kfz. 128 Panzer II (50 mm KwK 39 L/60), VK 16.02 Leopard
- Sd.Kfz. 131 Marder II self-propelled 7.5 cm Pak 40 anti-tank gun on Panzer II chassis
- Sd.Kfz. 132 Marder II self-propelled Soviet 7.62 cm Pak 36(r) antitank gun
- Sd.Kfz. 135 - Marder I Panzerjäger tank destroyer on captured French Lorraine 37L tracked carrier
  - Sd.Kfz. 135/1 (self-propelled 150 mm howitzer)
- Sd.Kfz. 136 Bergepanzerwagen 38
- Sd.Kfz. 138 (Marder III self-propelled 75 mm anti-tank gun)
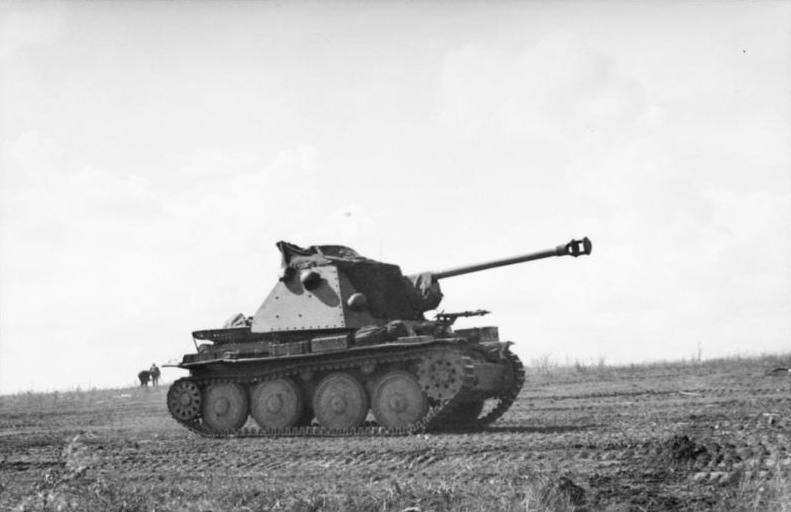
  Marder III Ausf. H (Sd.Kfz. 138)
  - Sd.Kfz. 138/1 - Grille self-propelled 150 mm sIG 33 infantry gun on Panzer 38(t) chassis
  - Sd.Kfz. 138/2 - "Hetzer" jagdpanzer based on the Panzer 38(t) chassis
- Sd.Kfz. 139 - Marder III self-propelled 76.2 mm anti-tank gun
- Sd.Kfz. 140 - Flakpanzer 38(t) (Flakpanzer 38(t) auf Selbstfahrlafette 38(t) Ausf M) self-propelled 20 mm anti-aircraft gun on a Panzer 38(t) chassis
  - Sd.Kfz. 140/1 - armored reconnaissance vehicle based on the Panzer 38(t)
- Sd.Kfz. 141 - Panzer III medium tank with 37 mm or 50 mm L/42 main gun
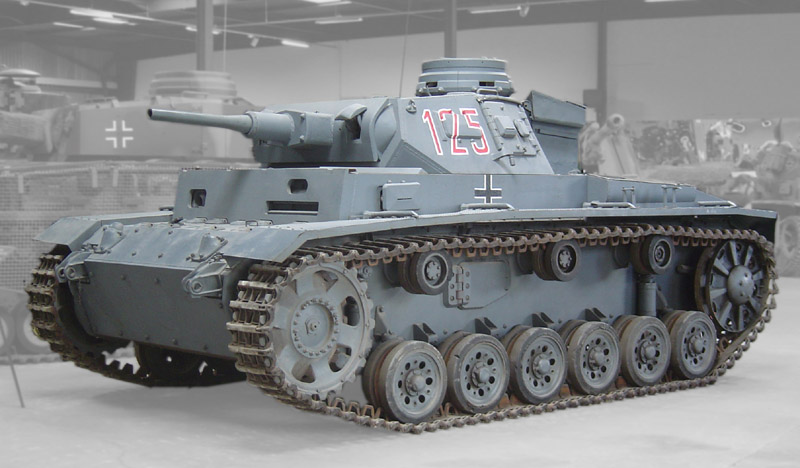
  Panzer III Ausf. F (Sd.Kfz. 141)
  - Sd.Kfz. 141/1 - Panzer III medium tank with 50 mm L/60 main gun)
  - Sd.Kfz. 141/2 - Panzer III medium tank with short-barrelled 75 mm KwK 37 main gun
- Sd.Kfz. 142 - Sturmgeschütz III assault gun with 75 mm L/24 main gun
  - Sd.Kfz. 142/1 - Sturmgeschütz III assault gun with 75 mm L/43 or L/48 main gun
  - Sd.Kfz. 142/2 - StuH 42 assault gun with 105 mm L/28 main gun
- Sd.Kfz. 143 - Panzer III based artillery observation post
- Sd.Kfz. 144 - Bergepanzerwagen III
- Sd.Kfz. 161 - Panzer IV medium tank with 75 mm L/24 main gun
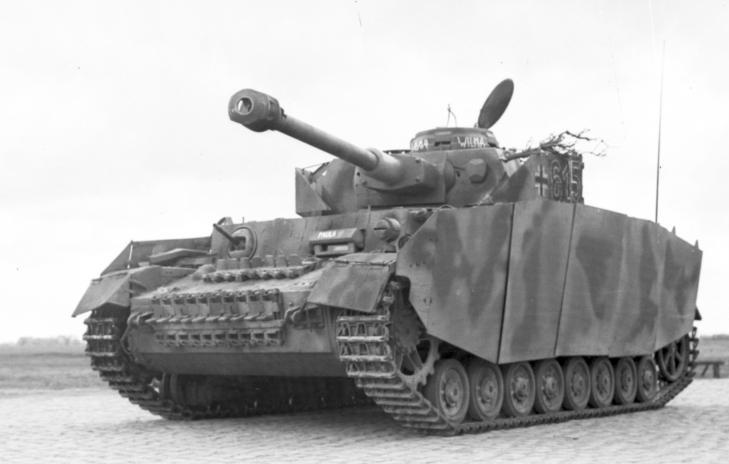
  Panzer IV Sd.Kfz. 161 with Schurzen side skirts
  - Sd.Kfz. 161/1 - Panzer IV medium tank with 75 mm L/43 main gun
  - Sd.Kfz. 161/2 - Panzer IV medium tank with 75 mm L/48 main gun
  - Sd.Kfz. 161/3 - Möbelwagen self-propelled 37 mm antiaircraft gun
  - Sd.Kfz. 161/4 -Wirbelwind self-propelled 20 mm x 4 antiaircraft gun
- Sd.Kfz. 162 - Jagdpanzer IV tank destroyer with 75 mm L/48 main gun on Panzer IV chassis
  - Sd.Kfz. 162/1 - Jagdpanzer IV with 75 mm L/70 main gun)
- Sd.Kfz. 163 - Sturmgeschütz IV for Sturmkanone 40 (L/48)
- Sd.Kfz. 164 - Nashorn (until 1944 known as Hornisse) panzerjäger tank destroyer with 88 mm Pak 43 main gun)
- Sd.Kfz. 165 - Hummel self-propelled 150 mm artillery
  - Sd.Kfz. 165/1 - Heuschrecke 10 self-propelled 105 mm artillery
- Sd.Kfz. 166 - Brummbär self-propelled 150 mm infantry gun
- Sd.Kfz. 167 - Sturmgeschütz IV assault gun with 75 mm L/48 main gun
- Sd.Kfz. 171 - Panther tank
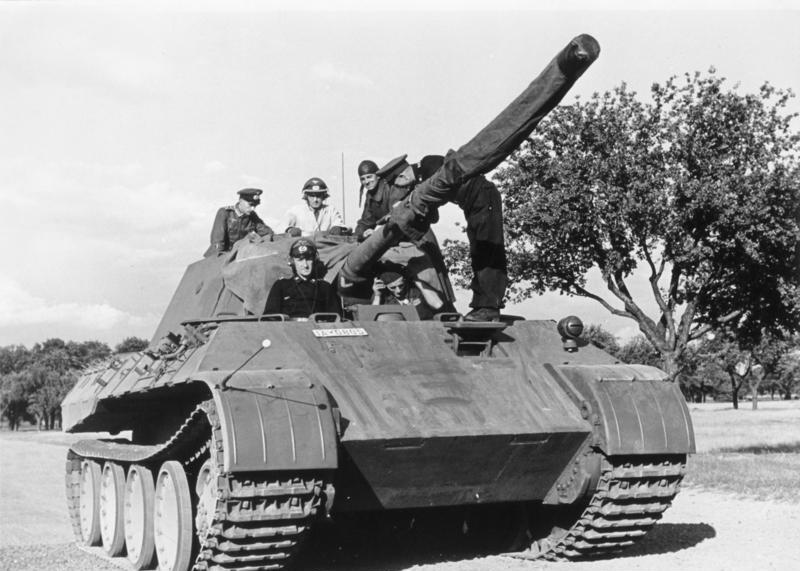
  Panther Sd.Kfz. 171
- Sd.Kfz. 172 - proposed assault gun variant of Panther tank
- Sd.Kfz. 173 - Jagdpanther (Panzerjäger Panther) tank destroyer
- Sd.Kfz. 179 - Bergepanther recovery variant
- Sd.Kfz. 181 - Tiger I heavy tank
- Sd.Kfz. 182 - Tiger II ("Panzerkampfwagen Tiger Ausf. B") heavy tank
- Sd.Kfz. 184 - Ferdinand/Elefant "Panzerjäger Tiger (P)" tank destroyer
- Sd.Kfz. 185 - Jagdtiger tank destroyer with 88 mm L/71 main gun due to lack of supply of 128mm gun
- Sd.Kfz. 186 - Jagdtiger tank destroyer with 12.8 cm Pak 44 main gun

=== Sd.Kfz. 200 to 299 ===
- Sd.Kfz. 221 (Leichter Panzerspähwagen with 7.92 mm machinegun)
- Sd.Kfz. 222 (Leichter Panzerspähwagen with 2 cm KwK 30 gun)
- Sd.Kfz. 223 (Leichter Panzerspähwagen with radio gear)
- Sd.Kfz. 231 6-rad (Schwerer Panzerspähwagen (6 wheel) with 2 cm KwK 30 gun)
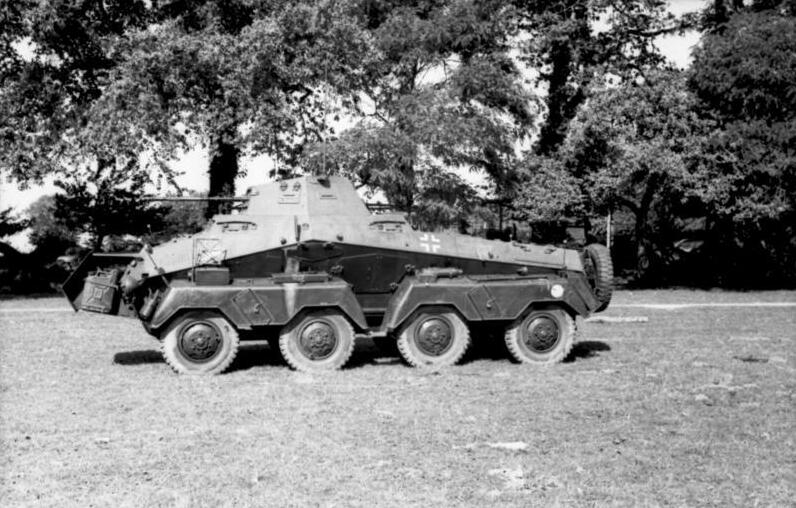
  Sd.Kfz. 231
- Sd.Kfz. 231 8-rad (Schwerer Panzerspähwagen (8 wheel) with 2 cm KwK 30 gun)
- Sd.Kfz. 232 6-rad (Schwerer Panzerspähwagen (6 wheel) with medium range and short range radios)
- Sd.Kfz. 232 8-rad (Schwerer Panzerspähwagen (8 wheel) with radio gear)
- Sd.Kfz. 233 (Schwerer Panzerspähwagen with 7.5 cm KwK 37 gun)
- Sd.Kfz. 234 (Schwerer Panzerspähwagen)
  - Sd.Kfz. 234/1 (Schwerer Panzerspähwagen with 20 mm gun)
  - Sd.Kfz. 234/2 (Schwerer Panzerspähwagen with 50 mm gun)
  - Sd.Kfz. 234/3 (Schwerer Panzerspähwagen with 75 mm gun)
  - Sd.Kfz. 234/4 (Schwerer Panzerspähwagen with 7.5 cm Pak 40 gun)
- Sd.Kfz. 247 (armored staff car)
- Sd.Kfz. 250 (armored light halftrack)
  - Sd.Kfz. 250/1 (with communications gear)
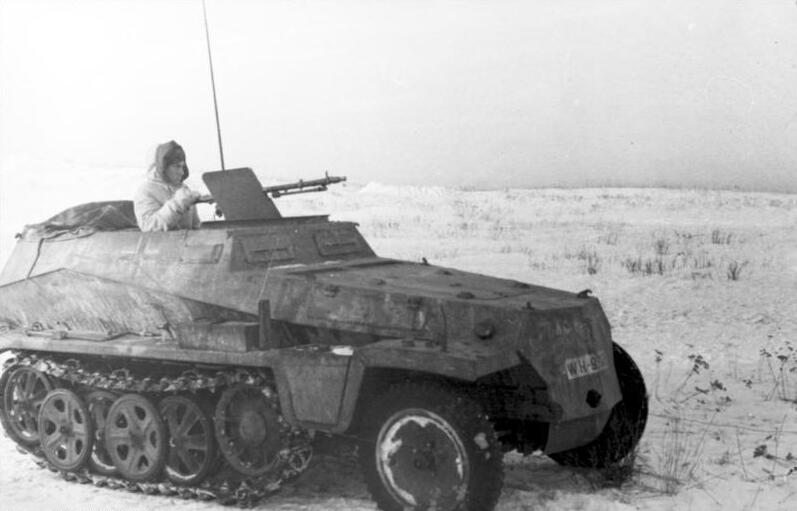
    Sd.Kfz. 250
  - Sd.Kfz. 250/2 leichter Fernsprechpanzerwagen light armored halftrack with cable-laying gear
  - Sd.Kfz. 250/3 (with radio gear)
  - Sd.Kfz. 250/4 ( with twin antiaircraft machineguns)
  - Sd.Kfz. 250/5 leichter Beobachtungspanzerwagen observation post)
  - Sd.Kfz. 250/6 (reconnaissance vehicle)
  - Sd.Kfz. 250/7 leichter Schützenpanzerwagen (schwerer Granatwerfer) (mortar carrier)
  - Sd.Kfz. 250/8 leichter Schützenpanzerwagen (7.5 cm) with 7.5 cm KwK 37 gun
  - Sd.Kfz. 250/9 ( with 20 mm L/55 gun)
  - Sd.Kfz. 250/10 (with 37 mm antitank gun)
  - Sd.Kfz. 250/11 (with 2.8 cm sPzB 41 anti-tank "rifle")
  - Sd.Kfz. 250/12 (for survey crews)
- Sd.Kfz. 251 (medium armored halftrack)
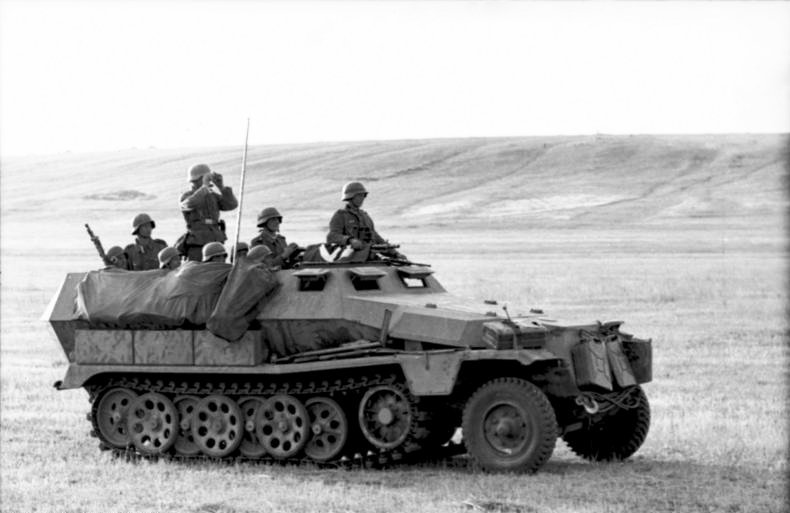
  Sd.Kfz. 251 carrying troops in southern Russia in 1942
  - Sd.Kfz. 251/1 (with communications gear)
  - Sd.Kfz. 251/2 (mortar carrier)
  - Sd.Kfz. 251/3 (with radio gear)
  - Sd.Kfz. 251/4 Schützenpanzerwagen für Munition und Zubehör des leIG18 - artillery tractor
  - Sd.Kfz. 251/5 (medium armored halftrack for engineers)
  - Sd.Kfz. 251/6 (medium armored halftrack command post)
  - Sd.Kfz. 251/7 (medium armored halftrack for engineers)
  - Sd.Kfz. 251/8 (medium armored halftrack ambulance)
  - Sd.Kfz. 251/9 (medium armored halftrack with 75 mm L/24 gun)
  - Sd.Kfz. 251/10 (medium armored halftrack with 37 mm antitank gun)
  - Sd.Kfz. 251/11 (medium armored halftrack with telephone equipment)
  - Sd.Kfz. 251/12 (medium armored halftrack with survey gear)
  - Sd.Kfz. 251/13 (medium armored halftrack with artillery sound recording gear)
  - Sd.Kfz. 251/14 (medium armored halftrack with artillery sound ranging gear)
  - Sd.Kfz. 251/15 (medium armored halftrack with artillery flash spotting gear)
  - Sd.Kfz. 251/16 (medium armored halftrack with flamethrower)
  - Sd.Kfz. 251/17 (medium armored halftrack with 20 mm L/55 gun)
  - Sd.Kfz. 251/18 (medium armored halftrack observation post)
  - Sd.Kfz. 251/19 (medium armored halftrack with telephone exchange gear)
  - Sd.Kfz. 251/20 (medium armored halftrack with infrared searchlight)
  - Sd.Kfz. 251/21 Schützenpanzerwagen (Drilling MG151s). with triple 15mm or 20mm MG151 autocannon)
  - Sd.Kfz. 251/22 (with 75 mm L/46 Pak-40 gun)
  - Sd.Kfz. 251/23 (reconnaissance vehicle - possibly never produced. Was to have a 20mm gun in turret similar to Sd.Kfz. 234/1)
- Sd.Kfz. 252 (light halftrack ammunition carrier)
- Sd.Kfz. 253 leichter Gepanzerter Beobachtungskraftwagen (artillery observation post)
- Sd.Kfz. 254 (medium track or wheel observation post)
- Sd.Kfz. 260 (light armored radio car)
- Sd.Kfz. 261 Kleiner Panzerfunkwagen equipped with radios for army communication
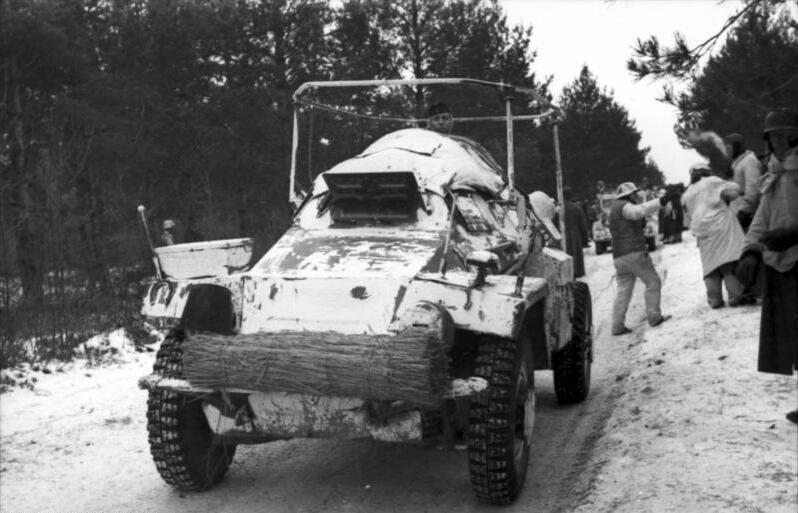
  The Sd.Kfz. 261 had a large frame aerial over the vehicle
- Sd.Kfz. 263 6-rad (heavy armored radio car - 6 wheel)
- Sd.Kfz. 263 8-rad (heavy armored radio car - 8 wheel)
- Sd.Kfz. 265 (Panzerbefehlswagen Panzer I command tank)
- Sd.Kfz. 266 (Panzer III command tanks with FuG 6 and FuG 2 radios)
- Sd.Kfz. 267 (Panzer III, Panther tank, and Tiger I command tanks with FuG 6 and FuG 8 radios)
- Sd.Kfz. 268 (Panzer III, Panther, and Tiger I command tanks with FuG 6 and FuG 7 radios)
- Sd.Kfz. 280 gepanzerter Munitionsschlepper (armored ammunition tractor, also known as Sonderschlepper III)

=== Sd.Kfz. 300 and above ===
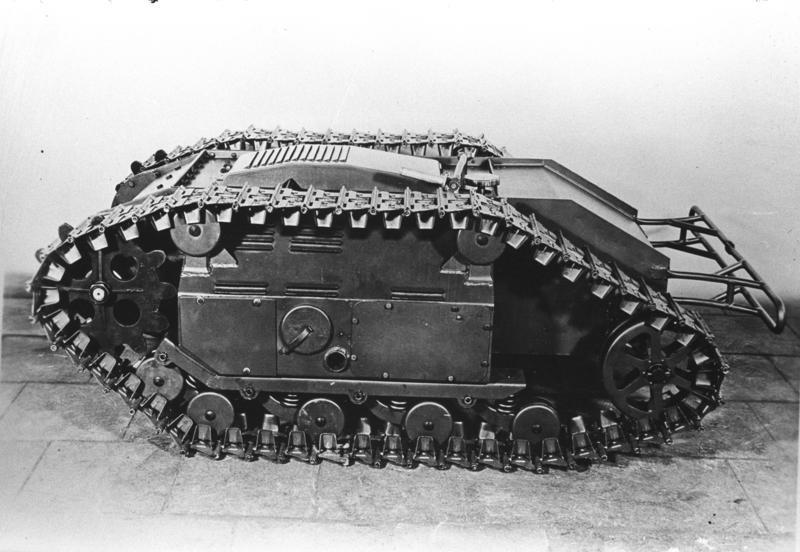
Sd.Kfz. 303 version of the Goliath used a petrol engine as a cost-saving measure

- Sd.Kfz. 300 - Minenräumwagen (Borgward I and Borgward II) remote-controlled mine destroyer
- Sd.Kfz. 301 - Borgward IV heavy remote-control demolition layer
- Sd.Kfz. 302 - Goliath tracked mine (Leichter Ladungsträger Goliath) light remote-control demolition vehicle with electric motor
- Sd.Kfz. 303 - Goliath tracked mine light remote-control demolition vehicle with petrol engine
- Sd.Kfz. 304 - Springer medium remote-control demolition vehicle
- Sd.Kfz. 311 - Sprengstoffträger (explosive carrier)
- Sd.Kfz. 325 - Vergleichsfahrzeug (heavy-duty off-road tractor)
- Sd.Kfz. 360 - Kraftzugwagen (towing vehicle)
- Sd.Kfz. 400 - Panzerberge-Kraftwagenzug (tank recovery-vehicle train)

== See also ==
- List of World War II military vehicles of Germany
- List of FV series military vehicles
- List of the United States military vehicles by model number
