= Józef Kempa =

Polish actor

- Born: 14 March 1905; Warsaw, Poland
- Died: 13 August 1944 (aged 39); Warsaw, German-occupied Poland
- Occupation: Actor
- Years active: 1918–1944

Józef Kempa (14 March 1905 – 13 August 1944) was a Polish actor. He was active in theatre and film between 1918 and 1944. He was a civilian fatality of the Warsaw Uprising, dying in the explosion of a German Borgward IV demolition vehicle on 13 August 1944.

== Select filmography ==
- Róża (1936)
- Plomienne serca (1937)
- Sygnały (1938)
