= Springer (vehicle) =

German ww2 demolition vehicle

Springer (Mittlerer Ladungsträger Springer, Sd.Kfz. 304)
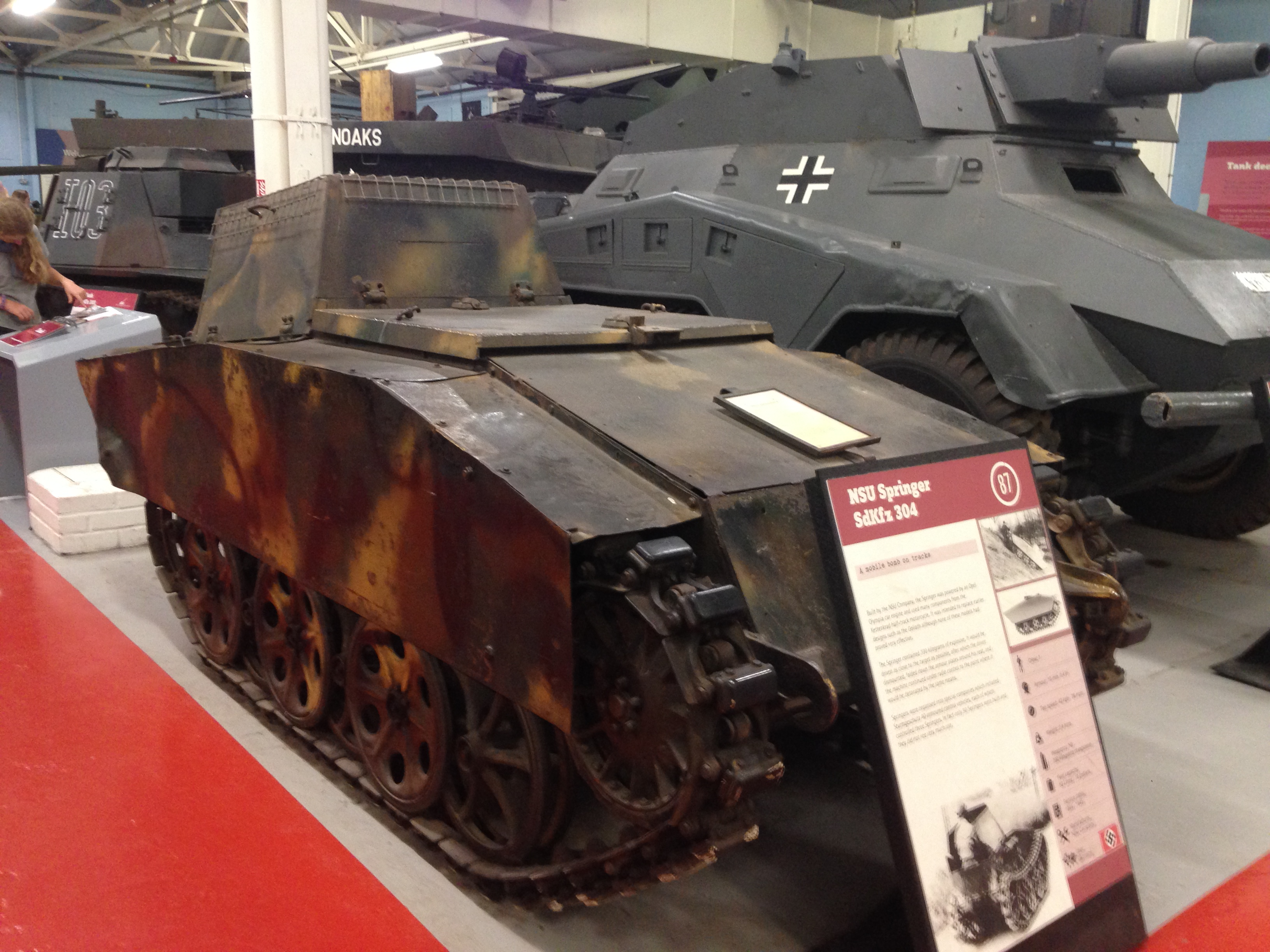
- Springer at The Tank Museum, Bovington
- Type: Demolition vehicle
- Place of origin: Nazi Germany

Service history
- In service: 1944–1945

Production history
- Manufacturer: NSU
- No. built: 50

Specifications
- Mass: 2.4 ton
- Length: 3.17 m (10 ft 5 in)
- Width: 1.43 m (4 ft 8 in)
- Height: 1.45 m (4 ft 9 in)
- Armor: 10mm maximum
- Main armament: 330 kg (730 lb) explosive
- Engine: 1.5L Opel Olympia
- Suspension: torsion bar
- Guidance system: wireless, up to 2 km

The Mittlerer Ladungsträger Springer (Sd.Kfz. 304) was a demolition vehicle of the German Wehrmacht in World War II.

== Description ==
Based on the NSU Sd.Kfz. 2 Kettenkrad light tracked vehicle, NSU Werke at Neckarsulm developed and built around 50 Springer demolition vehicles from October 1944 to April 1945.

To make the vehicle capable of carrying a bigger payload without the motorcycle-style front fork of the original, two pairs of overlapping and interleaved road wheels were added to the aft end of the running gear on each side; giving three outer and three inner running wheels. It was powered by the same Opel Olympia engine of the Kettenkrad.

A driver, sitting in the back of the Springer, drove the vehicle close to the target before dismounting. The final approach and the detonation of the 330 kg (730 lb) high explosive charge was controlled by a wired or wireless remote control device.

Springers were operated by "Radio Control Armoured Companies", a company made up of three Sturmgeschütz 40 armoured control vehicles, each controlling three Springers and a Sturmgeschütz command vehicle.

The Springer showed the same problems as other remote-controlled demolition vehicles: They were expensive and not very reliable. As the explosive charge was an integral part of the vehicle, it could only be used once.

== Survivors ==
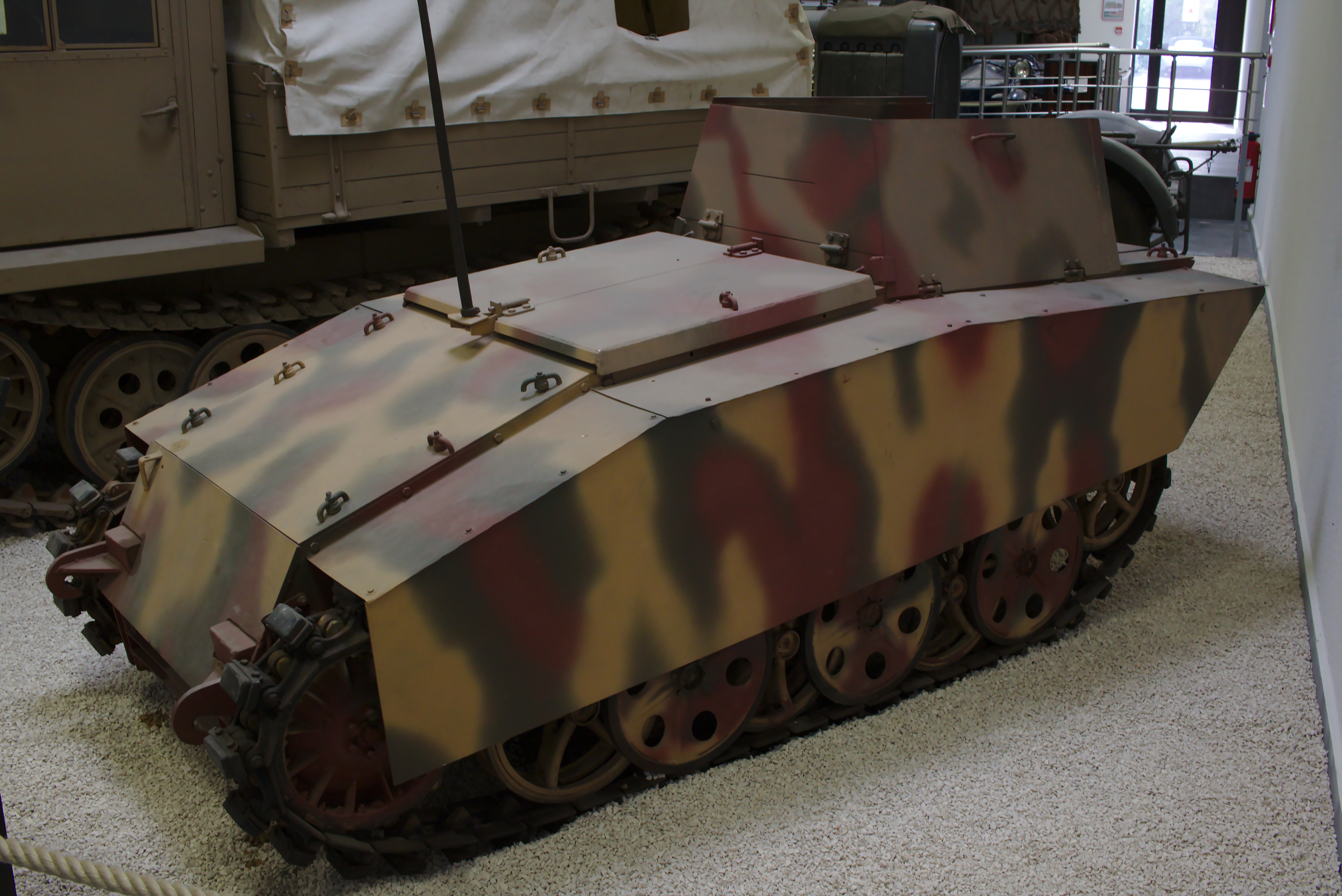
Sd.Kfz. 304 at the MM Park

An NSU Springer is displayed at The Tank Museum, UK. Another example is preserved at the MM Park near Strasbourg, in France.

== See also ==
- Goliath tracked mine – (Nazi Germany)
- Borgward IV – (Nazi Germany)
- Mobile Land Mine – (United Kingdom)
- Teletank – (Soviet Union)
