= Sd.Kfz. 254 =

- Type: Tracked/wheeled armoured scout car
- Place of origin: Federal State of Austria

Service history
- Used by: Austria, Nazi Germany

Production history
- No. built: 140
- Variants: artillery observation vehicle

Specifications
- Mass: 6.4 tonnes
- Length: 4.56 m
- Width: 2.02 m, 2.20 m on wheels
- Height: 1.88 m
- Crew: 7
- Armor: 6 - 15 mm
- Main armament: 1 x MG34 7.92 mm machine gun
- Engine: Saurer CRDv 4cyl, diesel 70 PS
- Operational range: 500 km on wheels
- Maximum speed: 60 km/h

The Sd.Kfz. 254 was a German fully tracked armoured scout car employed by Wehrmacht during World War II.

From 1936, the vehicle was developed under the designation RR-7 by the Saurer company as an artillery tractor for the Austrian army. Testing was completed and in 1937, an order was placed for the tractors and they were manufactured in 1938. About 12 vehicles were made prior to Anschluss (the annexation of Austria by Nazi Germany in 1938).

Manufacture of the vehicle continued after the Anschluss. Records indicate that a total of 140 units were built with the new designation RK-7 (Räder-Kettenfahrgestell), although they were named as Sd.Kfz. 254 by the Wehrmacht. The vehicle featured a wheel-track layout and a diesel motor. The wheels were lowered when it was used on roads and retracted for tracked movement cross-country. A number saw service with the Afrika Korps, serving as artillery observation vehicles after being fitted with a radio and rail antenna.

== The freedom tank ==
In 1950 the former mechanic Václav Uhlík from Líně in the Czech Republic found the wreck of an RR-7 artillery tractor. He repaired and rebuilt the machine as an armoured carrier. On 25 July 1953, with seven passengers in the vehicle, he got through three border zones including wire obstacles, and penetrated thirty kilometres into West German territory. There he applied for asylum and emigrated to the United States, where the machine was exhibited as the "freedom tank" (Czech: tank svobody). It is now owned by a private collector.

== Sources ==
- Chamberlain, Peter; Doyle, Hilary (2004). Encyclopedia of German Tanks of World War Two. Technical Editor: Thomas L. Jentz. Wigston, Leicestershire, UK: Silverdale Books. ISBN 1-84509-012-8.
