= Kfz 13 =

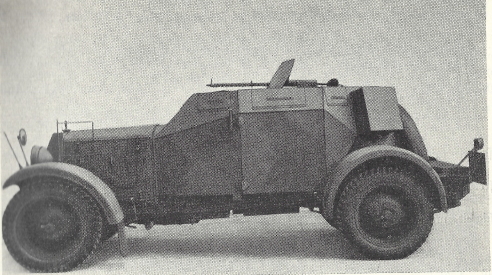
- Type: Armoured car
- Place of origin: Germany

Service history
- In service: 1933–1941
- Used by: Germany
- Wars: World War II

Production history
- Manufacturer: Daimler-Benz
- Produced: 1932–35
- No. built: 187; 147 Kfz 13, 40 Kfz. 14
- Variants: Kfz 14

Specifications
- Mass: 2.1 t (2.1 long tons; 2.3 short tons)
- Length: 4.2 m (14 ft)
- Width: 1.7 m (5 ft 7 in)
- Crew: 2 (Kfz 13); 3 (Kfz 14)
- Armor: 8 mm (0.31 in)
- Main armament: MG 13, later MG 34 with 1,000 rounds of ammunition
- Engine: Adler "Standard 6" water-cooled six cylinder 2,916 cm³ inline engine 51 hp (38 kW)
- Fuel capacity: 70 litres (15 imp gal)
- Operational range: 380 km (240 mi)
- Maximum speed: 70 km/h (43 mph) road

The Kfz. 13 (also Maschinengewehr-Kraftwagen) was the first armoured reconnaissance vehicle introduced by the Reichswehr after the First World War and, by 1935, 147 units of this lightly armoured vehicle had been delivered to the fleet. The Kfz. 13 was based on a civilian car, the Adler Standard 6. Although the Kfz. 13 was equipped with all-wheel drive, the vehicle had poor cross-country capability and the added weight led to overheating. The unarmed version, the Kfz. 14 communications vehicle, was equipped with a radio set instead of the machine gun.

The Kfz. 13 & 14, along with other armored reconnaissance cars, spearheaded the Invasion of Poland, where it was found that their thin armor was readily penetrated by Polish anti-tank weapons. By the time Poland surrendered, 23 cars of both types had been destroyed. The cars next saw action in the Battle of France, where they once again saw losses, but performed a bit better due to the better roads there. The vehicles continued being used in the Balkans and invasion of the Soviet Union. All of the cars sent to the Soviet Union were destroyed by 1941 and all remaining cars were retired from active service that same year, afterwards only being used for training or by second-line troops.

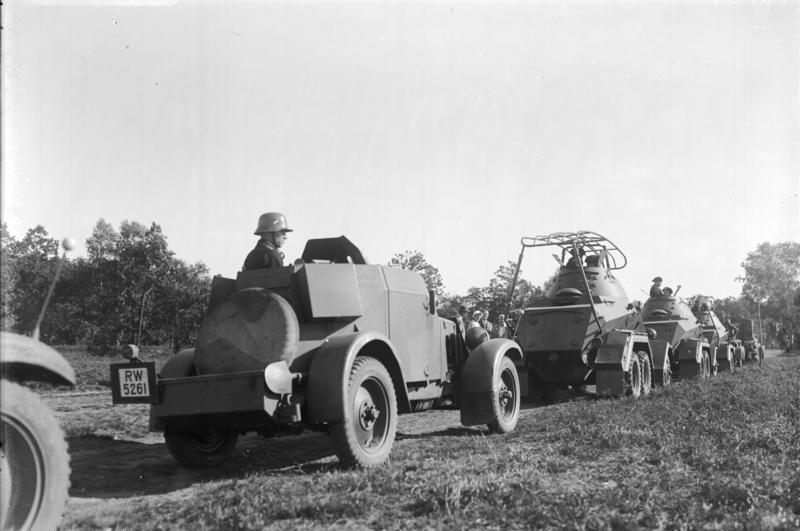
Kfz 13 (left)

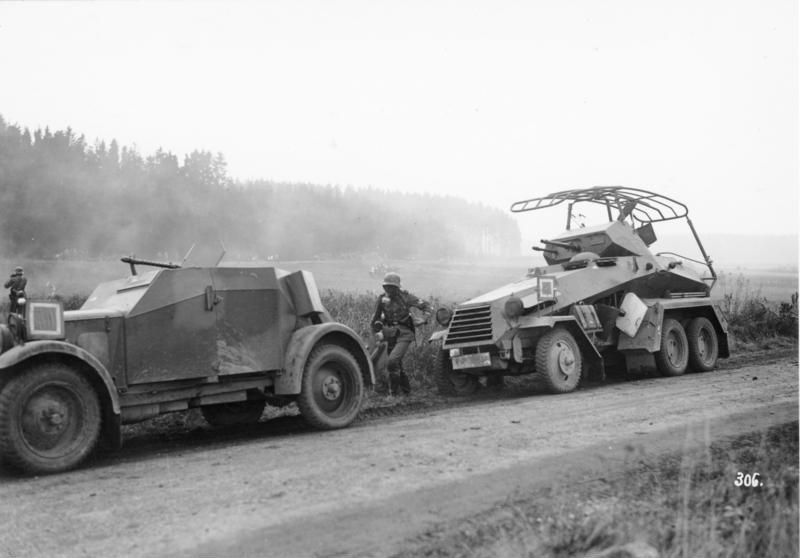
Left: a Kfz 13; right: an armoured Sd.Kfz. 232 with large loop antenna (6-wheeled radio and command vehicle)

== See also ==
- List of German military equipment of World War II
- D-8 Armored Car - Contemporary Soviet design based on Ford Model A.
