= Sd.Kfz. 2 =

German military half track motorcycle

Sd.Kfz.2 Kettenkrad HK 101
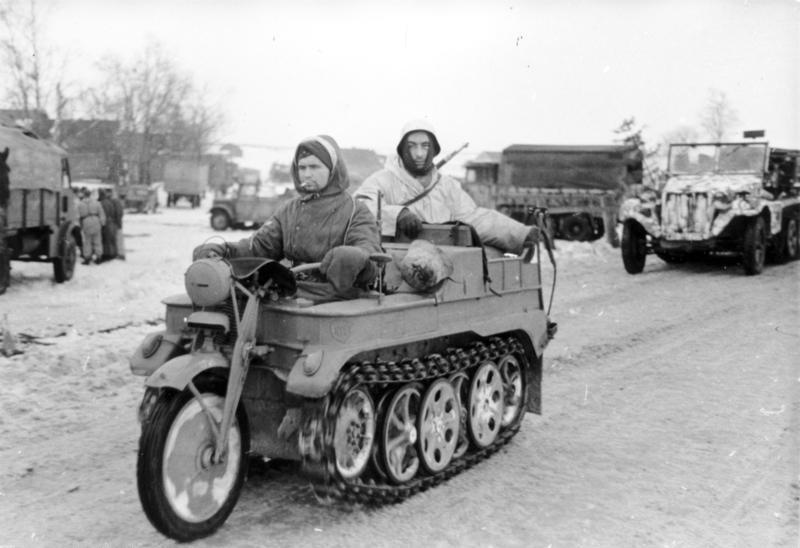
- Kettenkrad in Russia, winter of 1943/1944.
- Type: Light half-tracked gun tractor
- Place of origin: Nazi Germany

Service history
- In service: 1941–1945
- Used by: Nazi Germany
- Wars: World War II

Production history
- Designer: NSU
- Designed: 1939
- Manufacturer: NSU Motorenwerke
- Produced: 1940–1948

Specifications
- Mass: 1,560 kg (3,440 lb)
- Length: 3 m (9 ft 10 in)
- Width: 1 m (3 ft 3 in)
- Height: 1.2 m (3 ft 11 in)
- Crew: 1 driver
- Passengers: 2 passengers
- Engine: Opel 1.5L watercooled I4; 36 bhp (27 kW)
- Transmission: 3 forward/1 reverse × 2 range
- Maximum speed: 70 km/h (43 mph)

The Sd.Kfz.2 (German: Sonderkraftfahrzeug 2) is a half-track motorcycle with a single front wheel, better known as the Kleines Kettenkraftrad HK 101 (from German klein 'small', Ketten 'chains/tracks' and Kraftrad 'motorcycle'), shortened to Kettenkrad (pl. Kettenkräder). It was used by the military of Nazi Germany during the Second World War.

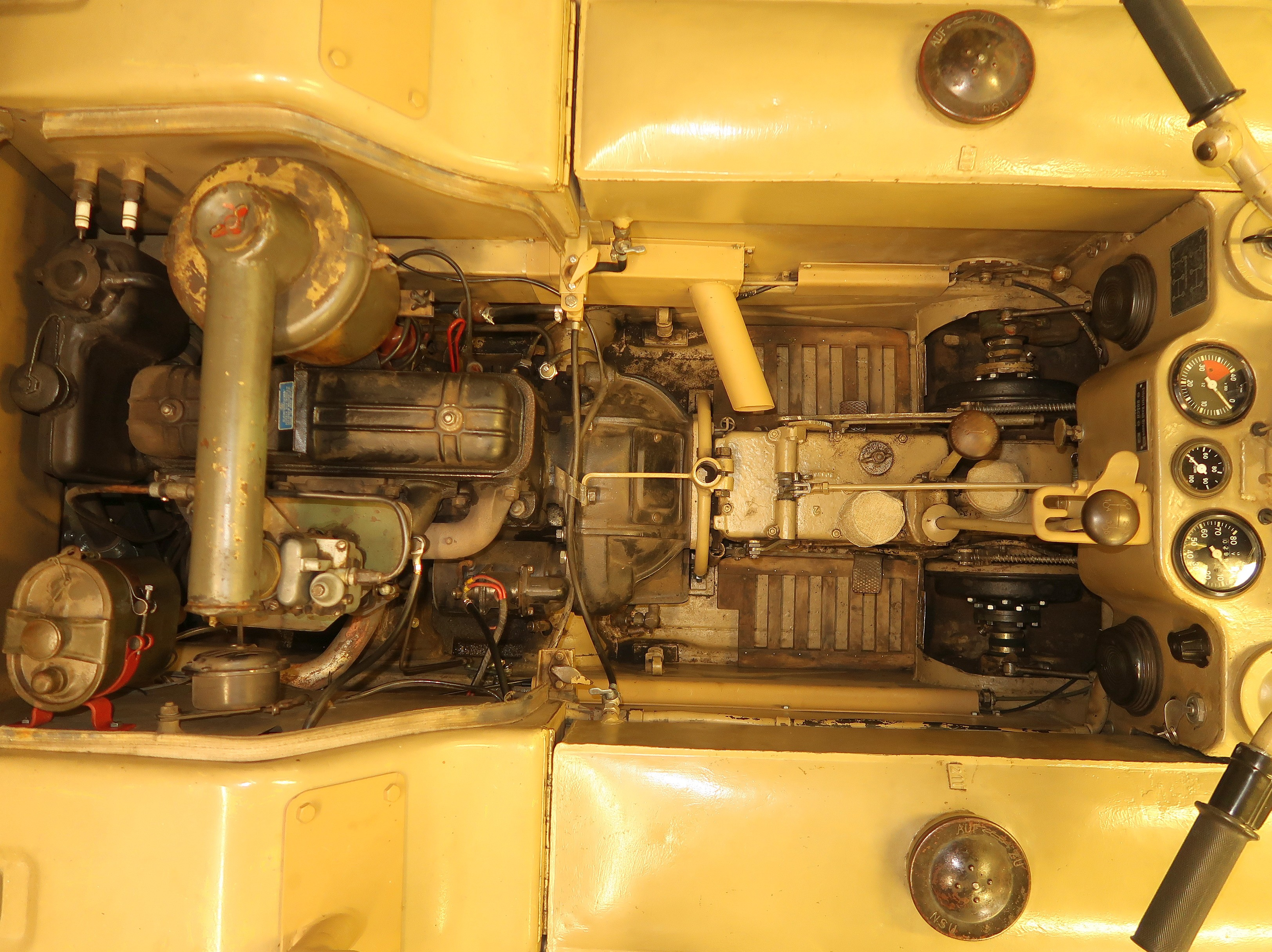
View from above on the drivetrain of a 1942 NSU Kettenkrad. Driver's seat removed.

== Design ==
The Kettenkrad was first designed as a light tractor for airborne troops. The vehicle was designed to be delivered by Junkers Ju 52 aircraft, though not by parachute. The vehicle had the advantage of being the only gun tractor small enough to fit inside the hold of the Ju 52, and was the lightest mass-produced German military vehicle to use the complex Schachtellaufwerk overlapped and interleaved road wheels used on almost all German military half-tracked vehicles of World War II.

Steering the Kettenkrad was accomplished by turning the handlebars: Up to a certain point, only the front wheel would steer the vehicle. A motion of the handlebars beyond that point would engage the track brakes to help make turns sharper. It was also possible to run the vehicle without the front wheel installed and this was recommended in extreme off-road conditions where speed would be kept low.

The Sd.Kfz.2 was designed and built by the NSU Werke AG at Neckarsulm, Germany. Patented in June 1939, it was first used in the Invasion of Crete in 1941. Later in the war Stoewer from Stettin also produced Kettenkrads under license, accounting for about 15% of the total production.

The Kettenkrad came with a special trailer Sonderanhänger 1 (Sd.Ah.1) that could be attached to it to improve its cargo capacity. The trailer had a payload of 350 kg (770 lb).

Being a tracked vehicle, the Kettenkrad could climb up to 24° in sand and even more on hard ground.

== Service ==
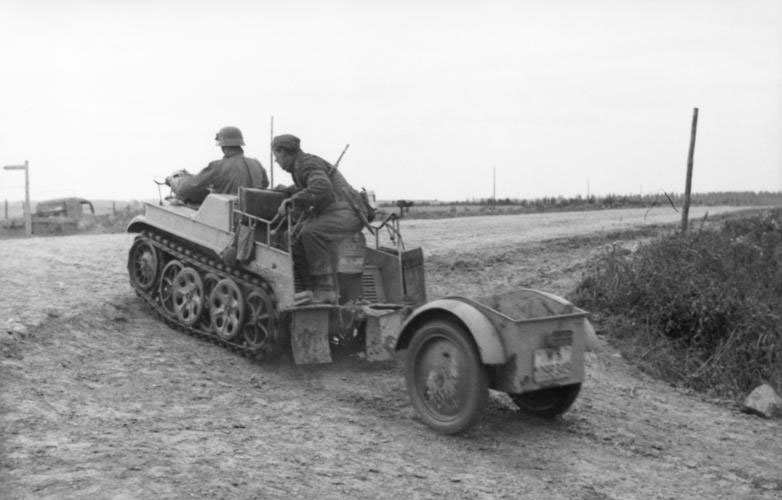
Kettenkrad with Sd.Anh.1 trailer, Russia 1943

Most Kettenkräder saw service on the Eastern Front, where they were used to lay communication cables, pull heavy loads and carry soldiers through the deep Russian mud. Later in the war, Kettenkräder were used as runway tugs for aircraft, especially for the Messerschmitt Me 262 jet fighter, and sometimes the Arado Ar 234 jet reconnaissance-bomber. In order to save aviation fuel, German jet aircraft were towed to the runway, rather than taxiing under their own power.

The vehicle was also used in the North African theater and on the Western Front.

== Variants ==
Only two significant sub-variations of the Kettenkrad were constructed. The mittlerer Ladungsträger Springer (Sd.Kfz. 304) was a remotely controlled demolition vehicle. Also an enlarged five-seat version of the Kettenkrad was developed but only prototypes were built.

Production of the Kettenkrad was stopped in 1944, at which time 8,345 had been built. After the war, production resumed at NSU. Around 550 Kettenkräder were built for agricultural use, with production ending in 1948 or 1949 (sources vary).

== See also ==
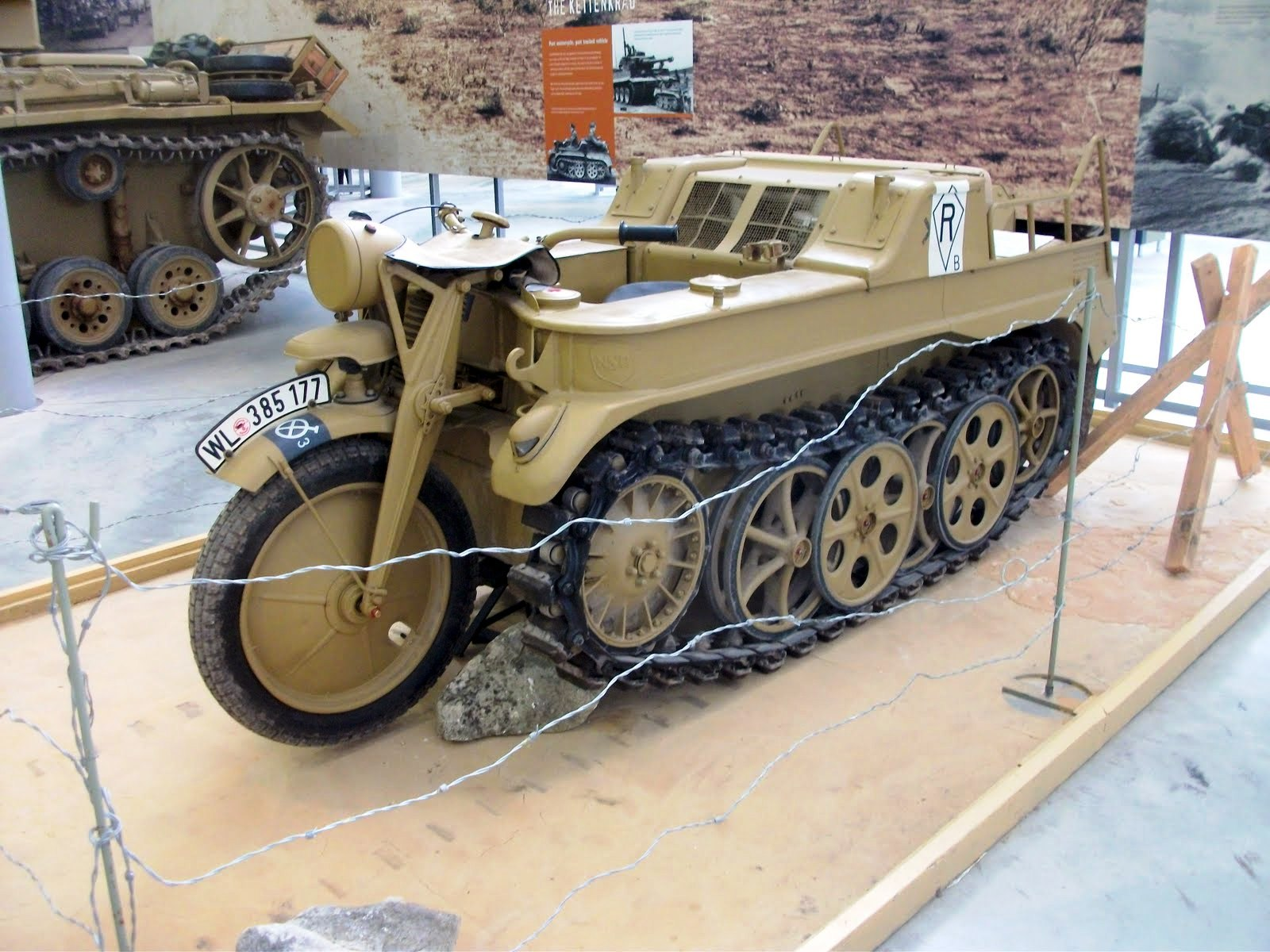
Kettenkrad at The Tank Museum, Bovington

- Springer (vehicle) (Sd.Kfz. 304), a one-use military demolition vehicle based on the Kettenkrad's powertrain.
- List of Sd.Kfz. designations
