= Flakpanzer Coelian =

Flakpanzer 341
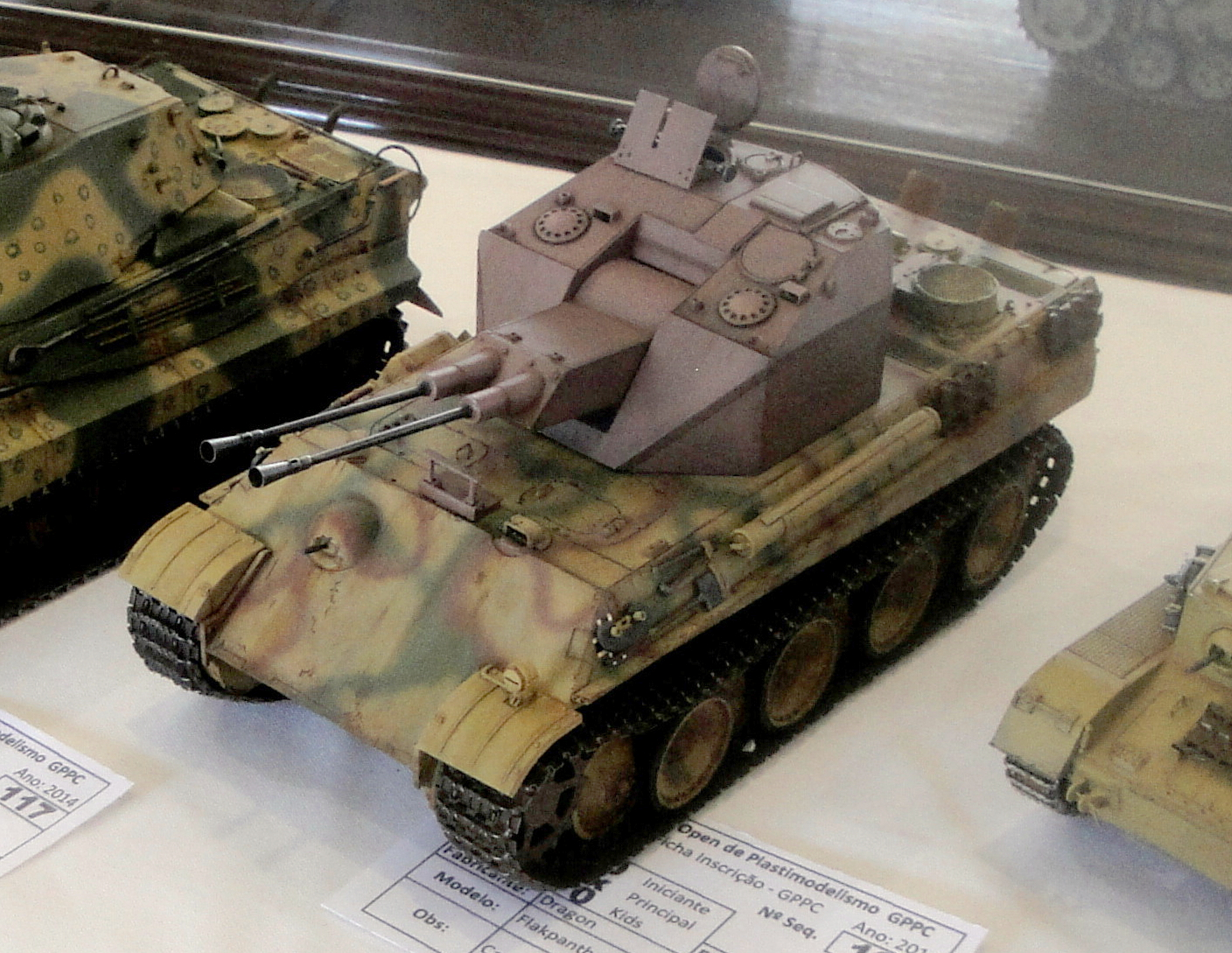
- Scale model of a Flakpanzer 341
- Type: Self-propelled anti-aircraft gun
- Place of origin: Nazi Germany

Production history
- Designer: Alkett
- Designed: 1944

Specifications
- Mass: around 40 tonnes (39 long tons; 44 short tons)
- Length: 6.87 m (22 ft 6 in)
- Width: 3.27 m (10 ft 9 in)
- Height: 2.8 m (9 ft 2 in)
- Crew: 4-5
- Armor: 80 mm (3.1 in) maximum
- Main armament: 2 × 3.7 cm Flak 341 with 1500 rounds
- Secondary armament: 1 × 7.92 mm MG 34 machine gun
- Engine: V-12 petrol Maybach HL230 P30; 700 PS (690 hp, 515 kW)
- Transmission: ZF AK 7-200. 7 forward 1 reverse
- Suspension: double torsion bar, interleaved road wheels
- Fuel capacity: 720 litres (160 imp gal; 190 US gal)

The 3.7 cm Flakzwilling auf Panther Fahrgestell or Flakpanzer 341 was a German self-propelled anti-aircraft gun designed by Rheinmetall during World War II. It was intended to be armed with two 3.7 cm Flak 341 guns in a fully enclosed, rotating turret on the hull of a Panther medium tank. In the end, only a wooden mock-up of the turret on a Panther chassis was built.

== Development ==
In the first years of the war, the Wehrmacht had less interest in developing self-propelled anti-aircraft guns, but as the Allies achieved air superiority, the need for more mobile and better-armed self-propelled anti-aircraft guns increased. The Wehrmacht had adapted a variety of wheeled and half-track vehicles to serve as mobile forward air defence positions to protect armour and infantry units in the field as well as for temporary forward area positions such as mobile headquarters and logistic points. As Allied fighter bombers and other ground attack aircraft moved from machine gun armament and bombing to air-to-ground rockets, the air defence positions were even more vulnerable. The answer was to create tank-based Flakpanzers with armour that would protect the gun crews while they fired upon approaching Allied aircraft.

Rheinmetall had developed a design for a Panther armed with four 2 cm MG 151/20 guns in May 1943. However, the 2 cm guns were considered too weak already, and in December 1943 a tank committee decided that all future self-propelled anti-aircraft guns based on the Panther would be armed with two 3.7 cm guns, and later two 5.5 cm guns. Both Daimler-Benz and Rheinmetall were chosen to design a turret armed with twin 3.7 cm guns for the Panther, with the latter finishing their design in May 1944. A wooden mock-up of the turret was created and mounted on the chassis of a Panther Ausf. D.

However, it soon became clear that no chassis would be available for Flakpanzers for a variety of reasons, including the Allies landing in Normandy, the increasing Allied strategic bombing offensive, and raw material shortages. Work on the Flakpanzer 341 continued throughout 1944, but in January 1945 all work on a 3.7 cm armed Flakpanzer on the Panther chassis was stopped due to the 3.7 cm guns being considered inadequate.
