= Mobile Land Mine =

British WW2-era experimental explosive device

The Mobile Land Mine (originally named "Beetle") was an experimental British World War II remote-controlled tracked explosive device. It was wire guided and powered by two electric motors.

== History ==
The Mobile Land Mine was designed by Metropolitan-Vickers in 1940.

After a successful demonstration in August 1941 an order for 50 was placed so that trials could be carried out. In 1942 Commander-in-Chief, Home Forces reported that it was not recommended as there was no requirement for it. It was underpowered, slow, the motors overheated and it couldn't cross typical battlefield terrain. It was rejected by the General Staff in 1944.

Among other trials a Mobile Land Mine was waterproofed and equipped with floats allowing it to be used against landing craft.

== See also ==
- Goliath tracked mine, the approximate German equivalent
