= Goliath tracked mine =

German WWII remote-controlled demolition vehicle

Goliath Sd.Kfz. 302
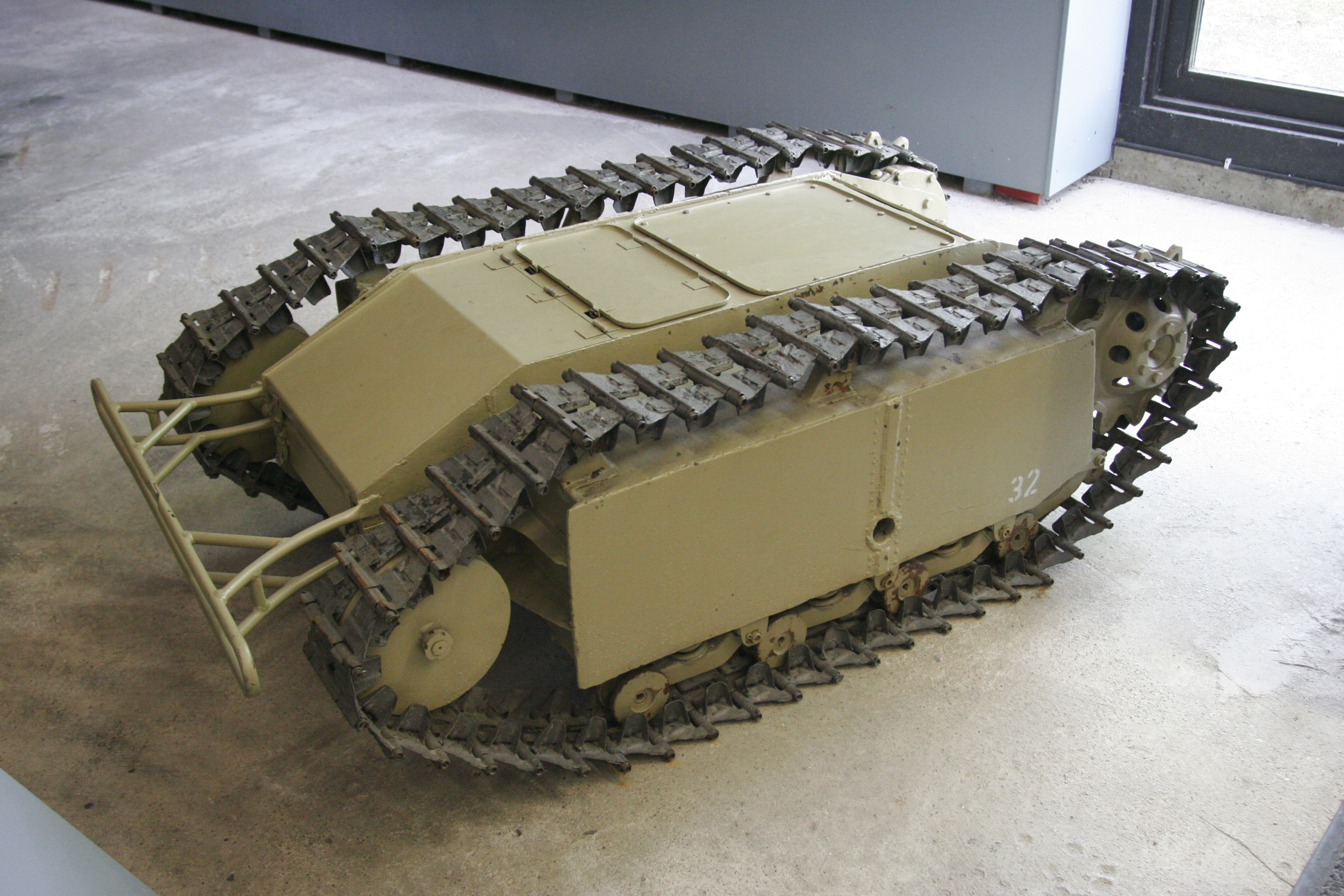
- A Sd.Kfz. 302, displayed at the Deutsches Panzermuseum, Munster (2005)
- Type: Demolition vehicle
- Place of origin: Nazi Germany

Service history
- In service: 1942–1945
- Used by: Nazi Germany; Romania
- Wars: World War II

Production history
- Designed: 1942
- Manufacturer: Borgward and Zündapp
- Unit cost: 3,000 ℛℳ (1942) (€12,577 in 2021)
- Produced: 1942–1944
- No. built: 7,564

Specifications
- Mass: 370 kg (820 lb)
- Length: 1.5 m (4.9 ft)
- Width: 0.85 m (2.8 ft)
- Height: 0.56 m (1.8 ft)
- Crew: One remote operator
- Armor: 5 mm (0.20 in)
- Main armament: 60 kg (130 lb) explosive charge
- Engine: Two Electric Motors; 2 x 2.5 hp (1.9 kW)
- Ground clearance: 11.4 cm (4.5 in)
- Operational range: 1.5 km (0.93 mi) on-road; 0.75 km (0.47 mi) off-road.
- Maximum speed: 6 km/h (3.7 mph)

The Goliath tracked mine (German: Leichter Ladungsträger Goliath, "Goliath Light Charge Carrier") was an unmanned ground vehicle used by the German Army during World War II. They were designed as single-use vehicles with a warhead that could destroy tanks, disrupt dense infantry formations, demolish buildings or bridges, and so forth.

Known as "beetle tanks" by the Allies, they came in two basic variants: the electrically powered Sd.Kfz. 302 and the petrol-engine powered Sd.Kfz. 303a and 303b. They carried 60 or 100 kg (130 or 220 lb) of high explosives, depending on the model.

== Development ==
During and after World War I, a number of inventors devised small, remote-controlled, tracked vehicles intended to carry an explosive charge. During the war, the French developed two vehicles. The Crocodile Schneider Torpille Terrestre (transl. 'Land Torpedo Crocodile Schneider') carried a 40 kg (88 lb) explosive charge and saw limited combat use in June 1916. However, it performed poorly and was eclipsed by the first tanks, then being introduced. The Aubriot-Gabet Torpille Électrique (transl. 'Aubriot-Gabet Electric Torpedo') was driven by a single electric motor powered by a trailing cable. This vehicle may have been steered by clutch control on its tracks, although early versions may have lacked steering. This may not have mattered as its task was simply to cross no man's land to attack the long trenches of the enemy. The Wickersham Land Torpedo was patented by American inventor Elmer Wickersham in 1918 and in the 1930s, a similar vehicle was developed by the French vehicle designer Adolphe Kégresse.

In late 1940, Kégresse's prototype was recovered by the Germans near the Seine; the Wehrmacht's ordnance office directed the Carl F.W. Borgward automotive company of Bremen, Germany to develop a similar vehicle for the purpose of carrying a minimum of 50 kg (110 lb) of explosives. The result was the SdKfz. 302 (Sonderkraftfahrzeug, transl. 'special-purpose vehicle'), called the Leichter Ladungsträger (transl. 'light charge carrier'), or Goliath, which carried 60 kg (130 lb) of explosives. The vehicle was steered remotely via a joystick control box. The control box was connected to the Goliath by a 650-metre (2,130 ft), triple-strand cable. The cable was stored on a cable drum in the rear compartment of the Goliath. The cable was used for steering the vehicle left/right, forwards and reverse (reverse on the electric driven 302 version only) and to ignite the explosive charge. Each Goliath was disposable, being intended to be blown up with its target. Early model Goliaths used two electric motors but, as these were costly to make (3,000 Reichsmarks) and difficult to maintain and recharge in a combat environment, later models (known as the SdKfz. 303) used a cheaper two-stroke petrol engine.

== Service ==
Goliath Sd.Kfz. 303
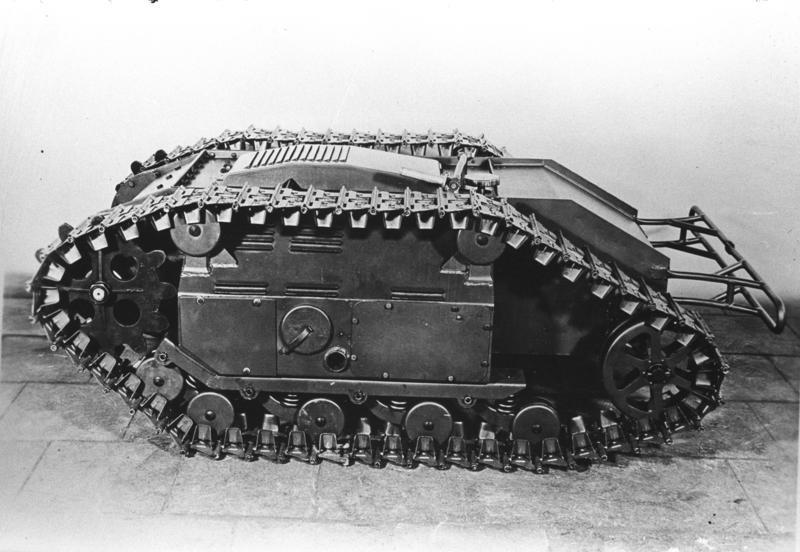
- An Sd.Kfz. 303, the petrol powered version of the Goliath
- Type: Demolition vehicle
- Place of origin: Germany

Service history
- In service: 1943–1945
- Used by: Nazi Germany

Production history
- Designed: 1942
- Manufacturer: Zündapp and Zachertz
- Produced: 1943–1945
- No. built: 4,929, both the model a and model b

Specifications
- Mass: 430 kg (950 lb)
- Length: 1.69 m (5.5 ft)
- Width: 0.91 m (3.0 ft)
- Height: 0.62 m (2.0 ft)
- Crew: One controller with remote.
- Armor: 10 mm (0.39 in)
- Main armament: 100 kg (220 lb) explosive charge
- Engine: Zündapp SZ7 / 2-cylinder 12.5 hp (9.3 kW)
- Operational range: 12 km (7.5 mi) on-road; 7 km (4.3 mi) off-road.

Goliaths were used on all fronts where the Wehrmacht fought, beginning in early 1942. They were used principally by specialized Panzer and combat engineer units. Goliaths were used in Italy at Anzio in April 1944, and against the Polish resistance during the Warsaw Uprising in 1944. A few Goliaths were also seen on the beaches of Normandy during D-Day, though most were rendered inoperative after artillery blasts severed their command cables. Allied troops encountered a small number of Goliaths in the Maritime Alps following the landings in southern France in August 1944, with at least one being used successfully against a vehicle of the 509th Parachute Infantry Battalion.

Although a total of 7,564 Goliaths were produced, the single-use weapon was not considered a success due to high unit cost, low speed (just above 6 kilometres per hour (3.7 mph)), poor ground clearance (just 11.4 cm (4.5 in)), the vulnerable control cable, and thin armour which could not protect the vehicle from small-arms fire. The Goliath was also too big and heavy to be easily man-portable. They mostly failed to reach their targets, although the effect was considerable when they did.

Large numbers of Goliaths were captured by the Allies. Although they were examined with interest by Allied intelligence, they were seen as having little military value. Some were used by the United States Army Air Force as aircraft tugs, although they quickly broke down as the disposable vehicles were not designed for sustained use.

== Romanian version ==
In the years leading up to the Second World War, Romania designed and built its own model of remote-controlled tracked mine, commonly known as "Romanian Goliath", but officially designated "Torpila terestră dirijată Eremia" ("Eremia guided land torpedo"). It was markedly different from its later German counterpart. The few surviving photos show that the vehicle, unlike the German Goliath, had no armour at all, and it is not known if that was ever changed. The Romanian-designed chassis allowed it to cross trenches and craters much better than its German counterpart. Little more is known about the vehicle, other than that it never went beyond the prototype stage and that it weighed about two tonnes.

== Surviving examples ==
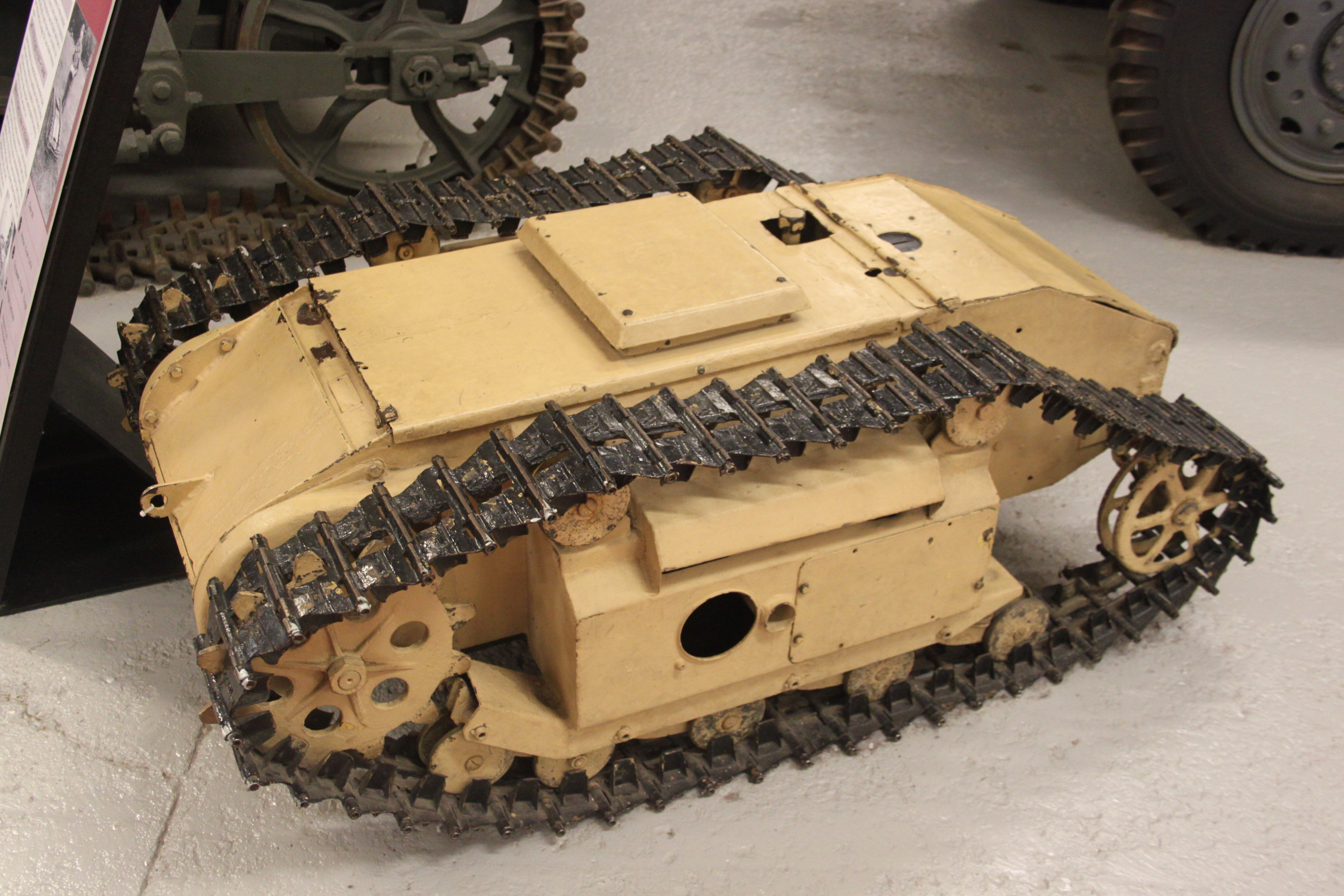
A Goliath 303 displayed at the Bovington Tank Museum

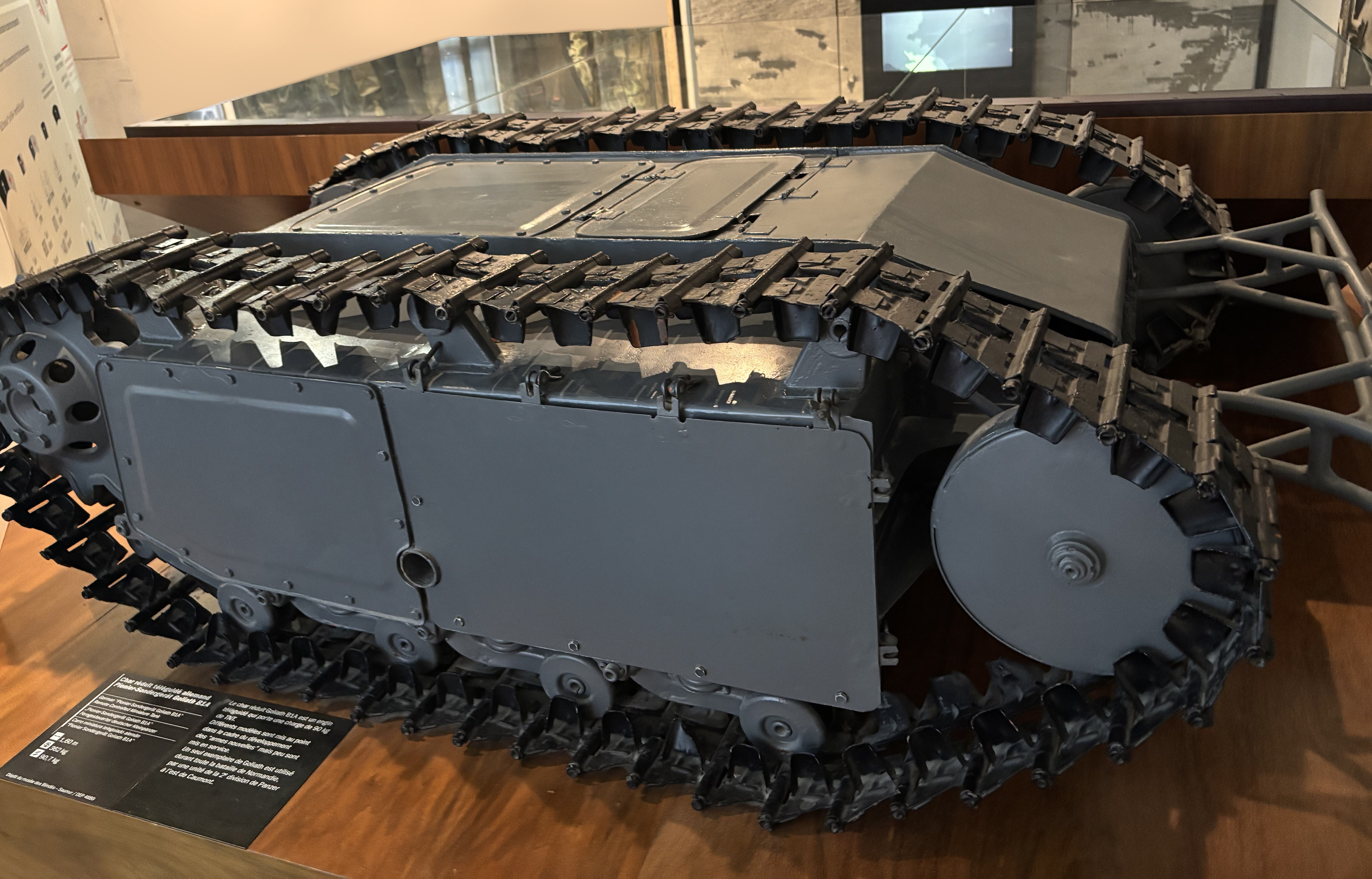
Goliath B1A from Musée des Blindés

Surviving Goliaths are preserved at:

- The Museum Stammheim, Germany
- The Deutsches Panzermuseum, Germany
- The Bundeswehr Military History Museum, Dresden, Germany
- The Technik Museum Sinsheim, Germany
- Friends' Association of the Scientific Collection of Defence Engineering Specimens Koblenz (VFF WTS), Koblenz, Germany
- The Tøjhus Museum, Copenhagen, Denmark
- Heeresgeschichtliches Museum, Vienna, Austria
- The Musée du Débarquement Utah Beach, Normandy, France
- Musée des Blindés, Saumur, France
- Musee No. 4 Commando, Ouistreham, Normandy, France
- The Canadian War Museum, Ottawa, Ontario, Canada
- Fort Garry Horse Museum, Winnipeg, Manitoba, Canada
- United States Army Ordnance Museum, USA
- Karl Smith collection, USA
- The Museum of World War II Massachusetts, USA (Permanently Closed),
- The Flying Heritage & Combat Armor Museum, Everett, Washington, USA
- The Imperial War Museum, Duxford, UK
- The Tank Museum, Bovington Camp, UK
- The REME Museum, UK
- Dutch Cavalry Museum, Netherlands
- War Museum Overloon, Netherlands
- Het Nederlands kustverdedigingsmuseum: Fort aan den Hoek van Holland
- Het Memory Oorlogs- en Vredesmuseum Nijverdal, Netherlands
- Royal Museum of the Armed Forces and Military History, Belgium
- December 44 Museum, La Gleize, Belgium
- The Kubinka Tank Museum, Russia
- Arsenał in Wrocław, Poland
- Polish Army Museum, Poland
- Warsaw Uprising Museum, Poland
- Muzeum dopravy (transportation museum), Bratislava, Slovakia
- Swedish Army Museum, Stockholm, Sweden
- Australian Armour and Artillery Museum, Smithfield, Queensland, Australia

== See also ==
- Borgward IV
- Mobile Land Mine, equivalent British World War 2 vehicle; fifty built.
- Springer (tank)
- Teletank, a series of Soviet remote controlled tanks
- Unmanned ground vehicle
- 97-Shiki Sho-Sagyoki
