= Borgward IV =

German WW2 remote controlled demolition vehicle

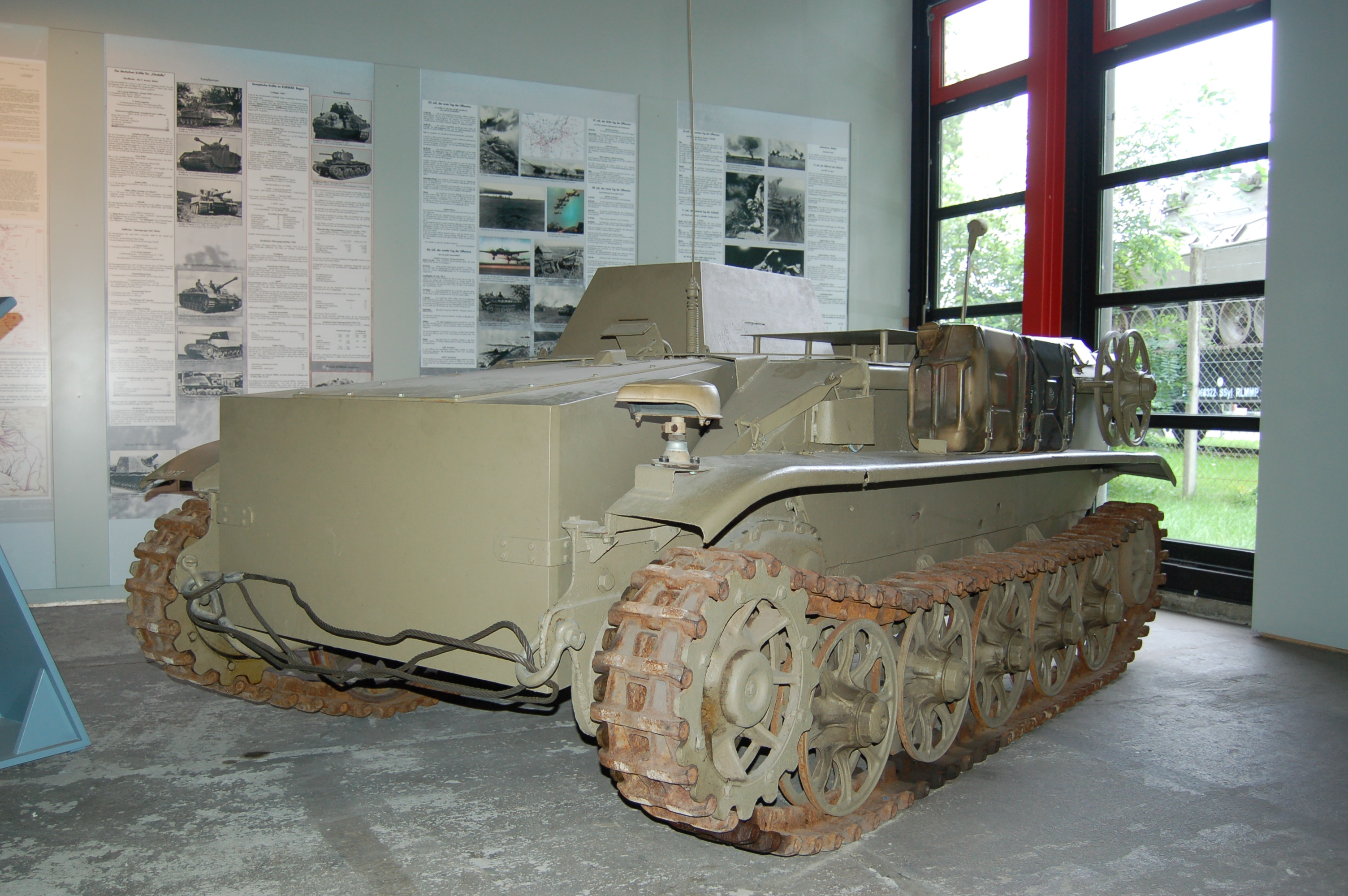
- Borgward IV at the German Tank Museum in Munster, Germany, with releasable ordnance container in place
- Type: Demolition vehicle
- Place of origin: Nazi Germany

Service history
- In service: 1942-1945
- Wars: World War II

Specifications
- Mass: 3.45 tonnes (3.40 long tons; 3.80 short tons)
- Length: 3.35 m (11 ft)
- Width: 1.80 m (5 ft 11 in)
- Height: 1.25 m (4 ft 1 in)
- Crew: 1
- Armour: up to 20 mm (0.79 in)
- Main armament: 450 kg (990 lb) explosive charge
- Engine: Borgward water-cooled 6-cylinder gasoline engine 49 PS
- Power/weight: 14.2 PS/tonne
- Transmission: 1 forward, 1 reverse ratio
- Suspension: torsion bar
- Fuel capacity: 108 L (28.5 US gal)
- Operational range: 120 km (75 mi)
- Maximum speed: 40 km/h (25 mph) road

The Borgward IV, officially designated Schwerer Ladungsträger Borgward B IV (heavy explosive carrier Borgward B IV), was a German remote-controlled demolition vehicle used in World War II.

== Design ==
During World War II, the Wehrmacht used three remotely operated demolition tanks: the light Goliath (Sd.Kfz. 302/303a/303b), the medium Springer (Sd.Kfz. 304) and the heavy Borgward IV (Sd.Kfz. 301). The Borgward IV was the largest of the vehicles and the only one capable of releasing its explosives before detonating; the two smaller vehicles were destroyed when their explosive charges detonated.

Borgward originally developed the B IV as an ammunition carrier, but it was found unsuitable. It was also tested as a remote minesweeper, but was too vulnerable to mines and too expensive. During the Battle of France, German engineers from the 1st Panzer Division converted 10 Panzer I Ausf Bs into demolition and mine clearing vehicles, using them to place timed charges on bunkers or minefields without losing the vehicle. The Waffenamt found the idea valuable, and ordered the B IV's development as a remote-controlled demolition vehicle. The first vehicles were delivered in 1942. The Borgward IV was much heavier than the Goliath, and carried a much larger payload. It was radio-controlled while the Goliath was wire guided. Due to the Borgward IV's much longer range, a driver inside the vehicle would drive it close to the final target before dismounting. It was then controlled during the attack from an armored vehicle, first a Panzer III tank, later a StuG III/G and finally the Tiger IE. These vehicles had extra radio equipment for the remote driver to steer the BIV to its target. When it reached the target, the vehicle was meant to drop the charge and leave the blast zone. While the Borgward IV was armored, its armor thickness was only 8mm in the A and B versions and 20mm in the C version. This was enough to protect it from small arms and shrapnel but inadequate against anti-tank rifles or light anti-tank guns. Its bigger size meant it was much easier to spot and target than the Goliath. Same as the smaller UGV, the remote driver had to keep sight of both the target and the vehicle in order be able to complete his mission.

== Variants ==
Three models of the Borgward were produced, Ausführung A, Ausf. B and Ausf. C, primarily differing in armor, weight and radio equipment.

The Borgward IV Ausf. A, the first model to enter serial production, was equipped with a 49-horsepower 6-cylinder water-cooled gasoline engine. Ausf. A was the most produced model, with approximately 616 made between May 1942 and June 1943.

In June 1943, production shifted to the similar Borgward IV Ausf. B. It was 400 kg (880 lb) heavier, with a different location for the radio antenna and better radio equipment. 260 of this variant were made between June and November 1943.

The final Borgward IV to see production, the Ausf. C, saw greater changes. The chassis was lengthened to 4.1 metres (13 ft 5 in) and the weight further increased. This last variant received thicker armor, new tracks and a new 78 horsepower 6-cylinder engine while the driver's seat was moved to the left. Ausf. C was produced from December 1943 to September 1944 when production ended, with 305 examples built.

Near the end of World War II, approximately 56 Ausf. Bs and Cs were converted to the Panzerjäger Wanze, armed with six RPzB 54/1 anti-tank rockets. In the last days of the war, these vehicles fought some minor skirmishes against Soviet armor and saw some action at the Battle of Berlin.

At least one Ausf. B was rebuilt as an amphibious vehicle, and in 1943, one Borgward IV was equipped with a television camera for observation.

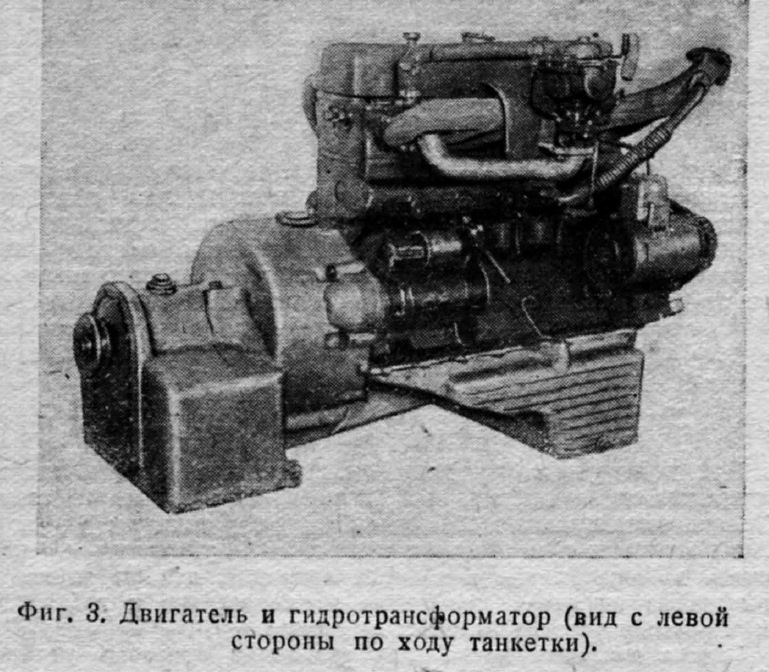
Borgward IV engine and hydraulic torque converter

Borgward IV production was relatively small: only 1,181 were made in total, as compared to 7,564 of the much smaller Goliath. Like Germany's other remote-controlled demolition vehicles, the Borgward IV was not considered a success; it was unreliable and expensive, although unlike the Goliath and Springer, it could be re-used multiple times if all went to plan.

== Survivors ==
Surviving examples of the Borgward IV are displayed in the Heeresgeschichtliches Museum in Vienna, the Kubinka Tank Museum, the American Heritage Museum in Greater Boston, USA, and the German Tank Museum in Munster. A fifth one in working condition is displayed in the Overlord Museum in Colleville-sur-Mer (Normandy-France).

On 31 March 2010, demolition work and excavation at Wien Südbahnhof uncovered a relatively well-preserved Borgward IV along with other relics from the Vienna Offensive. The Heeresgeschichtliches Museum salvaged and restored it for display there.

A full-scale, driveable replica was built in Poland for the shooting of Warsaw 44.

== See also ==
- Teletank
- Mobile Land Mine
- Unmanned ground vehicle
- American military report on the Borgward IV
