= Heuschrecke 10 =

Prototype of a self-propelled howitzer

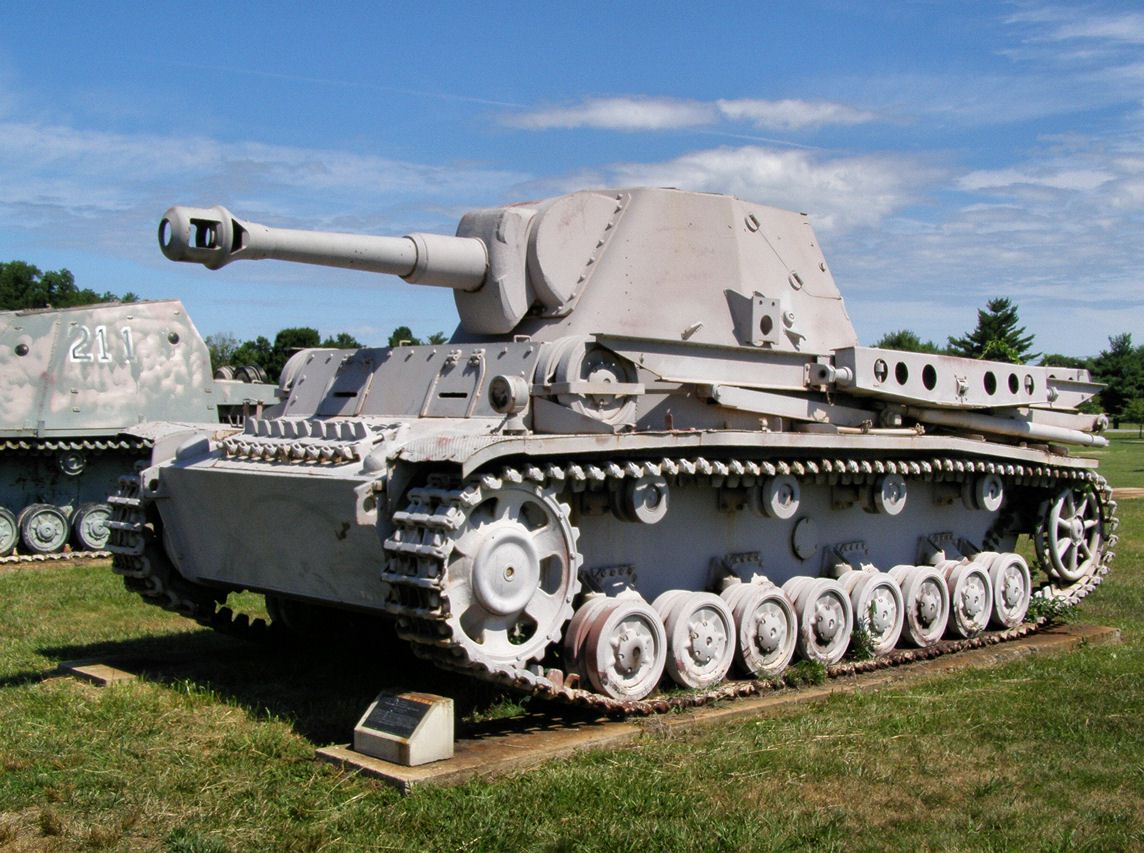
- A Heuschrecke 10 on display.
- Type: Prototype self-propelled howitzer
- Place of origin: Nazi Germany

Specifications
- Mass: 23 tonnes
- Length: 6 m (20 ft)
- Width: 3 m (9.8 ft)
- Height: 3 m (9.8 ft)
- Crew: 5 men (commander, gunner, 2 loaders and a driver)
- Armor: see below
- Main armament: 105 mm leFH 18/1 L/28
- Engine: Maybach HL90 12-cylinder 200 hp (149 kW)
- Power/weight: 15.6 hp/tonne
- Suspension: leaf spring
- Operational range: On road : 300 kilometers (190 mi)
- Maximum speed: 45 km/h (27.96 mph)

The Heuschrecke 10 (English: Grasshopper 10) was a German prototype self-propelled gun and Waffenträger (English: "Weapon carrier") developed by Krupp-Gruson between 1943 and 1944. The official designation of the vehicle was 105 mm leichte Feldhaubitze 18/1 L/28 auf Waffenträger Geschützwagen IVb (Pz. Sfl. IVb) and was to be built in Magdeburg, Germany. The Heuschrecke featured a removable turret which could be deployed as a pillbox or towed behind the vehicle as an artillery piece.

Krupp produced only three prototypes from 1942–1943. The Heuschrecke initially made use of a shortened Panzerkampfwagen IV (Panzer IV) chassis, but it was later switched to the Geschützwagen IV chassis, developed for the Hummel self-propelled gun. Mass production of the Heuschrecke 10 was scheduled to start in February 1945, but never occurred.

== Development ==
=== Precursor ===
Sd.Kfz. 165/1

Towards the end of September 1939, Krupp designed the "first real self-propelled artillery piece", the Sonderkraftfahrzeug 165/1 (Special Purpose Vehicle 165/1, abbreviated Sd.Kfz. 165/1). The Sd.Kfz. 165/1 was similar in design to the Heuschrecke, but did not have the chassis-mounted launching mechanism to remove the turret. After a series of tests, the Sd.Kfz. 165/1 was accepted by the Wehrmacht in early January 1940. In 1941, Krupp built prototype vehicles armed with the 105 mm leichte Feldhaubitze 18/1 L/28 (light field howitzer 18/1 L/28, abbreviated leFH 18/1 L/28) cannon based on a modified Panzer IV chassis. The prototypes were fitted with a smaller six-cylinder Maybach HL66P engine, which had a power capacity of 188 hp (140 kW). Although 200 vehicles were ordered, Krupp completed only 10 prototypes in the final four months of 1942. These saw service on the Eastern Front.

=== Prototypes ===
The design phase of the Heuschrecke began in 1942, when Krupp conceived a new type of self-propelled artillery. In 1943, Krupp produced three prototypes, with serial numbers from 582501 to 582503, which were designated as either Heuschrecke 10 or Heuschrecke IVb.

The Heuschrecke designed by Krupp was similar in design to a vehicle built by Alkett and Rheinmetall-Borsig, the 105 mm leFH 18/40/2 auf Geschützwagen III/IV, which was ready in March 1944. The competing Rheinmetall-Borsig model had overall slightly better performance than that of Krupps' vehicle. It was decided, however, to utilize an alternate chassis on the Rheinmetall-Borsig model, that of the Panzer IV. Production was to start in October 1944, but the chassis choice was changed to that of the Geschützwagen IV in December 1944. Production, in Magdeburg, was then intended to commence in February 1945, but none were produced.

=== Cancellation ===
The Nazi high command thought that the production of the Heuschrecke would disrupt the production of the needed Panzers. The quantity of materials required for the construction of weapon-carriers were so great that companies like Krupp were told to halt production. The majority of weapon-carriers never left the production stage. The Heuschrecke was seen as interesting by the General Inspector of the Panzer Troops, Heinz Guderian, however, Guderian agreed that their development was not worth the disruption to tank production. The development of the Heuschrecke was therefore canceled in February 1943.

== Design ==
=== Turret ===
The distinguishing feature of the Heuschrecke was its removable turret. A lifting gantry attached to the chassis could remove the turret for use on concrete fortifications or the ground. Although the howitzer could equally be fired from the chassis, the vehicle was designed to carry the artillery piece to a firing emplacement for removal before usage. The turretless vehicle could be used as an ammunition carrier or recovery vehicle. The prototype turret was armed with the 105 mm leFH 18/1 L/28. The production models, however, were to have the 105 mm leFH 43 L/28.

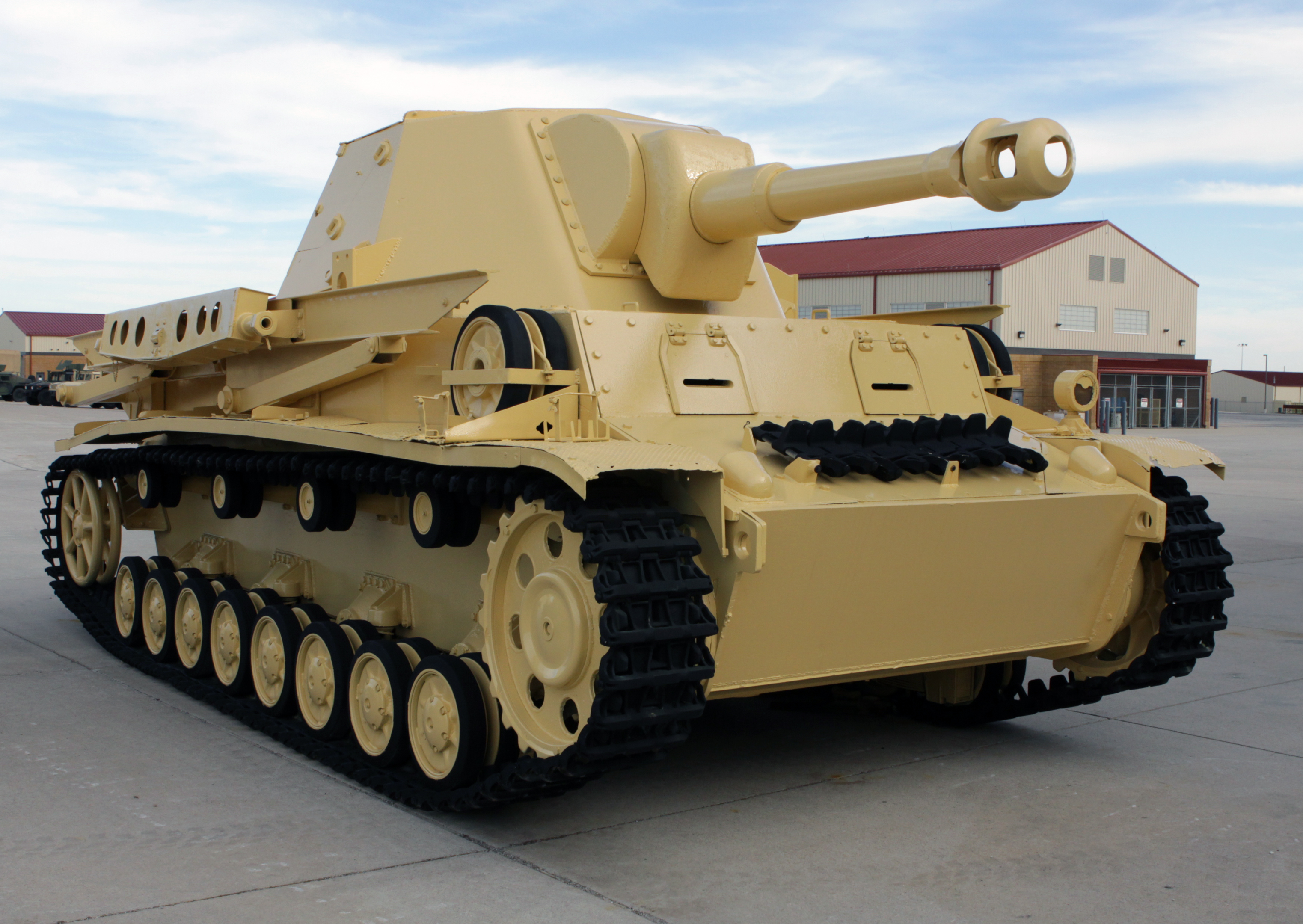
The Heuschrecke 10 after restoration by the Fort Sill DoL.

=== Chassis and engine ===
The Heuschrecke consisted of a welded steel hull, with thickness ranging from 10 to 25 millimeters, and sloped armour to deflect incoming fire more effectively. It had a large ammunition stowage, making it one of the chosen ammunition-carriers to help alleviate losses of ammunition that could not otherwise be transported. The original prototype engine was the twelve-cylinder Maybach HL90, but for the production models, the twelve-cylinder Maybach HL100 was chosen.

== Surviving vehicle ==
It is believed only one Heuschrecke survived the war. This sole survivor was originally on display at Aberdeen Proving Grounds. It was transferred from there to the Fort Sill Field Artillery Museum in Fort Sill, Oklahoma, along with several other World War II self-propelled guns. Shortly after its arrival at Fort Sill in 2012, the Grasshopper 10 was restored by the Fort Sill Directorate of Logistics paint shop.

== Specification comparison ==
Specifications
| Specifications | Sonderkraftfahrzeug.165/1 | Krupp-Gruson | Rheinmetall-Borsig |
|---|---|---|---|
| Weight | 18 tonnes | 23 tonnes | 25 tonnes |
| Crew | 4 | 5 | 5 |
| Engine | Maybach HL 66 6-cylinder 180 hp (134 kW) | Maybach HL 108 12-cylinder 250 hp (186 kW) | Maybach HL 90 12-cylinder 200 hp (149 kW) |
| Speed | 35 km/h (22 mph) | 45 km/h (28 mph) | 45 km/h (28 mph) |
| Range | Road: 240 km Cross-country: 130 km | Road: 300 km | Road: 300 km |
| Fuel capacity | 410 liters | | |
| Length | 5.90 m (19 ft 4 in) | 6.00 m (19 ft 8 in) | 6.80 m (22 ft 4 in) |
| Width | 2.87 m (9 ft 5 in) | 3.00 m (9 ft 10 in) | 3.00 m (9 ft 10 in) |
| Height | 2.25 m (7 ft 5 in) | 3.00 m (9 ft 10 in) | 2.90 m (9 ft 6 in) |
| Armament | 105 mm leichte Feldhaubitze 18/1 L/28 | | 105 mm leichte Feldhaubitze 18/40/2 L/28 |
| Ammunition | 60 rounds | 60 rounds | 80 rounds |
| Armor (mm/angle) | Front Superstructure: 30/10: Front Hull: 30/12; Front Turret: 20/20; Gun Mantlet: 20/0-70; Side Superstructure: 14.5/0; Side Hull: 14.5/0; Side Turret: 14.5/15; Rear Superstructure: 14.5/20; Rear Hull: 14.5/10; Rear Turret: 14.5/10; Top Superstructure: 10/90; Top/Bottom Hull: 14.5/90; Top Turret: open | Hull: Front 30/20; Side: 16/0; Rear: 16/20; Top/Bottom: 10/90; Turret; Front: 30 at 30°; Gun Mantlet: 30; Side and rear: 16 at 20–25°; Top: 0 (Open); Superstructure: Top 10/90; Front: 30 at 20°; Side: 16/0; Rear: 16/20 | Hull: Front: 20/20; Side: 20/0; Rear: 20/10; Top/Bottom: 10/90; Turret: Front: 10/25; Gun Shield: 10/0; Side: 10/25; Rear: 10/12; Top Turret: none; Superstructure: Top: 10/90; Front : 30/20; Side : 10/0; Rear: 10/10 |

== Bibliography ==
- Doyle, Hilary Louis & Jentz, Thomas L. (2023). "Sf. Artillerie: PzSfl.IVb to Hummel-Wespe". Panzer Tracts No. 10-1: Sf Artillerie (revised ed.). Old Heathfield, UK: Panzerwrecks. ISBN 978-1-915969-19-4.
