= List of VK-designated tanks =

This is a list of VK-designated tanks made by Germany from 1930s until 1945.

The term 'VK' was used in the naming of some German experimental or prototype tanks produced before and during World War II. It is an abbreviation for Vollketten ("fully tracked"), as opposed to HK, Halbketten (half-tracked), e.g. Kleines Kettenkraftrad HK 101.

The designation format was VK XX.XX (X). For example, in VK 30.01 (H) VK meaning Volketten, 30 for weight of 30 tonnes, 01 for the first iteration of the project, and (H) denoting the manufacturer Henschel.

Some designation layouts were different, like the VK XX or VK XXX (also called Vs.Kfz. XX or Vs.Kfz. XXX). For example, the Leichttraktor known as VK 31 (or Vs.Kfz. 31) with VK meaning Volketten (Vs. Kfz. meaning Versuchskampffahrzeug), and number "31" denoting the year of development.

== List of VK tanks ==
VK 16.02 Leopard

VK 30.01 (P)

DW 1, VK 30.01 (H), VK 36.01 (H), VK 65.01 (H)

- VK 6.01 - Panzer I Ausf. C
- VK 9.01 - Panzer II Ausf. G
- VK 9.03 - Panzer II Ausf. H and M
- VK 13.03 - Panzer II Ausf. L "Luchs"
- VK 13.05 - Flakpanzer Luchs
- VK 16.01 - Panzer II Ausf. J
- VK 16.02 - Leopard
- VK 18.01 - Panzer I Ausf. F
- VK 20.01 - designs for initially a 20-tonne tank to replace Panzer III and Panzer IV medium tanks.
- VK 30 series - 30-35 tonne class tank designs.
  - VK 30.01 (H) -Henschel design for 30-tonne breakthrough tank, two prototypes built. Two hulls were later reused as Sturer Emil.
  - VK 30.01 (P) - Porsche design for 30-tonne tank.
  - VK 30.01 (D) - Daimler-Benz design for a 30-tonne tank.
  - VK 30.02 (D) - Daimler-Benz design for a 30-tonne tank, initially ordered in 1942 but cancelled in favour of MAN design.
  - VK 30.02 (M) - MAN design for a 30-tonne tank, which evolved into the Panther tank.
- VK 36.01 (H) - re-design of VK 30.01 (H) to incorporate more armour, 8 chassis including one complete vehicle.
- VK 45.01 (H) - Henschel design accepted for production as Tiger I.
- VK 45.01 (P) - Porsche's competing design to Henschel's VK 45.01 (H), chassis built to the design were rebuilt as Elefant self-propelled anti-tank guns.
- VK 45.02 (H) - Tiger II prototype by Henschel.
- VK 45.02 (P) - Tiger II design by Porsche as a competitor to the Henschel's VK 45.02 (H), not built.
- VK 45.03 (H) - Henschel's "Tiger III".
- VK 65.01 (H) - Henschel's heavy tank project.
- VK 70.01-72.01 (K) - Panzer VII Löwe.
- VK 100+ - Panzer VIII Maus proposed designs.
- VK 31 - Leichttraktor.
- VK 302 - Pz. Sfl. 1a.
- VK 622 - Panzer IV Ausf. A.

== See also ==
- List of Sd.Kfz. designations
- List of tanks of the United Kingdom § General Staff numbers
