= VK 30.01-30.02 (D) =

German medium tank prototype

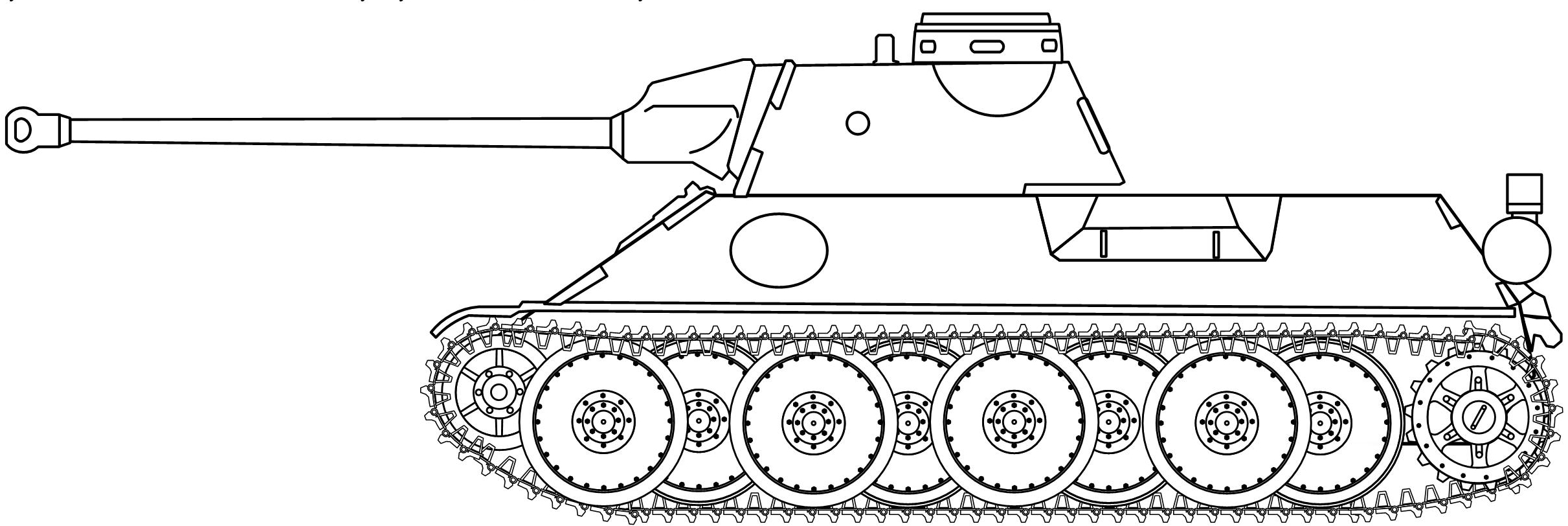
- VK 30.02 (D)
- Type: Medium tank
- Place of origin: Nazi Germany

Service history
- Used by: Nazi Germany
- Wars: World War II

Production history
- Designer: Daimler-Benz
- Designed: 1941–1942
- Manufacturer: Daimler-Benz
- No. built: 1 incomplete prototype

Specifications
- Mass: 35 t (34 long tons; 39 short tons)
- Length: 9.015 m (29 ft 6.9 in)
- Width: 3.280 m (10 ft 9.1 in)
- Height: 2.690 m (8 ft 9.9 in)
- Crew: 5 (driver, radio-operator/bow machine gunner, commander, gunner, loader)
- Armor: up to 80 mm (3.1 in)
- Main armament: 1 × 7.5 cm (3 in) KwK 42 L/70
- Secondary armament: 2 × 7.92 mm (0.3 in) MG 34 machine guns
- Engine: Maybach HL210 P45 V-12 petrol 650 horsepower (480 kW)
- Power/weight: 19 horsepower (14 kW)/tonne
- Suspension: torsion bar, interleaved road wheels
- Operational range: Road: 195 km (121 mi)
- Maximum speed: 56 km/h (35 mph)

The VK 30.01 (D) and VK 30.02 (D), also known as VK 3001 (DB) were two tank designs made by Daimler Benz submitted for the VK 30 project for a 30 tonne tank to be used by the German army.

The Versuchskonstruktion 30.01 (D) and 30.02 (D), in English "experimental design 30 tonnes Daimler", (Note: From German: Versuchskonstruktion, "experimental design") was intended to counter the Soviet T-34 and replace the Panzer III and IV medium tanks as a heavy "breakthrough" tank. It had been requested in 1941 by the German Government. The Daimler Benz design was rejected however, and the Maschinenfabrik Augsburg-Nürnberg (MAN) design was selected and entered service as the Panther tank.

== Development ==
When Germany invaded the Soviet Union in June 1941, they expected to be facing an inferior opponent. The T-34, with its sloped armor, and the heavily armored KV-1 caught the Wehrmacht off guard. Up until Operation Barbarossa, the Germans had been satisfied with the performance of their early Panzers, even after high losses during the Polish and French campaign, against the French Char B1 heavy tank. Ignoring these incidents, and an incident in spring 1941, when Hitler gave the order for a Soviet military commission to be allowed to see the latest in German tank design. The Soviet delegation refused to believe that they had been shown the latest model of the Panzer IV. Afterwards, because of their insistence, the German Ordnance Office came to the conclusion the Soviets were in possession of better and heavier tanks.

In October 1941, in the aftermath of the 4th Panzer Division's heavy losses of Panzer IVs on the road to Mtsensk, Generaloberst Heinz Guderian called for an investigation into the matter of tank warfare on the Eastern Front. In November German engineers, manufacturers and military procurement officials, including the Waffenamt (Army Weapons Department), were able to inspect and study captured T-34 tanks in order to understand what future German tank development would be needed in the next generation of German tanks. It was initially suggested by Guderian that the quickest way to counter the T-34 would be a direct copy. This was turned down by the Army Weapons Department however, because of the difficulties in producing sufficient numbers of diesel engines and steel alloy.

Initially four companies, Henschel (H), Porsche (P), Maschinenfabrik Augsburg-Nürnberg (MAN), and Daimler Benz (DB), were requested to build prototypes with the requirements for a fast heavy medium tank able to defeat the Soviet T-34 tank on the Eastern Front. Henschel's design, the VK 30.01(H), was considered outdated, with only the low-velocity 7.5 cm (3.0 in) Kwk 37 L/24 gun of the Panzer IV and resembled an enlarged version of that tank, but with the overlapping and interleaved Schachtellaufwerk roadwheel system coming from their half-track designs. The Porsche entry, the VK 30.01 (P), developed at the same time as the heavy VK 45.01 (P), was withdrawn when the Henschel's Tiger I went into production. This only left MAN and DB as contenders and so they were ordered to construct improved models, VK 30.02 (M) and VK 30.01 (D).

The VK 30.02 (DB) adopted several features of the T-34 over and above those specified by the army (sloped armour, large roadwheels, and overhanging gun) by using a diesel engine with rear transmission and jettisonable external fuel tanks. The design used leaf springs rather than more expensive torsion bar suspension.

The VK 30.02 (DB) was ordered into production with an initial target of 200 vehicles partly due to Hitler favouring the design. Hitler also requested the longer L70 gun rather than the 43-calibre long 75mm used to upgrade the Panzer IV. The Waffenprüfamt 6 committee however favoured the more conventional - in terms of German design and engineering - VK 30.02 (M) and ordered prototypes of it in May 1942 then quietly rescinded the DB order.

While the VK 30.01 (D) could have been cheaper and easier to produce, the German government preferred the roomier turret and more modern suspension of the MAN prototype, which went on to be the production Panther. The VK 30.02 (MAN) also shared the same engine as the Tiger, which would help with production and maintenance, it also had larger tracks, which would help with its ground pressure on soft ground. While the Panther was similar to the T-34 in shape, the VK 30.01 (DB)'s sloped front was similar, but overall, it was closer to earlier German tanks. Some sources say that one prototype was produced, others say that Daimler Benz produced three slightly different versions.

== Specifications ==
The VK 30.01 (D) was a fast, nimble tank weighing 35 tonnes (34 long tons; 39 short tons), with a top speed of 56 km/h (35 mph) and a cruising range of 195 km (121 mi). Its main armament was the 7.5 cm (3.0 in) KwK 42 L/70 gun. It had a crew of 5 (driver, commander, gunner, bow gunner/radio operator, and the loader), and its armour ranged between 16 and 80 mm (0.63 and 3.15 in).

== Operational use ==
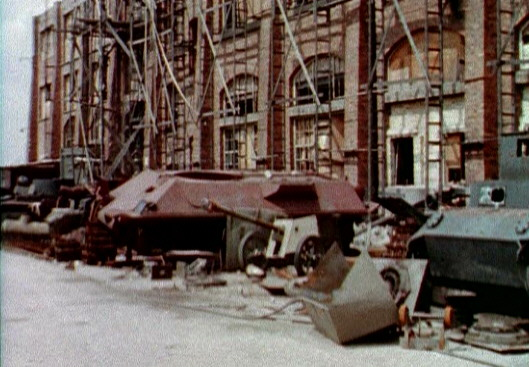
Abandoned VK 30.01 (D) in Daimler-Benz factory

One prototype VK 30.01(D) was produced but never saw combat service. The prototype survived the war.

== Bibliography ==
- Culver, Bruce (1975). Panther in Action. Squadron/Signal Publications. ISBN 0897470443.
- Doyle, Hilary Louis & Jentz, Thomas L. (2025) [2003]. Pz.Kpfw. Panther: Ausführung D. Vol. 5–1 (Revised ed.). Panzer Tracts. ISBN 978-1-915969-31-6.
- Hart, Stephan A. (2003). Panther Medium Tank 1942–45. New Vanguard 67. Osprey Publishing Ltd. ISBN 9781841765433.
- Jentz, Thomas L. (1997). Germany's Panther Tank - The Quest for Combat Supremacy. Schiffer Publishing Ltd. ISBN 9780887408120.
