= VK 30 series =

Series of German tank designs

The Versuchskonstruktion 30 were two series of tank designs by Germany in World War II, originally intended as heavy 'breakthrough' tanks, but later switching completely to designate medium tanks to succeed the Panzer III, IV, and the planned VK 20 series tanks. These were requested in response to the Soviet T-34 and KV-1 tanks, with far heavier armour and armament than the mobile armoured vehicles fielded by the Wehrmacht at the time. Many German companies submitted projects, including Maschinenfabrik Augsburg-Nürnberg (MAN), Daimler-Benz (DB), Henschel, and Porsche. The winning entry tanks would go on to become the famous Tiger I and Panther tanks, capable opponents to the T-34, but it was ultimately too late and at too small of a scale to affect the course of the war.

== List of VK 30 series designs ==
The VK 30 series were 30-35 tonne class tank designs.

- VK 30.01 (H) -Henschel design for 30-tonne breakthrough tank, two prototypes built. Two hulls were later reused as Sturer Emil.
- VK 30.01 (P) - Porsche design for 30-tonne tank.
- VK 30.01 (D) - Daimler-Benz design for a 30-tonne tank.
- VK 30.02 (D) - Daimler-Benz design for a 30-tonne tank, initially ordered in 1942 but cancelled in favour of MAN design.
- VK 30.02 (M) - MAN design for a 30-tonne tank, which evolved into the Panther tank.

== Tiger tank entries ==
The origins of the first VK 30 began with the need for a breakthrough tank, or Durchbruchswagen in 1937, resulting in a few successive iterations.

Porsche submitted heavily armoured tank designs, but they were unconventional and also unsuccessful. This was dropped in 1938, around the same time as the start of the VK 20 project, in favour of the first VK 30 designs. These were submitted by Henschel and Porsche. However, it slowly grew in weight and Henschel redubbed it the VK 36.

On May 26 1941, Hitler ordered the production of prototypes for a new heavy tank, resulting in the VK 45 project, and later the VK 45.01 (H) Tiger I. The VK 45.01 (P) or Porsche-Tiger, was later turned into the Ferdinand tank destroyer and used at the Battle of Kursk.

== Panther tank entries ==
On 13 May 1942, the entries for the medium tank were submitted to the Panzer branch of the Waffenamt Prüfwesen (Wa Prüf 6). These included the MAN and DB models. DB presented an entry very similar to the T-34, but upgraded to German standards. It incorporated a similar full front plate sloped armour design akin to their entry for the VK 20 series of tanks. The DB entry held an early lead and was much simpler. However, the MAN entry finally won due to complications in turret production for the DB design that would have resulted in delayed production. It was rejected partially because it looked too much like a T-34 and could be mistaken for an enemy tank on the battlefield.

== See also ==
- VK 30.01 (P), a prototype medium tank developed by Porsche for the heavy tank competition.
