= German encounter of Soviet T-34 and KV tanks =

Military event

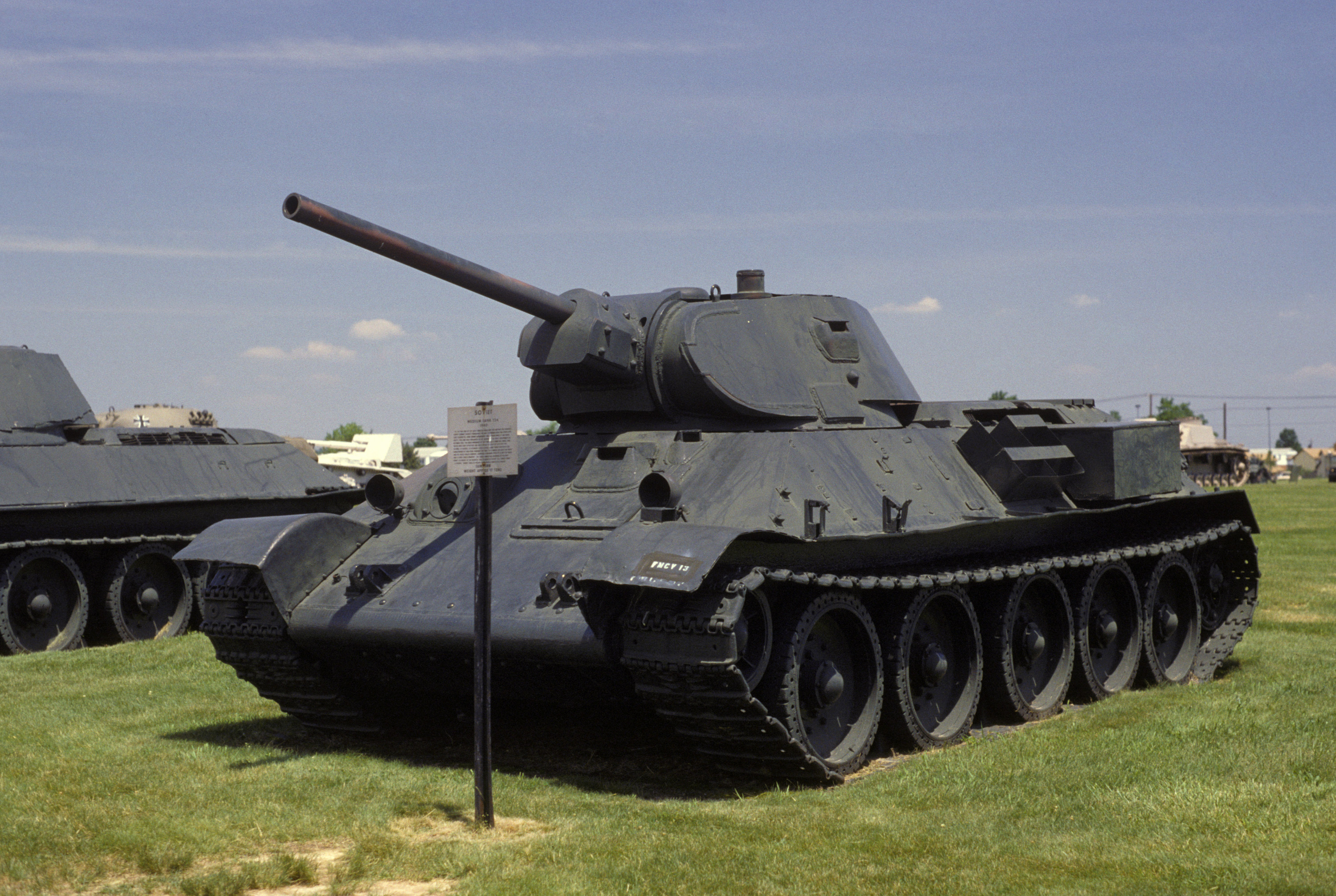
T-34-76 (Model 1941) (26 tonnes) at Aberdeen Proving Grounds in 1987

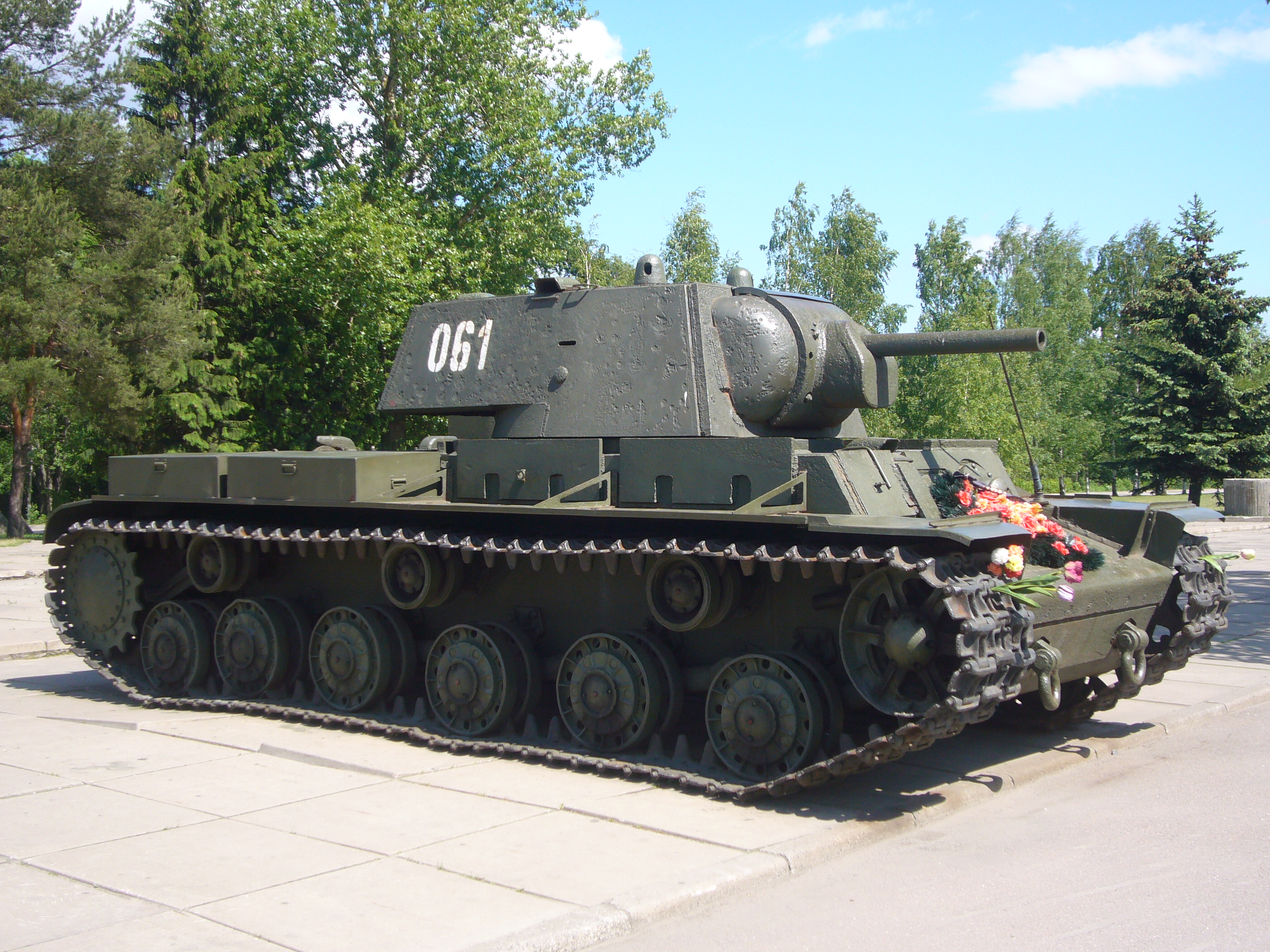
KV-1 (45 tonnes) on display in Kirovsk

Prior to the invasion of the Soviet Union during World War II, the German armed forces were not aware of two newly developed Soviet tanks, the T-34 and the KV. As a result, they were surprised when they met them in combat for the first time in June 1941. The Germans' standard anti-tank weapons were found to be ineffective against these new Soviet vehicles. This experience prompted a notable leap in tank development in Nazi Germany, mainly in an effort to counter these new threats.

By 22 June 1941, the Red Army deployed almost 1,000 T-34 and over 500 KV tanks, concentrated in five of their twenty-nine mechanized corps. By the end of December 1941, they had lost 2,300 T-34 and over 900 KV tanks, accounting for 15% of the 20,500 tanks lost that year.

== Initial encounters ==
At the beginning of Operation Barbarossa, the Germans were expecting little from their opponent's tank forces, which were composed of the old T-26 and BTs. While most of the Soviet Union's armoured forces were composed of such tanks, the T-34 and the KV designs, which were previously unknown, took the Germans by surprise. Both types were encountered on the second day of the invasion – 23 June 1941.

Half a dozen anti-tank guns fire shells at him [a T-34], which sound like a drumroll. But he drives staunchly through our line like an impregnable prehistoric monster... It is remarkable that lieutenant Steup's tank made hits on a T-34, once at about 20 meters and four times at 50 meters, with Panzergranate 40 (caliber 5 cm), without any noticeable effect.

— German battle report, Finkel

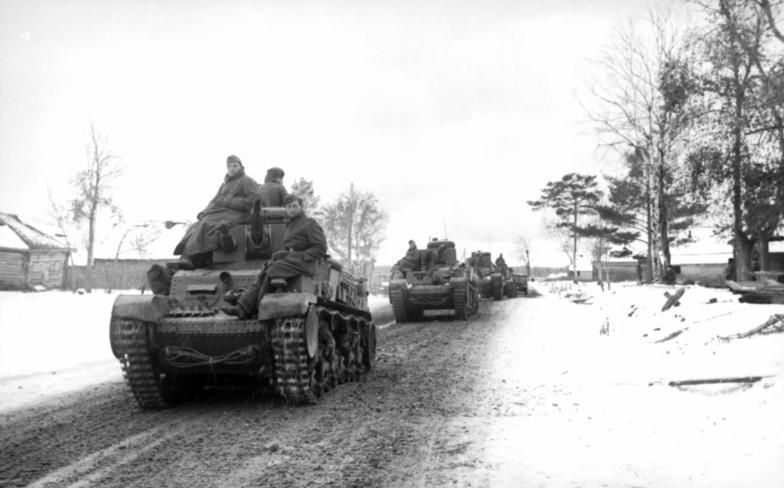
The much smaller German 11 tonne Panzer 35(t)

The KV tanks were usually assigned to the same units as the more numerous T-34 and, although they were much larger, their overall performance was quite similar; many sources discuss the impact of both types. The most common model of KV was the KV-1. It was in the Battle of Raseiniai where German forces encountered the Soviet KV for the first time. The Soviet 2nd Tank Division from the 3rd Mechanized Corps attacked and overran elements of the German 6th Panzer Division near Skaudvilė on 23 June. German Panzer 35(t) light tanks and anti-tank weapons were practically ineffective against the Soviet armoured giants, which closed with and, even though some of them were out of ammunition, destroyed some German anti-tank guns by simply driving over them.

The next day, at a crossroads near Raseiniai, Lithuania, a single KV heavy tank managed to block the advance of elements of the 6th Panzer Division, which had established bridgeheads on the Dubysa River. It stalled the German advance for a full day while being attacked by a variety of anti-tank weapons before being overrun after it finally ran out of ammunition.

== Tank versus tank engagements ==
Historians initially believed that the new tanks were "scattered" among the army in small numbers, but recent research shows the exact opposite. The new tanks were concentrated into dedicated types of formations, such as the mechanized corps.

While the re-creating of the mechanised corps had been organised as proposed by Georgy Zhukov, this had not been completed when Nazi Germany attacked in 1941. Originally done under Marshal Tukhachevsky, the mechanised corps had been broken up by the Commissar for Defence Marshal Voroshilov in a misreading of the lessons of the Spanish Civil War and the Winter War with Finland. Voroshilov had been replaced by Marshal Timoshenko as Commissar in May 1940. Zhukov had drawn a different conclusion about armoured warfare from the success of the panzers in France and from his own experience in the Battles of Khalkhin Gol against Japan.

Selected Soviet mechanized corps on 22 June 1941
Soviet corps	Soviet divisions	Total Soviet tanks	T-34 and KV
6th Mechanized Corps	4th, 7th, 29th	1,131	452 (Note: On June 1 there were 114 KVs, 238 T-34s, but another 100 T-34s were received by June 22, 1941. The number is confirmed by the American author David M. Glantz.)
4th Mechanized Corps	8th, 32nd, 81st	979	414
8th Mechanized Corps	12th, 34th, 7th	899	171
15th Mechanized Corps	10th, 37th, 212th	749	136
3rd Mechanized Corps	2nd, 5th, 84th	672	110
7th Mechanized Corps	14th, 18th, 1st	959	103
16th Mechanized Corps	15th, 39th, 240th	478	76
2nd Mechanized Corps	11th, 16th, 15th	527	60
22nd Mechanized Corps	19th, 41st, 215th	712	31
11th Mechanized Corps	29th, 33rd, 204th	414	20
5th Mechanized Corps	13th, 17th, 109th	1,070	17
Total		8,590	1,590

German disposition of tanks on 22 June 1941
German corps	German divisions	Total German tanks (Note: Total German tanks includes non-combat "commander tanks" as well as outdated Panzer I and Panzer IIs)	Tanks with 37 mm gun (incl. Panzer 38(t) and Panzer III)	Tanks with 50 mm or larger gun (incl. Panzer III and Panzer IV)
XXXXI Panzer Corps	1st, 6th	390	155	121
LVI Panzer Corps	8th	212	118	30
XXXIX. Armeekorps mot	7th, 20th	494	288	61
LVII Panzer Corps	12th, 19th	448	219	60
XXXXVII Panzer Corps	17th, 18th	420	99	187
XXXXVI Panzer Corps	10th	182	0	125
XXIV Panzer Corps	3rd, 4th	392	60	207
III Panzer Corps	13th, 14th	296	42	140
XXXXVIII Panzer Corps	11th, 16th	289	47	135
XIV Panzer Corps	9th	143	11	80
Any other unit of Army Group North, Centre, or South		0	0	0
Total		3,266	1,039	1,146

Among the mechanized corps (MC), four formations were especially well equipped. On the day of German invasion, about 70% of the total T-34 and KV tanks produced at that time were deployed in the 4th, 6th, 8th, and 15th MC. The 6th MC operated in the Białystok area, and all of the others in the Soviet Ukraine. All of their engagements with German tanks happened during or just before the Battle of Brody:

- The 15th MC destroyed 43 German tanks for the loss of 13 KVs, six T-34s and 32 BTs from 22 to 26 June 1941;
- The 8th MC lost up to 95% of its tanks in fierce fighting in the Dubno area between 26 June and 1 July 1941. (Note: The exact proportion of combat to non-combat losses is not known. See Battle of Brody (1941) for description. Solonin, pp. 261–262.)

Tank-to-tank battles were rare at the beginning of Operation Barbarossa as the Germans did not seek them; they preferred to bypass the Soviet armour whenever possible. The two stand-out formations, the 4th and 6th MCs, lost almost all of their T-34 and KVs during movement, not from any German attack. Both corps tried to assemble counterattacks against German infantry (not against panzers), but the counterattacks had no impact and were barely noticeable. The same pertained to the 15th MC after 26 June.

In the first two weeks of the invasion, the Soviet Union suffered the loss of most of its T-34s and KVs, as well as the loss of most of the older tanks:

- By 12 July 1941, the 4th MC had 45 new vehicles out of the original 414.
- By 27 June, the 6th MC had ceased to exist, having lost all 450 new tanks.
- By 7 July, the 8th MC had 43 tanks (both old and new) out of an original 899.
- By 7 July, the 15th MC had 66 tanks (both old and new) out of an original 749.

On one hand, these corps had, within weeks, lost most of their T-34s and KVs, but on the other hand, German reports did not note such a massive elimination in combat. The number of non-combat losses was unprecedented.

== German anti-tank capability ==
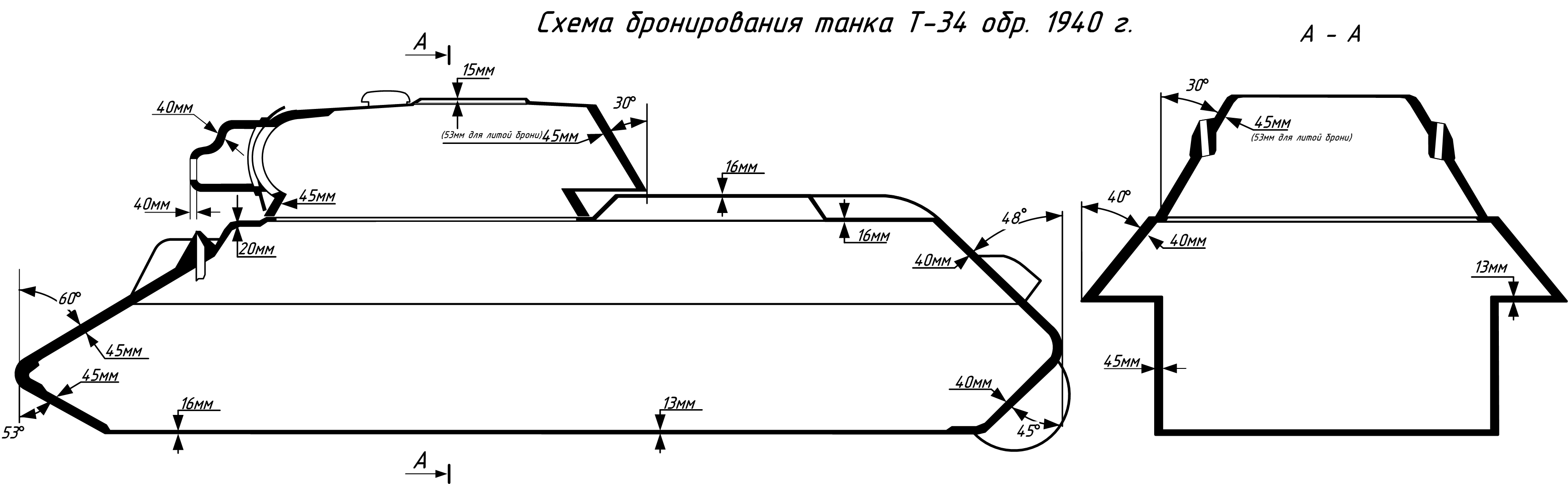
Sloped armor of T-34 model 1940

In the first weeks of the invasion, the main German anti-tank and tank weapon was the 3.7 cm Pak 36, the 5 cm KwK 38 and 5 cm KwK 39, as well as the short-barreled, howitzer-like German 7.5 cm KwK 37 gun. The new 5 cm Pak 38 had just begun to enter service in small numbers, with a maximum of two weapons per infantry regiment.

German tank guns proved to be somewhat ineffective at greater range and within the lethality envelope of the F-34 tank gun used by the T-34 and KV-1. Generally, the T-34 outclassed the existing Panzer III and short-barreled Panzer IV medium tanks.

Attempts to destroy the T-34s and KVs concentrated on first immobilising them by firing at their tracks and then by tackling them with field artillery, anti-aircraft guns, or by blowing them up at close range by shaped charge grenades.

Sources of T-34 Losses to German Guns by Caliber (%) June 1941-September 1942
20 mm	37 mm	50 mm	75 mm	88 mm	105 mm	Unknown
4.7	10	61.8	10.1	3.4	2.9	7.1

== Impact on tank design worldwide ==
On 4 October 1941, the 4th Panzer Division, part of General Heinz Guderian's Panzer Group 2 suffered a severe setback at Mtsensk, near Oryol. Heinz Guderian demanded an inquiry into the realities of tank warfare on the Eastern Front, suggesting that the quickest solution was to produce a direct copy of the T-34.

A special Panzerkommision arrived on the Eastern Front on 20 November 1941 to assess the T-34. The Weapons Department held that Germany would have difficulty copying the T-34 as Guderian had suggested, because of the quantity of steel alloy and diesel engines required. Hence a new German medium tank was proposed, incorporating three features of the T-34: a long overhanging gun, good off-road mobility from large tracks, and sloped glacis armour to give greater protection with a modest thickness of armour.

Daimler-Benz and MAN were asked to develop a 30-tonne tank, Daimler-Benz with their VK 30.02 (D) and MAN with their VK 30.02 (M), incorporating a new Rheinmetall turret. Hitler preferred the Daimler-Benz, but the Weapons Department preferred the MAN, which was more like earlier German tanks. Originally, the VK20, a new 20-tonne tank, had been proposed in 1938 as the next German tank, but this project was clearly inadequate now. In May 1942, MAN was contracted to produce pre-production prototypes, although the Panther tank did not enter production until 1943, and the Model D Panther with increased thickness of armour now weighed 44.8 tonnes. Their combat deployment in June 1943 for Operation Citadel was a debacle. The larger Tiger I heavy tank was also in use by this time.

== Bibliography ==
- Buell, Thomas B; Bradley, John N; Griess, Thomas E; Dice, Jack W; Bradley, John H (2002). The Second World War: Europe and the Mediterranean. Garden City Park (NY): Square One Publishers. ISBN 0-7570-0160-2.
- Cross, Robin (1993). Citadel: The Battle of Kursk. New York: Sarpedon. ISBN 0-9627613-6-2.
- Doyle, Hilary; Jentz, Tom (1997). Panther Variants 1942-45. London: Osprey. ISBN 978-1-85532-476-3.
- Finkel, Meir (2011). On flexibility: recovery from technological and doctrinal surprise on the battlefield. Stanford, California: Stanford Security Studies. ISBN 978-0-8047-7489-5.
- Forczyk, Robert (2007). Panther vs T-34 : Ukraine 1943 (1 ed.). Oxford: Osprey. ISBN 978-1-84603-149-6.
- Glantz, David M. (2010). Barbarossa derailed : the battle for Smolensk, 10 July-10 September 1941. Solihull: Helion. ISBN 978-1-906033-72-9.
- Handel, Michael I. (1989). War, strategy, and intelligence (1. publ. ed.). London, England: F. Cass. ISBN 0-7146-3311-9.
- Hart, Stephen (2003). Panther Medium Tank 1942-45. Osprey Publishing (UK). ISBN 1-84176-543-0.
- Newton, Steven H (2003). Panzer Operations on the Eastern Front- The Memoirs of General Raus 1941-1945. Da Capo Press. ISBN 0-306-81247-9.
- Solonin, Mark (2007). Tomasz Lisiecki (ed.). 22 czerwca 1941 czyli Jak zaczęła się Wielka Wojna ojczyźniana (in Polish) (1 ed.). Poznań, Poland: Dom Wydawniczy Rebis. ISBN 978-83-7510-130-0. (the only English translations of Solonin's works seem to be, as of June 2011, these online chapters)
- Stolfi, R.H.S (1993). Hitler's panzers east: World War 2 reinterpreted. Norman: University of Oklahoma Press. ISBN 0-8061-2581-0.
- Zaloga, Steven; Kinnear, Jim; Sarson, Peter (1995). KV 1 & 2 HEAVY TANKS 1939-45. Oxford: Osprey Publishing. ISBN 1-85532-496-2.
