= Pz.Sfl. Ia =

Pz.Sfl.1a
- Type: Tank destroyer
- Place of origin: Nazi Germany

Specifications
- Mass: 4.5 tons
- Length: 3.57 m (11 ft 9 in)
- Width: 1.83 m (6 ft 0 in)
- Crew: 3
- Armor: 14.5 mm (0.57 in)
- Main armament: 5 cm PaK 38
- Engine: Borgward 6M RTBV six-cylinder 50 hp (37 kW)
- Maximum speed: 30 km/h (19 mph)

Panzerselbstfahrlafette 1a 5 cm PaK 38 auf Gepanzerter Munitionsschlepper (Note: Literally "Armored self-propelled gun 1a 5 cm [anti-tank gun] 38 on armored ammunition carrier") (Pz. Sfl. 1a) was a German light tank destroyer that was developed during World War II. Armed with the 5 cm PaK 38 anti-tank gun it was intended to be air portable and support airborne troops. Two examples were produced but as the 5 cm Pak 38 was now an outdated weapon it did not enter production.

== History ==
In July 1940, Rheinmetall-Borsig was tasked by the Wehrmacht to develop a new light tank destroyer that could be used by airborne troops. Rheinmetall used the new recently developed Borgward VK 302 armored ammunition carrier as its basis, and armed it with the 5 cm PaK 38.

== Description ==
=== Armament ===
The vehicle was armed with the 5 cm PaK 38 gun with 32 rounds of ammunition and without any secondary armament. It was primarily intended to be used by German airborne troops, who needed such vehicle that could be transported by plane. The 5 cm PaK 38 was mounted on top of the engine compartment, with one man on each side. A limited traverse mount allowed 40° traverse and – 10 + 20° elevation.

Ammunition was stored alongside the driver in the place that was formerly occupied by the commander. To cope with the recoil loads imposed on the very small chassis, a spade was lowered at the rear of the vehicles. The armor ranged from 8 – 14.5 mm. The fighting compartment, was the area behind the antitank gun’s armored gunshield. This offered protection only from 7.92mm armor ammunition. Self-propelled gun was operated by the crew of three people: the driver he was placed inside the vehicle, gunner who was placed left of the gun and loader. who was right of the gun.

=== Hull and casemate ===
The dimensions of this vehicle were: width 1.83m, length 3.57m and height 1.44m (VK 302). Combat weight is in the range of 4.5 tons, it could reach up to 30 km/h with its Borgward 6M RTBV six-cylinder 50 hp engine, with operational range of 150 km. There is no information if any of these vehicles were equipped with a radio, and if there was any room for it.

In September 1941, another light fighting vehicle prototype was ordered. This was to be the Borgward VK 301 armed with the 10.5 cm LG recoilless gun designed by Rheinmetall-Borsig for paratroops use. A Krupp proposal a 360° traverse turret configuration. Only one mock-up model was completed.

== Production and action ==
It was planned to produce some 200 vehicles, but only two were ever built and these were sent off for troop trials in July 1942. However, by that time the 5 cm PaK 38 was no longer a viable anti-tank gun and the whole project was abandoned. Little is known about their combat performance. Production of the Borgward VK 302 ammuntion carrier was cancelled in 1941 and the design used instead for the Sprengladungsträger Borgward IV remote controlled demolition vehicle.
