= Panzer IV =

German WWII medium tank

Panzerkampfwagen IV Sd.Kfz. 161
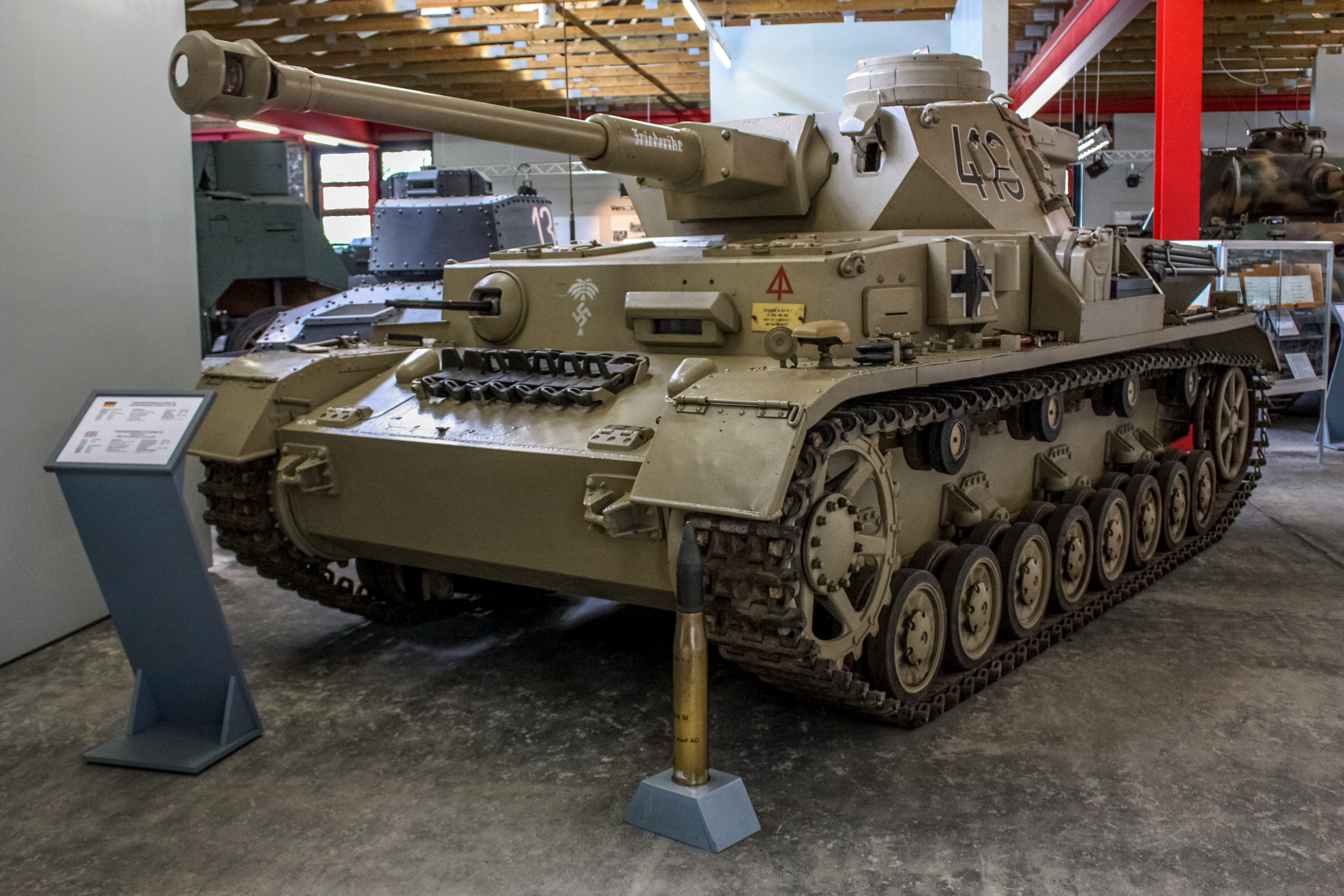
- A Panzer IV Ausf. G "413" in desert colours, bearing the palm tree insignia of the Afrika Korps, «Friederike» inscribed in Fraktur script on the gun barrel near the mantlet
- Type: Medium tank
- Place of origin: Nazi Germany

Service history
- In service: 1939–1945 (Nazi Germany); 1954–1973 (Syria)
- Used by: Nazi Germany; Romania; Turkey; Hungary; Bulgaria; Italy; Finland; Spain; Croatia; USSR; France; Syria
- Wars: World War II; War over Water; Six-Day War; Yom Kippur War

Production history
- Designer: Krupp
- Designed: 1936
- Manufacturer: Krupp, Vomag, Nibelungenwerk
- Unit cost: ~103,462 ℛ︁ℳ︁ (~490,000 USD); ~115,962 ℛ︁ℳ︁ With 7.5 cm KwK 40 (L/43) (~550,000 USD); USD equivalents as of 2000
- Produced: 1936–1945
- No. built: 8,553 of all tank variants
- Variants: StuG IV, Jagdpanzer IV, Brummbär (Sturmpanzer IV), Nashorn, Wirbelwind, Ostwind

Specifications (Pz. IV Ausf. H, 1943)
- Mass: 25.0 tonnes (27.6 short tons; 24.6 long tons)
- Length: 5.92 m (19 ft 5 in); 7.02 m (23 ft 0 in) gun forward
- Width: 2.88 m (9 ft 5 in)
- Height: 2.68 m (8 ft 10 in)
- Crew: 5 (commander, gunner, loader, driver, radio operator/bow machine-gunner)
- Armour: Hull front: 80 mm (3.1 in); Hull side (upper and lower): 30 mm (1.2 in); Hull rear (upper and lower): 20 mm (0.79 in); Hull roof and floor: 10 mm (0.39 in); Schürzen: 5 mm (0.20 in) to 8 mm (0.31 in); Turret front: 50 mm (2.0 in); Turret side and rear: 30 mm (1.2 in); Turret roof: 10 mm (0.39 in)
- Main armament: 7.5 cm (2.95 in) KwK 40 L/48 main gun (87 rounds)
- Secondary armament: 2 × 7.92 mm MG 34 machine guns (3,150 rounds)
- Engine: Maybach HL120 TRM 12-cylinder petrol engine 300 PS (296 hp, 220 kW)
- Power/weight: 12 PS (8.8 kW) / tonne
- Transmission: (Synchromesh ZF SSG 77) 6 forward and 1 reverse ratios
- Suspension: Leaf spring
- Fuel capacity: 470–750 L (120–200 US gal)
- Operational range: Road: 235–360 km (146–224 mi); Cross-country: 120–235 km (75–146 mi)
- Maximum speed: 38 to 42 km/h (24 to 26 mph) maximum, 25 km/h (16 mph) max sustained road speed, 16 km/h (9.9 mph) off-road

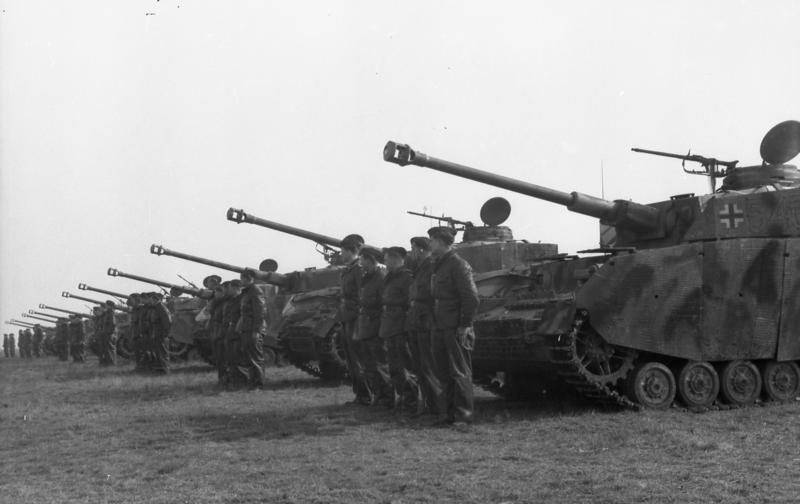
12th SS "Hitlerjugend" division in France

The Panzerkampfwagen IV (Pz.Kpfw. IV), commonly known as the Panzer IV, is a German medium tank developed in the late 1930s and used extensively during the Second World War. Its ordnance inventory designation was Sd.Kfz. 161.

The Panzer IV was the most numerous German tank and the second-most numerous German fully tracked armoured fighting vehicle of the Second World War; 8,553 Panzer IVs of all versions were built during World War II, only exceeded by the StuG III assault gun with 10,086 vehicles. Its chassis was also used as the base for many other fighting vehicles, including the Sturmgeschütz IV assault gun, the Jagdpanzer IV self-propelled anti-tank gun, the Wirbelwind and Ostwind self-propelled anti-aircraft guns, and the Brummbär self-propelled gun.

The Panzer IV saw service in all combat theatres involving Germany and was the only German tank to remain in continuous production throughout the war. The Panzer IV was originally designed for infantry support, while the similar Panzer III was to fight armoured fighting vehicles. However, as the Germans faced the formidable T-34, the Panzer IV had more development potential, with a larger turret ring to mount more powerful guns, so it swapped roles with the Panzer III whose production wound down in 1943. The Panzer IV received various upgrades and design modifications, intended to counter new threats, extending its service life. Generally, these involved increasing the armour protection or upgrading the weapons, although during the last months of the war, with Germany's pressing need for rapid replacement of losses, design changes also included simplifications to speed up the manufacturing process.

The Panzer IV was partially succeeded by the Panther medium tank, which was introduced to counter the Soviet T-34, although it continued to be a significant component of German armoured formations to the end of the war. It was the most widely exported tank in German service, with around 300 sold to Finland, Romania, Spain and Bulgaria. After the war, Syria procured Panzer IVs from France and Czechoslovakia, which saw combat in the 1967 Six-Day War.

== Development history ==
=== Origins ===
The Panzer IV was the brainchild of the German general and innovative armoured warfare theorist Heinz Guderian. In concept, it was intended to be a support tank for use against enemy anti-tank guns and fortifications. Ideally, each tank battalion in a panzer division was to have three medium companies of Panzer IIIs and one heavy company of Panzer IVs. On 11 January 1934, the German army wrote the specifications for a "medium tractor", and issued them to a number of defense companies. To support the Panzer III, which would be armed with a 37-millimetre (1.46 in) anti-tank gun, the new vehicle would have a short-barreled, howitzer-like 75-millimetre (2.95 in) as its main gun, and was allotted a weight limit of 24 tonnes (26.46 short tons). Development was carried out under the name Begleitwagen ("accompanying vehicle"), or BW, to disguise its actual purpose, given that Germany was still theoretically bound by the Treaty of Versailles ban on tanks. MAN, Krupp, and Rheinmetall-Borsig each developed prototypes, with Krupp's being selected for further development.

The chassis had originally been designed with a six-wheeled Schachtellaufwerk interleaved-road wheel suspension (as already adopted for German half-tracks), but the German Army amended this to a torsion bar system. Permitting greater vertical deflection of the road wheels, this was intended to improve performance and crew comfort both on- and off-road. However, due to the urgent requirement for the new tank, neither proposal was adopted, and Krupp instead equipped it with a simple leaf spring double-bogie suspension, with eight rubber-rimmed road wheels per side.

The prototype had a crew of five; the hull contained the engine bay to the rear, with the driver and radio operator, who doubled as the hull machine gunner, seated at the front-left and front-right, respectively. In the turret, the tank commander sat beneath his roof hatch, while the gunner was situated to the left of the gun breech and the loader to the right. The torque shaft ran from the rear engine to the transmission box in the front hull between the driver and radio operator. To keep the shaft clear of the rotary base junction, which provided electrical power to the turret including the motor to turn it, the turret was offset 66.5 mm (2.62 in) to the left of the chassis centre line, and the engine was moved 152.4 mm (6.00 in) to the right. Due to the asymmetric layout, the right side of the tank contained the bulk of its stowage volume, which was taken up by ready-use ammunition lockers.

Accepted into service under the designation Versuchskraftfahrzeug 622 (Vs.Kfz. 622), "experimental motor vehicle 622", production began in 1936 at Fried. Krupp Grusonwerk AG factory at Magdeburg.

=== Ausf. A to Ausf. F1 ===
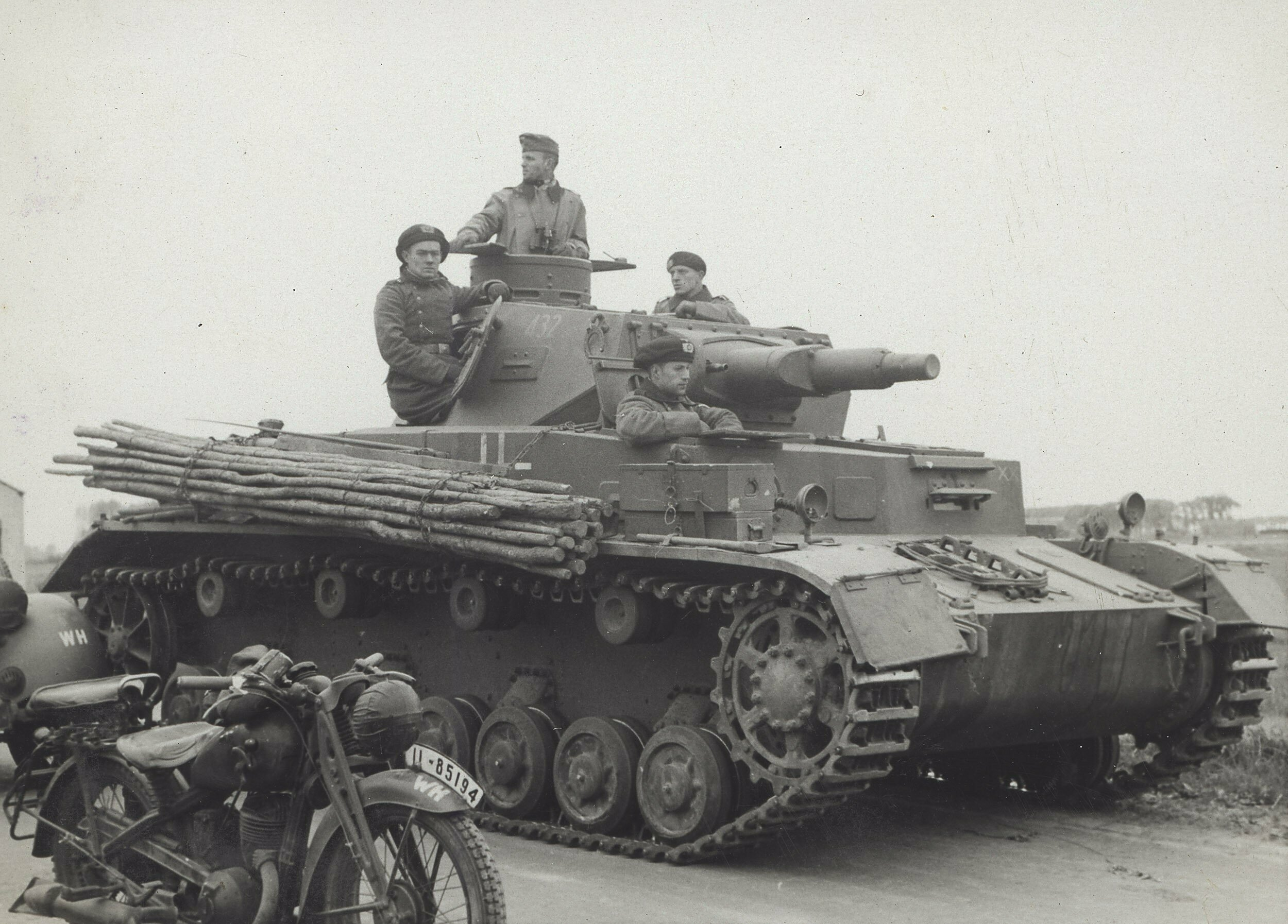
Panzer IV Ausf. A in 1940

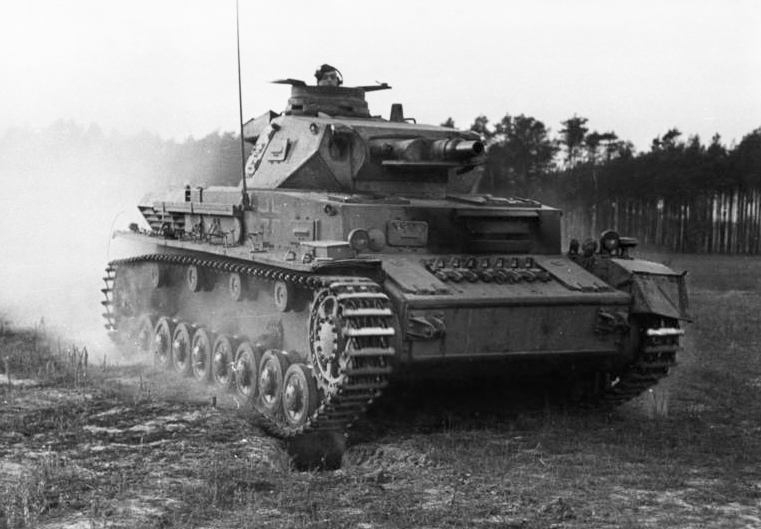
Panzer IV Ausf. C, 1943

The first mass-produced version of the Panzer IV was the Ausführung A (abbreviated to Ausf. A, meaning "Variant A"), in 1936. It was powered by a Maybach HL108 TR, producing 250 PS (180 kW), and used the SGR 75 transmission with five forward gears and one reverse, achieving a maximum road speed of 31 km/h (19 mph). As main armament, the vehicle mounted the 7.5 cm (2.95 in) KwK 37 (Note: Kampfwagenkanone meaning "fighting vehicle gun"), a short barrelled (24 calibres in length) low-velocity weapon mainly designed to fire high-explosive shells. Against armoured targets, firing the Panzergranate (armour-piercing shell) at 430 m/s (1,410 ft/s) the KwK 37 could penetrate 43 mm (1.69 in), inclined at 30 degrees, at ranges of up to 700 m (2,300 ft). A 7.92 mm (0.31 in) MG 34 machine gun was mounted coaxially with the main weapon in the turret, while a second machine gun of the same type was mounted in the front plate of the hull. The main weapon and coaxial machine gun were sighted with a Turmzielfernrohr 5b optic while the hull machine gun was sighted with a Kugelzielfernrohr 2 optic. The Ausf. A was protected by 14.5 mm (0.57 in) of steel armour on the front plate of the chassis, and 20 mm (0.79 in) on the turret. This was only capable of stopping artillery fragments, small-arms fire, and light anti-tank projectiles. A total of 35 Ausf A tanks were produced.

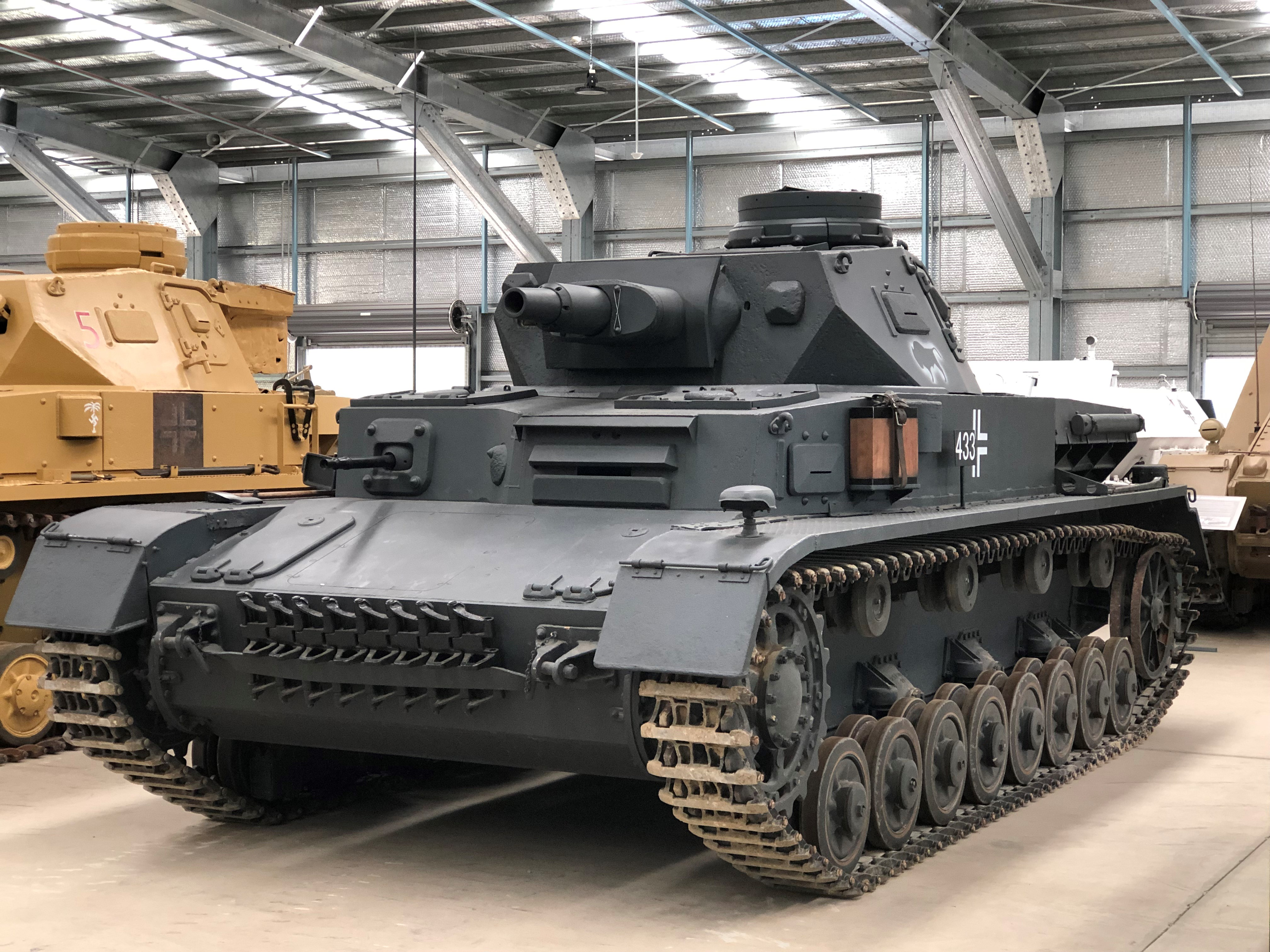
Panzer IV Ausf. D in the Australian Armour and Artillery Museum. In addition to armour upgrades, the bow machine gun was re-introduced.

In 1937, production moved to the Ausf. B. Improvements included the replacement of the original engine with the more powerful 300 PS (220.65 kW) Maybach HL 120TR, and the transmission with the new SSG 75 transmission, with six forward gears and one reverse gear. Despite a weight increase to 16 t (18 short tons; 16 long tons), this improved the tank's speed to 42 km/h (26.10 mph). The glacis plate was augmented to a maximum thickness of 30 mm (1.18 in), while a new driver's visor was installed on the straightened hull front plate, and the hull-mounted machine gun was replaced by a covered pistol port and visor flap. The superstructure width and ammunition stowage were reduced to save weight. A new commander's cupola was introduced, which was adopted from the Panzer III Ausf. C. A Nebelkerzenabwurfvorrichtung (smoke grenade discharger rack) was mounted on the rear of the hull starting in July 1938 and was back fitted to earlier Ausf. A and Ausf. B chassis starting in August 1938. Forty-two Panzer IV Ausf. Bs were manufactured.

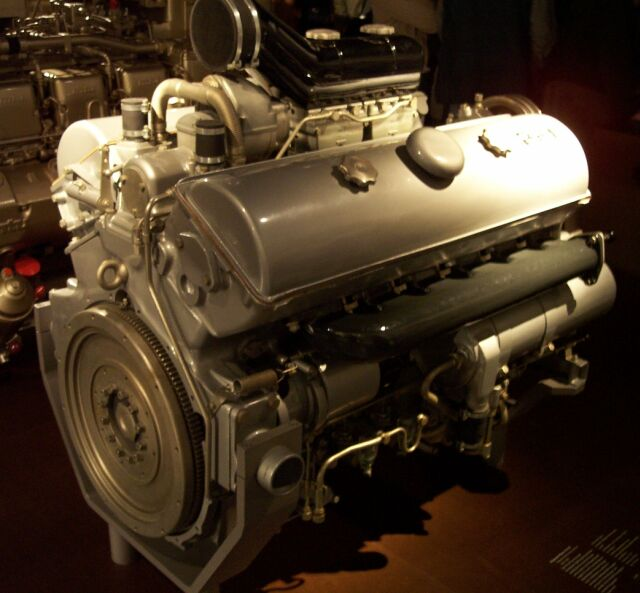
The 300 horsepower Maybach HL120 TRM engine used in most Panzer IV production models

The Ausf. C replaced the B in 1938. This saw the turret armour increased to 30 mm (1.18 in), which brought the tank's weight to 18.14 t (20.00 short tons). After assembling 40 Ausf. Cs, starting with chassis number 80341, the engine was replaced with the improved HL 120TRM. The last of the 140 Ausf. Cs was produced in August 1939.

Production changed to the Ausf. D; this variant, of which 248 vehicles were produced, reintroduced the hull machine gun and changed the turret's internal gun mantlet to a 35 mm (1.38 in) thick external mantlet. Again, protection was upgraded, this time by increasing side armour to 20 mm (0.79 in). As the German invasion of Poland in September 1939 came to an end, it was decided to scale up production of the Panzer IV, which was adopted for general use on 27 September 1939 as the Sonderkraftfahrzeug 161 (Sd.Kfz. 161).

In response to the difficulty of penetrating the thick armour of British infantry tanks (Matilda and Matilda II) during the Battle of France, the Germans had tested a 50 mm (1.97 in) gun — based on the 5 cm Pak 38 anti-tank gun – on a Panzer IV Ausf. D. However, with the rapid German victory in France, the original order of 80 tanks was cancelled before they entered production.

In October 1940, the Ausf. E was introduced. This had 30 mm (1.18 in) of armour on the bow plate, while a 30-millimetre (1.18 in) appliqué steel plate was added to the glacis as an interim measure. A new driver's visor, adopted from the Sturmgeschütz III was installed on the hull front plate. A new commander's cupola, adopted from the Panzer III Ausf. G, was relocated forward on the turret eliminating the bulge underneath the cupola. Older model Panzer IV tanks were retrofitted with these features when returned to the manufacturer for servicing. 206 Ausf. Es were produced between October 1940 and April 1941.

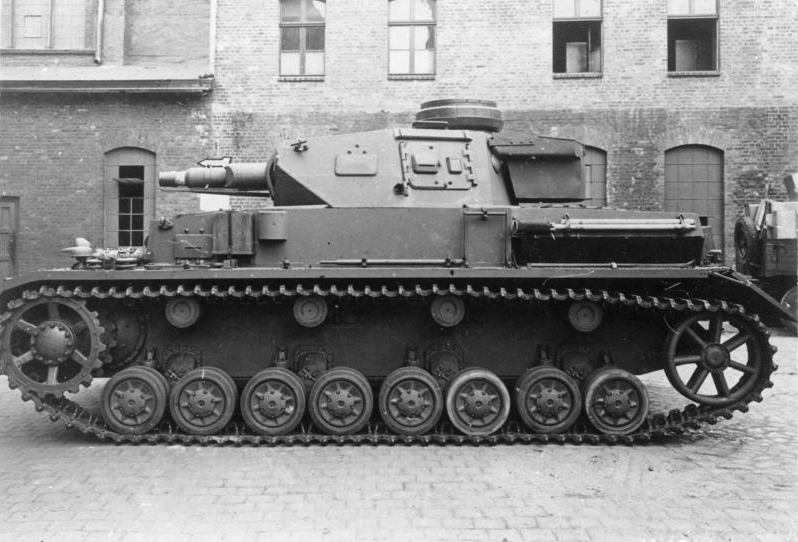
The short-barreled Panzer IV Ausf. F1

In April 1941, production of the Panzer IV Ausf. F started. It featured 50 mm (1.97 in) single-plate armour on the turret and hull, as opposed to the appliqué armour added to the Ausf. E, and a further increase in side armour to 30 mm (1.18 in). The main engine exhaust muffler was shortened and a compact auxiliary generator muffler was mounted to its left. The weight of the vehicle was now 22.3 t (24.6 short tons), which required a corresponding modification of track width from 380 to 400 mm (14.96 to 15.75 in) to reduce ground pressure. The wider tracks also facilitated the fitting of track shoe "ice sprags", and the rear idler wheel and front sprocket were modified. The designation Ausf. F was changed in the meantime to Ausf. F1, after the distinct new model, the Ausf. F2, appeared. A total of 471 Ausf. F (later temporarily called F1) tanks were produced from April 1941 to March 1942.

=== Ausf. F2 to Ausf. J ===
On 26 May 1941, mere weeks before Operation Barbarossa, during a conference with Hitler, it was decided to improve the Panzer IV's main armament. Krupp was awarded the contract to integrate again the 50 mm (1.97 in) Pak 38 L/60 gun into the turret. The first prototype was to be delivered by 15 November 1941. Within months, the shock of encountering the Soviet T-34 medium and KV-1 heavy tanks necessitated a new, much more powerful tank gun. In November 1941, the decision to up-gun the Panzer IV to the 50-millimetre (1.97 in) gun was dropped, and instead Krupp was contracted in a joint development to modify Rheinmetall's pending 75 mm (2.95 in) anti-tank gun design, later known as 7.5 cm Pak 40 L/46.

Because the recoil length was too great for the tank's turret, the recoil mechanism and chamber were shortened. This resulted in the 75-millimetre (2.95 in) KwK 40 L/43. When the new KwK 40 was loaded with the Pzgr. 39 armour-piercing shell, the new gun fired the AP shell at some 750 m/s (2,460 ft/s), a substantial 74% increase over the howitzer-like KwK 37 L/24 gun's 430 m/s (1,410 ft/s) muzzle velocity. Initially, the KwK 40 gun was mounted with a single-chamber, ball-shaped muzzle brake, which provided just under 50% of the recoil system's braking ability. Firing the Panzergranate 39, the KwK 40 L/43 could penetrate 77 mm (3.03 in) of steel armour at a range of 1,830 m (6,000 ft).

The longer 7.5 cm guns made the vehicle nose-heavy to such an extent that the forward suspension springs were under constant compression. This resulted in the tank tending to sway even when no steering was being applied, an effect compounded by the introduction of the Ausführung H in March 1943.

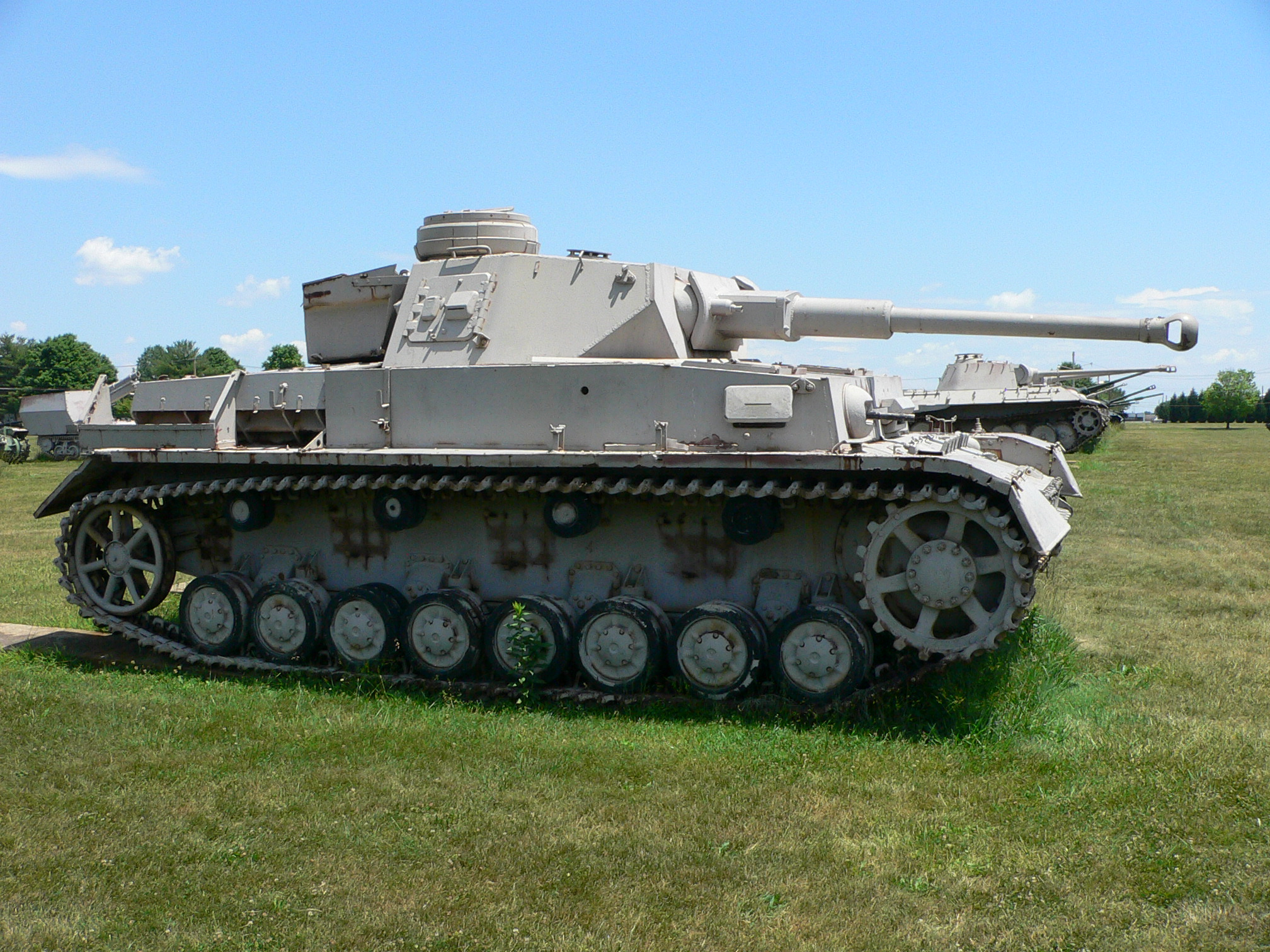
The 1942 Panzer IV Ausf. F2 was an upgrade of the Ausf. F, fitted with the KwK 40 L/43 anti-tank gun to counter Soviet T-34 medium and KV heavy tanks

The Ausf. F tanks that received the new, longer, KwK 40 L/43 gun were temporarily named Ausf. F2 (with the designation Sd.Kfz. 161/1). The tank increased in weight to 23.6 tonnes (26.0 short tons). Differences between the Ausf. F1 and the Ausf. F2 were mainly associated with the change in armament, including an altered gun mantlet, internal travel lock for the main weapon, new gun cradle, new Turmzielfernrohr 5f optic for the L/43 weapon, modified ammunition stowage, and discontinuing of the Nebelkerzenabwurfvorrichtung in favor of turret mounted Nebelwurfgerät. Three months after beginning production, the Panzer IV Ausf. F2 was renamed Ausf. G.

During its production run from March 1942 to June 1943, the Panzer IV Ausf. G went through further modifications, including another armour upgrade, which consisted of a 30-millimetre (1.18 in) face-hardened appliqué steel plate welded (later bolted) to the glacis—in total, so that frontal armour was now 80 mm (3.15 in) thick. This decision to increase frontal armour was favorably received according to troop reports on 8 November 1942, despite technical problems with the driving system due to added weight. At this point, it was decided that 50% of Panzer IV production would be fitted with 30 mm (1.18 in) thick additional armour plates. On 5 January 1943, Hitler decided that all Panzer IVs should have 80 mm (3.15 in) frontal armour. To simplify production, the vision ports on either side of the turret and the loader's forward vision port in the turret front were removed, while a rack for two spare road wheels was installed on the track guard on the left side of the hull. Complementing this, brackets for seven spare track links were added to the glacis plate.

For operation in high temperatures, the engine's ventilation was improved by creating slits over the engine deck to the rear of the chassis, and cold weather performance was boosted by adding a device to heat the engine's coolant, as well as a starter fluid injector. A new light replaced the original headlight and the signal port on the turret was removed. On 19 March 1943, the first Panzer IV with Schürzen skirts on its sides and turret was exhibited. The double hatch for the commander's cupola was replaced by a single round hatch from very late model Ausf. G. and the cupola was up-armoured from 50 mm (1.97 in) to 95 mm (3.74 in). In April 1943, the KwK 40 L/43 was replaced by the longer 75-millimetre (2.95 in) KwK 40 L/48 gun, with a redesigned multi-baffle muzzle brake with improved recoil efficiency. The longer L/48 resulted in the introduction of the Turmzielfernrohr 5f/1 optic.

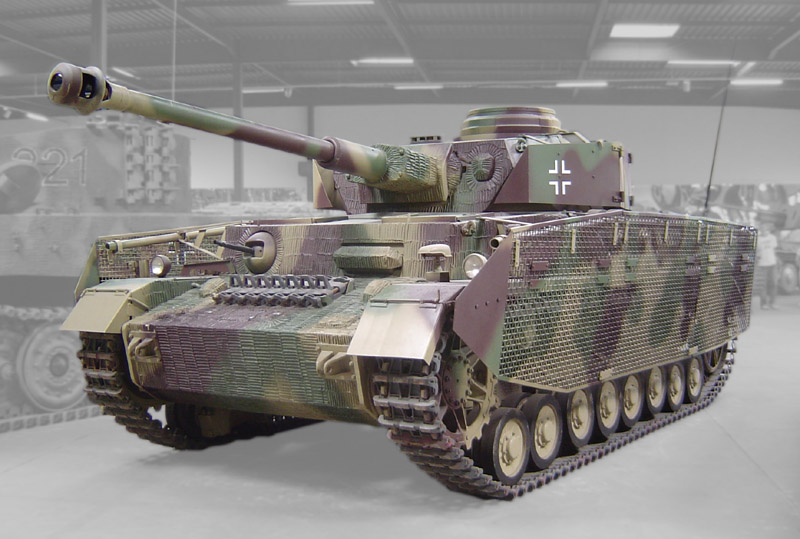
A Panzer IV Ausf. J at the Musée des Blindés in Saumur, France, with its distinctive Zimmerit anti-magnetic mine coating, turret skirts, and wire-mesh side-skirts

The next version, the Ausf. H, began production in June 1943 and received the designation Sd. Kfz. 161/2. The integrity of the glacis armour was improved by manufacturing it as a single 80-millimetre (3.15 in) plate. A reinforced final drive with higher gear ratios was introduced. To prevent adhesion of magnetic anti-tank mines, which the Germans feared would be used in large numbers by the Allies, Zimmerit paste was added to all the vertical surfaces of the tank's armour. The turret roof was reinforced from 10-millimetre (0.39 in) to 16-millimetre (0.63 in) and 25-millimetre (0.98 in) segments. The vehicle's side and turret were further protected by the addition of 5-millimetre (0.20 in) hull skirts and 8-millimetre (0.31 in) turret skirts. This resulted in the elimination of the vision ports located on the hull side, as the skirts obstructed their view. During the Ausf. H's production run, its rubber-tired return rollers were replaced with cast steel, a lighter cast front sprocket and rear idler wheel gradually replaced the previous components, the hull was fitted with triangular supports for the easily damaged side skirts, the Nebelwurfgerät was discontinued, and a mount in the turret roof, designed for the Nahverteidigungswaffe, was plugged by a circular armoured plate due to initial production shortages of this weapon.

These modifications meant that the tank's weight increased to 25 tonnes (27.56 short tons). In spite of a new six-speed SSG 77 transmission adopted from the Panzer III, top speed dropped to as low as 16 km/h (10 mph) on cross country terrain. An experimental version of the Ausf H was fitted with a hydrostatic transmission but was not put into production.

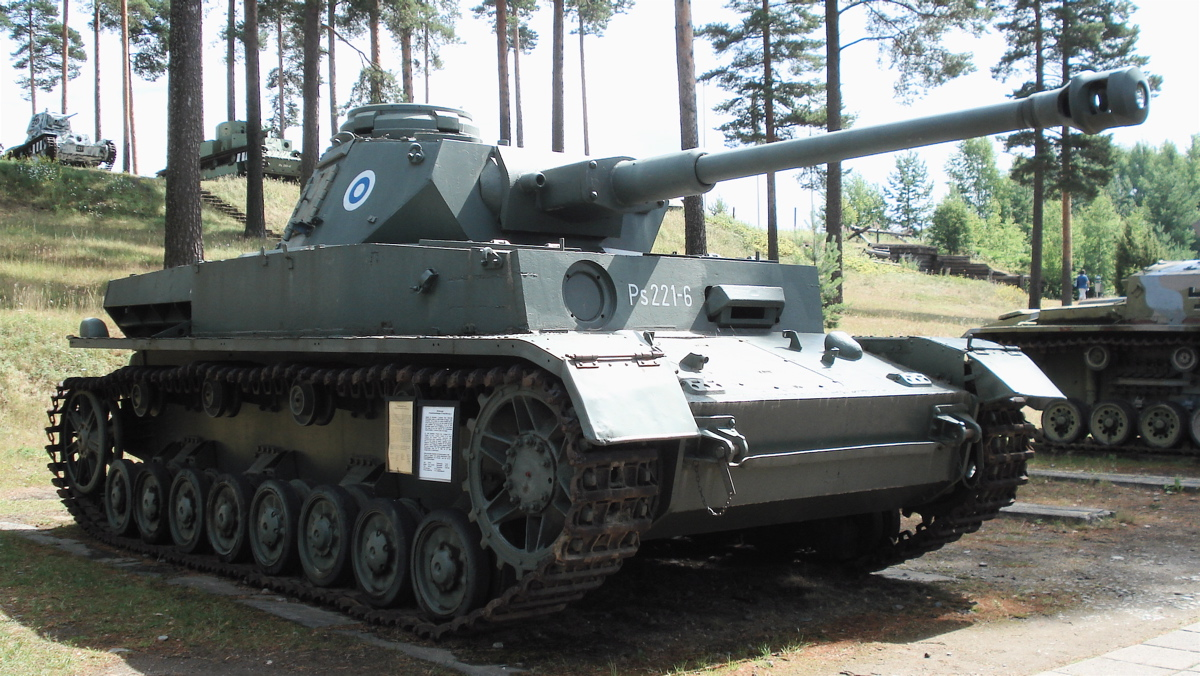
The Ausf. J was the final production model, and was greatly simplified compared to earlier variants to speed construction. This shows an exported Finnish model.

Despite addressing the mobility problems introduced by the previous model, the final production version of the Panzer IV—the Ausf. J—was considered a retrograde step from the Ausf. H. Born of necessity, to replace heavy losses, it was greatly simplified to speed production. The electric generator that powered the tank's turret traverse was removed, so the turret had to be rotated manually. The turret traversing mechanism was modified and fitted with a second gear which made hand-operation easier when the vehicle was on sloping terrain. On reasonably level ground, hand operation at 4 seconds to traverse to 12.5° and 29.5 seconds to traverse to 120° was achieved. The resulting space was later used for the installation of an auxiliary 200-litre (53 US gal) fuel tank; road range was thereby increased to 320 km (200 mi), The remaining pistol and vision ports on the turret side hatches were removed, and the engine's radiator housing was simplified by changing the slanted sides to straight sides. Three sockets with screw threads for mounting a 2-ton jib boom crane were welded on the turret roof while the hull roof was thickened from 11-millimetre (0.43 in) to 16-millimetre (0.63 in). In addition, the cylindrical muffler was replaced by two flame-suppressing mufflers. In June 1944 Wa Prüf 6 had decided that because bomb damage at Panzerfirma Krupp in Essen had seriously jeopardized tank production, all plates which should have been face-hardened for the Panzer IV were instead made with rolled homogeneous armour plate. By late 1944, Zimmerit was no longer being applied to German armoured vehicles, and the Panzer IV's side-skirts had been replaced by wire mesh, while the gunner's forward vision port in the turret front was eliminated and the number of return rollers was reduced from four to three to further speed-up production.

In a bid to augment the Panzer IV's firepower, an attempt was made to mate a Schmalturm turret – carrying the longer 75 mm (2.95 in) L/70 tank gun from the developing Panther Ausf. F tank design, and partly developed by Rheinmetall from early 1944 onwards – to a Panzer IV hull. This failed and confirmed that the chassis had reached the limit of its adaptability in both weight and available volume.

== Production ==
Panzer IV production by year
Date	Number of vehicles	Variant (Ausf.)
1937–1939	262	A – D
1940	290 (−24)	D, E
1941	480 (+17)	E, F
1942	994	F, G
1943	2,983	G, H
1944	3,125	H, J
1945	~435	J
Total	~8,569	all

The Panzer IV was originally intended to be used only on a limited scale, so initially Krupp was its sole manufacturer. Prior to the Polish campaign, only 217 Panzer IVs had been produced: 35 Ausf. A; 42 Ausf. B; and 140 Ausf. C; in 1941, production was extended to Vogtländische Maschinenfabrik ("VOMAG") (located in the city of Plauen) and the Nibelungenwerk in the Austrian city of St. Valentin.

In 1941, an average of 39 tanks per month were built; this rose to 83 in 1942, 252 in 1943, and 300 in 1944. However, in December 1943, Krupp's factory was diverted to manufacture the Sturmgeschütz IV and, in the spring of 1944, the Vomag factory began production of the Jagdpanzer IV, leaving the Nibelungenwerk as the only plant still assembling the Panzer IV. With the slow collapse of German industry under pressure from Allied air and ground offensives—in October 1944 the Nibelungenwerk factory was severely damaged during a bombing raid—by March and April 1945, production had fallen to pre-1942 levels, with only around 55 tanks per month coming off the assembly lines.

The total production time, including all components manufactured by subcontractors, was estimated at approximately 15,000 labor hours.

Panzer IV: comparison of key production features
Version	Main gun	Superstructure armour mm (inch)			Hull armour mm (inch)			Turret armour mm (inch)			Weight tonnes (long tons; short tons)	Engine	Notes
Version	Main gun	F	S	R	F	S	R	F	S	R	Weight tonnes (long tons; short tons)	Engine	Notes
Ausf. A VK622	7.5 cm KwK 37 L/24	15 (0.59)									18.4 (18.1; 20.3)	Maybach HL 108TR; 250 PS (247 hp; 184 kW)	SGR 75 transmission
Ausf. B	7.5 cm KwK 37 L/24	30 (1.2)	15 (0.59)	15 (0.59)	30 (1.2)	15 (0.59)	15 (0.59)	30 (1.2)	15 (0.59)	15 (0.59)	18.8 (18.5; 20.7)	Maybach HL 108TR; 250 PS (247 hp; 184 kW)	SSG 75 transmission
Ausf. C	7.5 cm KwK 37 L/24	30 (1.2)	15 (0.59)	15 (0.59)	30 (1.2)	15 (0.59)	15 (0.59)	30 (1.2)	15 (0.59)	15 (0.59)	19.0 (18.7; 20.9)	Maybach HL 120 TRM; 300 PS (296 hp; 221 kW)	
Ausf. D	7.5 cm KwK 37 L/24	30 + 30 (Note: appliqué armour plate, bolted or welded on)	20 (0.79) + 20	20 (0.79)	30 (1.2)	20 (0.79)	20 (0.79)	30 (1.2)	20 (0.79)	20 (0.79)	20.0 (19.7; 22.0)	Maybach HL 120 TRM; 300 PS (296 hp; 221 kW)	
Ausf. E	7.5 cm KwK 37 L/24	30 + 30	20 + 20	20	30 + 30	20 + 20	20	30	20	20	21.0 (20.7; 23.1)	Maybach HL 120 TRM; 300 PS (296 hp; 221 kW)	
Ausf. F1	7.5 cm KwK 37 L/24	50 (2.0)	30 (1.2)	20 (0.79)	50 (2.0)	30 (1.2)	20 (0.79)	50 (2.0)	30 (1.2)	30 (1.2)	22.3 (21.9; 24.6)	Maybach HL 120 TRM; 300 PS (296 hp; 221 kW)	track width increased from 380 to 400 mm (15 to 16 in)
Ausf. F2	7.5 cm KwK 40 L/43	50	30	20	50	30	20	50	30	30	23.0 (22.6; 25.4)	Maybach HL 120 TRM; 300 PS (296 hp; 221 kW)	single-chamber, globe, muzzle brake
Ausf. G	7.5 cm KwK 40 L/43	50 + 30	30	20	50 + 30	30	20	50	30 + 8 (0.31) (Note: Schürzen skirts)	30 + 8	23.5 (23.1; 25.9)	Maybach HL 120 TRM; 300 PS (296 hp; 221 kW)	multi-baffle muzzle brake
Ausf. H	7.5 cm KwK 40 L/48	80 (3.1)	30	20	80	30	20	50	30 + 8	30 + 8	25.0 (24.6; 27.6)	Maybach HL 120 TRM; 300 PS (296 hp; 221 kW)	Zimmerit paste added to vertical surfaces SSG 77 transmission
Ausf. J	7.5 cm KwK 40 L/48	80	30	20	80	30	20	50	30 + 8	30 + 8	25.0 (24.6; 27.6)	Maybach HL 120 TRM; 300 PS (296 hp; 221 kW)	electric motor for turret traverse removed, Rolled homogeneous armour, no Zimmerit

== Export ==
The Panzer IV was one of the most widely exported German tanks of the Second World War. In 1942, Germany delivered 11 tanks to Romania and 32 to Hungary, many of which were lost on the Eastern Front between the final months of 1942 and the beginning of 1943 during the battles around Stalingrad, at which the Hungarian and Romanian troops there were almost annihilated by the attacking Soviet forces. Romania received approximately 120 Panzer IV tanks of different models throughout the entire war. To arm Bulgaria, Germany supplied 46 or 91 Panzer IVs, and offered Italy 12 tanks to form the nucleus of a new Italian Army armoured division. These were used to train Italian tank crews while the-then Italian leader Benito Mussolini was deposed shortly after the Allied conquest of Sicily but were then retaken by Germany during its occupation of Italy in mid-1943. The Falangist Spanish government petitioned for 100 Panzer IVs in March 1943 but only 20 were ever delivered by December that same year. Finland bought 30 but only received 15 in 1944 and in the same year a second batch of 62 or 72 was sent to Hungary (although 20 of these were subsequently diverted to replace German military losses). The Croatian Ustashe Militia received 10 Ausf. F1 and 5 Ausf. G in the autumn of 1944. In total, 297 Panzer IVs of all models were delivered to Germany's allies.

== Combat history ==
Percentage of late war panzer models operational
Date	Western front			Eastern front		
Date	Pz IV	Panther	Tiger	Pz IV	Panther	Tiger
31 May 44	88	82	87	84	77	79
14 Sep 44	80	74	98	65	72	70
30 Sep 44	50	57	67	65	60	81
31 Oct 44	74	85	88	52	54	54
15 Nov 44	78	71	81	72	66	61
30 Nov 44	76	71	45	78	67	72
15 Dec 44	78	71	64	79	69	79
30 Dec 44	63	53	50	72	62	80
15 Jan 45	56	47	58	71	60	73
15 Mar 45	44	32	36	54	49	53
Average	71	65	65	68	62	70

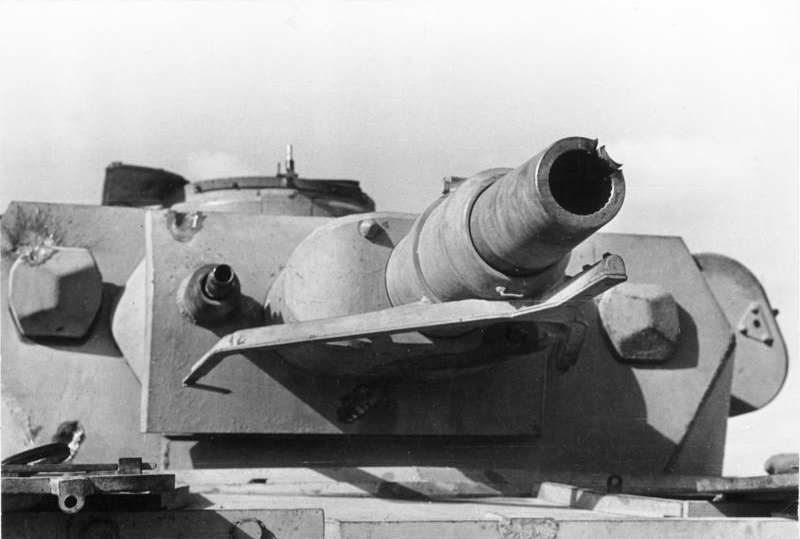
A Panzer IV Ausf. E with hits on the turret and the edge of the gun barrel

The Panzer IV was the only German tank to remain in both production and combat throughout World War II, and measured over the entire war it comprised 30% of the Wehrmacht's total tank strength. Although in service by early 1939, in time for the occupation of Czechoslovakia, at the start of the war the majority of German armour was made up of obsolete Panzer Is and Panzer IIs. The Panzer I in particular had already proved inferior to Soviet tanks, such as the T-26, during the Spanish Civil War.

=== Poland, Western Front and North Africa (1939–1942) ===
When Germany invaded Poland on 1 September 1939, its armoured corps was composed of 1,445 Panzer Is, 1,223 Panzer IIs, 98 Panzer IIIs and 211 Panzer IVs; the more modern vehicles amounted to less than 10% of Germany's armoured strength. The 1st Panzer Division had a roughly equal balance of types, with 17 Panzer Is, 18 Panzer IIs, 28 Panzer IIIs, and 14 Panzer IVs per battalion. The remaining panzer divisions were heavy with obsolete models, equipped as they were with 34 Panzer Is, 33 Panzer IIs, 5 Panzer IIIs, and 6 Panzer IVs per battalion. Although the Polish Army possessed less than 200 tanks capable of penetrating the German light tanks, Polish anti-tank guns proved more of a threat, reinforcing German faith in the value of the close-support Panzer IV.

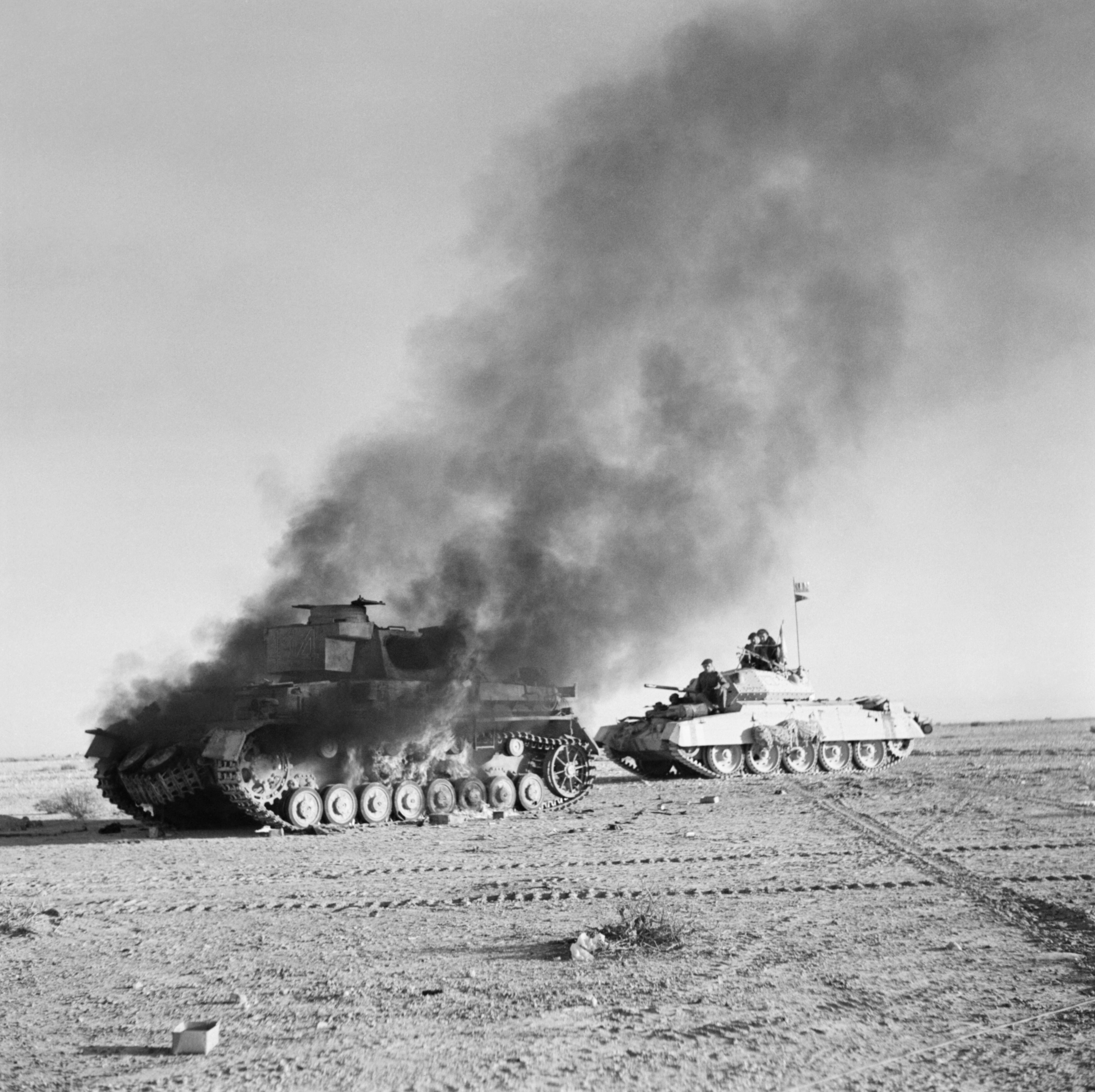
A British Crusader tank passing a burning German Panzer IV during Operation Crusader, late 1941

Despite increased production of the medium Panzer IIIs and IVs prior to the German invasion of France on 10 May 1940, the majority of German tanks were still light types. According to Heinz Guderian, the Wehrmacht invaded France with 523 Panzer Is, 955 Panzer IIs, 349 Panzer IIIs, 278 Panzer IVs, 106 Panzer 35(t)s and 228 Panzer 38(t)s. Through the use of tactical radios and superior tactics, as well as greater mobility generally, the Germans were able to outmaneuver and defeat French and British armour. However, Panzer IVs armed with the KwK 37 L/24 75-millimetre (2.95 in) tank gun found it difficult to engage French tanks such as the Somua S35 and Char B1.

Although the Panzer IV was deployed to North Africa with the German Afrika Korps, until the longer gun variant began production, the tank was outperformed by the Panzer III with respect to armour penetration. Both the Panzer III and IV had difficulty in penetrating the British Matilda II's thick armour, while the Matilda's 40-mm QF 2 pounder gun could knock out either German tank; the Matilda II's major disadvantage was its low speed. By August 1942, Rommel had only received 27 Panzer IV Ausf. F2s, armed with the L/43 gun, which he deployed to spearhead his armoured offensives. The longer gun could penetrate all American and British tanks in theater at ranges of up to 1,500 m (4,900 ft), by that time the most heavily armoured of which was the M3 Grant. Although more of these tanks arrived in North Africa between August and October 1942, their numbers were insignificant compared to the amount of matériel shipped to British forces.

The Panzer IV also took part in the invasions of Yugoslavia and Greece in early 1941.

=== Eastern Front (1941–1945) ===
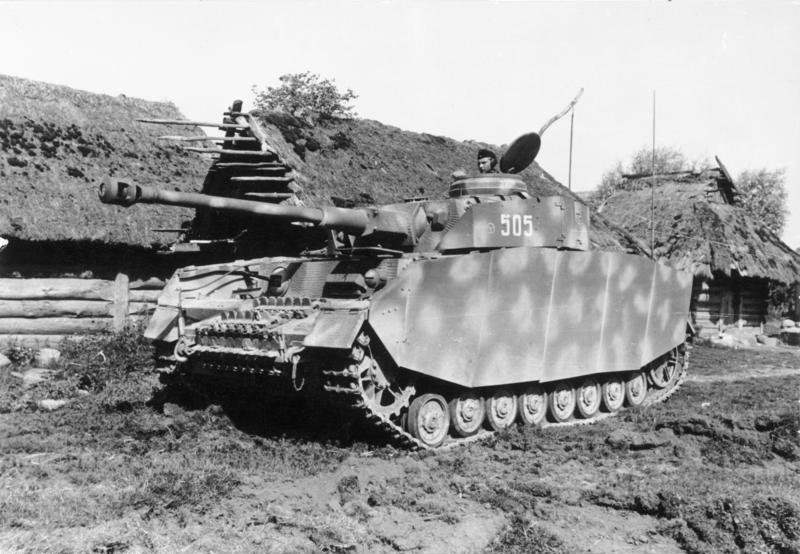
A PzKpfw IV Ausf. H of the 12th Panzer Division carrying Schürzen skirting operating on the Eastern Front in the USSR, 1944

With the launching of Operation Barbarossa on 22 June 1941, the unanticipated appearance of the KV-1 and T-34 tanks prompted an upgrade of the Panzer IV's 75 mm (2.95 in) gun to a longer, high-velocity 75 mm gun suitable for anti-tank use. This meant that it could now penetrate the T-34 at ranges of up to 1,200 m (3,900 ft) at any angle. The 75 mm KwK 40 L/43 gun on the Panzer IV could penetrate a T-34 at a variety of impact angles beyond 1,000 m (3,300 ft) range and up to 1,600 m (5,200 ft). Shipment of the first model to mount the new gun, the Ausf. F2, began in spring 1942, and by the summer offensive there were around 135 Panzer IVs with the L/43 tank gun available. At the time, these were the only German tanks that could defeat T-34 or KV-1 with sheer firepower. They played a crucial role in the events that unfolded between June 1942 and March 1943, and the Panzer IV became the mainstay of the German panzer divisions. Although in service by late September 1942, the Tiger I was not yet numerous enough to make an impact and suffered from serious teething problems, while the Panther was not delivered to German units in the Soviet Union until May 1943. The extent of German reliance on the Panzer IV during this period is reflected by their losses; 502 were destroyed on the Eastern Front in 1942.

The Panzer IV continued to play an important role during operations in 1943, including at the Battle of Kursk. Newer types, such as the Panther, were still experiencing crippling reliability problems that restricted their combat efficiency, so much of the effort fell to the 841 Panzer IVs that took part in the battle. Throughout 1943, the German army lost 2,352 Panzer IVs on the Eastern Front; some divisions were reduced to 12–18 tanks by the end of the year. In 1944, a further 2,643 Panzer IVs were destroyed, and such losses were becoming increasingly difficult to replace. Nevertheless, due to a shortage of replacement Panther tanks, the Panzer IV continued to form the core of Germany's armoured divisions, including elite units such as the II SS Panzer Corps, through 1944.

In January 1945, 287 Panzer IVs were lost on the Eastern Front. It is estimated that combat against Soviet forces accounted for 6,153 Panzer IVs, or about 75% of all Panzer IV losses during the war.

=== Western Front (1944–1945) ===
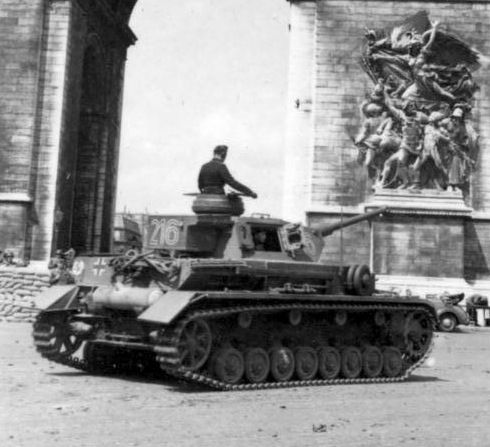
A Panzer IV Ausf. G of the 1st SS Panzer Division "Leibstandarte SS Adolf Hitler" near the Arc de Triomphe in Paris, 1942.

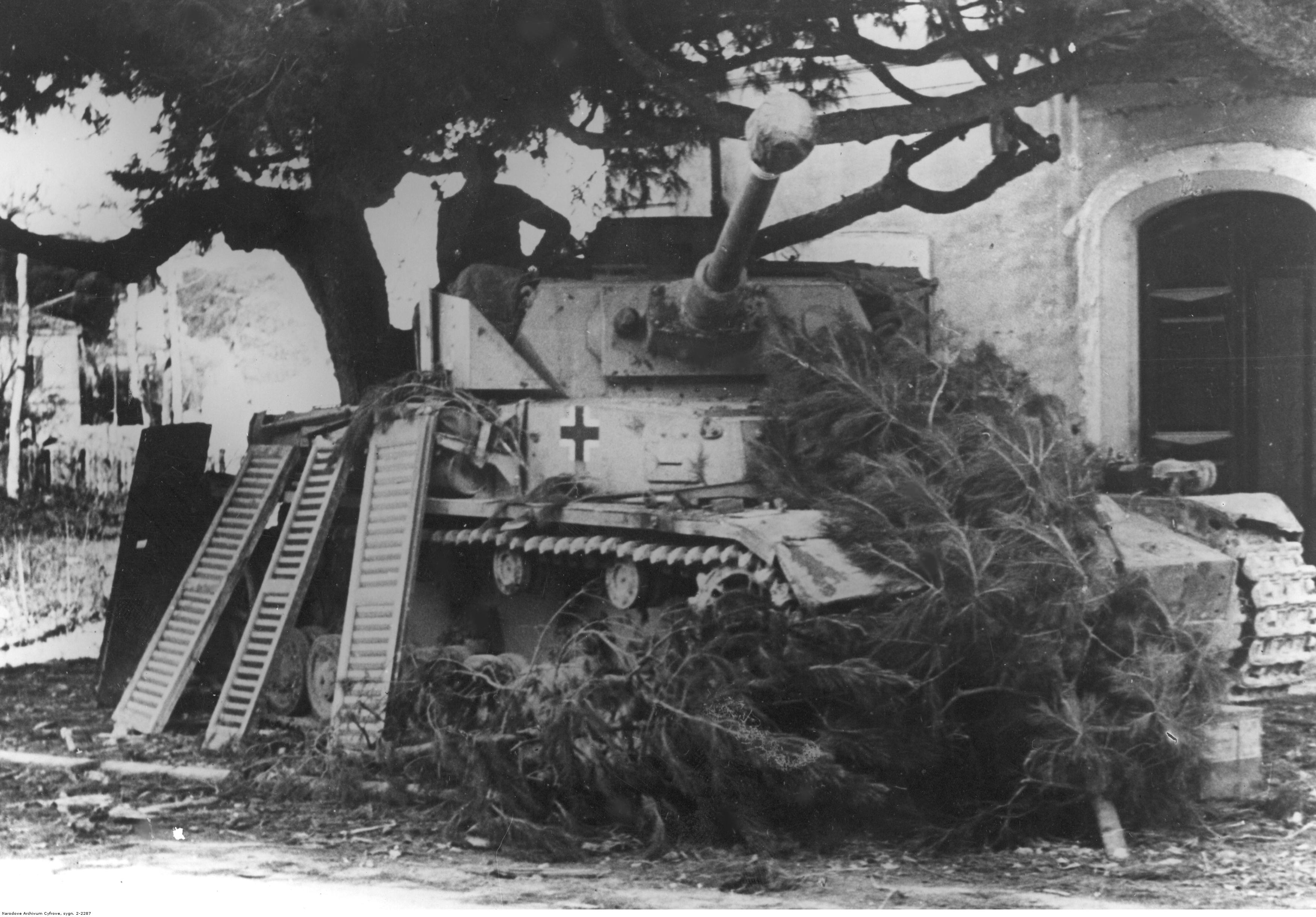
A camouflaged Panzer IV Ausf. H under the canopy of a tree in the Italian sector of the front, 1944.

Panzer IVs comprised around half of the available German tank strength on the Western Front prior to the Allied invasion of Normandy on 6 June 1944. Most of the 11 Panzer divisions that saw action in Normandy initially contained an armoured regiment of one battalion of Panzer IVs and another of Panthers, for a total of around 160 tanks, although Waffen-SS Panzer divisions were generally larger and better equipped than their Heer counterparts. Regular upgrades to the Panzer IV had helped to maintain its reputation as a formidable opponent. The bocage countryside in Normandy favoured defense, and German tanks and anti-tank guns inflicted very heavy casualties on Allied armour during the Normandy campaign, despite the overwhelming Allied air superiority. German counter-attacks were blunted in the face of Allied artillery, infantry-held anti-tank weapons, tank destroyers and anti-tank guns, as well as the ubiquitous fighter-bomber aircraft. The side skirt armour could predetonate shaped charge anti-tank weapons such as the British PIAT, but could be pulled away by rugged terrain. German tankers in all theaters were "frustrated by the way these skirts were easily torn off when going through dense brush".

The Allies had also been improving their tanks; the widely used American-designed M4 Sherman medium tank, while mechanically reliable, repairable, and available in large numbers, suffered from an inadequate gun in terms of armour-piercing. Against earlier-model Panzer IVs, it could hold its own, but with its 75 mm M3 gun, struggled against the late-model Panzer IV. The late-model Panzer IV's 80 mm (3.15 in) frontal hull armour could easily withstand hits from the 75 mm (2.95 in) weapon on the Sherman at normal combat ranges, though the turret remained vulnerable.

The British up-gunned the Sherman with their highly effective 76 mm QF 17-pounder anti-tank gun, resulting in the Firefly; although this was the only Allied tank capable of dealing with all current German tanks at normal combat ranges, few (342) were available in time for the Normandy invasion. One Sherman in every British troop of four was a Firefly. By the end of the Normandy campaign, a further 550 Fireflies were built. which was enough to make good any losses. A second British tank equipped with the 17-pdr gun, the Cruiser Mk VIII Challenger, could not participate in the initial landings having to wait for port facilities to be ready to land. It was not until July 1944 that American Shermans fitted with the 76 mm gun M1 gun achieved a parity in firepower with the Panzer IV.

By 29 August 1944, as the last surviving German troops of Fifth Panzer Army and Seventh Army began retreating towards Germany, the twin cataclysms of the Falaise Pocket and the Seine crossing cost the Wehrmacht dearly. Of the 2,300 tanks and assault guns it had committed to Normandy (including around 750 Panzer IVs), over 2,200 had been lost. Field Marshal Walter Model reported to Hitler that his panzer divisions had remaining, on average, five or six tanks each.

During the winter of 1944–45, the Panzer IV was one of the most numerous tanks in the Ardennes offensive, where further heavy losses—as often due to fuel shortages as to enemy action—impaired major German armoured operations in the West thereafter. The Panzer IVs that took part were survivors of the battles in France between June and September 1944, with around 260 additional Panzer IV Ausf. Js issued as reinforcements.

=== Other users ===
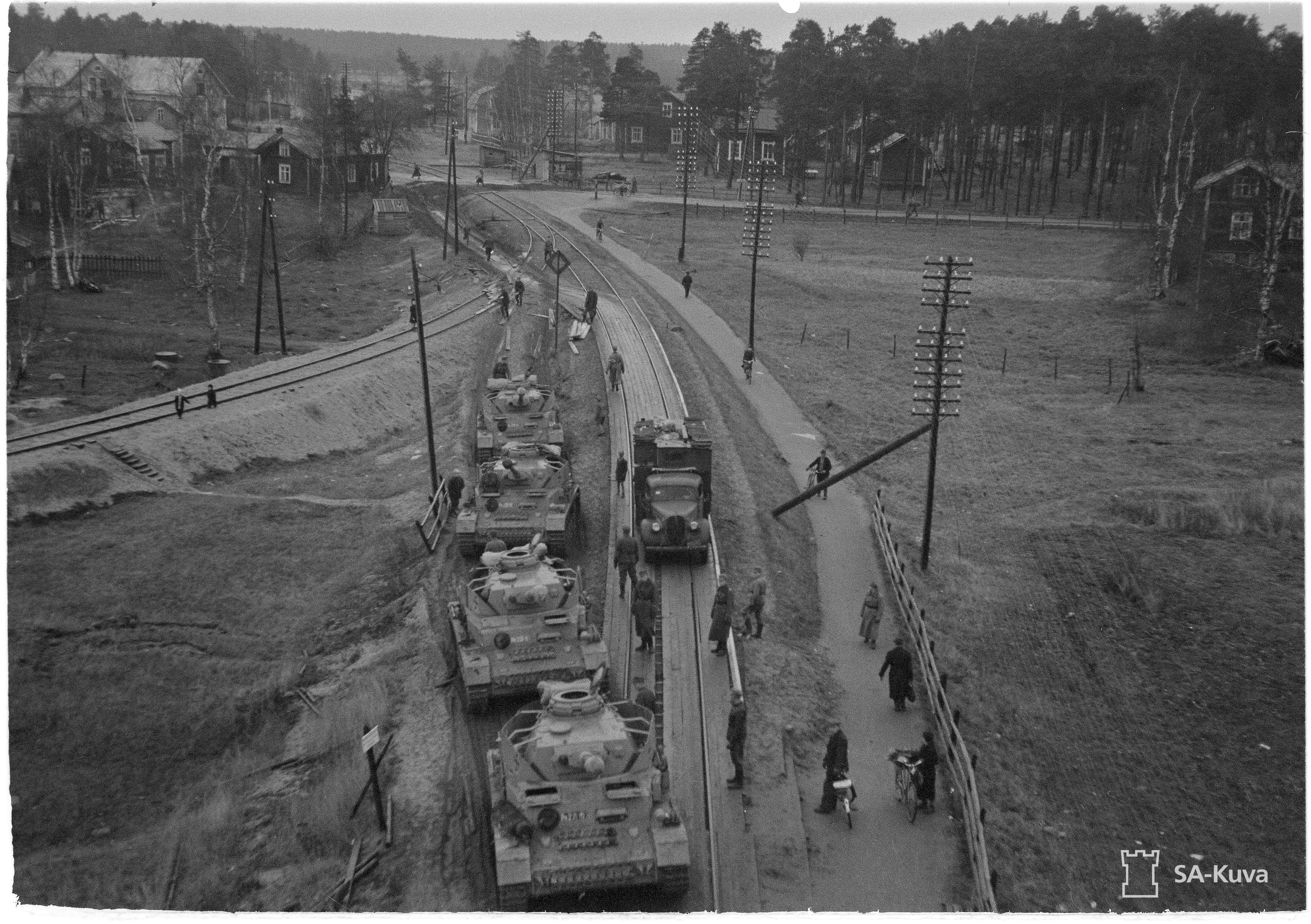
Column of Finnish Panzer IV Ausf. J at Tuira, Oulu, Finland, in November 1944

==== Finland ====
Finland bought 15 new Panzer IV Ausf. Js in 1944. The remainder of an order for 40 tanks and some StuG IIIs were not delivered and neither were necessary German tank instructors provided. The tanks arrived too late to see action against the Soviet Union but instead ended up being used against Nazi Germany during their withdrawal through Lapland. After the war, they served as training tanks and one portrayed a Soviet KV-1 tank in the movie The Unknown Soldier in 1955. The additional weight, going from the 18.4 tons (Ausf. A) to about 25 tons (Ausf. J), of these modifications strained the simple leaf spring suspension. As a result, the Finnish Army often referred to the PzKpfw IV Ausf.J as the "shaker" for its rough ride, when compared to their StuG IIIs that, by comparison, had the much better torsion-bar suspension of the PzKpfw III. According to the Finnish, this not only affected general crew comfort, but also hampered the accurate aiming of the main gun whilst on the move. What exactly caused these "vibrations" that gave the PzKw IV Ausf. J such a bad name among Finnish tank crews remains somewhat unclear as it isn't mentioned in any German or Allied descriptions, but the inadequate leaf spring suspension and comparison with the very smooth ride of the StuG III seems to be the most likely cause.

==== Bulgaria ====
After 1945, Bulgaria incorporated its surviving Panzer IVs into defensive bunkers as strongpoints along its border with Turkey, along with Soviet T-34 turrets. This defensive line, known as the "Krali Marko Line", remained in use until the fall of communism in 1989.

==== Spain ====
Twenty Panzer IV Ausf. Hs and ten StuG III Ausf. Gs were supplied to Spain in December 1943, a small fraction of what Spain had originally asked for. The Panzer IV represented the best tank in Spanish service between 1944 and 1954, and was deployed along with T-26s and Panzer Is. Spain sold 17 Panzer IVs to Syria in 1967, with the remaining three left conserved. These can be found in Madrid, Burgos and Santovenia de Pisuerga (Valladolid).

==== Romania ====
Most of the tanks Romania had received were lost during combat between 1944 and 1945. These tanks, designated T4 in the army's inventory, were used by the Army's 2nd Armoured Regiment. On 9 May 1945, only two Panzer IVs were left. Romania received another 50 captured Panzer IV tanks from the Red Army after the end of the war. These tanks were of many different models and were in very bad shape—many of them were missing parts and the side-skirts. These German T4 tanks remained in service until 1950, when the Army decided to use only Soviet equipment. By 1954, all German tanks in Romanian military service had been scrapped.

==== Syria ====
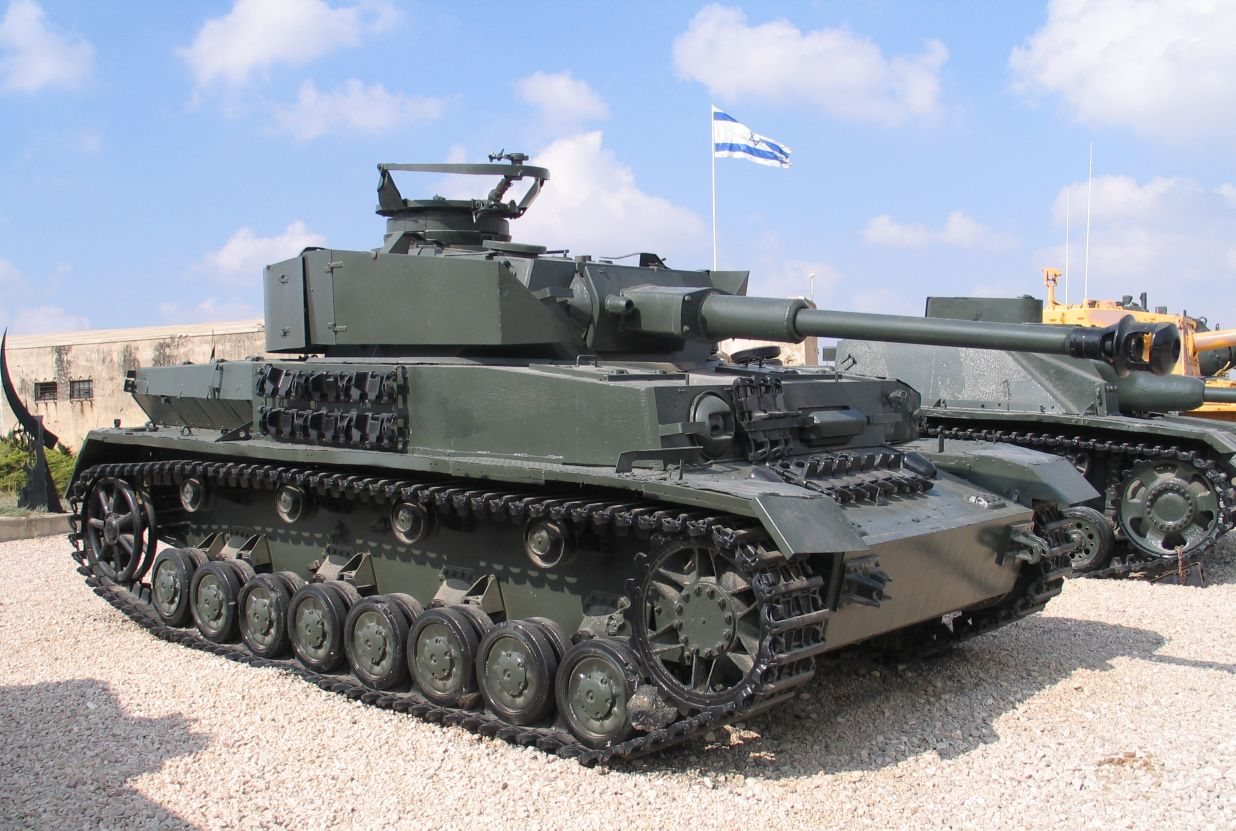
An ex-Syrian Panzer IV at Yad La-Shiryon. Note the machine gun mount on the commander cupola.

While their numbers remain uncertain, Syria received around 60 Panzers that were refurbished in France between 1950 and 1952, followed by 50 others purchased from Czechoslovakia in 1954, per the Czechoslovakia-Syria arms deal. A Soviet 12.7mm DShK machine gun on an anti-aircraft mount was retrofitted on the cupola. These ex-German tanks were used to shell Israeli settlements below the Golan Heights, together with Soviet-supplied T-34s, and were fired upon in 1965 during the Water War by Israeli Super Sherman and Centurion tanks. Syria received 17 Panzer IVs from Spain, with these seeing combat during the Six-Day War in 1967. Panzer IVs also participated in 1973 Yom Kippur War, with some dug in as pillboxes. Several of Syria's Panzer IVs were captured by the Israeli Army and donated to the Yad La-Shiryon museum, which later traded an Ausf H from this collection to the American Armored Foundation Tank Museum in Danville, Virginia in exchange for an M5 Stuart.

==== Turkey ====
In addition, Turkey was a buyer, with 35 Panzer IVs received until 4 May 1944 in exchange for some chromium ore. Delivery began with the Ausf. G and probably went on with Ausf. H versions. Other sources state only 15 to 22 tanks were delivered in 1943, all of the Ausf G version.

==== Ukraine ====
In 2023, during the Russo-Ukrainian War, the wreckage of a Panzer IV, likely a former Syrian Army example, was discovered near Kreminna by Russian forces. The tank was fitted with BMP-2 treads and was used as either an improvised APC or a decoy for Russian drones. The vehicle had been disabled by either a landmine or a drone.

=== Captured Panzer IVs in service ===
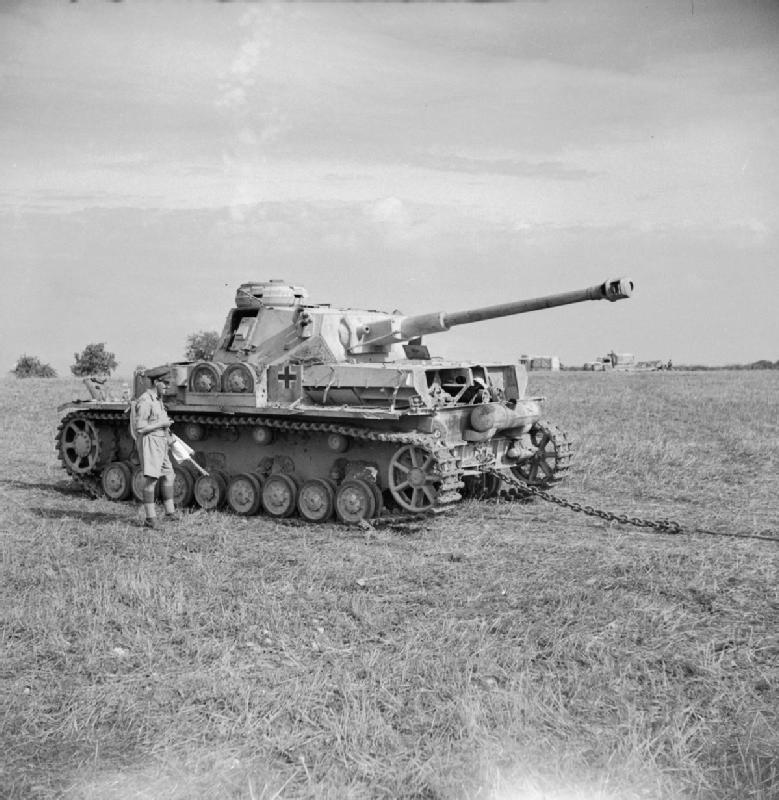
A captured German Pz.Kpfw. IV Ausf. G used for anti-tank weapons testing by the British Eighth Army in Italy in 1943

The Soviet Army captured significant numbers of German armoured vehicles, including Panzer IVs (its Russian designation was "T-4"). Some of them were pressed into temporary service and others were used for driver or anti-tank training. Sometimes, captured tanks were used in different temporary units or as single tanks. While captured Tiger I/IIs and Panthers were only permitted to be used until they irrecoverably broke down, the simplicity of the Panzer IV and the large number of captured parts allowed for long-term repair and continued use.

At least one captured Panzer IV Ausf. H was used by the Warsaw Tank Brigade of the Polish 2nd Corps in Italy during 1944. One Panzer IV Ausf. J was used by the 5th Independent Armored Artillery Division from 1945.

In December 1944 , the 1st GMR (Groupement Mobile de Reconnaissance) of the French Forces of the Interior (FFI), later called 'Escadron Autonome de Chars Besnier', was equipped with at least one Panzer IV.

== Variants ==
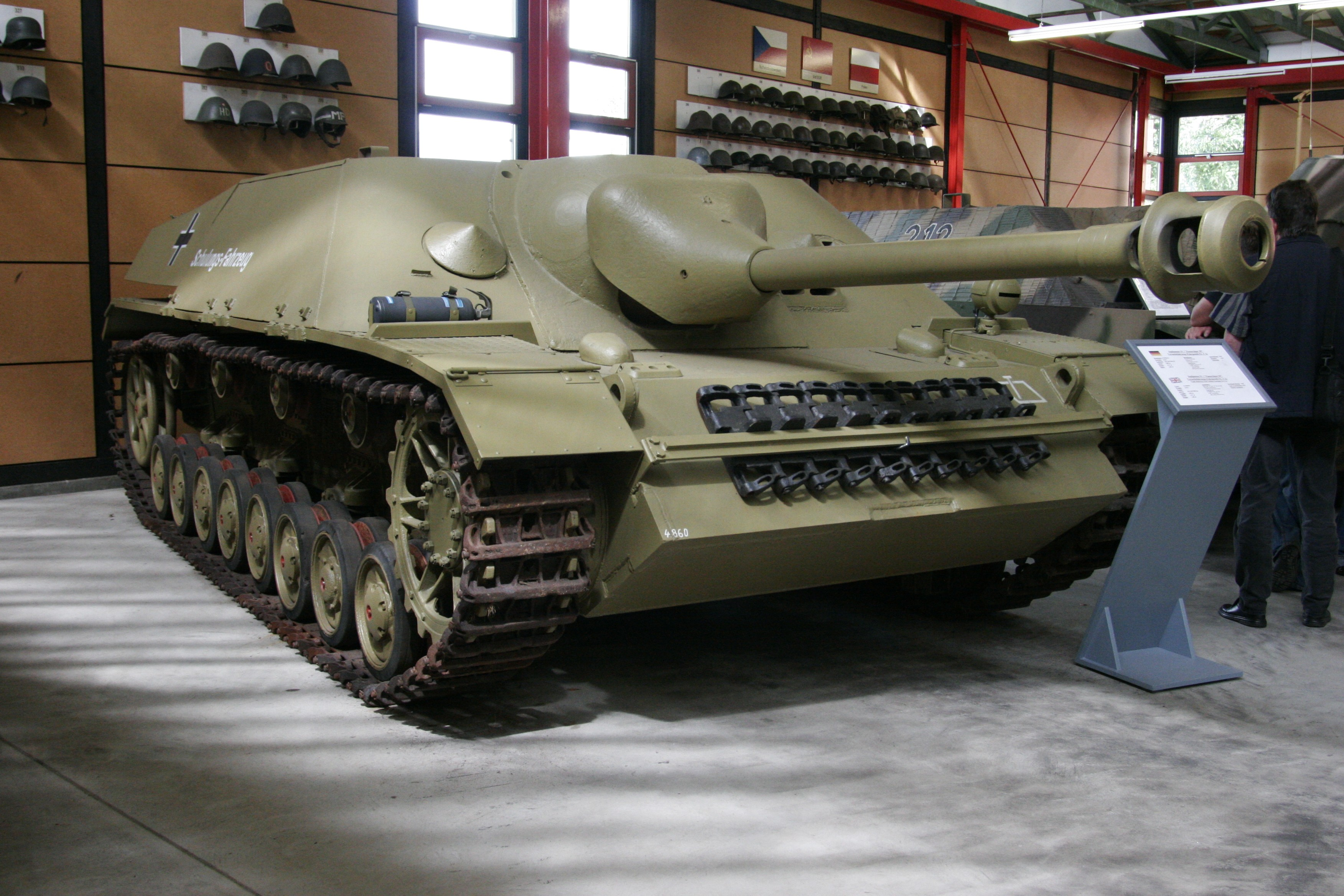
The Jagdpanzer IV tank destroyer was based on the Panzer IV chassis mounting the 75 mm Pak L/48 anti-tank gun

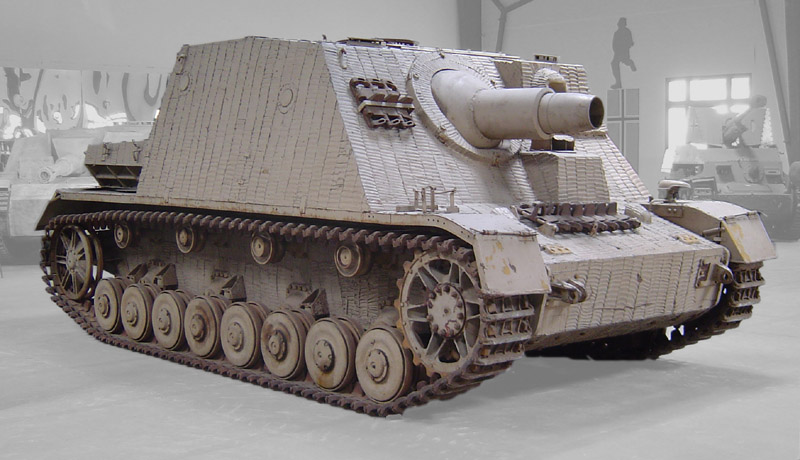
A Sturmpanzer IV infantry-support gun

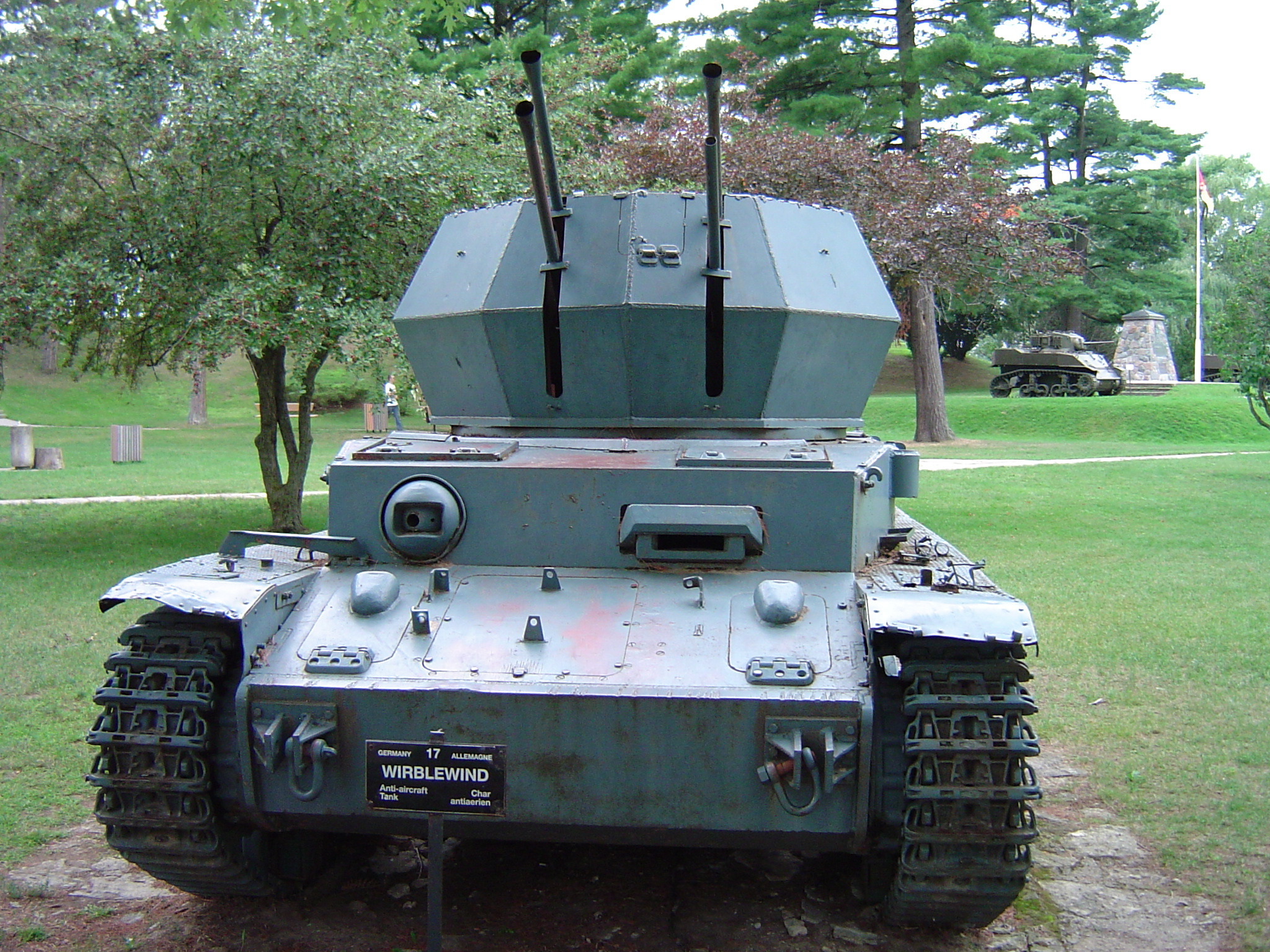
The Wirbelwind self-propelled anti-aircraft gun located at CFB Borden

In keeping with the wartime German design expediency of mounting an existing anti-tank gun on a convenient chassis to give mobility, several tank destroyers and infantry support guns were built around the Panzer IV hull. Both the Jagdpanzer IV, initially armed with the 75 mm (2.95 in) L/48 tank gun, and the Krupp-manufactured Sturmgeschütz IV, which was the casemate of the Sturmgeschütz III mounted on the body of the Panzer IV, proved highly effective in defense. Cheaper and faster to construct than tanks, but with the disadvantage of a very limited gun traverse, around 1,980 Jagdpanzer IVs and 1,140 Sturmgeschütz IVs were produced. Another tank destroyer, the Panzer IV/70, used the same basic 75-mm L/70 gun that was mounted on the Panther.

The Panzerbefehlswagen IV (Pz. Bef. Wg. IV) was a command tank. This conversion entailed the installation of additional radio sets with associated mounting racks, transformers, junction boxes, wiring, antennas and an auxiliary electrical generator. To make room for the new equipment, ammunition stowage was reduced from 87 to 72 rounds. The vehicle could coordinate with nearby armour, infantry or even aircraft. Seventeen Panzerbefehlswagen were built on Ausf. J chassis in August and September 1944, while another 88 were based on refurbished chassis.

The Panzerbeobachtungswagen IV (Pz. Beob. Wg. IV) was an artillery observation vehicle built on the Panzer IV chassis. This, too, received new radio equipment and an electrical generator, installed in the left rear corner of the fighting compartment. Panzerbeobachtungswagen worked in cooperation with Wespe and Hummel self-propelled artillery batteries.

The Sturmpanzer IV (called "Brummbär" by Allied intelligence) with a short barreled 15 cm (5.91 in) StuH 43 gun was an infantry-support self-propelled gun. These vehicles were primarily issued to four Sturmpanzer units (Numbers 216, 217, 218 and 219) and used during the battle of Kursk and in Italy in 1943. Two separate versions of the Sturmpanzer IV existed, one without a machine gun in the mantlet and one with a machine gun mounted on the mantlet of the casemate. Furthermore, a 105 mm (4.13 in) artillery gun was mounted in an experimental demountable turret on a Panzer IV chassis. This variant was called the Heuschrecke ("grasshopper"). Another 105 mm artillery/anti-tank prototype was the 10.5 cm K gepanzerte Selbstfahrlafette, nicknamed Dicker Max, made in two examples, both used in the Eastern Front. One caught fire, and the other one fought with success during Operation Barbarossa and Operation Blue; during Operation Blue, it fought in the Battle of Stalingrad.

Four different self-propelled anti-aircraft vehicles were built on the Panzer IV hull. The Flakpanzer IV "Möbelwagen" ("moving van") was armed with a 37 mm (1.46 in) anti-aircraft cannon; 240 were built between 1944 and 1945. In late 1944 a new Flakpanzer, the Wirbelwind ("whirlwind"), was designed, with enough armour to protect the gun's crew in a rotating turret, armed with the quadruple 20 mm Flakvierling anti-aircraft cannon system; at least 100 were manufactured. Sixty-five (out of an order for 100) similar vehicles with a single 37 mm anti-aircraft cannon were built named Ostwind ("East wind"). This vehicle was designed to replace the Wirbelwind. The final model was the Flakpanzer IV Kugelblitz, of which only five pilot vehicles were built. This vehicle featured an enclosed turret armed with twin 30 mm (1.18 in) Rheinmetall-Borsig MK 103 aircraft cannon.

Although not a direct modification of the Panzer IV, some of its components, in conjunction with parts from the Panzer III, were used to make one of the most widely used self-propelled artillery chassis of the war—the Geschützwagen III/IV. This chassis was the basis of the Hummel, of which 666 were built, and also the 88-millimetre (3.46 in) gun-armed Nashorn tank destroyer, with 473 manufactured. To resupply self-propelled howitzers in the field, 150 ammunition carriers were manufactured on the Geschützwagen III/IV chassis.

The Bergepanzer IV was a armoured recovery vehicle. Some were believed to have been converted locally, 21 were converted from hulls returned for repair between October 1944 and January 1945. The conversion involved removing the turret and adding a wooden plank cover with an access hatch over the turret ring and the addition of a 2-ton jib crane and rigid towing bars.

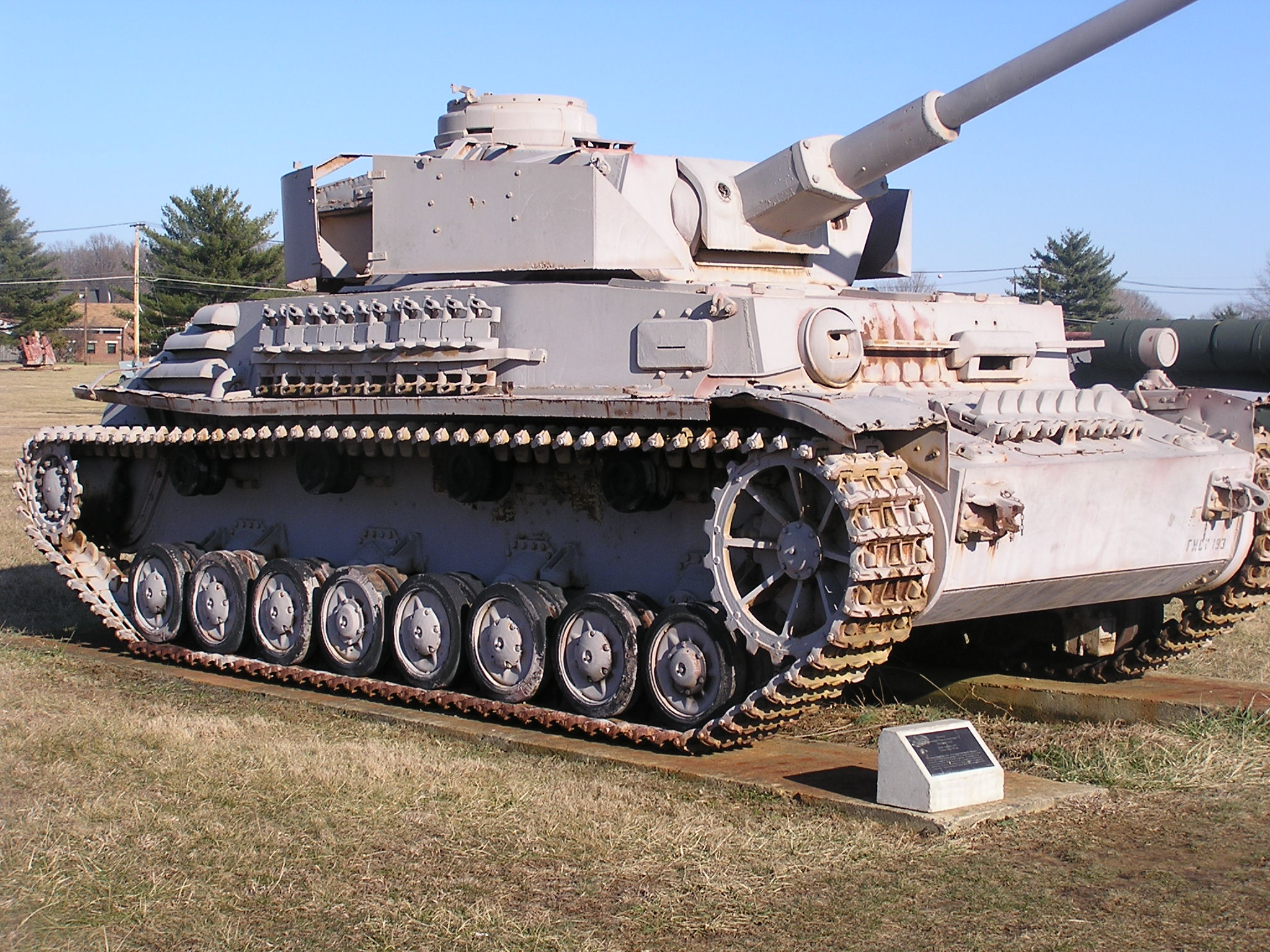
Panzer IV with hydraulic transmission

A rare variant was the Panzer IV mit hydrostatischem Antrieb. In 1944, Zahnradfabrik (ZF) Augsburg plant produced a prototype with an unusual drive concept. A Panzer IV Ausf. H tank received a fluid drive instead of the normal gearbox. Two oil pumps were installed behind the engine, which in turn drove two oil engines. An axial engine drive transmitted the power to the rear drive wheels via a reduction gear. Instead of the two steering levers, the driver had a crescent-shaped steering wheel with the steering movements of which two steering cylinders were operated, which in turn regulated the volume of the oil pumps and thus regulated the adjacent force on the two drive wheels. The only prototype built was not used and was shipped to America after the war to be subjected to driving tests. These finally had to be discontinued due to a lack of spare parts. The only surviving vehicle is now in United States Army Ordnance Training and Heritage Center in Virginia.

=== Production models ===
Production models of Panzer IV
Name	Production details
Ausf.A, 1/BW (Sd.Kfz.161)	35 produced by Krupp-Gruson, between November 1937 and June 1938.
Ausf.B, 2/BW	42 produced by Krupp-Gruson, from May to October 1938.
Ausf.C, 3/BW	140 produced by Krupp-Gruson, from October 1938 to August 1939.
Ausf.D, 4/BW + 5/BW	200 + 48 produced by Krupp-Gruson, from October 1939 to October 1940.
Ausf.E, 6/BW	206 produced by Krupp-Gruson, from October 1940 to April 1941.
Ausf.F, 7/BW	471 produced by Krupp-Gruson, Vomag and Nibelungenwerke from April 1941 to March 1942.
Ausf.F2, 7/BW Umbau (Sd.Kfz.161/1)	Temporary designation for Ausf F chassis built with long 7.5 cm KwK 40 L/43 main gun, later renamed into Ausf. G and 8/BW.
Ausf.G, 8/BW	1,927 produced by Krupp-Gruson, Vomag and Nibelungenwerke from March 1942 to June 1943.
Ausf.H, 9/BW (Sd.Kfz.161/2)	~2,324 produced by Krupp-Gruson, Vomag and Nibelungenwerke from June 1943 to February 1944.
Ausf.J, 10/BW	~3,160 produced by Nibelungenwerke and Vomag from February 1944 to April 1945.

=== Variants based on chassis ===
Derivatives of Panzer IV
Name	Production details
Tauchpanzer IV	42 converted from July 1940 as submersible medium support tanks
Panzerbefehlswagen	Command tank with additional radio equipment, 17 built on Ausf. J and further 88 on rebuilt chassis
Panzerbeobachtungswagen IV	Artillery spotter tank with special radio equipment, 133 converted from Ausf. J
Sturmpanzer IV	Heavy Assault gun armed with 150 mm Infantry gun
Sturmgeschütz IV	Assault gun, similar to StuG III, armed with 7.5 cm gun
Jagdpanzer IV and Panzer IV/70	Tank destroyer armed with 7.5 cm gun
Nashorn	Heavy Panzerjäger armed with 8.8 cm Anti-tank gun
Hummel	Self-propelled artillery armed with 150 mm Howitzer
Flakpanzer IV	Multiple variants of Panzer IV chassis armed with various Flak guns, including the Wirbelwind, Ostwind, and Kugelblitz
Brückenleger IV b+c	20+4 bridge layer tanks built by Krupp and Magirus, on Ausf.C and Ausf.D chassis, from February to May 1940
Brückenleger IV s (Sturmstegpanzer)	4 assault bridge carriers converted from Ausf.C chassis in 1940
Bergepanzer IV	21 armoured recovery vehicles converted from Pz IV chassis from October to December 1944
Panzer IV mit hydrostatischem Antrieb	1 Panzer IV Ausf. H with a hydraulic drive by Zahnradfabrik in 1944
Munitionsschlepper IV	22 Ausf. D, E and F chassis tanks modified to supply & load Karl-Gerät weapons with ammunition.

== See also ==
- List of military vehicles of World War II
- List of World War II military vehicles of Germany
- List of Sd.Kfz. designations
- Panzer III/IV

Tanks of comparable role, performance and era

- British Cavalier and Cromwell
- Canadian Ram II (up to Ausf. G variant)
- Canadian Grizzly I - Canadian built Sherman
- Hungarian Turán III
- Italian Carro Armato P 40
- Japanese Type 2 Ho-I (up to Ausf. D variant)
- Japanese Type 1 Chi-He (up to Ausf. E variant)
- Japanese Type 3 Chi-Nu
- Romanian 1942 medium tank (proposal)
- Soviet T-28 (up to Ausf. D variant)
- Soviet T-34
- Swedish Stridsvagn m/42
- United States M3 Lee
- United States M4 Sherman
