= List of infantry support guns =

Infantry support guns are designed to provide direct organic support for infantry forces. They fire a range of shells, primarily in a direct fire mode.

== Towed infantry guns ==
Most towed infantry guns are lightweight and capable of being manhandled for limited mobility to accompany infantry.

Caliber (mm)	Weapon name	Country of origin	Period
37	Krupp 3.7 cm trench gun	German Empire	World War I
37	3.7 cm Infanteriegeschütz M.15	Austria-Hungary	World War I/World War II
37	Canon d'Infanterie de 37 modèle 1916 TRP	France	World War I
37	Type 11 infantry gun	Japan	World War II
37	37-mm trench gun M1915	Russian Empire	World War I
37	37 mm McClean Automatic Cannon Mk. III	United States	World War I
37	37 mm Infantry Gun Model 1917	United States	World War I
38.1	Hughes breech-loading cannon	Confederate States of America	American Civil War
40	1.59 inch Breech-Loading Vickers Q.F. Gun, Mk II	United Kingdom	World War I
53	5.3 cm Fahrpanzer	German Empire	World War I
57	5.7 cm Maxim-Nordenfelt	United Kingdom	World War I
60	6 cm S-Bts K L/21	German Empire	World War I
75	Bofors 75 mm L/20 & L/22	Sweden	Interwar
75	leIG 18	Nazi Germany	World War II
75	leIG 18 F	Nazi Germany	World War II
75	7.5 cm Infanteriegeschütz 37	Nazi Germany	World War II
75	7.5 cm Infanteriegeschütz 42	Nazi Germany	World War II
76	76 mm Canon de 76 Fonderie Royale des Canons	Belgium	Interwar/World War II
76.2	76 mm counter-assault gun Model 1910	Russian Empire	World War I
76.2	76 mm infantry gun Model 1913	Russian Empire	World War I
76.2	76 mm regimental gun M1927	Soviet Union	World War II
76.2	76 mm regimental gun M1943	Soviet Union	World War II
76.2	7.62 cm Infanteriegeschütz L/16.5	German Empire	World War I
76.2	Cannone da 76/17 S modello 12	Kingdom of Italy	World War I
77	7.7 cm Infanteriegeschütz L/20	German Empire	World War I
77	7.7 cm Infanteriegeschütz L/27	German Empire	World War I
150	15 cm sIG 33	Nazi Germany	World War II
152	152 mm mortar M1931 (NM)	Soviet Union	World War II

== Self-propelled infantry guns ==
A self-propelled infantry gun (assault gun) is an armored gun-armed vehicle designed to provide direct fire support for infantry and armored forces. Typically, the gun is mounted in the hull and the front of the vehicle is heavily armored.

Caliber (mm)	Weapon name	Country of origin	Period
57	ASU-57	Soviet Union	Cold War (1951)
75	StuG III	Nazi Germany	World War II
75	StuG IV	Nazi Germany	World War II
75	Semovente 75/18	Italy	World War II
75	Semovente 75/34	Italy	World War II
75	Semovente 75/46	Italy	World War II
76	Rooikat 76	South Africa	modern
76.2	SU-76	Soviet Union	World War II (1942)
76.2	SU-76i	Soviet Union	World War II (1943)
85	ASU-85	Soviet Union	Cold War
90	Semovente 90/53	Italy	World War II
94	Tank, Heavy Assault, Tortoise (A39)	United Kingdom	World War II
105	StuH 42	Nazi Germany	World War II
105	Semovente 105/25	Italy	World War II
114	BT-42	Finland	World War II
122	SU-122	Soviet Union	World War II
122	ISU-122	Soviet Union	World War II (1943)
150	Sturmpanzer IV	Nazi Germany	World War II
150	15 cm sIG 33 (Sf) auf Panzerkampfwagen I	Nazi Germany	World War II
150	15 cm sIG 33 auf Fahrgestell Panzerkampfwagen II	Nazi Germany	World War II
150	15 cm sIG 33/1 on Panzer III chassis	Nazi Germany	World War II
150	15 cm sIG 33 (Sf) auf Panzerkampfwagen 38(t)	Nazi Germany	World War II
152	SU-152	Soviet Union	World War II (1943)
152	SU-152G	Soviet Union	Cold War
152	ISU-152	Soviet Union	World War II
152	Object 704	Soviet Union	World War II
152	Object 120	Soviet Union	Cold War
