= SIG 33 Self-Propelled Artillery =

sIG 33 Self-propelled Artillery
- Type: Self-propelled artillery
- Place of origin: Nazi Germany

Service history
- In service: 1940-1945
- Used by: Germany
- Wars: World War II

Production history
- Produced: 1939–1944
- No. built: 370

The German sIG 33 heavy infantry gun was mounted on a number of vehicles to produce a self-propelled gun. The first appeared in 1940, and improved versions were still in production in 1944.

== Guns ==
The early vehicles used ordinary sIG 33s, but an sIG 33/1 was developed for use on later vehicles. The 15 cm Sturmhaubitze 43 gun used on the Sturmpanzer IV was an entirely new design developed by Skoda that used the same ammunition as the sIG 33.

Vehicle	Chassis	Gun
15 cm sIG 33 (Sf) auf Panzerkampfwagen I Ausf B	Panzer I Ausf. B	sIG 33
15 cm sIG 33 auf Fahrgestell Panzerkampfwagen II (Sf)	Panzer II (modified chassis)	sIG 33
Sturm-Infanteriegeschütz 33B	Sturmgeschütz III Ausf. B, C, D and E	sIG 33/1
15 cm sIG 33 (Sf) auf Panzerkampfwagen 38(t)	Panzer 38(t) (modified chassis)	sIG 33/1
15 cm Schweres Infanteriegeschütz 33/2 (Sf) auf Jagdpanzer 38	Hetzer (modified chassis)	sIG 33/2
