= Type 4 Ho-Ro =

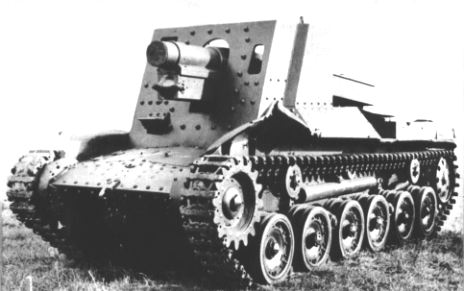
- Type 4 Ho-Ro self-propelled gun
- Type: Self-propelled artillery
- Place of origin: Empire of Japan

Production history
- Produced: 1944
- No. built: 12

Specifications
- Mass: 16.3 tons
- Length: 5.52 meters (18.1 ft)
- Width: 2.33 meters (7.64 ft)
- Height: 2.36 meters (7.74 ft)
- Crew: 6
- Armor: 12–25mm (0.98in)
- Main armament: 150 mm Type 38 howitzer
- Secondary armament: None
- Engine: Mitsubishi Type 100 air-cooled V-12 diesel 170 Hp (126.8 kW)
- Power/weight: 12.8 hp/ton
- Suspension: bellcrank
- Operational range: 200 kilometers (125 miles)
- Maximum speed: 38 km/h (23.6 mph)

The Type 4 15cm self-propelled gun Ho-Ro (日本語: 四式十五糎自走砲 ホロ, Imperial Japanese Army Type 4 15cm self-propelled gun Ho-Ro) was based on an already existing reinforced Type 97 Chi-Ha medium tank chassis developed by the Imperial Japanese Army in World War II.

== Development ==
Inspired by the Grille series of self-propelled artillery vehicles developed by Nazi Germany during World War II, wherein a 15 cm sIG 33 infantry support gun was mounted on a tracked chassis, engineers at the Army Technical Bureau resolved to do the same. Just like the German Grille, the Ho-Ro was based on an already existing chassis. Production was assigned to Mitsubishi Heavy Industries. According to one estimate, 12 units were completed in 1944.

== Design ==
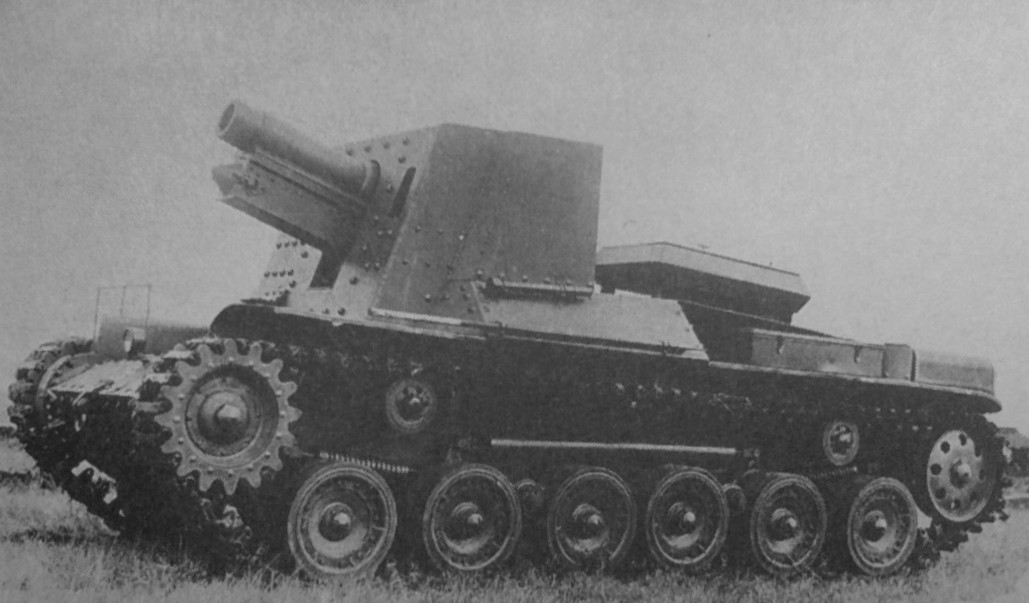
Type 4 15cm self-propelled gun Ho-Ro, side view

The hull selected was a modified Type 97 Chi-Ha medium tank chassis. On to this platform, a Type 38 150 mm howitzer based on a design by the German arms-manufacturer Krupp was mounted, but dated from 1905 and had been withdrawn from service as being obsolete in 1942. The main gun could fire Type 88 APHE rounds and HEAT rounds, if necessary. Given its breech loader, the maximum rate of fire was only 5 rounds per minute. The gun's elevation was restricted to 30 degrees by the construction of the chassis. The restricted elevation meant it was capable of firing a 35 kilogram shell 6,000 meters (6,600 yards). Other design issues included the fact that although the gun crew was protected by a gun shield with armor thickness of 25 mm at the front, the shield with armor thickness of 12 mm only extended a very short distance on the sides; leaving the rest of the sides and back exposed. In addition, the Ho-Ro did not have any secondary armament, such as a machine-gun, making it vulnerable to close combat.

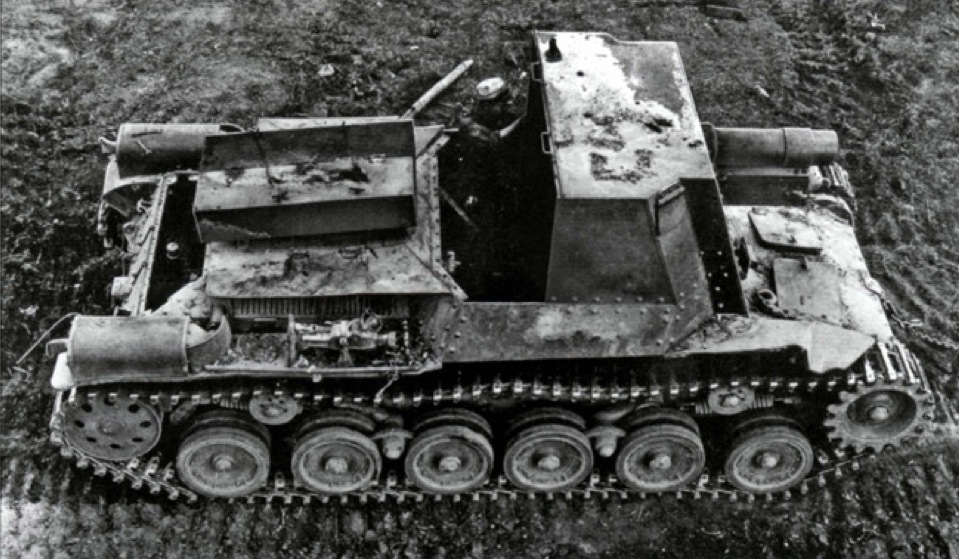
Top-angle view of Type 4 Ho-Ro

== Combat history ==
The Type 4 Ho-Ro was rushed into service, deployed and saw combat as part of the 2nd Tank Division with the Japanese Fourteenth Area Army during the Philippines Campaign in the last year of World War II. Remaining units were deployed to Okinawa in ones and twos for island defense during the Battle of Okinawa, but were severely outnumbered by American artillery.

== Surviving example ==
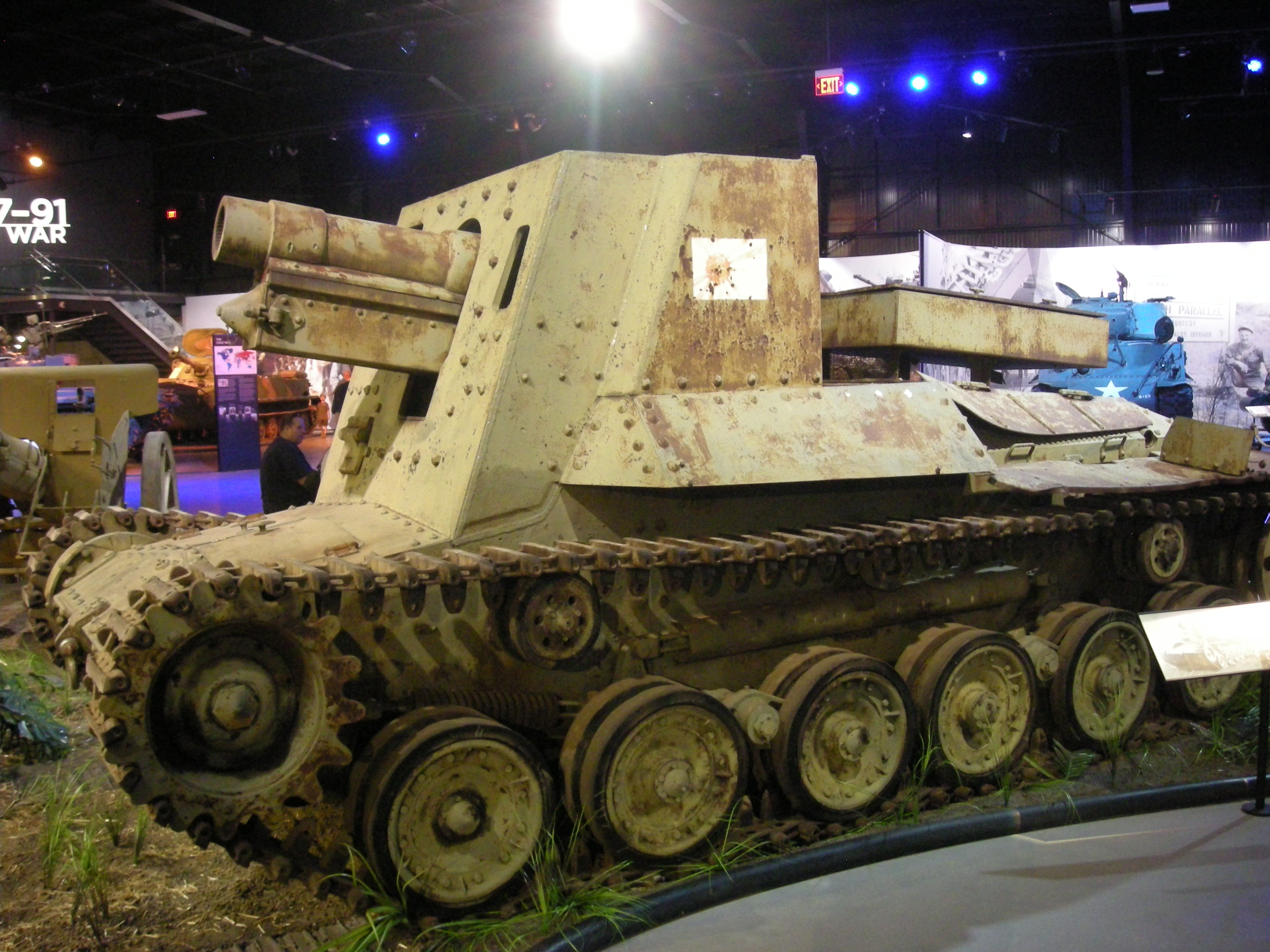
Type 4 Ho-Ro at the American Heritage Museum

The only known surviving example of a Type 4 Ho-Ro is located at the American Heritage Museum in Stow, Massachusetts. It is currently on loan from the National Museum of the Marine Corps and was captured on the island of Luzon in the Philippines.
