= Krupp 3.7 cm trench gun =

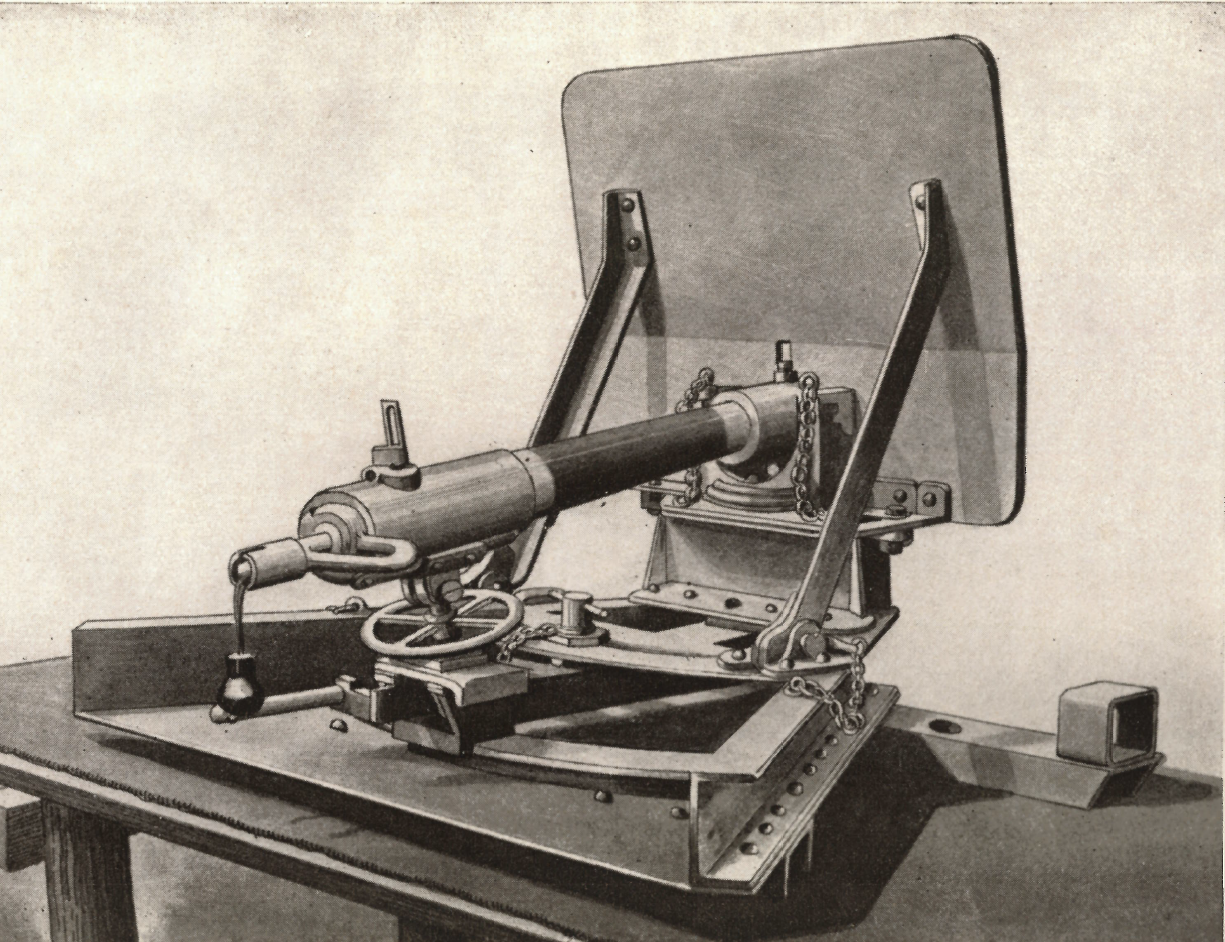
- Type: Infantry gun
- Place of origin: German Empire

Service history
- In service: 1916–1918
- Used by: German Empire
- Wars: World War I

Production history
- Designer: Krupp
- Manufacturer: Krupp

Specifications
- Mass: 168 kg (370 lb)
- Barrel length: 79 cm (2 ft 7 in) L/21.5.
- Shell: 455 g (1 lb)
- Caliber: 37 mm (1.5 in)
- Elevation: -0° to +8°
- Traverse: 22.5°
- Muzzle velocity: 400 m/s (1,300 ft/s)
- Maximum firing range: 1,500 m (1,600 yd) (HE shell)

The Krupp 3.7 cm trench gun was a makeshift German infantry gun used for trench warfare during World War I.

== Development ==
The gun was a direct fire counterpart to the indirect fire Granatenwerfer 16 designed to engage hardened enemy positions, such as machine gun nests, during trench warfare. These positions were often protected with logs, bricks, cement, sandbags, earth, or armored gun shields. The gun was a type of sniper weapon used for loop holing.

== Technical description ==
The barrel was the same as the Hotchkiss 3.7 cm revolver cannon. The earlier Hotchkiss was a multi-barrel Gatling gun that was used for both land and sea warfare. It had 12 grooves and a caliber length of L/21.5.

The base of the gun was made from U-shaped angle iron with two grounding arms. There was a socket for the barrel near the muzzle and two different gun shields were provided. A tall shield could be used when firing from an exposed position or a short shield for firing from enclosed positions. The shields had an armor thickness of 13 mm (0.5 in). The small shield weight 25 kg (55 lb), the large shield 45 kg (99 lb). The shields provided protection against rifle fire and shell splinters.

The barrel pivoted at the front and could be traversed with a handle near the breach. There was also a hand wheel for elevation. Like the 3.7 cm TAK 1918, the Krupp 3.7 cm trench gun used the same barrel, bayonet breech and ball and lanyard trigger. The sighting system consistent of a rear and front sight. The rear sight could be adjusted to a range of 0 to 1,400 m (4,600 ft) at a velocity of 400 m/s (1,300 ft/s). The gun fired a 455 g (1 lb) high explosive projectile with 40 grams (1.4 oz) of explosives and an impact fuse.

== Deployment ==
This gun was issued to infantry gun batteries starting in May of 1916. Each battery had six trench guns, which were later replaced by 3.7 cm assault guns or 7.6 cm guns.

== See also ==
- 3.7 cm TAK 1918
- 3.7 cm Infanteriegeschütz M.15
- Canon d'Infanterie de 37 modèle 1916 TRP
- 37-mm trench gun M1915
- 37 mm McClean Automatic Cannon Mk. III
- 37 mm Infantry Gun Model 1917

== Bibliography ==
- Das Gerät der leichten Artillerie, II. Teil: Infanteriegeschütze, Tankabwehr und Tankbestückung. Bernard & Graefe. 1932.
