= Type 4 15 cm howitzer =

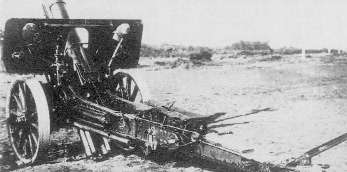
- Type 4 15 cm Howitzer
- Type: heavy howitzer
- Place of origin: Empire of Japan

Service history
- In service: 1915–1949?
- Used by: Imperial Japanese Army; National Revolutionary Army; People's Liberation Army
- Wars: Second Sino-Japanese War; Soviet-Japanese Border Wars; World War II; Chinese Civil War

Production history
- Designer: Osaka Arsenal
- Designed: 1915
- Manufacturer: Osaka Arsenal
- Unit cost: 32,600 yen ($8,760 USD) in August 1939
- No. built: 280

Specifications
- Mass: 2,797 kilograms (6,166 lb) Firing; 2,194.5 kg (4,838 lb) Barrel 2,145 kg (4,729 lb) Cradle Traveling
- Length: 2.59 m (8 ft 6 in) Firing; 8.33 m (27 ft 4 in) Traveling
- Barrel length: 2.169 m (7 ft 1 in) L/14.6
- Width: 1.52 m (5 ft 0 in) Track; 1.88 m (6 ft 2 in) Cradle Maximum
- Height: 1.32 m (4 ft 4 in) Barrel, 2.11 m (6 ft 11 in) Cradle
- Shell: 35.9 kg (79 lb)
- Caliber: 149.1 mm (5.87 in)
- Breech: Vertical sliding-breech block
- Recoil: Hydro-pneumatic
- Carriage: Modified box trail. Wheels and Tires or Iron tires on wooden wheels.
- Elevation: -5° to +65°
- Traverse: 3° left, 3° right
- Rate of fire: 3-4 rounds/minute
- Muzzle velocity: 410 m/s (1,345 ft/s)
- Maximum firing range: 9,575 m (10,471 yd)
- Sights: Panoramic

The Type 4 15 cm Howitzer (四年式十五糎榴弾砲, Yonenshiki Jyūgosenchi Ryudanhō) was a heavy howitzer used by the Imperial Japanese Army during the Second Sino-Japanese War and World War II. The Type 4 designation was given to this gun as it was accepted in the 4th year of Emperor Taishō's reign (1915).

== History and development ==
The Type 4 15 cm Howitzer was designed by the Army’s Osaka Armory to rectify the shortcomings of the Type 38 15 cm howitzer – namely its lack of portability. The Type 96 15 cm Howitzer was intended to replace it, but it remained in use throughout World War II. Weapons captured by the Chinese remained in use at least through the Chinese Civil War. The Type 4 (1915) 150-mm Howitzer was designed during World War I to replace the Type 38 15 cm Howitzer. It was manufactured in considerable quantities and remained the standard Japanese medium artillery piece until 1936. Despite being nominally replaced by the Type 96 15 cm howitzer, the Type 4 15 cm howitzer would remain in low-level production until 1944 due to its portability and usefulness in the China theatre.

The Type 4 is the first Japanese weapon to replace the hydrospring recoil system with the hydropneumatic. Its modified box trail allows it to fire at extreme elevations, increasing its usefulness in jungle or rugged terrain.

== Design ==
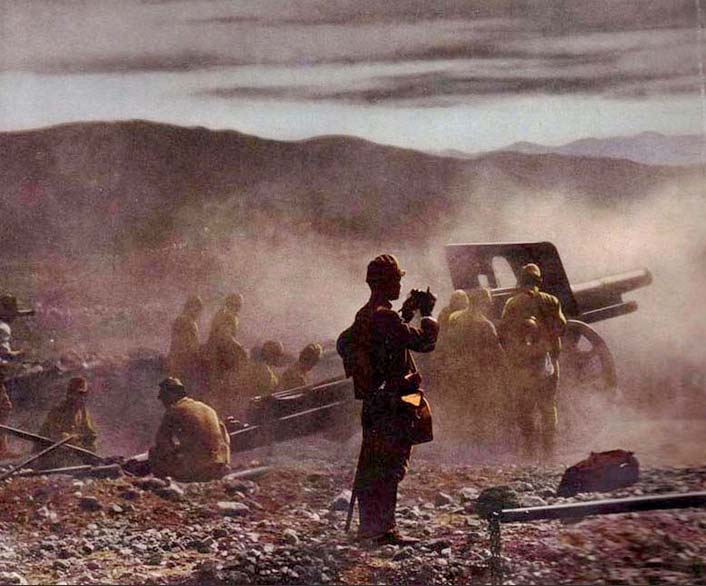
A Type 4 15-cm-howitzer, China 1937

The Type 4 was notable as the first Japanese artillery piece to use a hydro-pneumatic recoil system. It had a vertical sliding breech block and a box type trail. It could be moved short distances as one load, but needed to be broken down into two loads for longer distances. The gun barrel was removed from the cradle and placed on the rear portion of the trail, to which were attached an extra pair of wheels. A limber was attached to each section, so that each load could be towed by six horses.

The type 4 used semifixed ammunition with high-explosive, as well as armor-piercing, shrapnel, chemical, smoke and incendiary tracer projectiles.

Its most remarkable characteristic of the Type 4 is its extreme lightness in relation to the weight of the ammunition it fires. The howitzer is broken down into two loads-the tube and the cradle assembly-for travel. This operation increases the time necessary to emplace it, but in areas where bridges are flimsy or nonexistent, two-load draft considerably increases the mobility of the piece. Although it is possible to tow the Type 4 in one load, it is not safe to do this for considerable distances or over bad roads because of the extreme length of the trail which would be likely to break if subjected to any considerable jolting.

== Combat record ==
Type 4 15 cm Howitzer was considered somewhat obsolescent for frontline combat service from the start of the Second Sino-Japanese War, but as insufficient quantities of the Type 96 15 cm howitzer were produced, it remained in service on many fronts during the Pacific War. Against the Chinese, the Type 4 was used with some success due to the fact the Chinese were desperately lacking in heavy artillery in the early part of the war. However, whenever the Japanese did face Chinese heavy artillery typically armed with German 15 cm sFH 18 heavy artillery guns, e.g. in the Battles of Wuhan and Changsha, Type 4 crews found themselves badly outranged and hopelessly outgunned.

Weapons captured by the Chinese during the Second Sino-Japanese War, or abandoned in China at the time of the surrender of Japan, were placed into service by both the National Revolutionary Army of the Nationalist government and the People's Liberation Army of the Chinese communist forces through the Chinese Civil War (1946-1949).
