= Type 38 15 cm howitzer =

Type 38 15 cm Howitzer
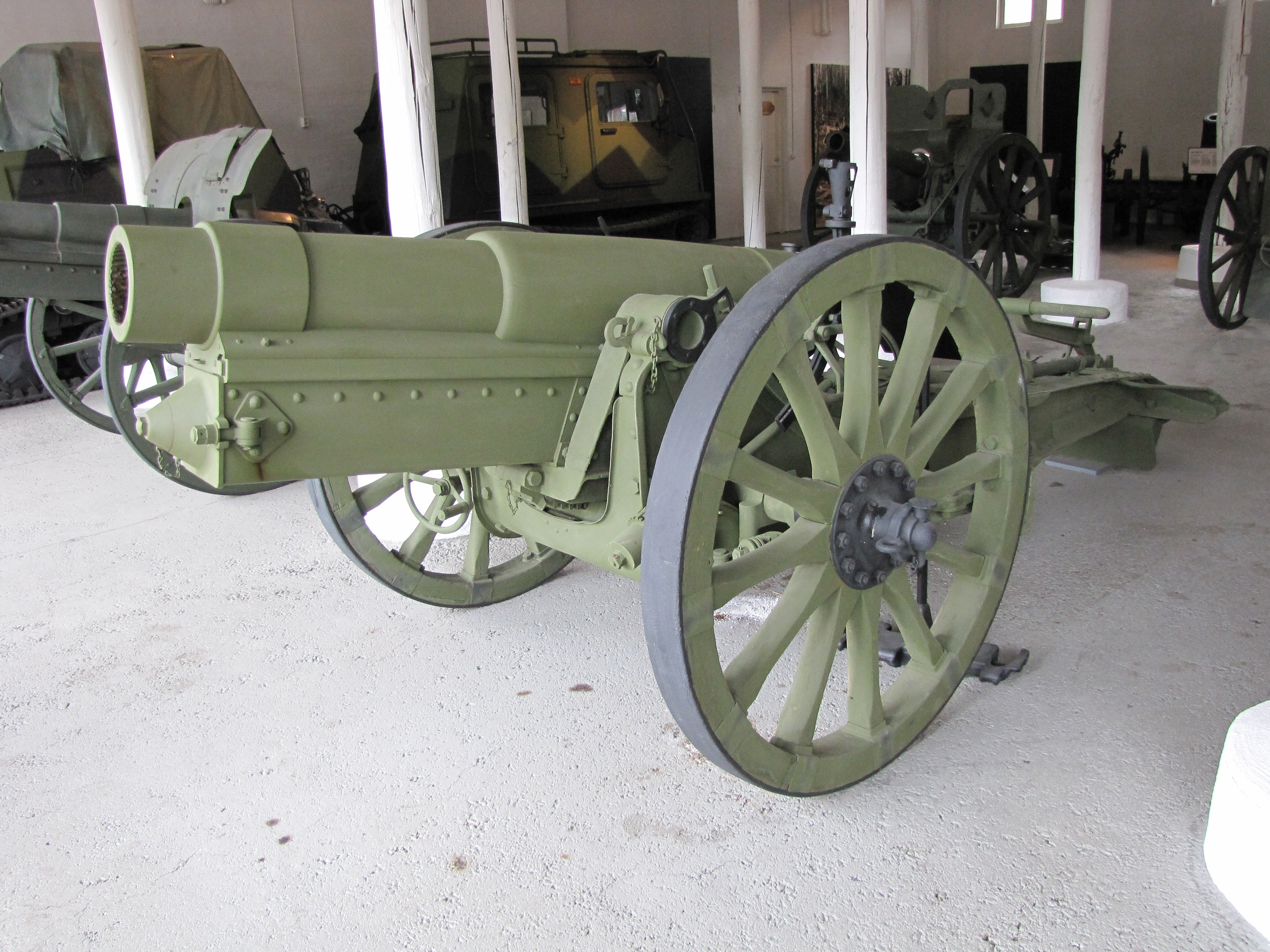
- Type 38 150mm howitzer
- Type: Heavy Howitzer
- Place of origin: German Empire

Service history
- In service: 1905–1945
- Used by: Empire of Japan; Russian Empire; Finland
- Wars: World War I Second Sino-Japanese War; Soviet-Japanese Border Wars; World War II; Chinese Civil War

Production history
- Designer: Krupp
- Designed: c.1905
- Manufacturer: Osaka Arsenal, Japan
- No. built: 224

Specifications
- Mass: 2,250 kg (4,960 lb)
- Barrel length: 1.64 m (5 ft 5 in) L/11
- Shell: 35.9 kg (79 lb 2 oz)
- Caliber: 149.1 mm (5.87 in)
- Breech: Interrupted screw
- Recoil: Hydro-spring
- Carriage: Box trail
- Elevation: 0° to +42° 30'
- Traverse: 5°
- Muzzle velocity: 290 m/s (951 ft/s)
- Maximum firing range: 7,200 m (7,900 yd)
- Sights: Panoramic

The Type 38 15 cm Howitzer (三八式十五糎榴弾砲, Sanhachi-shiki Jyūgo-senchi Ryūdanhō) was a 1905 German Krupp L/12 howitzer design that was purchased by the Empire of Japan as the standard heavy howitzer of the Imperial Japanese Army at the end of the Russo-Japanese War. The Type 38 designation was given to this gun as it was accepted in the 38th year of Emperor Meiji's reign (1905).

== History and development ==
As Japan's priority lay in her navy, the Imperial Army was given a back seat to new land warfare designs, as well as the raw material (steel) needed to build them. Thus, like the US who purchased French Renault tanks (Model 1917s) for its first tank units, the planners at the Imperial Japanese Army General Staff found it necessary to purchase artillery, and turned to Krupp in Germany. Initial units were imported, and then further production was made under license by the Army's Osaka Arsenal starting in 1911.

After World War I, these weapons were considered largely obsolete and efforts were made to replace it with the Type 4 15 cm howitzer. However, it was still found in front line heavy artillery regiments.

== Design ==
The Type 38 150mm Howitzer was a conventional design for its day, complete with crew seats on the gun shield and a solid box trail. It had a hydro-spring recoil system, interrupted screw type breechblock, and 1/16-inch gun shield. It was designed to be moved by a team of eight horses, but in practice, its heavy weight was a problem.

The Type 38 150mm field gun (improved) was capable of firing High-explosive, shrapnel, incendiary, smoke and illumination and gas shells.

Surplus weapons were mounted on the modified chassis of the Type 97 Chi-Ha medium tank as the Type 4 Ho-Ro self-propelled gun.

== Combat record ==
Although obsolete, the Type 38 150mm field gun was found in theatres of operation in the Second Sino-Japanese War, Soviet-Japanese Border Wars and in the early Pacific War. Against the Chinese, the Type 38 was used with some success due to the fact the Chinese were desperately lacking in heavy artillery in the early part of the war. However, whenever the Japanese did face Chinese heavy artillery typically armed with German 15 cm sFH 18 heavy artillery guns, e.g. in the Battles of Wuhan and Changsha, Japanese gun crews found themselves both badly outranged and hopelessly outgunned and the Type 38 was withdrawn from front-line service. In 1942 however, retired barrels found a new lease of life as the Type 4 Ho-Ro self-propelled gun. Units were deployed on Luzon and other islands in the Philippines, and were used in combat against American forces at the Battle of the Philippines in 1944. Other units were retained on the Japanese home islands in anticipation of the projected Allied invasion. As well as Japanese use this type of gun saw use with the Finnish army in the Winter War. They were obtained by the Finns by being captured from the red side of the Finnish Civil War.

== Gallery ==
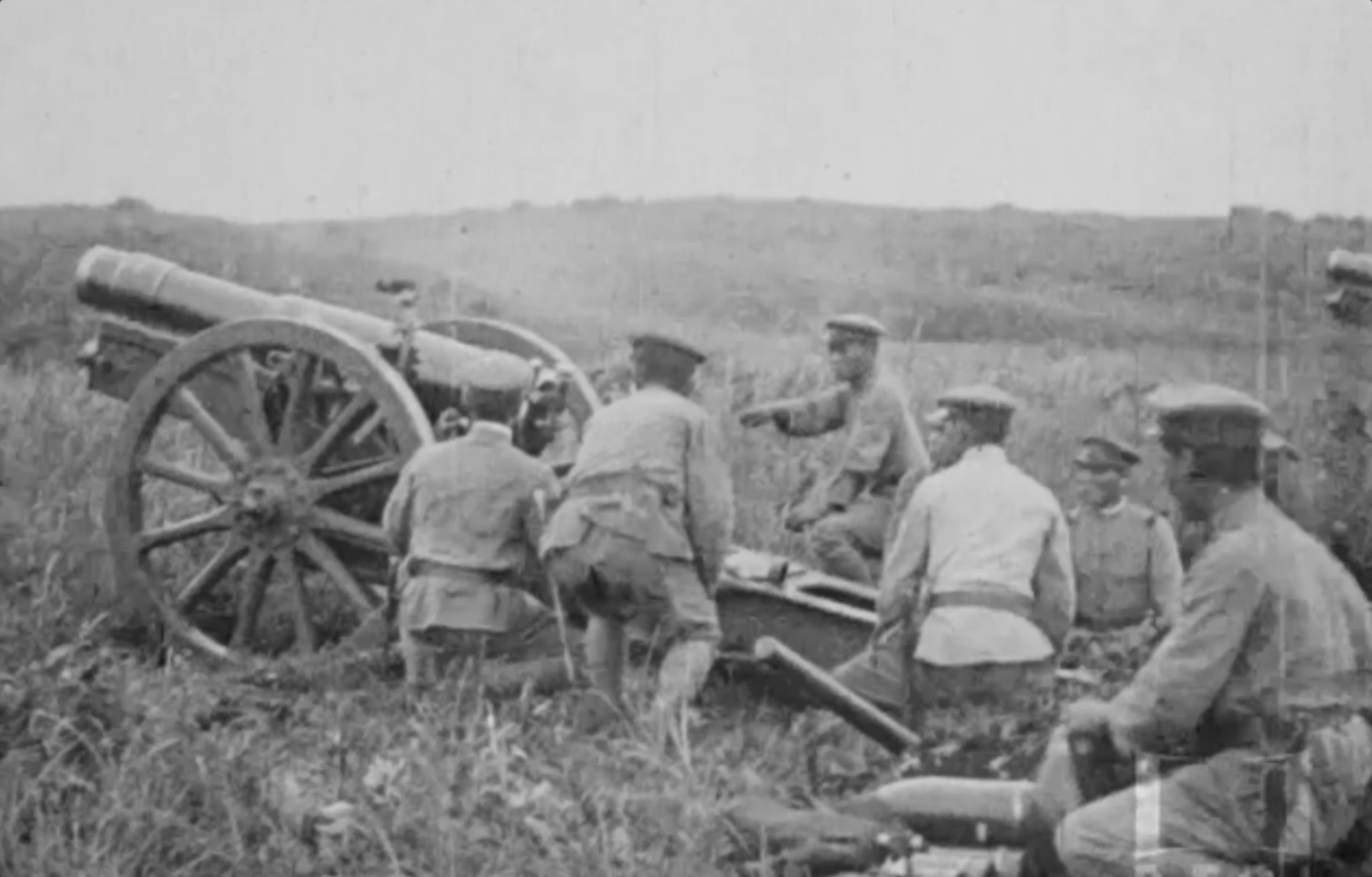
Type 38 15-cm-howitzer during an exercise in 1922

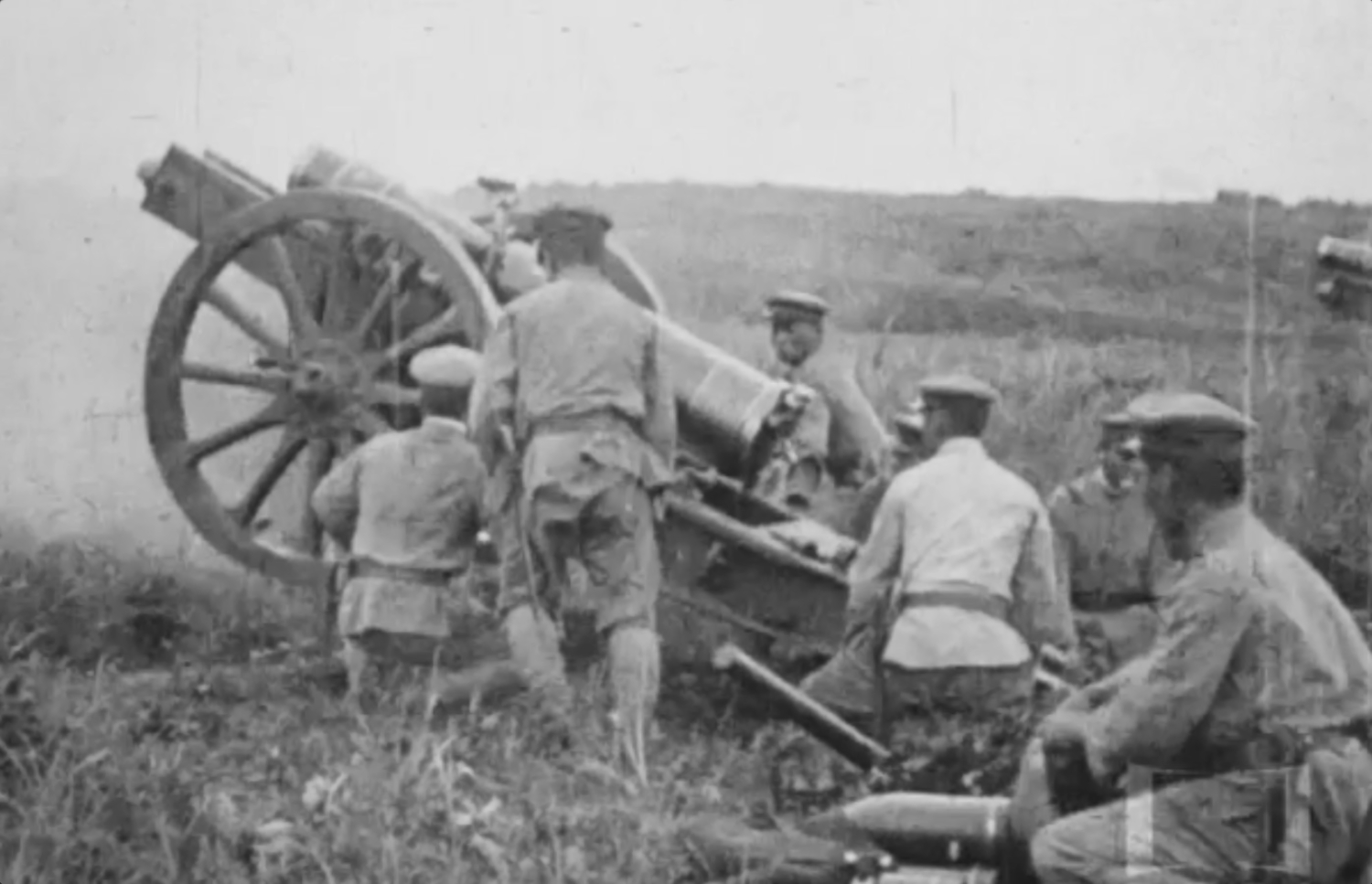
Type 38 15-cm-howitzer during an exercise 1922; the recoil forces were too large for the recoil system
