= 37 mm anti-tank gun M1930 (1-K) =

37 mm anti-tank gun model 1930 (1-K)
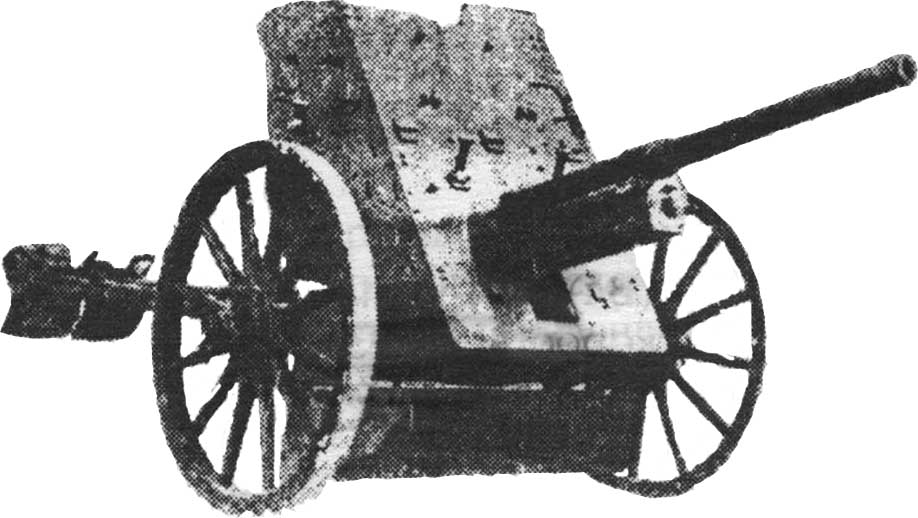
- Type: Anti-tank gun
- Place of origin: Soviet Union

Service history
- Used by: Soviet Union

Production history
- Produced: 1931–1932
- No. built: 509

Specifications
- Barrel length: Bore: 1.56 m (5 ft 1 in) L/42; Overall: 1.66 m (5 ft 5 in) L/45
- Shell: 37 × 250mm R
- Caliber: 37 millimetres (1.5 in)
- Breech: Horizontal-block
- Recoil: Hydro-spring
- Carriage: Split trail
- Elevation: −8° to 25°
- Traverse: 60°
- Rate of fire: 10-15 rpm
- Muzzle velocity: 800–850 m/s (2,600–2,800 ft/s)

The 37 mm anti-tank gun model 1930 (1-K) (Russian: 37-мм противотанковая пушка образца 1930 года (1-К)) was a Soviet light anti-tank gun used in the first stage of the German-Soviet War.

== Description ==
The 1-K was a Soviet anti-tank gun initially developed by the German company Rheinmetall. The gun was closely related to the German PaK 35/36. It lacked some improvements eventually introduced in the PaK 35/36, but was basically the same design; each gun could use ammunition of the other. The 1-K had a split trail carriage with unsprung wooden wheels (while the PaK 35/36 received a suspension and new wheels). It was equipped with a horizontal sliding block breechblock, hydraulic recoil buffer and spring recuperator.

== Development and production ==
The Soviet Union started to develop anti-tank guns in the late 1920s. These attempts failed to advance beyond early stages as Soviet engineers lacked experience with this type of weapon. To solve this problem the USSR received assistance from Germany. The Treaty of Versailles forbade Germany to have anti-tank artillery, but Rheinmetall secretly continued to work on anti-tank guns and in 1926 built a pre-production sample of a new 3.7 cm gun model 26. For their part the Germans were interested in any opportunity to proceed with development of this and other types of weapons.

In 1929, Rheinmetall created a dummy company Butast for contacts with the USSR. In accordance with the Sovnarkom decision from 8 August 1930, on 28 August in Berlin a secret agreement was signed. The Germans were obliged to help the USSR with production of six artillery systems:

- 37 mm anti-tank gun
- 76 mm anti-aircraft gun
- 152 mm mortar
- 152 mm howitzer
- 20 mm anti-aircraft autocannon
- 37 mm anti-aircraft autocannon

For $1,125 mil. Rheinmetall supplied pre-production samples, documentation and parts from which in the USSR a few pieces of each type could be assembled. All involved weapons were modern, and many of the same designs were eventually used by the Wehrmacht in World War II. In the USSR these weapons were adopted; however even with German help Soviet industry still was not ready for mass production of some types, such as anti-aircraft autocannons.

Among other pieces, Rheinmetall brought to the USSR 12 37 mm anti-tank guns, which can be seen as an early variant of the PaK 35/36 - the most numerous anti-tank gun of the Wehrmacht until 1942.

== Production ==
The gun was produced at the Plant no. 8 (named after Kalinin), where it received index 1-K. The production rate was slow as manufacturing process included handicraft operations. In 1931 the plant built 255 pieces, but none passed quality control. In 1932 404 pieces were accepted (and in 1933 105 more followed, still from the 1932 batch), but then the production was stopped due to adoption of more powerful 45 mm anti-tank gun M1932 (19-K).

1-K was also a base for the 37 mm tank gun B-3 (5-K), the main armament of the BT-2 light tank.

== Service ==
1-K was the first dedicated anti-tank gun of the Red Army (RKKA) and as such was actively used for training of anti-tank units. On 1 January 1936 RKKA possessed 506 guns of the type, of them 422 operational, 53 waiting for repair, 28 used for training, 3 unfit. When RKKA received large numbers of more powerful 45 mm guns, many 1-Ks were apparently relegated to training facilities and depots. The exact number of 1-Ks in service in June 1941 has not been determined. It is known that the gun was present in some units, e.g. 8th Mechanized Corps and it is likely that pieces stored in army depots were also rushed into active service. However, there are no certain reports of their combat use. Apparently most of the guns were lost in combat at the early stage of the German-Soviet War. The German designation for captured guns was 3.7 cm Pak 158(r).

== Summary ==
The significance of the 1-K lies in the fact that it was the first Soviet anti-tank gun. As such, it gave some valuable experience. It also became the base for a series of Soviet 45 mm anti-tank guns.

It was a light and compact gun which could be easily moved by its crew. The drawbacks were a lack of suspension, weak fragmentation shell (because of small caliber) and poor manufacturing quality. RKKA wanted a larger-caliber gun that could be used as a battalion gun as well as in an anti-tank role, so the 1-K was quickly replaced in production by its 45 mm descendants.

By 1941 the gun was adequate only against lightly armoured vehicles. Modern tanks could only be penetrated from their side and only at short (less than 300 metres) range. The situation was aggravated by low ammunition quality, which explains smaller penetration figures compared to the PaK 35/36. As noted above, the 1-K could fire German shells, improving its anti-armor performance roughly to the level of early Soviet 45 mm guns, as those also suffered from problems with ammunition quality.

This was due primarily to the use of gunpowder with a nitrocellulose primer as propellant in all Soviet small arms, artillery and anti-tank artillery up until well into 1942, when British convoy shipments of Cordite and more advanced propellant technology became available. Also the continued use of obsolete APHE technology ammunition, which most nations had long abandoned for considerably improved penetration performance of solid shot AP, APC and APCBC ammunition technology.

The APHE shell itself was of the 1890s Hotchkiss naval type consisting of a hard-nosed forged-steel projectile with a base-mounted inertial deceleration shock-delay fuse with a stable explosive filler, most likely Picric Acid. APHE shells are more effective against battlefield sandbag, earthwork or log improvised fortifications and domestic buildings than equivalent-calibre impact detonating HE or fragmentation shells. APHE can be regarded as a useful dual-purpose round in many respects.

German Rheinmetall-Borsig evaluation tests on a captured 1-K, during 1941, gave a maximum penetration of up to 42 mm of perpendicular rolled homogenous armour plate at 100 metres with APHE and up to 61 mm of perpendicular hardened carbon steel armour plate at 100 metres with APHE. (Note that all tank-building nations had abandoned the use of carburized hardened carbon steel in favour of the increased protection offered by rolled nickel-chromium homogeneous steel armour plate, cast nickel-chromium steel and cast ferro-nickel based armoured alloys by the mid-1920s onwards).

By comparison the German 37 mm PaK 35/36 could penetrate up to 44 mm of perpendicular rolled homogenous armour plate at 100 metres with PzGr.18. APHE, up to 64 mm of perpendicular hardened carbon steel at 100 metres with PzGr.18. APHE, up to 65 mm of perpendicular rolled homogenous armour plate at 100 metres with PzGr.39. APCBC and up to 79 mm of perpendicular rolled homogenous armour plate at 100 metres with PzGr.40. APCR.

The PaK 35/36 used Binatol as a propellant.

== Ammunition ==
Available ammunition
Type	Model	Weight, kg	HE weight, g	Muzzle velocity, m/s	Range, m
Armour-piercing shells
APHE	M-160	0,66	9	820	5,600
High explosive and fragmentation shells
Fragmentation	O-160	0,645	22	825	5,750
Canister shots
Canister shot	Sch-160	0,928	30 bullets
Canister shot	Sch-160	0,950	50 bullets

Armour penetration table
AP projectile B-160
Distance, m	Meet angle 60°, mm	Meet angle 90°, mm
300	?	30
500	20 ?	25 ?
800	?	20 ?
This data was obtained by Soviet methodics of armour penetration measurement (penetration probability equals 80%). It is not directly comparable with western data of similar type.
