= 152 mm mortar M1931 (NM) =

152 mm mortar model 1931 (NM)
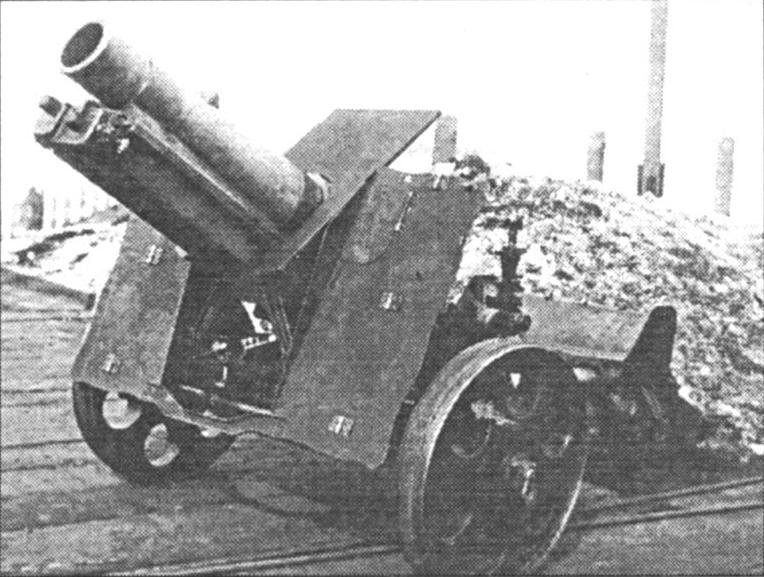
- Type: Field howitzer
- Place of origin: Soviet Union

Service history
- In service: 1935–1942
- Used by: Soviet Union

Production history
- Designer: Rheinmetall
- Designed: 1930–1931
- Manufacturer: Plant No. 172
- Produced: 1932–1935
- No. built: Prototype: 8; Production: 129; ML-21: 3

Specifications
- Mass: combat: 1,150 kg (2,540 lb)
- Length: 3.73 m (12 ft 3 in)
- Barrel length: overall: 1.41 m (4 ft 8 in) / 9.3 calibers
- Width: 1.79 m (5 ft 10 in)
- Height: 1.21 m (4 ft 0 in)
- Crew: 8
- Caliber: 152.4 mm (6 in)
- Breech: Horizontal sliding-block
- Recoil: Hydro-pneumatic
- Carriage: Box trail
- Elevation: −2° to 72°
- Traverse: 12°

152 mm mortar M1931 (NM) (Russian: 152-мм мортира образца 1931 года (НМ)) was a 152.4 mm (6 inch) artillery piece originally developed by the German arms manufacturer Rheinmetall. The gun was produced in limited numbers in the Soviet Union and saw action with the Soviet Army in World War II. A modified version of the design was also adopted in Germany, as 15 cm sIG 33.

== Description ==
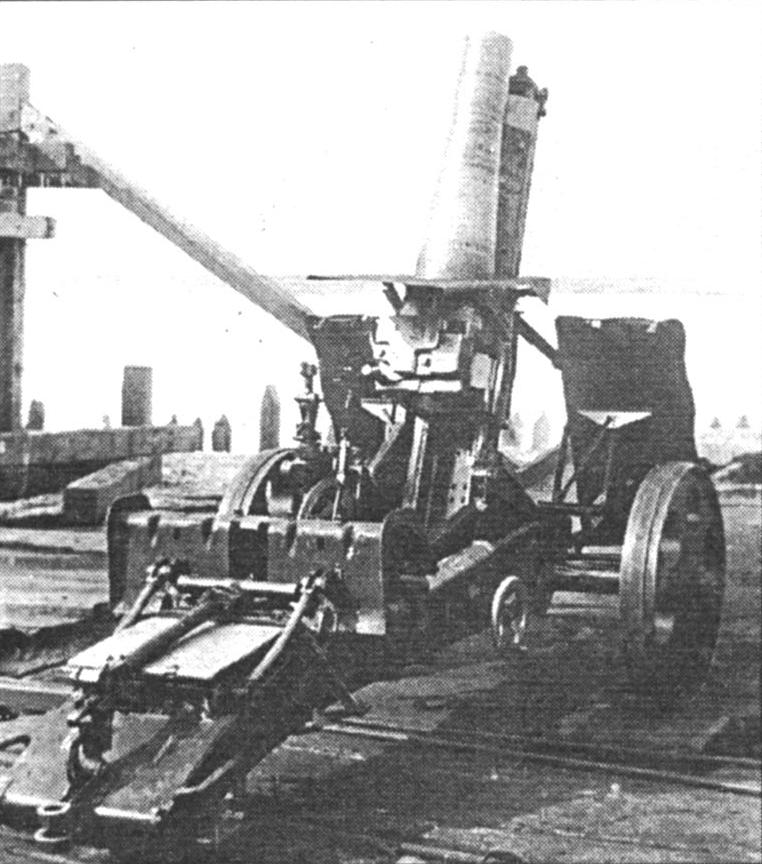
A M1930 at maximum elevation.

The gun had monobloc barrel fitted with horizontal sliding-block. The recoil system consisted of hydraulic compressor and hydro-pneumatic recuperator, both mounted in the gun cradle. The recoil length was fixed. The carriage was of box trail type, with equilibrator, suspension and a folding recoil spade. Metal wheels had removable rubber tires. The gun was equipped with a gun shield.

== Development and production ==
The first 152 mm divisional mortar for the RKKA was developed in by Kirov Plant in 1930. The gun weighed about 1,500 kg. It utilized a breechblock and other elements of the 152 mm fortress howitzer M1909. It is not clear whether the piece was ever completed.

From late 1920s, USSR looked for foreign assistance in modernizing its artillery. Germany could and was willing to offer such assistance. The cooperation with USSR allowed Germany, constrained by the Treaty of Versailles, an opportunity to proceed with arms development. In 1929, German arms manufacturer Rheinmetall created a dummy company Butast for contacts with USSR. In accordance with the Sovnarkom decision from 8 August 1930, on 28 August in Berlin a secret agreement was signed. Germans undertook to help USSR with production of six artillery systems:

- 37 mm anti-tank gun
- 76 mm anti-aircraft gun
- 152 mm mortar
- 152 mm howitzer
- 20 mm anti-aircraft autocannon
- 37 mm anti-aircraft autocannon

For $1,125 mil. Rheinmetall supplied pre-production samples, documentation and parts from which in USSR a few pieces of each type could be assembled.

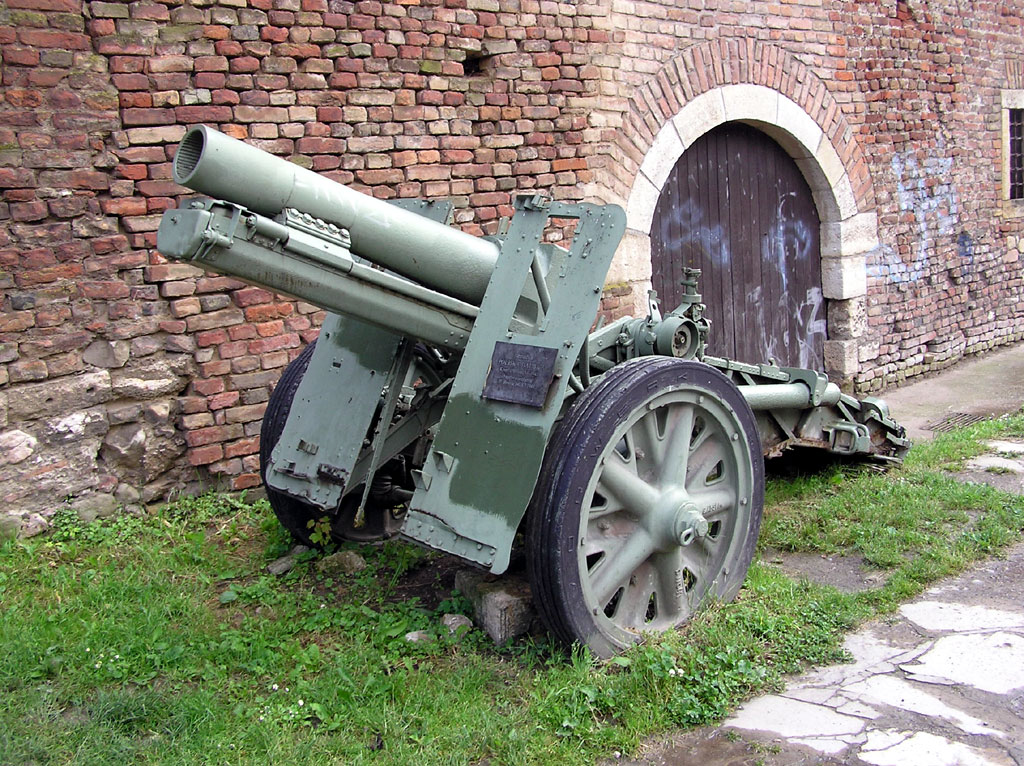
For the sake of comparison: 15 cm sIG 33.

Among other pieces, Rheinmetall brought to USSR eight 152 mm mortars. The guns went through ground trials in June 1931 and were tested by the army in August 1932. The weapon was adopted as 152 mm mortar M1931. In the contemporary documents it is often referred to as N or NM.

The gun was in production from 1932 to 1935 at Plant no. 172 (MZM – Motovilikha Machinery Plant; Russian: МЗМ – Мотовилихинский завод машиностроения). The production continuously lagged behind the schedule. In 1932, 5 mortars were manufactured; in 1933 – 50, in 1934 – 59, and in 1935 – 15 pieces. During the production period the gun was repeatedly modified; for example, the barrel of was lengthened by 65 mm.

In 1937 a modernized variant was developed. This variant, designated ML-21, reached factory trials on 27 March 1937 and ground and army trials in 1938. The trials revealed some minor defects. The ML-21 was never adopted.

Meanwhile, in Germany a modified variant of the original Rheinmetall design was adopted as 15 cm sIG 33.

== Variants ==
- The original variant, supplied from Germany (8 pieces).
- The Soviet mass production variant with longer barrel (129 pieces).
- ML-21 (3 pieces).

== Self-propelled mounts ==
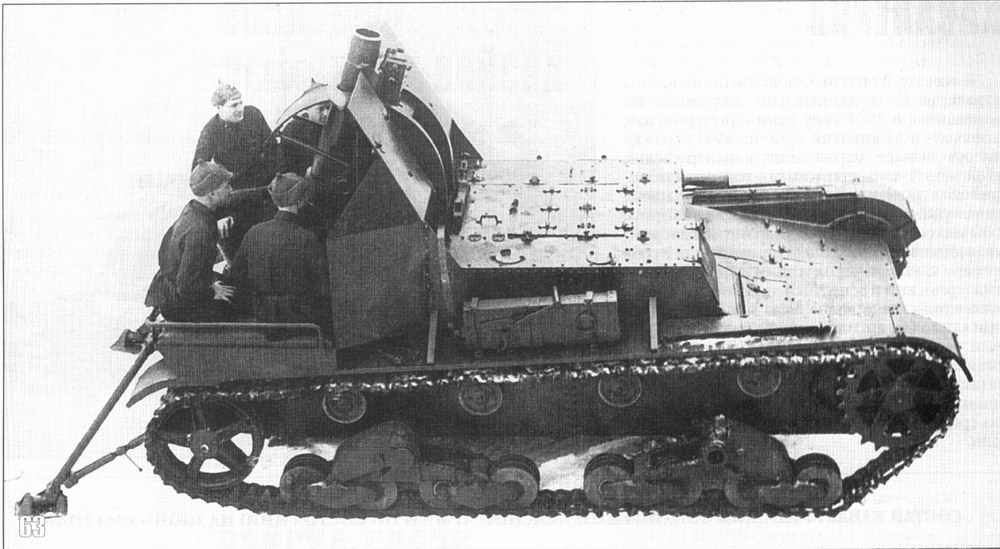
The SU-5-3.

The NM was experimentally mounted on T-26 tank chassis. The resulting self-propelled gun, designated SU-5-3, successfully underwent factory trials in 1934 and even took part in a parade at the Red Square. However, in 1935 the project was cancelled, because the T-26 chassis was considered too weak for a 152 mm piece. The fate of the prototype vehicle is unknown. There is an unconfirmed information that it was rebuilt as SU-5-2, armed with 122 mm howitzer M1910/30.

== Employment ==
The NM was employed in divisional artillery, which from 1935 to June 1941 included a battalion of 152 mm howitzers. On 1 November 1936 RKKA possessed 104 pieces (including three practical and one non-operational). By June 1941 only 51 of them remained and, according to the historian M. Svirin, all these were in mobilization reserve. Some pieces saw combat early in the German-Soviet War. In 1942, new ballistic tables for the mortar were released.

== Summary ==
Despite some advantages of the NM, notably its versatility and very light weight for a 152-mm piece, the production was cancelled after a limited number of guns were built. According to M. Svirin, complexity of the design was the main reason. For example, Soviet ordnance plants experienced major problems with production of sliding breechblocks. Also, the NM poorly fitted the Soviet artillery doctrine, mainly because of its range – too short for a divisional gun. The related German design – the 15 cm sIG 33 – was employed as a regimental weapon; it was somewhat heavy for a regimental piece. In the RKKA, the niche of heavy regimental weapon was filled by a 120 mm infantry mortar, a cheaper, lighter weapon with slightly longer range, but on the other hand less powerful, less accurate and less versatile. Eventually, a need for a divisional weapon more powerful than a 122 mm howitzer became apparent; in 1943 the RKKA adopted another infantry mortar, the 160 mm divisional mortar MT-13, which was similar to the NM in terms of weight, range and shell weight.

== Ammunition ==
The mortar used separate loading ammunition. The cartridge case could contain five different propellant charges. In addition to an old HE shell, two new HE-Frag shells were developed. The "draft 4139" shell was produced in limited numbers and was no longer used by 1934.

Available ammunition
Type	Model	Weight	Filler weight	Muzzle velocity	Range
High explosive and fragmentation shells
HE-Fragmentation	draft 4139	38.33 kg (84.5 lb)	7.612 kg (16.78 lb)
HE-Fragmentation	draft 3905 / OF-521	38.21 kg (84.2 lb)	7.69 kg (17.0 lb)	250 m/s (820 ft/s)	5,285 m (5,780 yd)
HE, old	F-533	40.41 kg (89.1 lb)	8.0 kg (17.6 lb)	241 m/s (790 ft/s)	5,041 m (5,513 yd)
Chemical shells
Fragmentation-chemical	OH-521
Chemical	H-521
