= Type 96 15 cm howitzer =

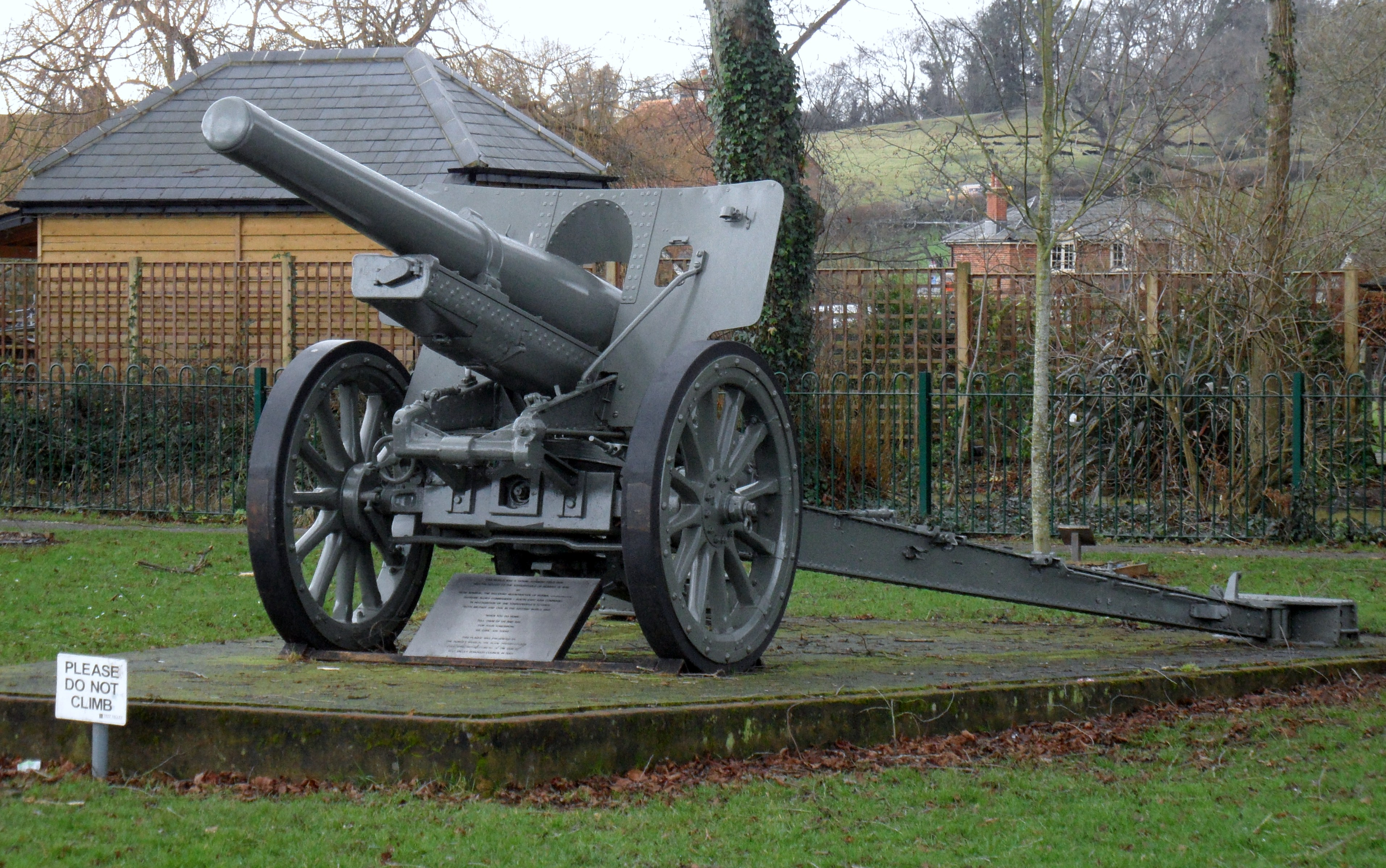
- Type: Howitzer
- Place of origin: Empire of Japan

Service history
- In service: 1936–1945 (Japan)
- Used by: Imperial Japanese Army; Indonesia
- Wars: Second Sino-Japanese War; Soviet-Japanese Border Wars; World War II; Indonesian National Revolution; Malayan Emergency; Chinese Civil War; Korean War

Production history
- Designed: 1920–1934
- Unit cost: 43,500 yen ($11,689 USD) in August 1939
- Produced: 1936–1944
- No. built: 604

Specifications
- Mass: 4,140 kg (9,130 lb) Firing, 4,920 kg (10,847 lb) Traveling
- Length: 6.71 m (22 ft 0 in) Firing, 9.25 m (30 ft 4 in) Traveling
- Barrel length: 3.523 m (11 ft 7 in) 23.37 calibers
- Width: 1.65 m (5 ft 5 in)
- Height: 2.01 m (6 ft 7 in)
- Shell: 31.3 kg (69 lb)
- Caliber: 149.1 mm (5.87 in)
- Carriage: Split trail
- Elevation: -5 to +65 degrees
- Traverse: 30°
- Rate of fire: 3–4 rpm
- Muzzle velocity: 540 m/s (1,772 ft/s)
- Maximum firing range: 11,900 m (13,014 yd)
- Sights: panoramic

The Type 96 15 cm howitzer (九六式十五糎榴弾砲, Kyūroku-shiki Jyūgo-senchi Ryūdanhō) was a 149.1 mm calibre howitzer used by the Imperial Japanese Army during World War II. It was intended to replace the Type 4 15 cm howitzer in front line combat units. It was first used in the Second Sino-Japanese War where it earned high praise from the troops. The Type 96 15 cm howitzer was based on a design by the French company Schneider, but modified locally to meet Japanese requirements.

The Type 96 was used as the main howitzer by the heavy artillery units of the army until the end of World War II. The Type 96 designation was given to this gun as it was accepted in the year 2596 of the Japanese calendar (1936).

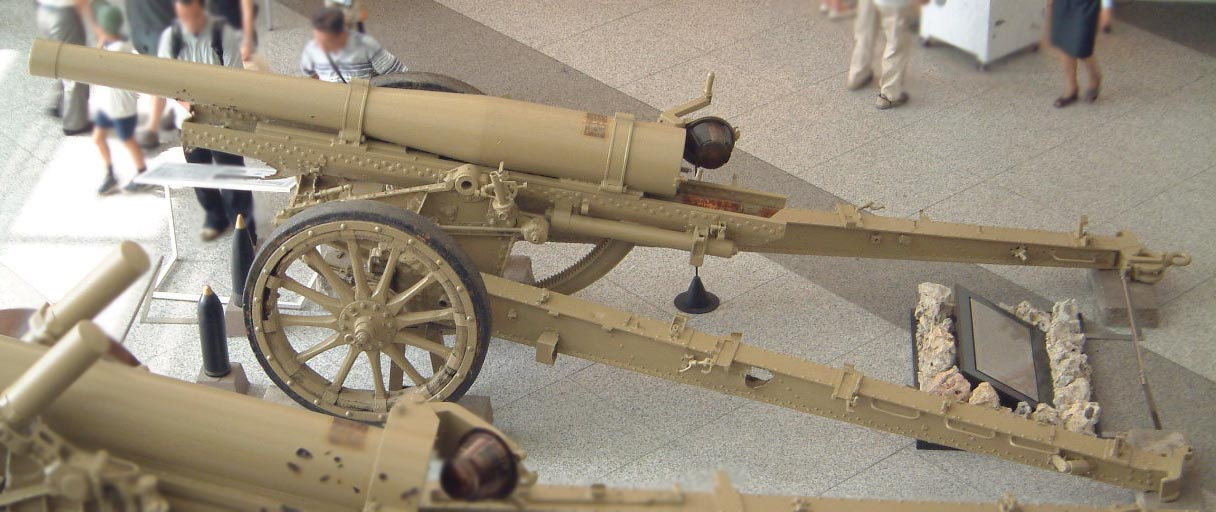
A battle damaged Type 96 at Yasukuni Shrine

== History and development ==
Work on developing a new field howitzer for the Japanese Army began in 1920 and continued for over a decade. The Japanese Army sent numerous military attachés to Europe during World War I and observed the effectiveness of sustained artillery barrages against fixed defenses and opposing infantry. The final specifications to meet the Army's requirements called for a howitzer that could be elevated to 65 degrees, with a maximum range of 12,000 yards, which could be transported by a team of six horses. The new design, aided by French defense company Schneider, was ready by 1934, but Army Chief of Staff Kazushige Ugaki opposed its production until further modifications were made. Production finally commenced in 1936. A total of 604 units were produced by the time production ceased in 1944.

The revised Type 96 howitzer could be identified by a relatively short tube with muzzle only slightly forward of rectangular cradle, three demountable spade plates and demountable trail block for each trail end, wheel chocks and leaf springs above the axle.

== Design ==
The Type 96 15 cm howitzer was regarded by Allied military intelligence to be one of the most modern, well designed and effective weapons in the Japanese arsenal. Mounted on sturdy, rubber-shod, wooden wheels, the weapon was normally tractor drawn. One of its outstanding characteristics was its extreme elevation capability of 65° (which could only be used when a deep loading pit was dug beneath the breech. Although the Type 96 (1936) 150 mm howitzer had been made in considerable quantity since the time of its adoption, it had not yet completely replaced the Type 4 150 mm howitzer in Japanese medium artillery units. The Type 96, the last artillery weapon developed during the period of redesigning, was heavier than the Type 4, had a somewhat greater range, and traveled as a single load drawn by tractor. In travel, it was jacked up on a leaf spring. During firing, the spring was depressed so the piece fired off its axle. The Type 96 used the same ammunition as the Type 4.

Ammunition used included high-explosive shells, as well as armor-piercing, Shrapnel, smoke and incendiary tracer shells.

== Combat record ==
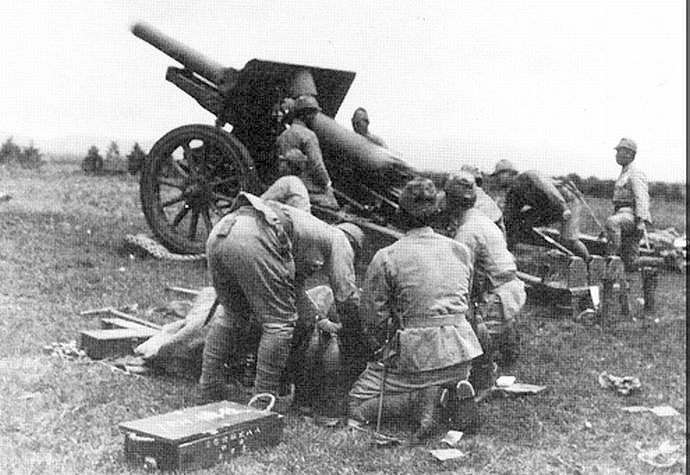
A Type 96 in action.

The Type 96 15 cm howitzer was first used in combat in the Second Sino-Japanese War and was highly praised by its crews.

After the start of the Pacific War, it was assigned to Japanese units at the Battle of Bataan and Battle of Corregidor in the Philippines, as well as at the Battle of Guadalcanal. Many units were at the Battle of Okinawa and the Soviet-Japanese War. It continued to be used as the main howitzer of Japanese heavy artillery units until the end of World War II.

A surviving example is preserved at the Yushukan Museum at Yasukuni Shrine in Tokyo. Additional examples can be found in a parking lot in Bellevue, Washington, just east of 124th Ave. NE on the Bel-Red Road (complete with gun shield but without the breech block), and in front of the Veterans Memorial Building in San Luis Obispo, California, USA, although that one is in poor condition. Another surviving example is on display in Olathe, Colorado at Lions Park, corner of 5th St and Hersum Ave. There is also another example present in Hampshire, at the war memorial park in Romsey which was presented by Louis Mountbatten in 1946.
