= 15 cm sIG 33 auf Fahrgestell Panzerkampfwagen II (Sf) =

German heavy assault gun

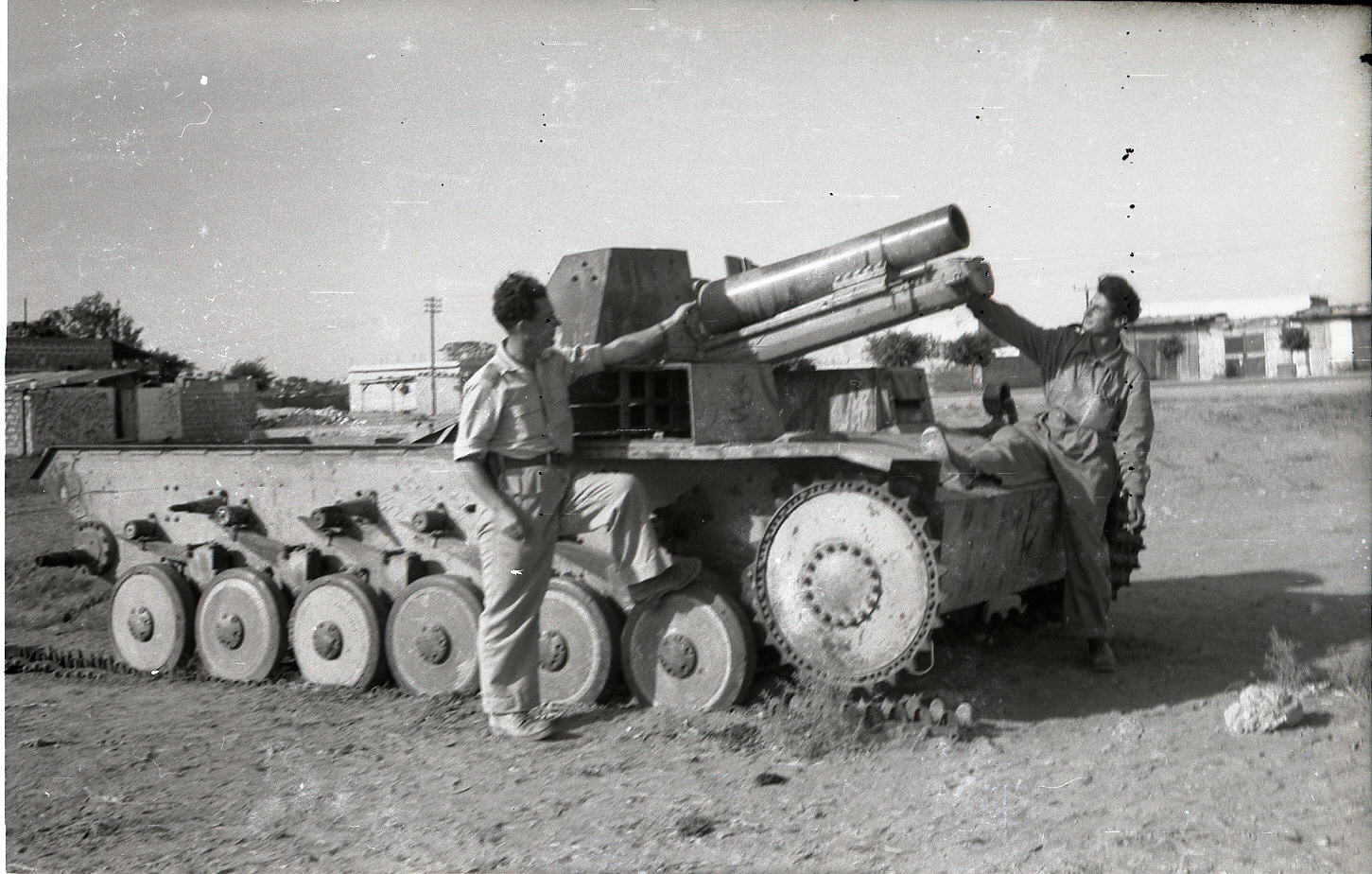
- Wrecked example, captured by the Israelis from Egypt in 1948
- Type: Heavy assault gun
- Place of origin: Nazi Germany

Service history
- In service: 1942–1943, 1948
- Used by: See § Operators
- Wars: World War II; 1948 Arab–Israeli War

Production history
- Manufacturer: Alkett
- Produced: 1941–1942
- No. built: 12

Specifications
- Mass: 11.2 t (11.0 long tons; 12.3 short tons)
- Length: 5.41 m (17.7 ft)
- Width: 2.6 m (8.5 ft)
- Height: 1.9 m (6.2 ft)
- Crew: 4
- Armor: 5–30 mm (0.20–1.18 in)
- Main armament: 1 × 15 cm (5.9 in) sIG 33 heavy infantry gun
- Secondary armament: 1 × 7.92 mm Maschinengewehr 34
- Engine: Bussing-NAG engine
- Transmission: 6 forward, 1 reverse gears
- Suspension: leaf-spring
- Operational range: 160 km (99 mi)
- Maximum speed: 40 km/h (25 mph)

The 15 cm sIG 33 auf Fahrgestell Panzerkampfwagen II (Sf), sometimes referred to as the Sturmpanzer II Bison, was a German assault gun used during World War II. The dozen vehicles produced were assigned to the 90th Light Infantry Division in North Africa during the war.

== Development ==
The 15-centimetre (5.9 in) sIG 33 gun was used as direct-fire artillery in support of assaulting infantry. To improve its mobility 38 guns were mounted on a Panzerkampfwagen I chassis in February 1940. The 15 cm sIG 33 (Sf) auf Panzerkampfwagen I Ausf B that had participated in the Invasion of France in 1940 had proven to be too heavy for its chassis as well as being enormously tall.

The same gun was mated to the Panzerkampfwagen II chassis in an attempt to drastically lower its height while using a stronger chassis. The prototype used a standard Panzer II Ausf. B chassis when it was built in February 1941, but this was too cramped for use. The chassis was lengthened by 60 centimetres (24 in), which required adding a sixth roadwheel, and widened by 32 centimetres (13 in) to better accommodate the gun while preserving its low silhouette. 15-millimetre (0.6 in) plates formed the front and sides of the open-topped fighting compartment, which was also open at the rear. Its sides were notably lower than the front, which made the crew vulnerable to small arms fire and shell fragments. Large hatches were added to the rear deck to better cool the engine. The vehicle carried 30 rounds for the gun which could traverse a total of 5° left and right and used a Rblf36 sight.

== Combat use ==
Twelve were built in December 1941 – January 1942. They were shipped to North Africa later that year, where they formed schwere Infanteriegeschütz-Kompanien (mot.S.) ("Heavy Self-propelled Infantry Gun Companies") 707 and 708. They were used as close support mobile artillery, with the former assigned to Schützen-Regiment 155 and the latter to Schützen-Regiment 200, both part of the 90. leichte Afrika-Division. Both companies fought until the Axis surrender in Tunisia in May 1943.

At the outbreak of the 1948 Arab–Israeli War, the Egyptian Army armored units had three 15 cm sIG 33 auf Fahrgestell Panzerkampfwagen II (Sf) at their disposal, alongside British-made vehicles and American M4 Sherman tanks.

== Operators ==
- Kingdom of Egypt − 3, ex-Afrika Korps vehicles
- Nazi Germany
