= Cannone da 76/17 S modello 12 =

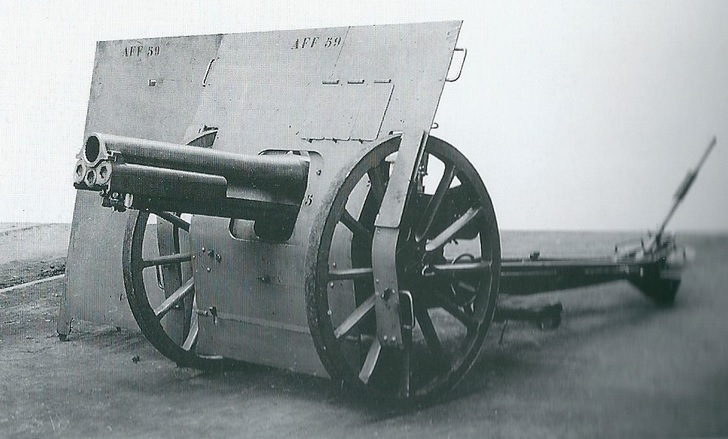
- A 76/17 with extended shield for the fuse setter.
- Type: Landing gun
- Place of origin: France

Service history
- Used by: Italy
- Wars: World War I World War II

Production history
- Designer: Schneider-Creusot
- Designed: 1912
- Manufacturer: Gio. Ansaldo & C.

Specifications
- Mass: 512 kg (1,129 lb)
- Barrel length: 1.4 m (4 ft 7 in) L/18.4
- Width: .9 m (2 ft 11 in)
- Height: 1.12 m (3 ft 8 in)
- Shell: Fixed quickfire 76 x 165R
- Shell weight: Land: 5.3 kg (12 lb); Sea: 8.5 kg (19 lb)
- Caliber: 76.2 mm (3 in)
- Breech: Interrupted screw
- Recoil: Hydro-pneumatic
- Carriage: Box trail
- Elevation: Center pivot: -3° to +28° Gun carriage: -13° to +28°
- Traverse: 4°
- Rate of fire: 12-14 rpm
- Muzzle velocity: Land: 375 m/s (1,230 ft/s); Sea: 200 m/s (660 ft/s)
- Maximum firing range: 6 km (3.7 mi)

The Cannone da 76/17 S modello 12 was a landing gun designed by Schneider-Creusot in France and built under license by Gio. Ansaldo & C. in Italy that was used by Italy during World War I and possibly World War II.

== Background ==
Like other colonial powers, warships of the Regia Marina sometimes carried a contingent of naval infantry that was responsible for manning garrisons to defend Italian ships while in foreign ports as well as arming troops for offensive amphibious operations. The problem that Schneider's engineers faced was that Brigata Marina troops were often an expeditionary force operating in areas with limited road and rail infrastructure so a lightweight gun was needed to provide fire support to landing parties in rough terrain.

The field artillery of the time was designed to be towed by horse teams and then manhandled into firing position. Field artillery could usually be broken down into separate wagon loads with the barrel on one wagon towed by a horse team while a second horse team towed the carriage. Since traditional field artillery would be too large and heavy to be easily deployed during amphibious operations without specialized landing craft the guns would need to be broken down and stowed while at sea. It was thought it would be an advantage if the gun could be mounted on a center pivot mount aboard a launch to provide fire support for a landing party. Once ashore the landing party could remove the gun barrel from its shipboard mount and place it on its field carriage.

== Design ==
Schneider's designation for the gun was Canon Schneider de 76.2 mm de Débarquement Type M.C.5. The Cannone da 76/17 was a breech-loaded gun with an interrupted screw breech, a box trail carriage, gun shield, hydro-pneumatic recoil mechanism, and two wooden-spoked steel-rimmed wheels. When assembled the guns could be attached to a limber that carried 32 rounds of ammunition and towed by the gun crew or a horse team.

The gun used fixed quickfire ammunition and the catalogue Les Établissements Schneider. Matériels d'artillerie et bateaux de guerre lists separate figures for projectile weight and muzzle velocity for land and sea projectiles. So different projectiles may have been used depending on the role. La Guerra Nelle Raccolte Della Sezione Fotografica Del Comando Supremo Del R Esercito also has a photo of a 76/17 on a HA/LA mount for anti-aircraft use but no details of its use are given. Ansaldo proposed mounting 12 guns on the back of flatbed trucks to act as mobile anti-aircraft guns but it is unknown if any were built.

== Gallery ==
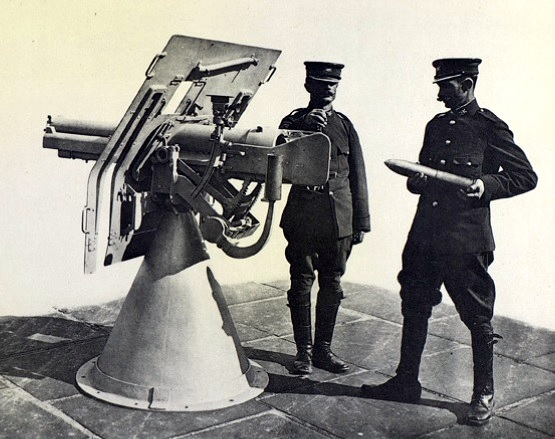
A 76/17 on its center pivot mount.

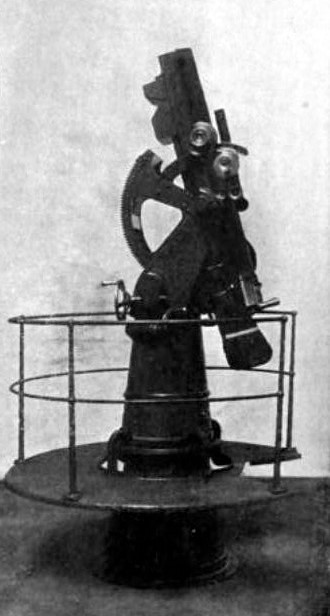
A 76/17 on a HA/LA mount for anti-aircraft use.

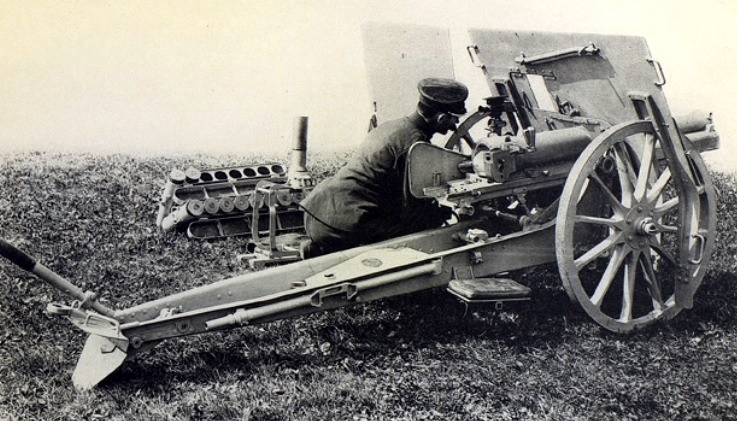
A 76/17 in firing position with shield for the fuse setter.

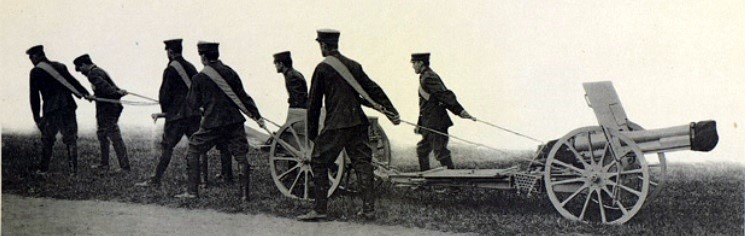
A 76/17 attached to its limber being towed by the gun crew.

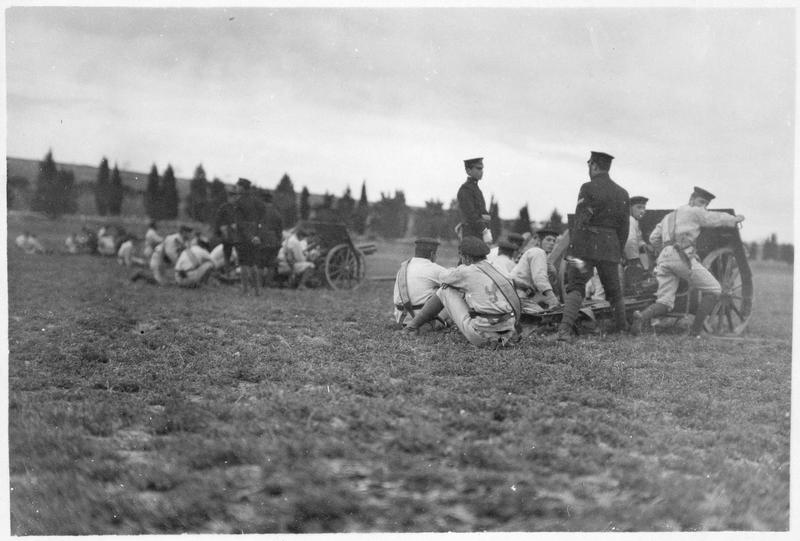
A battery of 76/17's with Brigata Marina troops of the Regia Marina.
