= Hydraulic compressor =

Air compressor driven by a hydraulic motor

A hydraulic compressor is a means of compressing air using hydraulic energy. There are two very different types of machines referred to as hydraulic compressors.

One type is a mechanical air compressor that is driven by a hydraulic motor. It is a method of converting hydraulic power to pneumatic power. This type of hydraulic compressor is used in various applications where hydraulic power is already available and a relatively small amount of compressed air is needed, as it is not very efficient compared to an electrically driven compressor.

The other type of hydraulic compressor uses the potential and kinetic energy of a stream of water to entrain air and carry it to a separating chamber at a higher pressure where the air accumulates above the water, and the water is allowed to drain. The system has few, if any, moving parts, and is also inefficient, so it is used where the kinetic or potential energy of water is cheaply available.

== Design ==
The advantage of a hydraulic compressor of the second type is the ability to perform isothermal compression without any moving parts, making it relatively reliable and having low maintenance costs. A flow of water is used to entrain air and carry it downward through a pipe, called the downcomer pipe. Air is sucked into the water flow by the static pressure differential. As the mixture of air and water goes down the pipe, the pressure rises. The mixture enters the stilling chamber, which is designed to reduce flow velocity, allowing the air bubbles to separate from the water by buoyancy. The compressed air leaves the chamber through another vertical pipe, called the raiser pipe, and the water leaves through a submerged drain near the bottom of the stilling chamber.

The main issue with these compressors is the development of the scale and dimensions of the chamber (compressed air storage). The price of the chamber can be more costly than the installation itself, depending on the size. Despite the relatively high cost of energy, the hydraulic compressor uses significantly less electricity and increases the production of renewable energy resources.

== Cost Breakdown ==
Fig 2: Energy Cost, Compressor Cost, Maintenance Cost
(Based on 24/7 operation, $0.08/kWh, full load operation).

Most of the expenses from integrating a compressor is the energy cost, as depicted in figure 2. The main factors are the type and size of the compressor. That is what determines the utility and power draw of the machine. To be most efficient, the air production capacity should match the air requirements to avoid bottlenecks and unnecessary energy being lost in the form of heat when the air is released. By optimizing utilization or preventing leakage, companies can increase their profit margins.

The design of the piping can also affect the cost of the system. A pipe structure without sharp corners or dead-heads can help maintain pressure and an efficient passage for compressed air. Designers have to think about the type of material that will be used in the hydraulic system. Aluminum, for example, has a lower weight and corrosion resistance than the more traditional material, steel. Because it is much lighter than steel, aluminum pipes allow welders and technicians to manufacture and install them easier. The diameter of the pipe is also crucial since smaller diameters tend to have more pressure differential. That would cause more pressure energy to be converted to heat or vibration, thereby decreasing the compressor's lifespan

== Efficiency ==
To calculate the compressed airflow power, the equation $W=mRT*ln(\beta)$ can be used to measure the maximum efficiency of a hydraulic compressor. However, in a real-world scenario, airflow loss needs to be accounted for. This can be done by applying the energy conservation equation for an isothermal flow (assuming water and air have the same pressure and velocity): $loss = m[RT*ln(P0/P1)-V^2/2]$. Many other factors can also cause the loss of air, such as collision against walls or the friction between water and air bubbles.

The flow of compressed air produced increases when the mass flow rate of liquid circulating the system also increases. This flow can be calculated only at specific parts of the hydraulic pump, as various configurations can be implemented. Examples of these configurations include a parallel or series pumping arrangement. The pump curve can be defined using a derivation of the quadratic equation: $Q = -b\pm*\surd(b^2-4a(c-H))/2a$. The equation calculates the efficiency of the pump head or driver, which can be graphed with electrical power consumed to compare hydraulic systems.

== See also ==
- Airlift pump – Pump using density difference due to injected air in the liquid. The opposite effect.
- Compressor – Machine to increase pressure of gas by reducing its volume
- Compressed air – Air under a pressure greater than atmospheric
- Pneumatics – Use of pressurised gas in mechanical systems
- Pneumatic tool, also known as Air tool – Tool driven by compressed air supplied by an air compressor
- Hydraulic power (disambiguation)
- Hydropower – Power generation via movement of water
- Fluid power – Use of fluids under pressure to generate, control, and transmit power
