= 37 mm McClean Automatic Cannon Mk. III =

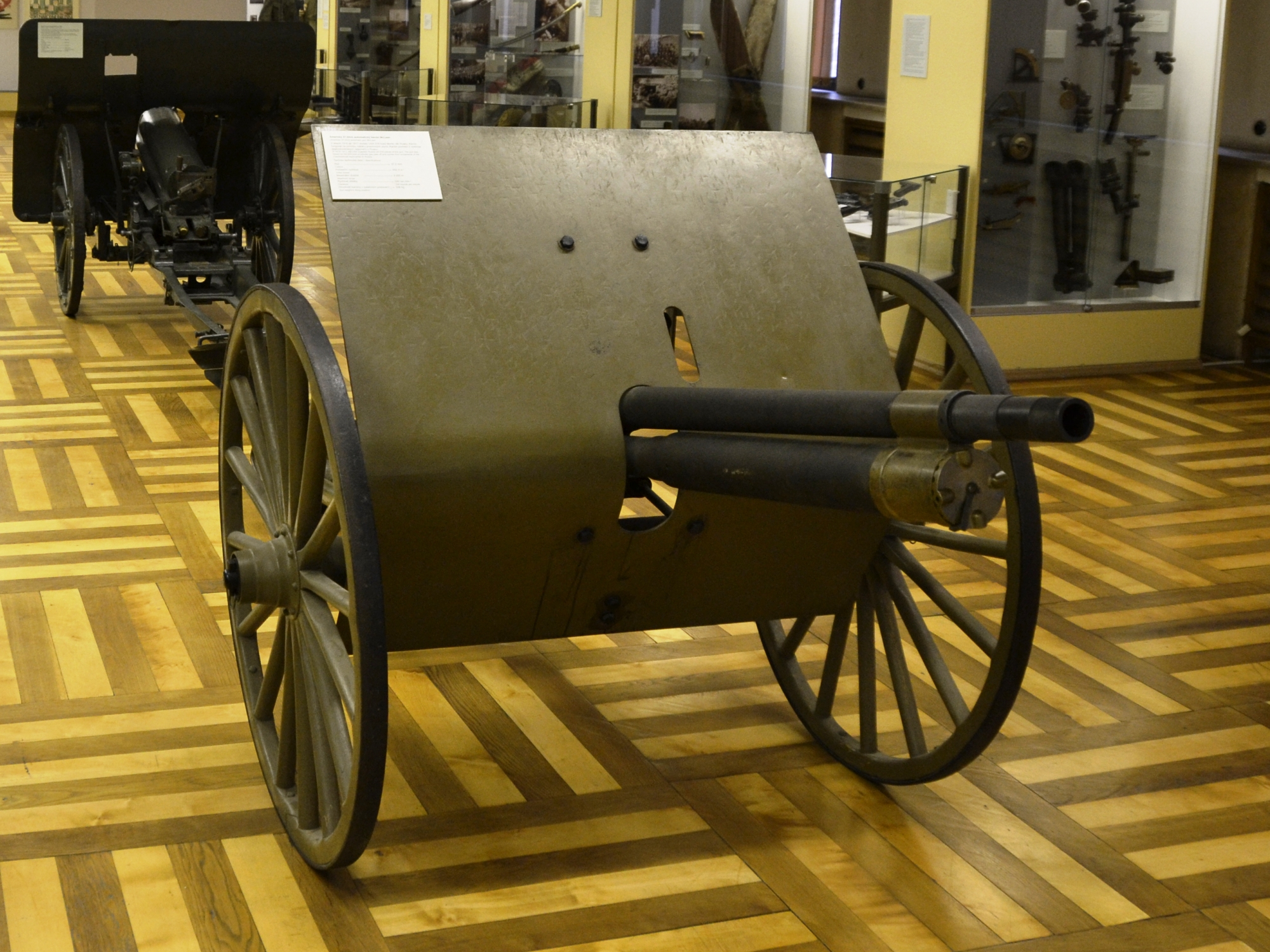
- A Mk. III captured by the Czechoslovak Legion at the Army Museum Žižkov (Prague).
- Type: Infantry support gun Naval Gun; Anti-tank gun
- Place of origin: United States

Service history
- Used by: See users
- Wars: World War I Russian Civil War; Finnish Civil War; Soviet-Polish War; Winter War; Spanish Civil War

Production history
- Designer: Samuel McClean
- Designed: 1902
- Manufacturer: Poole Engineering Company
- Produced: 1916
- No. built: 268
- Variants: Mk I, Mk II, Mk III, Mk IV

Specifications
- Mass: 307 kg (677 lb)
- Barrel length: 1.8 m (5 ft 11 in) L/50
- Shell: Fixed QF 37 x 137R mm
- Shell weight: 450 g (1 lb)
- Caliber: 37.2 mm (1.46 in)
- Recoil: Hydro-spring
- Carriage: Split-trail
- Elevation: -5° to +15°
- Rate of fire: 50-100 rpm cyclic
- Muzzle velocity: 650 m/s (2,100 ft/s)
- Effective firing range: 2.3 km (1.4 mi)
- Maximum firing range: 5.3 km (3.3 mi) at +15°

The 37 mm McClean Automatic Cannon Mk. III was a light artillery piece produced in the United States during World War I for the Imperial Russian Army.

== History ==
The design of the McClean automatic cannon Mk. I began in 1902 as a private venture by the McClean Ordnance and Arms Company. The Mk. I was tested by the US Army during 1903-1904 at the Sandy Hook Proving Grounds and despite Army enthusiasm, it did not pass testing and was not adopted by the Army. During testing, there were numerous jams, component failures, and the automatic operating system never performed as designed.

McClean enlisted the help of the Poole Engineering Company to produce a redesigned version known as the Mk. II and this was tested in 1905 and rejected a second time due to technical deficiencies relating to the automatic operating system. With the failure of the Mk. II McClean enlisted the help of the Driggs Ordnance Company to redesign the gun and work continued until 1909 when McClean shelved the project due to a lack of commercial interest.

With the outbreak of the First World War, the Imperial Russian Army requested proposals from American arms companies to supply them with arms. McClean would have to wait until 1916 to submit his substantially modified Mk. III gun to the Russians and in 1916 an order for 300 guns were received. 268 guns were produced by the Poole Engineering Co of which 218 were delivered to Russia before the Russian Revolution in 1917. The 50 undelivered guns were offered to the US Navy but the proposal met with no interest and they were placed in storage and their fate is unknown. The stored guns may have been delivered to the UK in 1940/41 and issued to Home Guard units; there is an example on display at the Heugh Battery Museum, Hartlepool.

== Design ==
The McClean Mk. III was intended as an infantry support gun or as a landing gun for amphibious operations. In the infantry support role, it would have been used in loopholing operations to neutralize enemy machine guns in pillboxes. However, their light weight, low profile, and high velocity would have made them useful anti-tank guns against early lightly armored tanks.

The founder of the company Samuel McClean designed the gas-operated long-stroke gas piston, a rotating open bolt operating system used by the Lewis Gun, and this operating system was also used for McClean's automatic cannon. The system operated by tapping gasses near the muzzle which actuated a piston to load and extract cartridges. The variable gas system controlled the rate of fire.

The Mk. III had a split-trail carriage, hydro-spring recoil system, two wooden-spoked steel-rimmed wheels, gun shield, muzzle brake, and seat attached to the trails for the gunner. There was also a naval version mounted on an elastic center pivot mount. The Mk. III was fed from a vertical 5- or 10-round magazine and it fired the same fixed QF 37mm ammunition as the Hotchkiss guns already in US service. The use of this black powder ammunition may have contributed to the early model's reliability problems due to fouling. In 1919 a revised McClean Mk. IV gun using smokeless powder was proposed as an anti-aircraft gun on a modified HA/LA field carriage but by that time the war had ended and there were no customers.

== Users ==
- Russian Empire – In service they were known by several names usually with the name McClean transliterated such as Maklen 37 mm Puschka ob. 1917g.
- Soviet Union – Surviving guns remained in service with the Red Army and participated in the Russian Civil War on both sides. It may have also been used during the Soviet-Polish War and the Finnish Civil Wars.
- Czechoslovakia – During the Russian Civil War the Czechoslovak Legion captured approximately 50 guns and continued to operate them until the 1930s.
- Finland – 4 captured guns are believed to have been used as late as the Winter War by Finland.
- Spanish Republic – The Soviets supplied 30 Mk. III guns to the Spanish Republic in 1936 at 16,359 pesetas per gun. In Spanish service, they were often used as anti-tank guns.

== Gallery ==
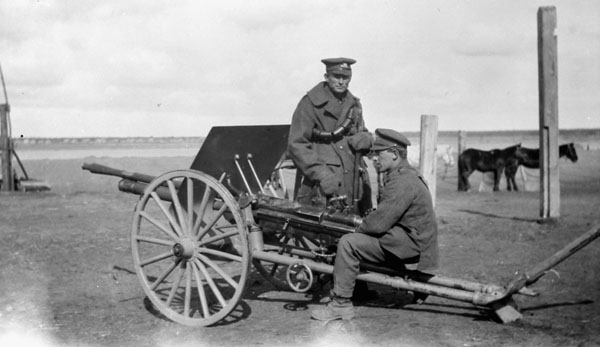
A Mk. III in service with Canadian troops during the North Russia intervention 1919.

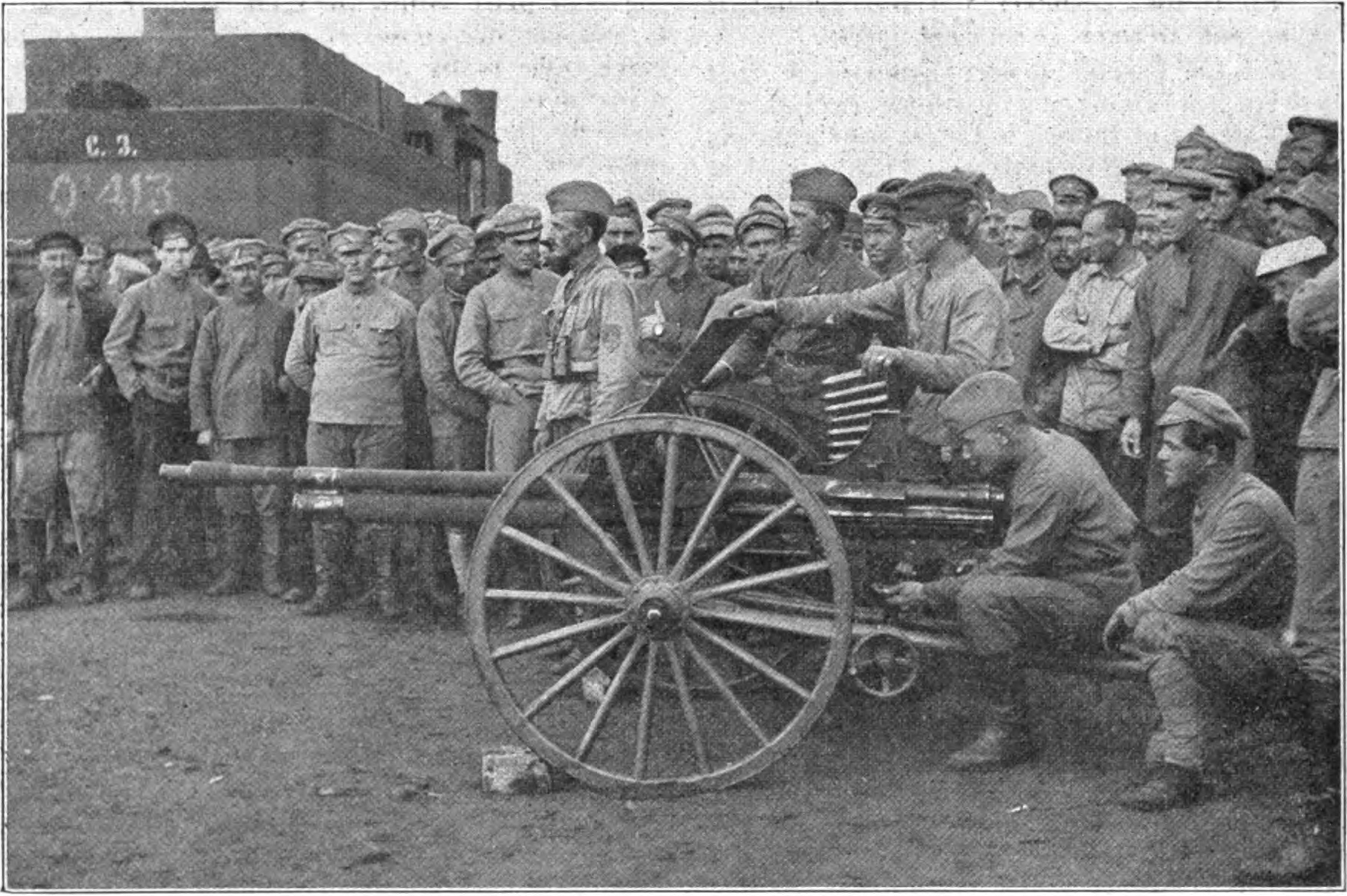
The Czech Legion with a gun captured at Penza.

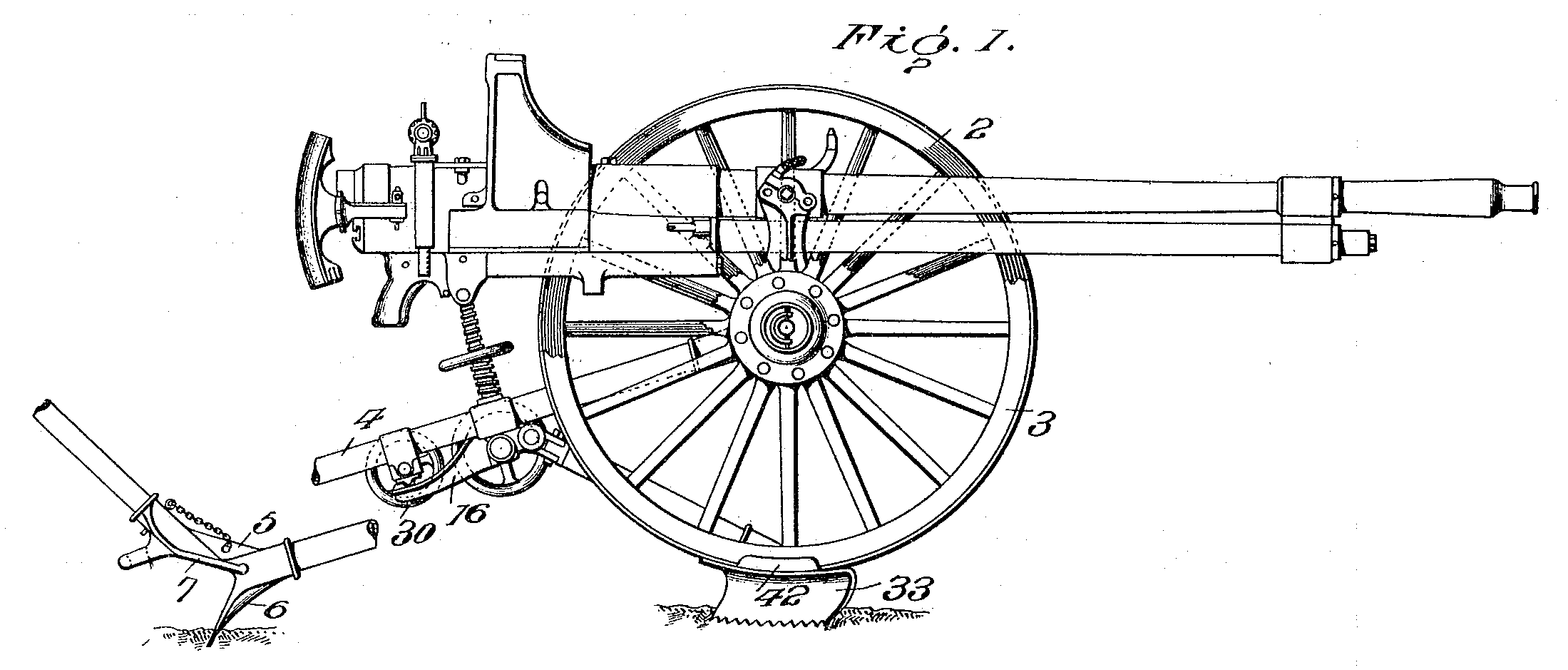
A line drawing from the patent submission.

== See also ==
- 37 mm Infantry Gun Model 1917 - A similar American made infantry support gun produced in limited numbers for the US Army.
- Canon d'Infanterie de 37 modèle 1916 TRP - A French made infantry support gun used by the US Army during World War I.
