= Grille (artillery) =

German self-propelled gun

Grille Ausf. K
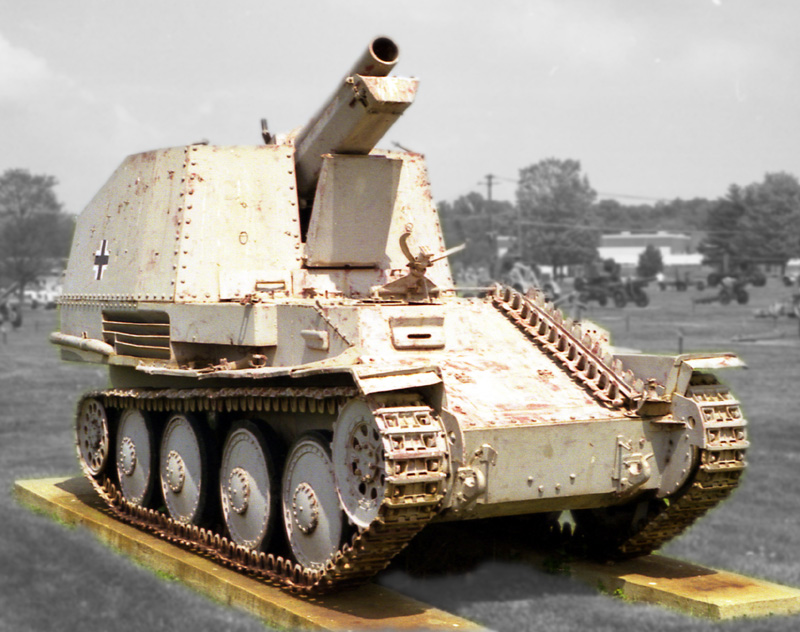
- Grille Ausf. K on display at the US Army Ordnance Museum.
- Type: Self propelled artillery
- Place of origin: Nazi Germany

Service history
- In service: 1943–1945
- Wars: World War II

Production history
- Produced: 1943 - 1944
- No. built: 389
- Variants: ammunition carrier

Specifications
- Mass: 11.5 tonnes
- Length: 4.95 m (16 ft 3 in)
- Width: 2.15 m (7 ft 1 in)
- Height: 2.47 m (8 ft 1 in)
- Crew: 5
- Armor: 10 mm - 15 mm
- Main armament: 1 × 15 cm sIG 33; 15 rounds
- Secondary armament: 1 × 7.92 mm MG 34; 600 rounds
- Engine: 1 x Praga AC, 6-cylinder petrol engine 147 hp (110 kW)
- Suspension: Leaf spring
- Operational range: 190 km (120 mi)
- Maximum speed: 35 km/h (22 mph)

The 15 cm sIG 33 (Sf) auf Panzerkampfwagen 38(t), also known as Grille (German: "cricket") was a series of self-propelled artillery vehicles used by Nazi Germany during World War II. The Grille series was based on the Czech Panzer 38(t) tank chassis and used a 15 cm sIG 33 infantry gun.

== Development ==
The original order for 200 units of the Grille, was to be based on the new 38(t) Ausf. M chassis that BMM (Böhmisch-Mährische Maschinenfabrik) was developing, however, delays caused production to start on the 38(t) Ausf. H chassis.

=== Grille Ausf. H ===
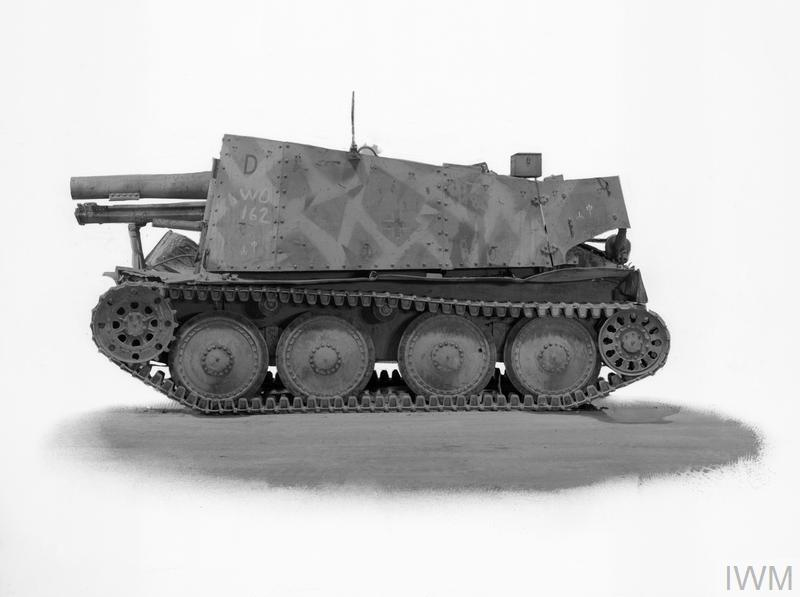
Side view of Grille Ausf. H

The first variant of the Grille was based on the Panzer 38(t) Ausf. H chassis, which had its engine in the rear. Instead of a turret, the vehicle had a low-slung superstructure and fighting compartment. The 15 cm (5.9 in) schweres Infanteriegeschütz 33 (heavy infantry gun) was mounted in the front of this armored compartment. Being built on a tank chassis, its hull armour was 50 mm (2.0 in) at the front and its superstructure armour was 25 mm (0.98 in) at the front.

A total of 200 (including one prototype) were produced in the BMM (erstwhile ČKD Praga) factory in Prague from February to June 1943, and 10 more units were built in November 1943. The official designation was 15 cm Schweres Infanteriegeschütz 33 (Sf) auf Panzerkampfwagen 38(t) Ausf. H (Sd.Kfz. 138/1).

=== Grille Ausf. K ===
The second Grille variant was very similar to the Marder III Ausf M, using the same modified Panzer 38(t) chassis which was specifically re-designed for self-propelled mounts. The engine was relocated to the center of the vehicle behind an extended sloped glacis plate, both permitting the gun to be mounted at the rear and better protecting the crew. The fighting compartment at the rear of the vehicle was somewhat smaller and higher than in the previous version. Because there was no engine in the rear, the fighting compartment could be lowered down to the bottom floor level where the engine used to be, which decreased crew exposure and visibility. The main gun was also the 15 cm (5.9 in) schweres Infanteriegeschütz 33.

From December 1943 to September 1944, a total of 162 vehicles were produced. Further 17 vehicles were built in 1945 for an overall production of 179. The official designation was 15 cm Schweres Infanteriegeschütz 33/1 auf Selbstfahrlafette 38(t) (Sf) Ausf. M (Sd.Kfz. 138/1)

=== Ammunition carrier ===
As the Grille had limited ammunition storage, a dedicated variant of the Grille Ausf. K was built as Munitionspanzer 38(t) (Sf) Ausf. K (Sd.Kfz. 138/1). It carried ammunition racks instead of the main gun, but could be converted back to normal configuration in the field by mounting the 15 cm (5.9 in) gun onto it. Production totaled 102 vehicles.

== Combat history ==
Both versions were intended to take service in the schwere Infanteriegeschütz Companies within the Panzergrenadier regiments, inside Panzer and Panzergrenadier Divisions, in their heavy infantry gun units. Each detachment had six available.

== Surviving vehicles ==
- A Grille Ausf. K is in storage at the U.S. Army Artillery Museum at Fort Sill, US.
- A Munitionspanzer 38(t) is on display at the U.S. Army Artillery Museum at Fort Sill, US.
