= 15 cm sIG 33 (Sf) auf Panzerkampfwagen I Ausf B =

German self-propelled gun

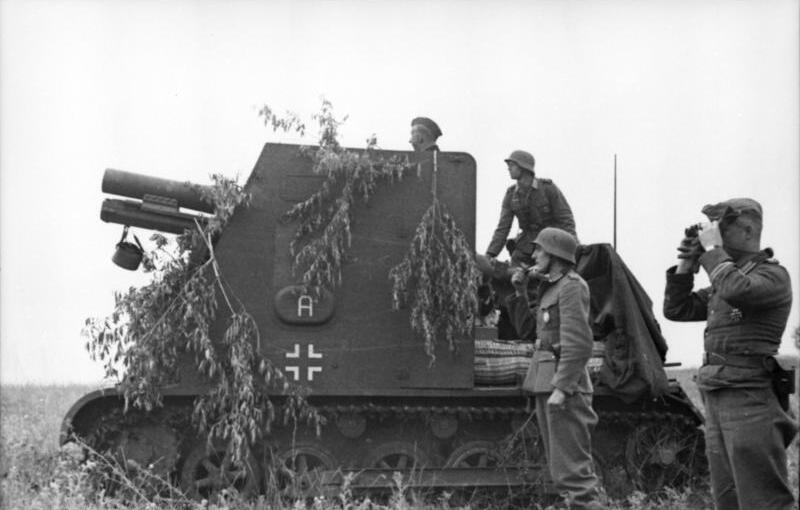
- A sIG 33 (Sf) on a Pz.Kpfw. I chassis in Russia, 1942
- Type: Self-propelled gun
- Place of origin: Nazi Germany

Service history
- In service: 1940 - 1943
- Used by: Nazi Germany
- Wars: World War II

Production history
- Designed: 1939-1940
- Manufacturer: Alkett
- Produced: February 1940
- No. built: 38 converted

Specifications
- Mass: 8.5 tonnes (8.4 long tons; 9.4 short tons)
- Length: 4.67 metres (15 ft 4 in)
- Width: 2.06 metres (6 ft 9 in)
- Height: 2.8 metres (9 ft 2 in)
- Crew: 4
- Armor: 13 mm - 5 mm
- Main armament: 1× 15 cm schweres Infanteriegeschütz 33
- Engine: 6-cylinder, water-cooled Maybach NL38 TR; 100 horsepower (75 kW)
- Transmission: 5 forward, 1 reverse gears
- Operational range: 140 kilometres (87 mi)
- Maximum speed: 40 km/h (25 mph)

The 15 cm sIG 33 (Sf) auf Panzerkampfwagen I Ausf B, sometimes referred to (unofficially) as the Sturmpanzer I Bison, was a German self-propelled gun used during World War II.

== Development and history ==
The invasion of Poland had shown that the towed sIG 33 guns assigned to the infantry gun companies of the motorized infantry regiments had difficulties keeping up with the tanks during combat. The easiest solution was to modify a spare tank chassis to carry it into battle. A sIG 33 was mounted on the chassis of the Panzer I Ausf. B, complete with carriage and wheels, in place of the turret and superstructure. Plates 13 mm (0.51 in) thick were used to form a tall, open-topped fighting compartment on the forward part of the hull. This protected little more than the gun and the gunner himself from small arms fire and shell fragments, the loaders being completely exposed. The rearmost section of armor was hinged to ease reloading.

There was no room to stow any ammunition, so it had to be carried by a separate vehicle. When mounted, the sIG 33 had a total traverse of 25° and could elevate from -4° to +75°. The gun used an Rblf36 sight. The chassis was overloaded and breakdowns were frequent. The vehicle's extreme height and lack of on-board ammunition were severe tactical drawbacks.

Thirty-eight were converted in February 1940 by Alkett.

== Combat use ==
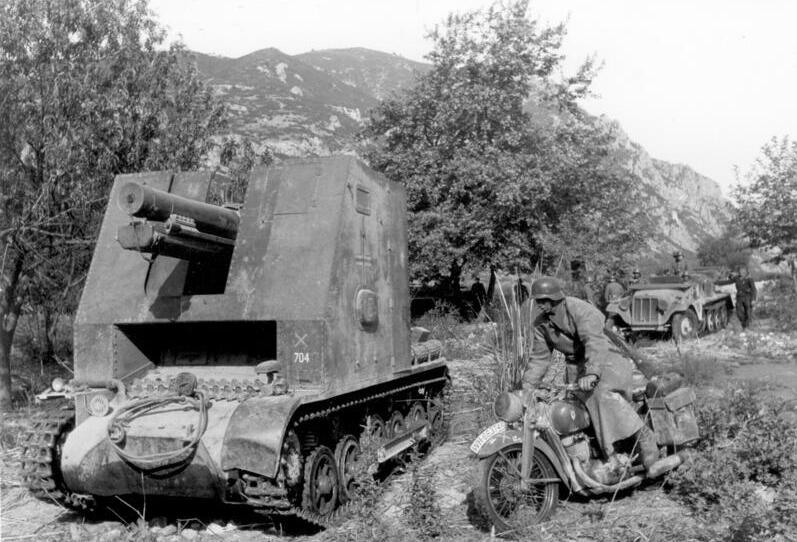
A sIG 33 auf Panzerkampfwagen I in Greece in 1941

36 vehicles were organized into independent schwere Infanteriegeschütz-Kompanie (mot.S.) ("self-propelled heavy infantry gun companies") numbers 701–706, assigned to Panzer divisions in the Battle of France as follows:

- Company 701, to the 9th Panzer Division
- Company 702, to the 1st Panzer Division
- Company 703, to the 2nd Panzer Division
- Company 704, to the 5th Panzer Division
- Company 705, to the 7th Panzer Division
- Company 706, to the 10th Panzer Division

As part of the 5th Panzer Division, assigned to the German XIVth Motorized Army Corps, the 704th company participated in Operation Marita, the invasion of the Balkans.

Later in 1941, the same assignment was maintained for Operation Barbarossa, the invasion of the Soviet Union. The 705th and 706th belonging to the 7th and 10th Panzer Divisions respectively, were destroyed at this time. Of the remaining companies, only the 701st participated in the opening stages of the subsequent Case Blue in 1942, although it, and its parent 9th Panzer Division, were transferred to Army Group Center by the end of the summer of 1942.

The last reference to these vehicles is with the 704th Company of the 5th Panzer Division during the middle of 1943.
