= 37 mm Infantry Gun Model 1917 =

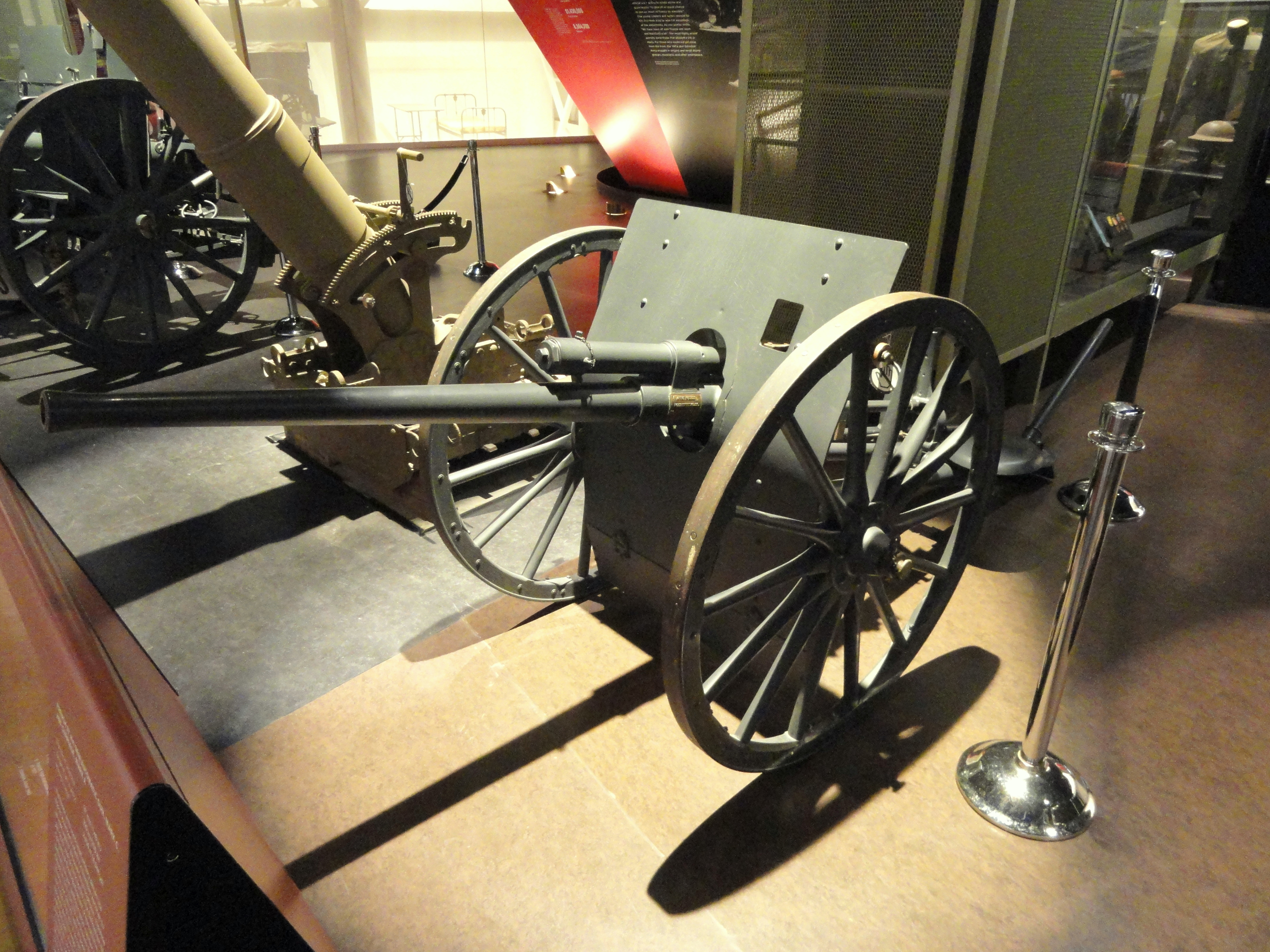
- A M1917 at the National World War I Museum at Kansas City, USA.
- Type: Infantry support gun Anti-tank gun
- Place of origin: United States

Service history
- Used by: France; United States
- Wars: World War I

Production history
- Designed: 1916
- Manufacturer: Bethlehem Steel
- Produced: 1916
- No. built: 185

Specifications
- Mass: 973 lb (441 kg)
- Barrel length: 5 ft 8 in (1.73 m) L/47
- Shell: Fixed QF
- Shell weight: 1 lb (450 g)
- Caliber: 1.5 in (37 mm)
- Breech: Vertical sliding wedge
- Recoil: Hydro-spring
- Carriage: Split-trail
- Elevation: -5° to +15°
- Traverse: 45°
- Muzzle velocity: 2,100 ft/s (640 m/s)
- Maximum firing range: 2.3 mi (3.7 km)

The 37 mm Infantry Gun Model 1917 was a light artillery piece produced in the United States during World War I for the French Army. It was adopted by the US Army when it entered the war on the side of the Allies.

== History ==
The design was a private venture by Bethlehem Steel and was offered to the French in 1916 under the designation One-pounder 37 mm Semi-automatic Gun, Mark C on Carriage Mark A. It was intended as an infantry support gun or as a landing gun for amphibious operations. In the infantry support role, it would have been used in loopholing operations to neutralize enemy machine guns in pillboxes.

It is believed the French ordered 200 guns in 1916, 100 during 1917 and another 1,000 during 1918. However, the exact number that were delivered or how many entered French service is unknown. The first 15 entered service in October 1917 and 80 were in service in January 1918. They were used as anti-tank guns in dedicated batteries (several German ex-British tanks were destroyed by such batteries).

In July 1918 the US ordnance department accepted an offer from the French to sell 200 guns produced by Bethlehem Steel to the US Army. The US Army agreed to take over the French order assuming they would be receiving the Canon d'Infanterie de 37 modèle 1916 TRP which the US Army had already accepted for service. However, when the first batch of 75 was delivered to the AEF in France it was discovered that it was a completely different gun which used its own incompatible ammunition. The AEF agreed to accept the next 110 guns that were in the process of being completed and gave them the designation of 37 mm Infantry Gun Model 1917. The AEF may have not used the M1917 in action. So the 185 guns the US Army acquired were the product of an administrative error.

The Army couldn't envision a use for them and since few were acquired they were declared obsolete in 1921 and retired from service. However, their light weight, low profile and high velocity would have made it a useful anti-tank gun.

== Design ==
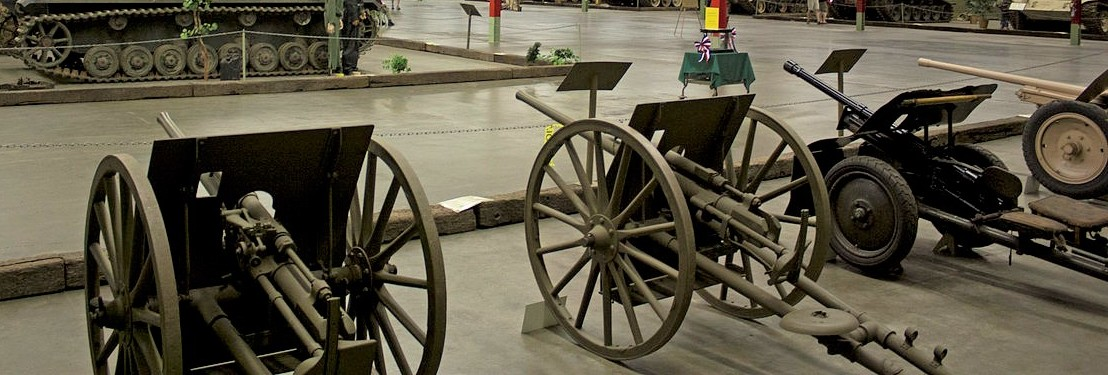
Two M1917's at the American Armored Foundation Museum at Danville, Virginia.

The Model 1917 featured a forged one piece nickel steel barrel with a semi-automatic vertical sliding wedge breech. The split-trail carriage had a hydro-spring recoil system, two wooden spoked wheels and fired Fixed QF ammunition. The gun was light enough that traverse and elevation could be controlled from a stock attached to the breech of the gun. There was also a seat attached to the trails for the gunner.

The French realised that its Gun laying system was defective and had to use the sight of the 37 modèle 1916 TRP.

== See also ==
- 37 mm McClean Automatic Cannon Mk. III - A similar American made infantry support gun produced in limited numbers for the Imperial Russian Army.
