= 15 cm sIG 33 =

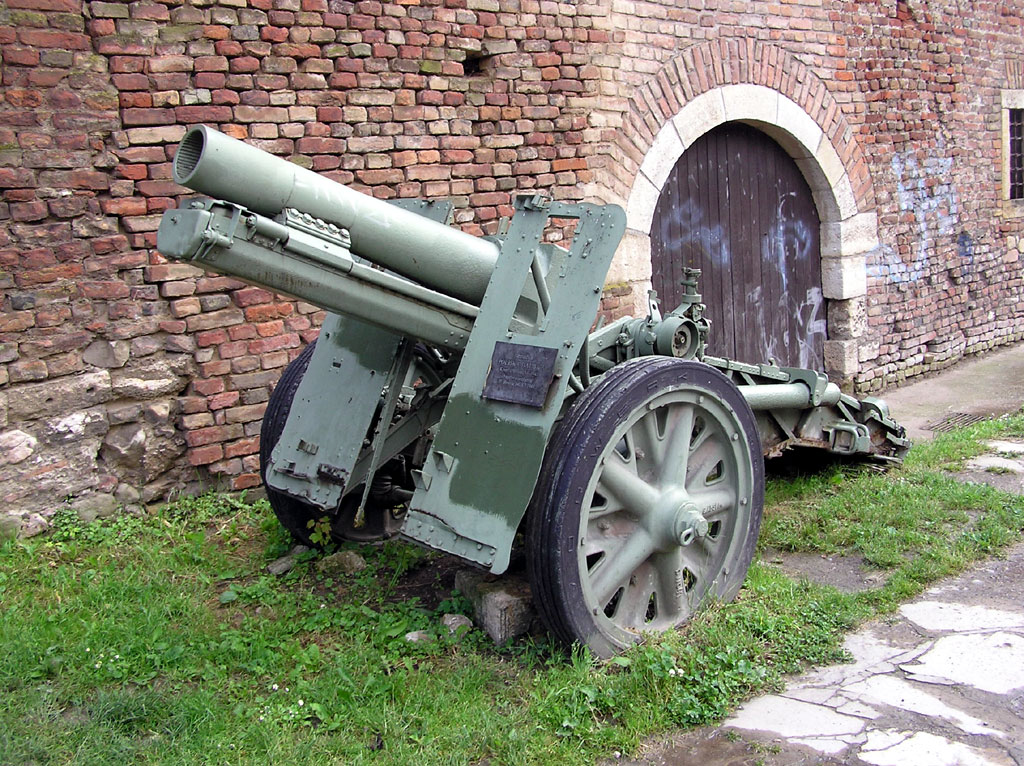
- A sIG 33 at the Belgrade Military Museum, Serbia
- Type: Heavy infantry gun
- Place of origin: Weimar Republic

Service history
- In service: 1927–1945
- Used by: Nazi Germany
- Wars: World War II

Production history
- Designer: Rheinmetall
- Designed: 1927–33
- Manufacturer: Rheinmetall, AEG-Fabriken, Bohemisch Waffenfabrik
- Produced: 1936–1945
- No. built: around 4,600
- Variants: sIG 33/1

Specifications
- Mass: 1,800 kg (4,000 lb)
- Length: 4.42 m (14 ft 6 in)
- Barrel length: 1.65 m (5 ft 5 in) L/11
- Width: 2.06 m (6 ft 9 in)
- Shell: cased separate-loading (6 charges)
- Caliber: 149.1 mm (5.87 in)
- Breech: horizontal sliding-block
- Recoil: hydro-pneumatic
- Carriage: box trail
- Elevation: 0° to +73° or -4° to +75°
- Traverse: 11.5°
- Rate of fire: 2-3 rounds per minute
- Muzzle velocity: 240 m/s (790 ft/s) (HE)
- Effective firing range: 4,700 m (5,100 yd)
- Sights: Rblf36

The 15 cm sIG 33 (German: schweres Infanteriegeschütz 33, lit. "heavy infantry gun") was the standard German heavy infantry gun used during the Second World War. It was the largest weapon ever classified as an infantry gun by any nation.

Its weight made it difficult to use in the field, and the gun was increasingly adapted to various ad hoc mobile mountings, which were generically referred to as the SIG 33.

== Development ==
Sources differ on the development history, but the gun itself was of conventional design. Early production models were horse-drawn, with wooden wheels. Later production models had pressed steel wheels, with solid rubber tires and air brakes for motor towing, albeit at a low speed (only carriages with pneumatic tires and suspension system could be towed at highway speeds). As with most German artillery carriages, the solid rubber tires and lack of springing meant that the gun could not safely be towed above 10 mph, and horse-drawing was still extensively employed.

The sIG 33 was rather heavy for its mission, and it was redesigned in the late 1930s to incorporate light alloys. This saved about 150 kg (330 pounds), the outbreak of war forced the return to the original design before more than a few hundred were made, as the Luftwaffe had a higher priority for light alloys. A new carriage, made entirely of light alloys, was tested around 1939, but was not accepted for service.

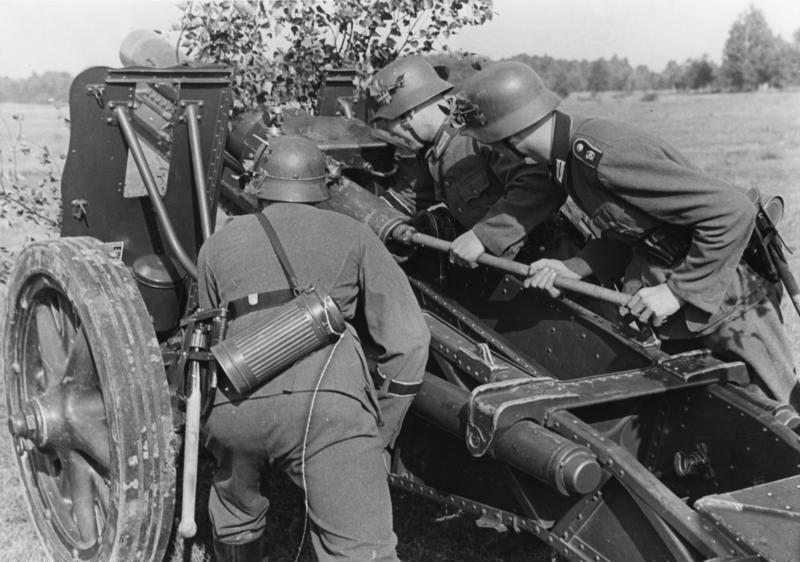
Artillerymen of the Großdeutschland Division loading a sIG 33

== Ammunition ==
Most of the shells used by the sIG 33 were unexceptional in design. The Stielgranate 42 was an exception. The finned projectile was mounted in front of and outside the barrel on a muzzle-loaded driving rod, and fired with a special propellant charge. The projectile had a range of about a 1,000 metres (1,100 yd), with the rod separating at about 150 metres (160 yd). The Stielgranate 42 was designed for demolition and obstacle clearance, unlike the previous anti-tank Stielgranate 41.

Shell	Type	Weight	Filler
I Gr 33	HE	38 kilograms (84 lb)	8.3 kilograms (18 lb) amatol
I Gr 38 Nb	Smoke	40 kilograms (88 lb)	oleum/pumice
I Gr 39 Hl/A	Hollow-charge	25.5 kilograms (56 lb)	cyclonite/TNT
Stielgranate 42	Demolition	90 kilograms (200 lb)	54 kilograms (119 lb) amatol

== See also ==
- SIG 33 Self-Propelled Artillery
- 152 mm mortar M1931 (NM)
