= Sturmtiger =

Sturmmörserwagen 606/4 mit 38 cm RW 61
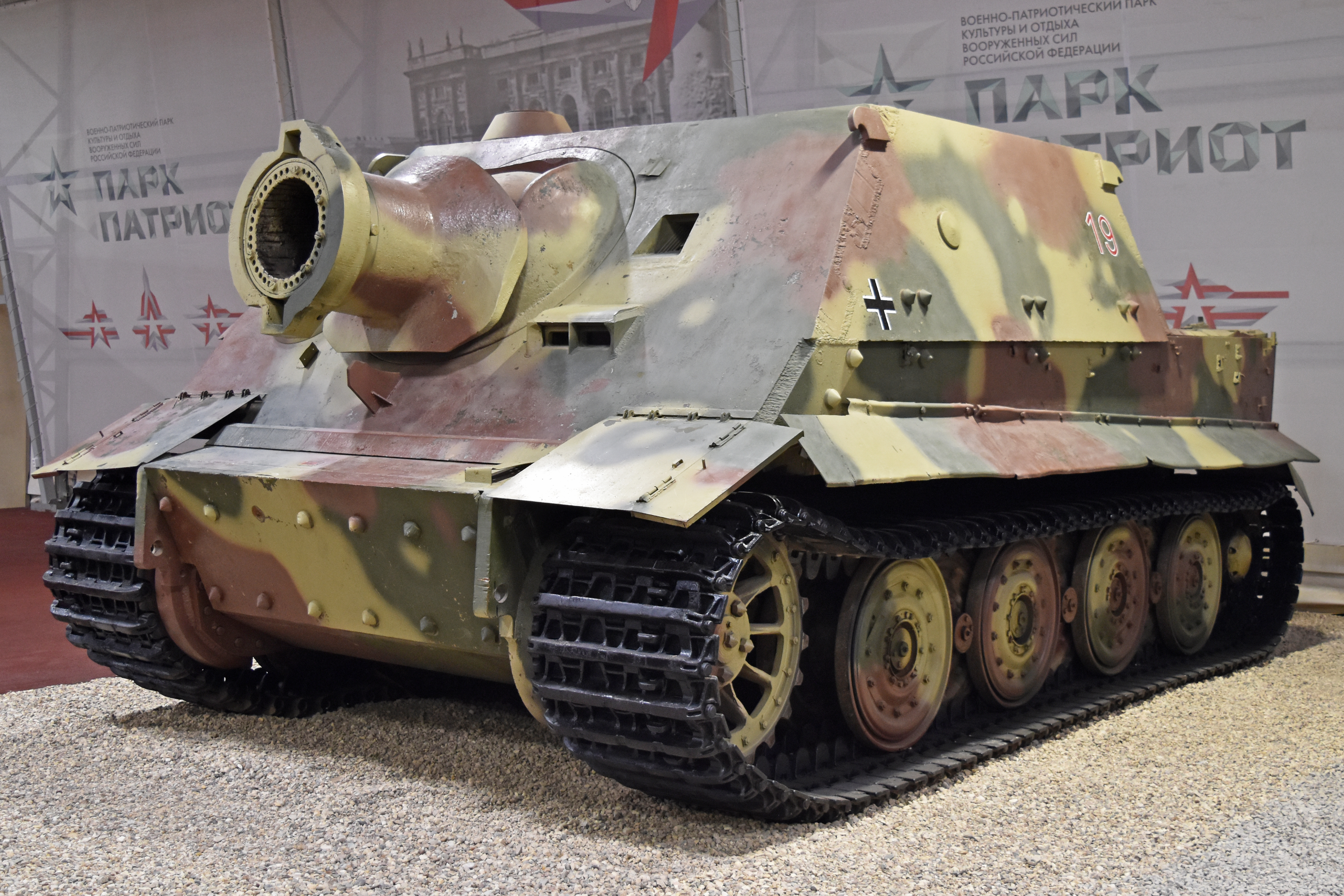
- A Sturmtiger on display at the Kubinka Tank Museum in Russia
- Type: Heavy assault gun
- Place of origin: Nazi Germany

Service history
- In service: August 1944–1945
- Wars: World War II

Production history
- Designer: Alkett
- Designed: 1943–1944
- Manufacturer: Alkett
- Produced: October 1943 – January 1945
- No. built: 18 (using rebuilt Tiger I chassis)

Specifications
- Mass: 68 tonnes (75 short tons; 67 long tons)
- Length: 6.28 m (20 ft 7 in)
- Width: 3.57 m (11 ft 9 in)
- Height: 2.85 m (9 ft 4 in)
- Crew: 5 driver radio operator loader 2nd loader commander / gunner
- Armor: max. 150 mm (superstructure front, at 47° from vertical) min. 62 mm
- Main armament: 380 mm RW 61 rocket launcher L/5.4 (14 rounds)
- Secondary armament: 1x 7.92 mm MG 34
- Engine: Maybach HL230 P45 V-12, water-cooled gasoline 700 PS (690 hp, 515 kW)
- Power/weight: 10.77 PS/tonne
- Suspension: torsion-bar
- Fuel capacity: 540 L (120 imp gal; 140 US gal)
- Operational range: 120 km (75 mi)
- Maximum speed: 40 km/h (25 mph)

Sturmtiger (German for 'Assault Tiger') was a World War II German assault gun built on the Tiger I chassis and armed with a 380mm rocket-propelled mortar. The official German designation was Sturmmörserwagen 606/4 mit 38 cm RW 61. Its primary task was to provide heavy fire support for infantry units fighting in urban areas. The few vehicles produced fought in the Warsaw Uprising, the Battle of the Bulge and the Battle of the Reichswald. The fighting vehicle was known by various informal names, among which the Sturmtiger became the most popular.

== Development ==
The idea for a heavy infantry support vehicle capable of demolishing heavily defended buildings or fortified areas with a single shot came out of the experiences of the heavy urban fighting in the Battle of Stalingrad in 1942. At the time, the Wehrmacht had only the Sturm-Infanteriegeschütz 33B available for destroying buildings, a Sturmgeschütz III variant armed with a 15 cm sIG 33 heavy infantry gun. Twelve of them were lost in the fighting at Stalingrad. Its successor, the Sturmpanzer IV, also known by Allies as Brummbär, was in production from early 1943. This was essentially an improved version of the earlier design, mounting a StuH 43 L/12 gun of the same caliber on the Panzer IV chassis with greatly improved armour protection.

While greatly improved compared to the earlier models, by this time infantry anti-tank weapons were improving dramatically, and the Wehrmacht still saw a need for a similar, but more heavily armoured and armed vehicle. Therefore, a decision was made to create a new vehicle based on the Tiger tank and arm it with a 210 mm howitzer. However, this weapon turned out not to be available at the time and was therefore replaced by a 380 mm rocket launcher, which was adapted from a Kriegsmarine depth charge launcher.

In September 1943 plans were made for Krupp to fabricate new Tiger I armoured hulls for the Sturmtiger. The Tiger I hulls were to be sent to Henschel for chassis assembly and then to Alkett where the superstructures would be mounted. The first prototype was ready and presented to Adolf Hitler in October 1943. Delivery of the first hulls would occur in December 1943, with the first three Sturmtiger completed by Alkett by 20 February 1944.

Due to delays, Hitler did not request production of the weapon until 19 April 1944; twelve superstructures and weapons would be prepared and mounted on rebuilt Tiger I chassis. The first three production series Sturmtiger were completed by Alkett in August 1944. Plans to complete an additional seven from 15 to 21 September 1944 were presented to Hitler in a conference on 18–20 August 1944. Ten Sturmtiger were produced in September, along with an additional five in December 1944.

Hitler had laid great importance on the special employment of the Sturmtiger and believed it would be necessary to produce at least 300 rounds of ammunition per month.

== Design ==
The Sturmtiger was based on the late model Tiger I, keeping its hull and suspension. The front of the Tiger's superstructure was removed to make room for the new fixed casemate-style fighting compartment housing the rocket launcher. This was located directly at the front of the vehicle, giving it a boxy appearance.

Compared to the Tiger tank, the Sturmtiger was much shorter overall, only 6.28 m (20 ft 7 in) compared to the Tiger's 8.45 m (27 ft 9 in), due largely to the fact that it did not have the long main gun of the latter which protruded far in front of the hull. It also was slightly lower than the Tiger at 2.85 m (9 ft 4 in) compared to 3 m (9 ft 10 in).

=== Armour ===
Since the Sturmtiger was intended for use in urban areas in close range street fighting, it needed to be heavily armoured to survive. Its sloped (at 47° from vertical) frontal armor therefore was 150 mm (5.9 in) thick, while its superstructure side and rear plates were 82 mm (3.2 in) thick. The hull front was 100 millimetres (3.9 in) or 150 millimetres (5.9 in) if it had an additional armor plate fitted. This pushed the weight of the vehicle up from the 57 t (56 long tons; 63 short tons) of the Tiger I to 68 t (67 long tons; 75 short tons).

Armor layout of Sturmtiger

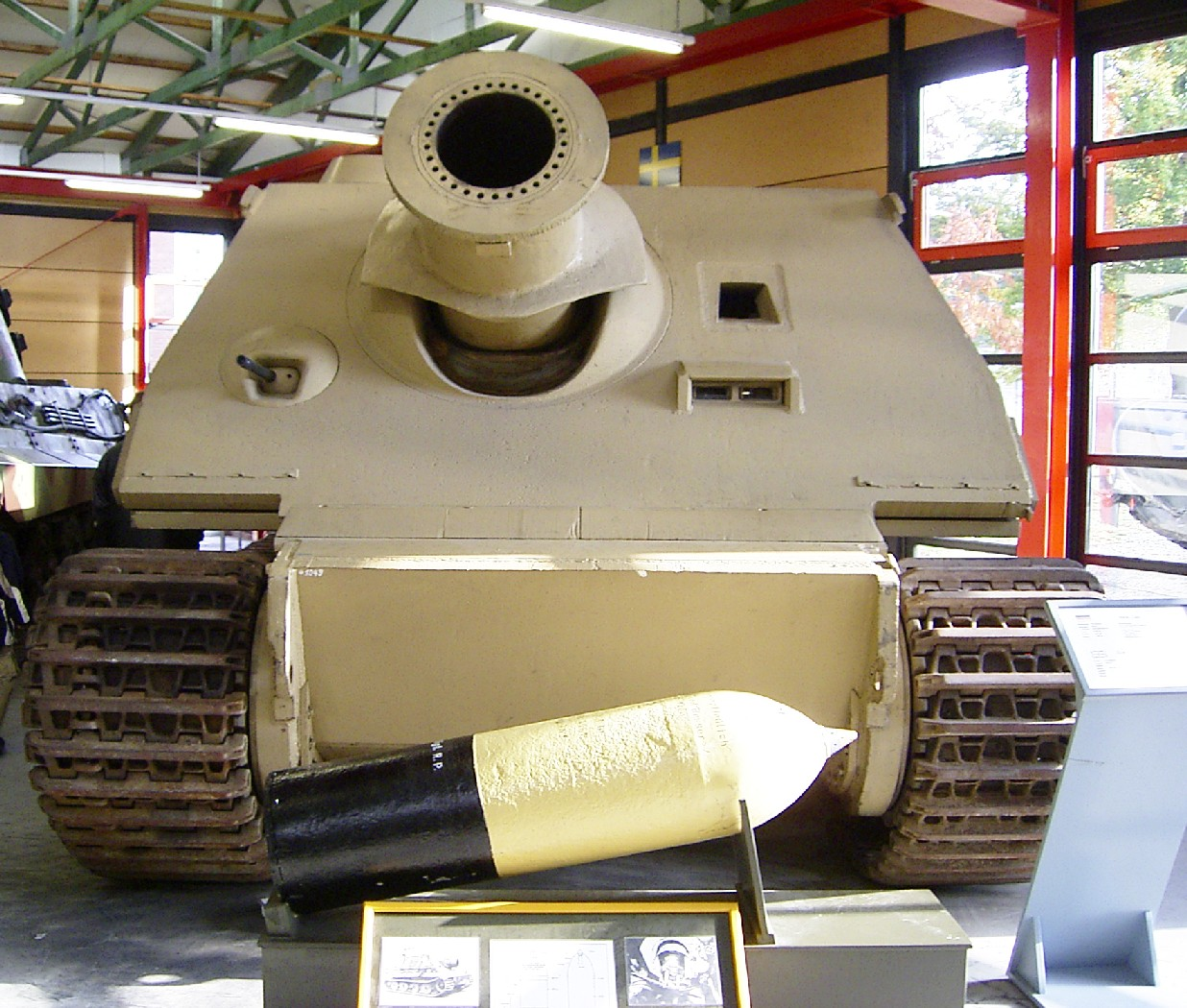
Sturmtiger in the Deutsches Panzermuseum. In the front is the main 380 mm caliber rocket-propelled projectile.

Armour thickness	Location	Slope (angle from vertical)
150 mm	superstructure front	47°
150 mm (100 mm)	hull front (without the additional plate)	25°
82 mm	superstructure side and rear upper hull side and rear	20° none
70 mm	hull front top	80°
62 mm	lower hull front	65°
62 mm	lower hull side lower hull rear	none 48°
28 mm	hull floor	

=== Armament ===
The main armament was the 380 mm Raketen-Werfer 61 L/5.4, a breech-loading barrel, which fired a short-range, rocket-propelled projectile roughly 1.5 m (4 ft 11 in) long. There were a variety of round types with a weight of up to 376 kg (829 lb), and a maximum range of up to 6,000 m (20,000 ft), which either contained a high explosive charge of 125 kg (276 lb) or a shaped charge for use against fortifications, which could penetrate up to 2.5 m (8 ft 2 in) of reinforced concrete. The stated range of the former was 5,650 m (6,180 yd). After a normal charge first accelerated the projectile to 45 m/s (150 ft/s), the 40 kg (88 lb) rocket charge then boosted this to about 250 m/s (820 ft/s).

The design of the rocket system caused some problems. The hot rocket exhaust could not be vented into the fighting compartment nor could the barrel withstand the pressure if the gasses were not vented. Therefore, a ring of ventilation shafts was put around the barrel which channeled the exhaust and gave the weapon something of a pepperbox appearance.

Due to the bulkiness of the ammunition, only fourteen rounds could be carried internally, of which one was already loaded, with another in the loading tray. The rest were carried in two storage racks. To help with the loading of ammunition into the vehicle, a loading crane was fitted at the rear of the superstructure next to the loading hatch. Even then, the entire five-man crew had to help with the loading.

It was intended that each Sturmtiger would be accompanied by an ammunition carrier built on the same Tiger I chassis, but only one carrier was completed.

Located at the rear of the loading hatch was a Nahverteidigungswaffe launcher which was used for close defence against infantry in addition to a frontal mounted 7.92 mm MG 34 machine gun.

This is an image of a Sturmtiger 380mm shell.

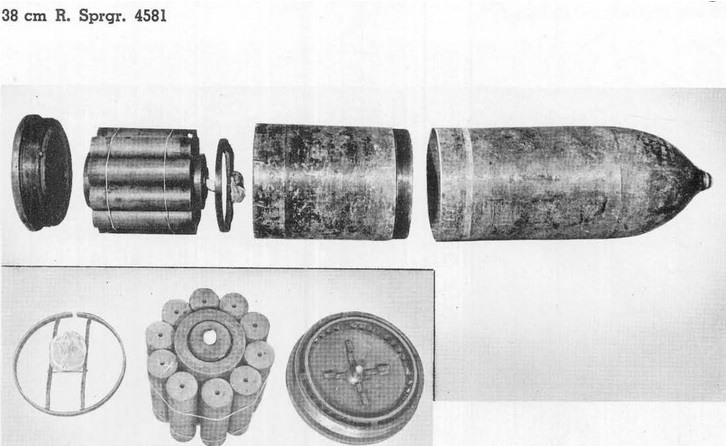
Raketensprenggranate 4581 mortar details.

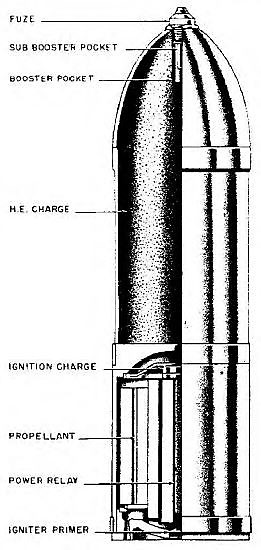
Raketensprenggranate 4581 schematic.

== Combat service ==
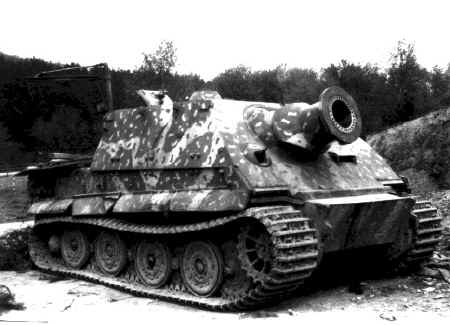
An intact Sturmtiger captured by American forces, April 1945

The Sturmtiger was intended to serve as a heavy infantry support vehicle, rendering assistance with attacks on heavily fortified or built-up areas. By the time the first Sturmtiger were available, however, Germany had lost the initiative, with the Wehrmacht being almost exclusively on the defensive rather than the offensive.

Three new Panzer companies were raised to operate the Sturmtiger: Panzer Sturmmörser Kompanien (PzStuMrKp) ("Armored Assault Mortar Company") 1000, 1001 and 1002. These originally were supposed to be equipped with fourteen vehicles, but this figure was later reduced to four each, divided into two platoons.

PzStuMrKp 1000 was raised on 13 August 1944 and fought during the Warsaw Uprising with two vehicles, as did the prototype in a separate action, which may have been the only time the Sturmtiger was used in its intended role. PzStuMrKp 1001 (commanded by Captain von Gottberg) and 1002 (commanded by Lieutenant Zippel) followed in September and October. Both PzStuMrKp 1000 and 1001 served during the Ardennes Offensive, with a total of seven Sturmtiger.

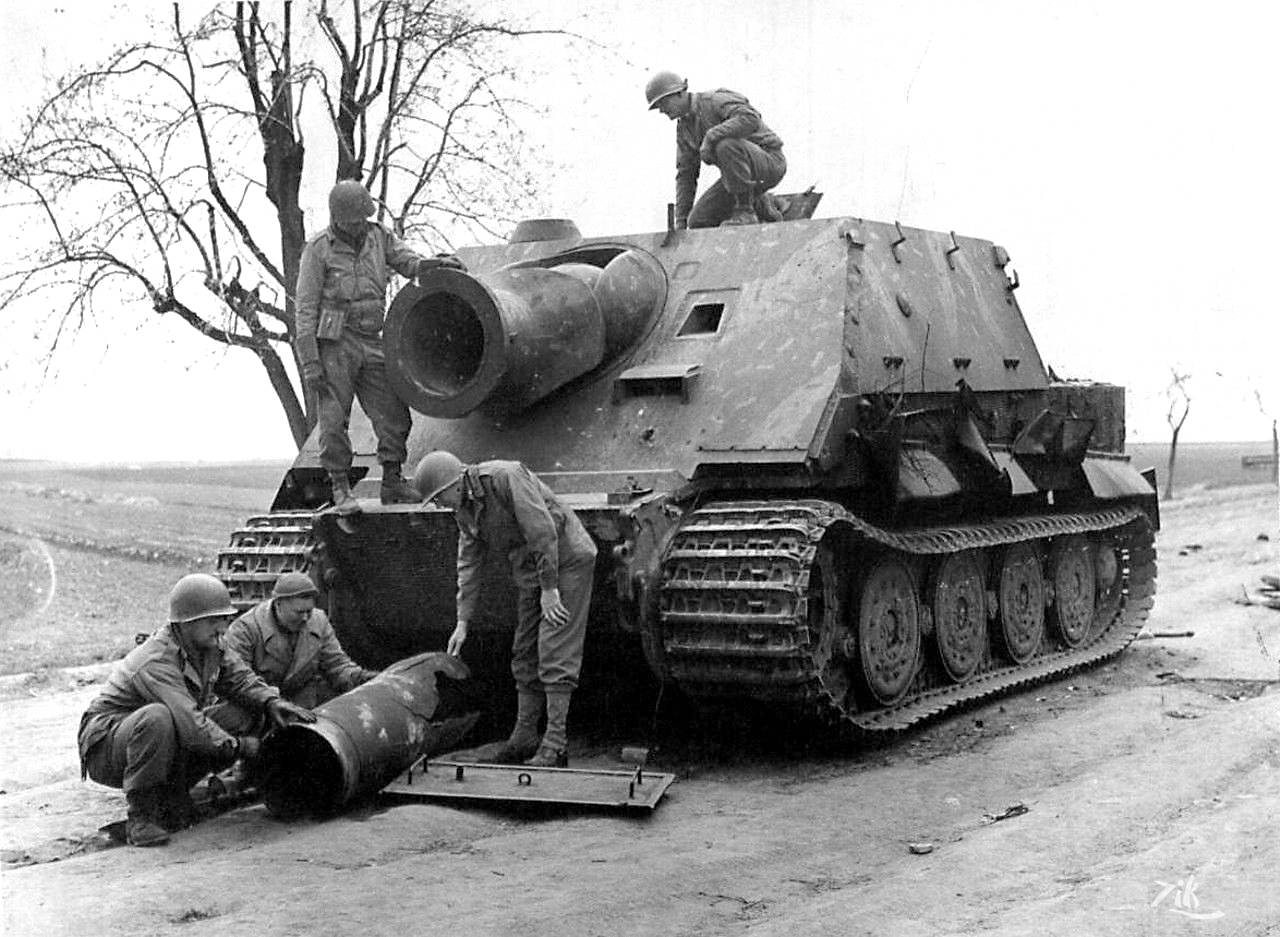
Sturmtiger, blown-up by its crew and captured by US troops, April 1945

After this offensive, the Sturmtiger were used in the defence of Germany, mainly on the Western Front.

During the battle for the bridge at Remagen, German forces mobilized Sturmmörserkompanie 1000 and 1001 (a total of 7 units) to take part in the battle. The Sturmtiger were originally tasked with using their mortars against the bridge itself, though it was discovered that they lacked the accuracy needed to hit the bridge. During this action, one of the Sturmtigers in Sturmmörserkompanie 1001 near Düren and Euskirchen allegedly hit a group of stationary Sherman tanks in a village with a 380mm round, resulting in nearly all the Shermans being put out of action, and their crews killed or wounded. This is the only tank-on-tank combat a Sturmtiger is ever recorded engaging in.

== Survivors ==
- A Sturmtiger (chassis number 250174) is on display at the Deutsches Panzermuseum at Munster. This vehicle is currently on loan from the Wehrtechnische Studiensammlung in Koblenz which acquired it from the Aberdeen Proving Ground Collection.
- A Sturmtiger (chassis number 205543) is on display at the Kubinka Tank Museum in Russia. This vehicle is believed to have been captured by advancing Red Army units in the Elbe area in April 1945.
- A 380 mm Raketen-Werfer (rocket launcher) is in the collection of The Tank Museum in England.

== See also ==
- List of WWII Maybach engines
