= Assault gun =

Class of self-propelled artillery

Assault gun
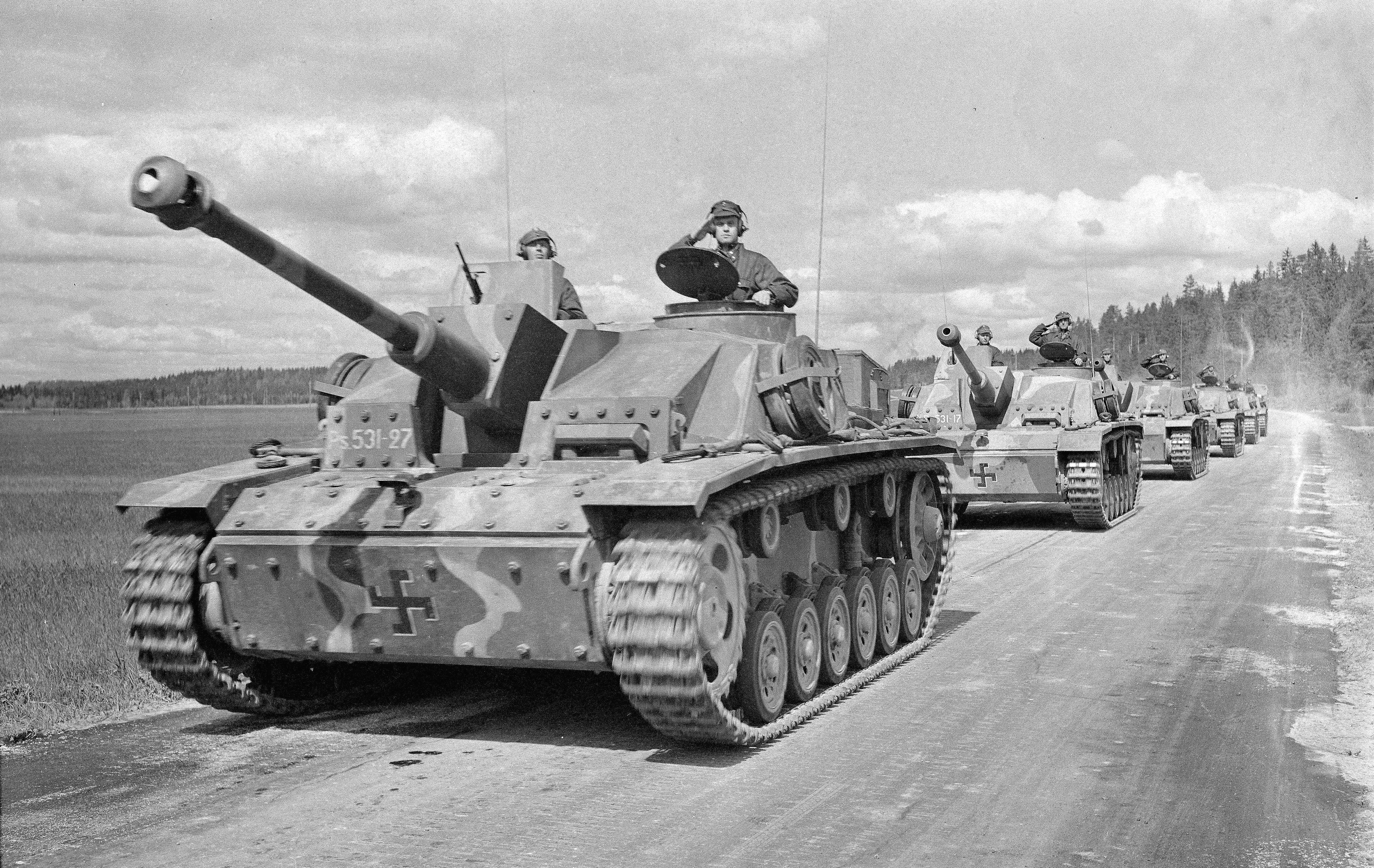
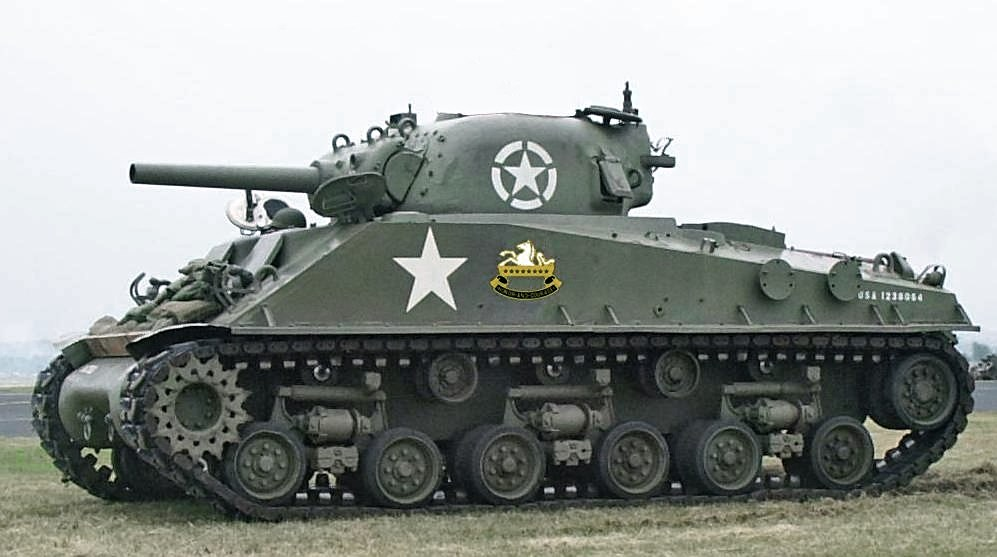
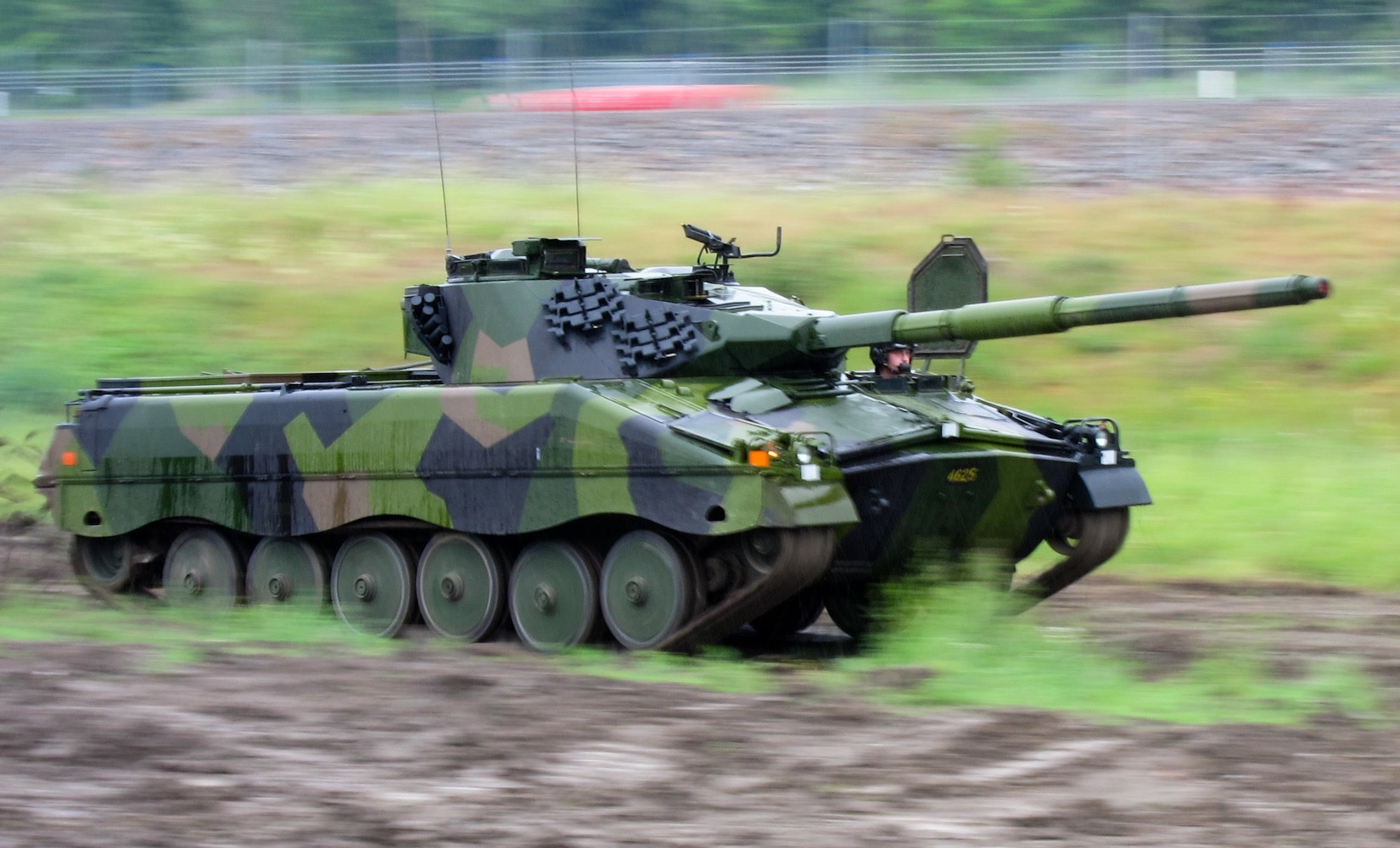
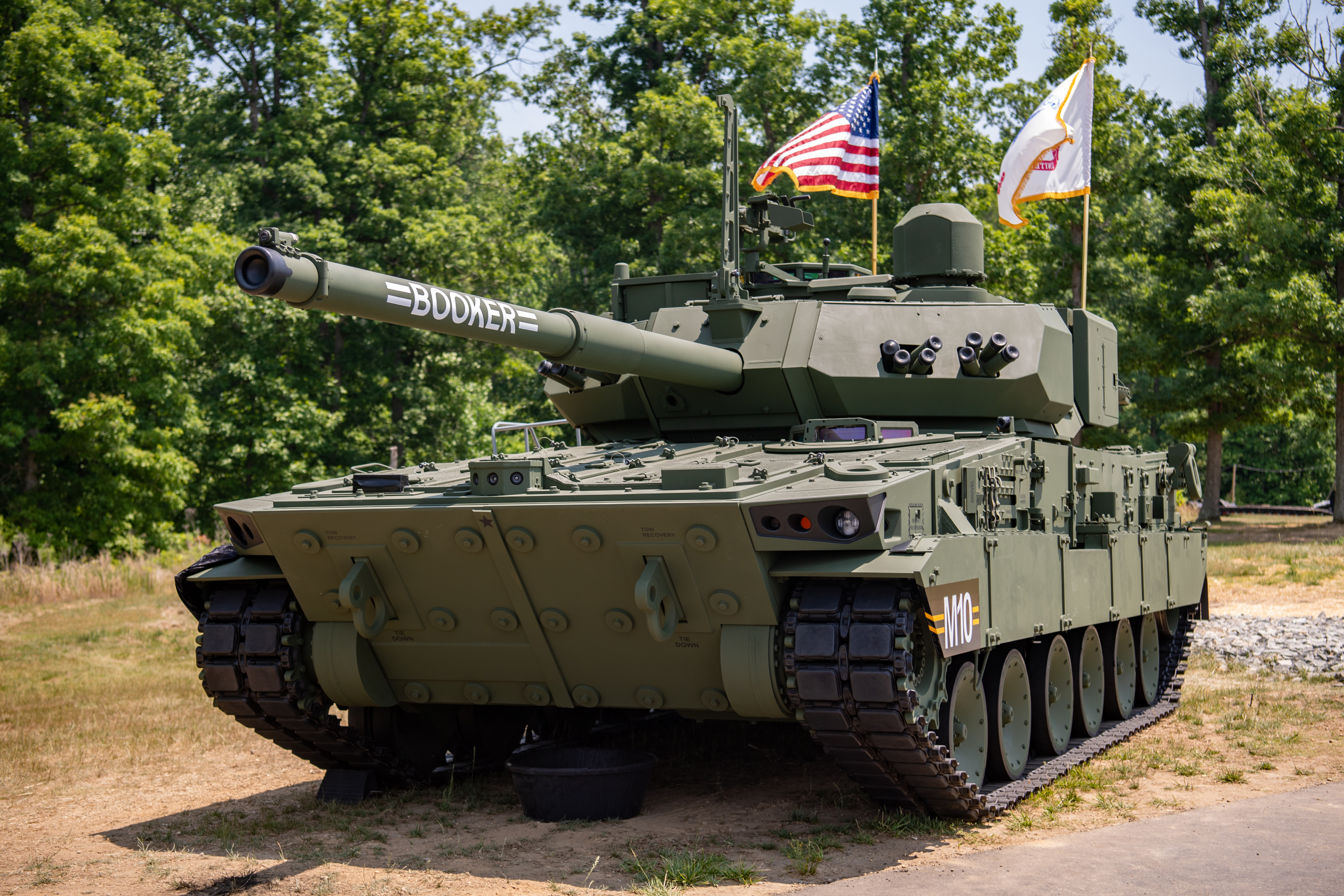
- Top left: German WWII Stug III assault guns in Finnish service.
- Top right: US WWII M4A3 (105) assault gun.
- Lower left: Swedish Cold War ikv 91 assault gun.
- Lower right: US modern M10 Booker assault gun.

An assault gun (from German: Sturmgeschütz, lit. 'storm gun', meaning "attack gun") is a type of armored infantry support vehicle and self-propelled artillery, mounting an infantry support gun on a protected self-propelled chassis, intended for providing infantry with heavy direct fire support during engagement, especially against other infantry or fortified positions, secondarily also giving some armored protection and anti-armor capability.

Assault guns were pioneered by the Soviet Union and Nazi Germany during the 1930s, initially being self-propelled guns with direct fire in mind (such as the Soviet SU-5-1), with Germany introducing the first purpose-built (and purpose-named) assault gun, the Sturmgeschütz III, in 1940.

== Concept, doctrine and design ==
The core concept of the assault gun is a protected self propelled infantry gun. This means it is intended to be used by infantry brigades in order to give infantry mobile heavy direct fire capability against protected enemy positions and threats, to be able move with infantry in assaults, and secondarily to give some armored protection against enemy fire.

Historically, the concept of assault guns was very similar to that of the infantry tank, as both were combat vehicles intended to accompany infantry formations into battle, but where assault gun designs often skipped tank features and design elements deemed unnecessary for reasons of cost and doctrine. However, during World War II assault guns were more mobile than tanks and could be utilized as both direct and indirect fire artillery. Although they could approximate the firepower of a tank, assault guns mostly fired high explosive shells at relatively low velocities, which were well suited for their role of knocking out hard points such as fortified positions and buildings. They were not intended to be deployed as tank substitutes or dedicated tank destroyers. Nevertheless, as the conflict progressed, the increasing proliferation of tanks on the battlefield forced many assault gun units to engage armor in defense of the infantry, and led to armies becoming more dependent on multipurpose designs which combined the traditionally separate roles of an assault gun and a tank destroyer.

German and Soviet assault guns introduced during World War II usually carried their main armament in a fully enclosed casemate rather than a gun turret. Although this limited the field of fire and traverse of the armament, it also had the advantage of a reduced silhouette and simplified the manufacturing process. The United States never developed a purpose-built assault gun during the war, although it did modify preexisting armored fighting vehicles for that role, including the M4 Sherman (as the M4(105)), the M5 Stuart (as the M8 Scott), and the M3 half-track (as the T19 Howitzer Motor Carriage). The classic assault gun concept was largely abandoned during the postwar era in favor of tanks or multipurpose tank destroyers attached to infantry formations, which were also capable of providing direct fire support as needed. In the United States and most Western countries, the assault gun ceased to be recognized as a unique niche, with individual examples being classified either as a self-propelled howitzer or a tank, one exception being Sweden, which continued to develop casemate assault guns post-war, such as the Infanterikanonvagn 72, all the way into the 1960s before settling on a turreted design in 1968, becoming the Infanterikanonvagn 91. The Soviet Union continued funding development of new assault guns as late as 1967, although few of its postwar designs were adopted in large numbers. In Soviet and Eastern European armies, the traditional assault gun was primarily superseded by tank destroyers, such as the SU-100, which is capable of supporting either infantry or armor. Since the 1980s, the multi-purpose assault gun concept has seen a resurgence, mainly in the form of turreted wheeled designs, such as the South African Rooikat and Italian B1 Centauro. Today, modern assault guns include the Japanese Type 16 maneuver combat vehicle and the American M1128 Stryker and M10 Booker.

== History ==
=== World War II ===
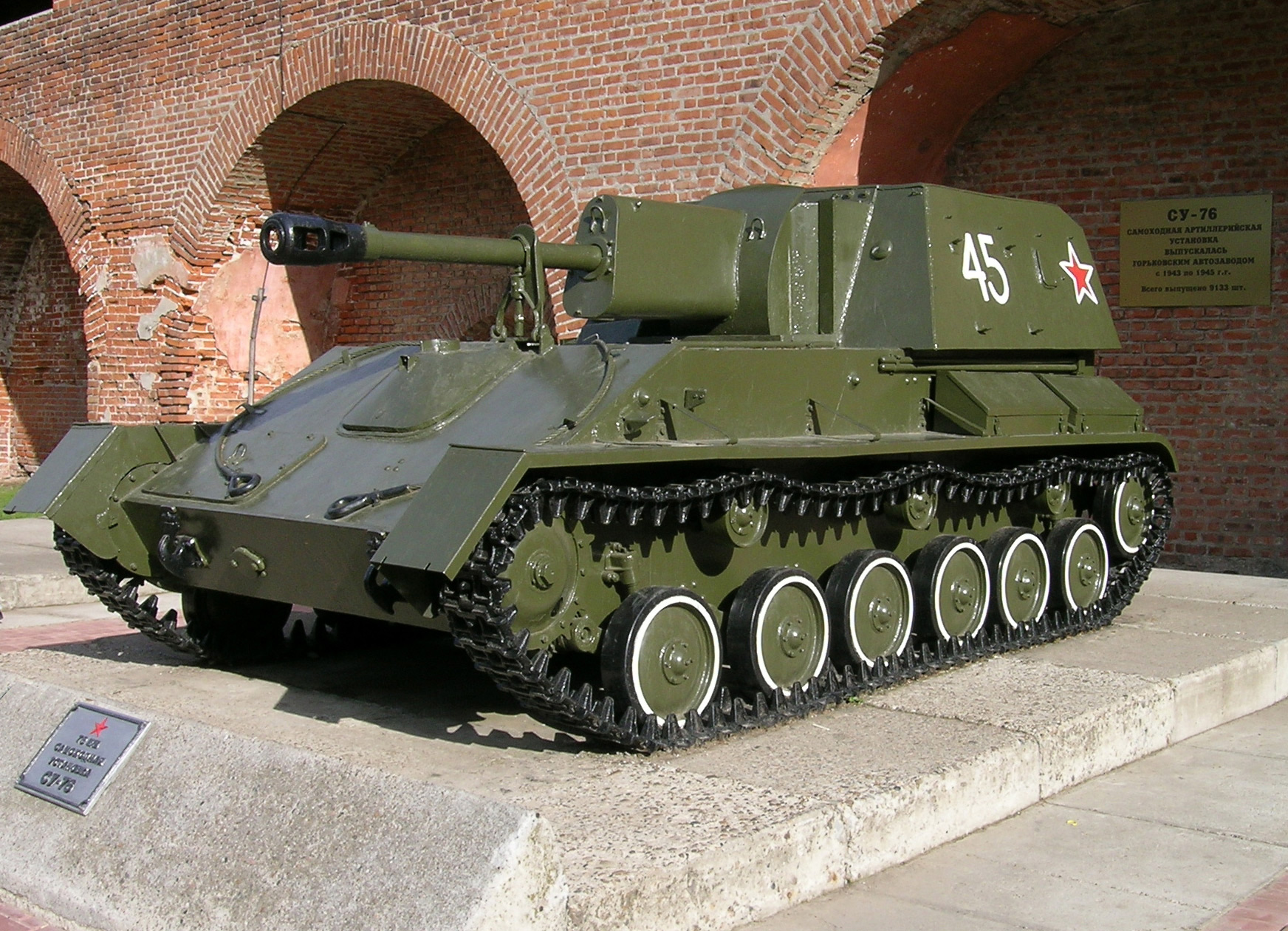
The Soviet SU-76 was easily constructed in small factories incapable of producing proper tanks.

Assault guns were primarily developed during World War II by the forces of Nazi Germany and the Soviet Union. Early in the war, the Germans began to create makeshift assault guns by mounting their infantry support weapons on the bed of a truck or on obsolete tanks with the turret removed. Later in the war, both the Germans and the Soviets introduced fully armoured purpose-built assault guns into their arsenals.

Early on, the Soviets built the KV-2, a variant of the KV-1 heavy tank with a short-barreled 152 mm howitzer mounted in an oversized turret. This was not a success in battle, and was replaced with a very successful series of turretless assault guns: the SU-76, SU-122, and the heavy SU-152, which were followed by the ISU-122 and ISU-152 on the new IS heavy tank chassis.

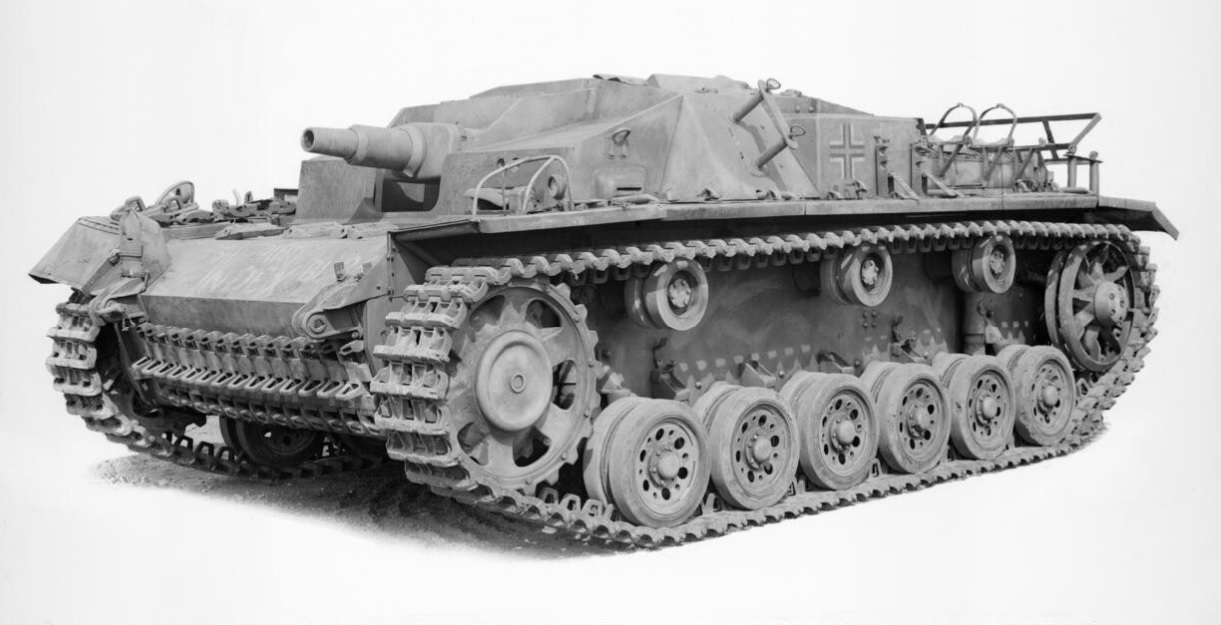
The German Stug III assault gun, here in one of its early configurations, armed with a 75 mm StuK 37 howitzer

The primary German assault gun was the Sturmgeschütz III (StuG III). At about the same time (March 1942) as the howitzer-like KwK 37 gun was dropped from the Panzer IV's use, its Sturmkanone equivalent in the StuG III up to that time, was likewise replaced with a longer-barreled, high-velocity dual-purpose 75 mm gun that had also been derived from the successful PaK 40 anti-tank towed artillery piece. The Germans also built a number of other fully armoured turretless assault guns, including the StuG IV, StuIG 33B, Brummbär and Sturmtiger. This last one was a very heavy vehicle, and was built only in small quantities.

Battalions of assault guns, usually StuG IIIs, commonly replaced the intended panzer battalion in the German panzergrenadier divisions due to the chronic shortage of tanks, and were sometimes used as makeshifts even in the panzer divisions. Independent battalions were also deployed as "stiffeners" for infantry divisions, and the StuG III's anti-tank capabilities bolstered dwindling tank numbers on the Eastern and Western fronts.

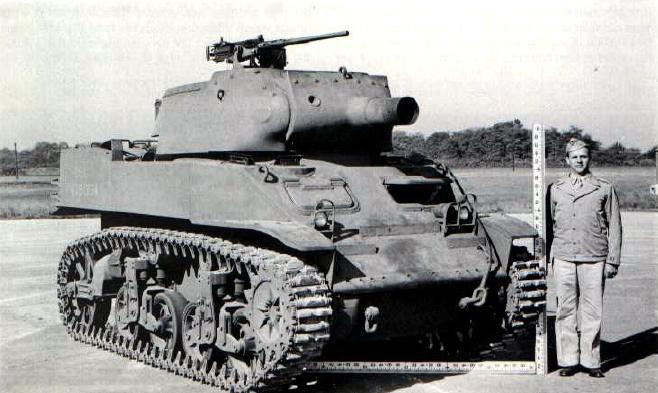
US World War II assault gun M8 Scott

US and UK forces also deployed vehicles designed for a close support role, but these were conventional tanks whose only significant modification was the replacement of the main gun with a howitzer. Two versions of the American Sherman tank were armed with the M4 105 mm howitzer, the M4(105) and the M4A3(105); these were designated assault guns in US usage of the term. The M8 Scott, based on the chassis of the M5 Stuart light tank, was also an assault cannon and carried a 75 mm short howitzer. The Churchill, Centaur and Cromwell tanks were all produced in versions armed with 95 mm howitzers: the Churchill Mark V and Mark VIII, the Centaur Mark IV and the Cromwell Mark VI. Earlier British tanks, such as the Crusader cruiser tank and the Matilda II Infantry tank were produced in versions armed with the 3-inch howitzer; the first versions of the Churchill tank also had this gun in a hull mounting. American tank destroyer units were often used in the assault gun role for infantry support.

The AVRE version of the Churchill tank was armed with a spigot mortar that fired a 40 lb (18 kg) HE-filled projectile (nicknamed the Flying Dustbin) 150 yards (140 m). Its task was to attack fortified positions such as bunkers at close range (see Hobart's Funnies).

=== Since World War II ===
In the post-World War II era, most vehicles fitting into an "assault gun" category were developed as a light-weight, air-deployable, direct fire combat vehicles for use with airborne troops. Those weapons were either based on light utility vehicles or small tracked vehicles and the airborne troops thus always fought at a distinct disadvantage in terms of heavy weapons. The Soviet Union and the United States were the most attracted to the idea of providing this capability to traditionally light airborne forces. Their answers to the problem were similar, with the United States developing the M56 Scorpion and the Soviet Union developing the ASU-57, both essentially airdroppable light anti-tank guns.

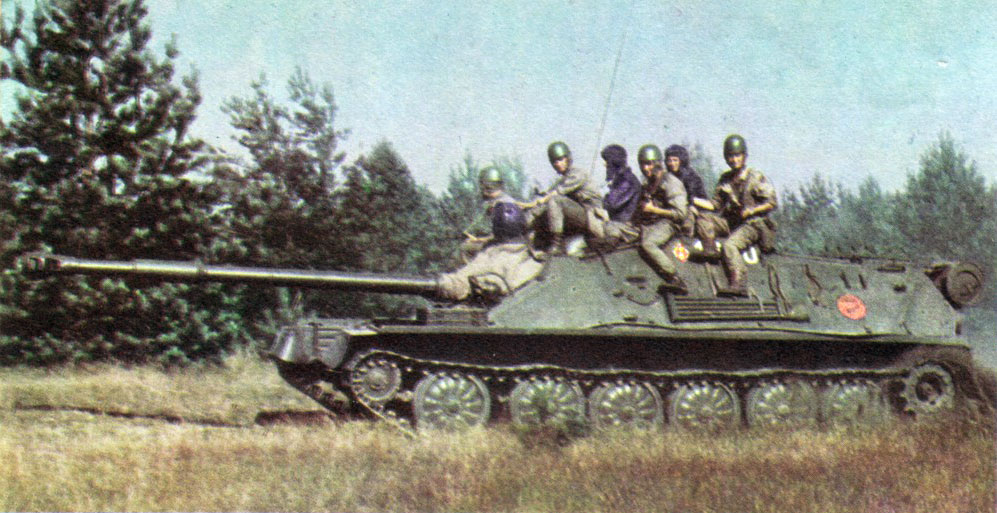
Soviet ASU-85 air-deployable assault gun

The Soviets went on to develop an improved airdroppable assault gun, the ASU-85, which served through the 1980s, while their SU-100 remained in service with Communist countries, including Vietnam and Cuba, years after World War II. The US M56 and another armoured vehicle, the M50 Ontos, were to be the last of the more traditional assault guns in US service. Improvised arrangements such as M113 personnel carriers with recoilless rifles were quickly replaced by missile carrier vehicles in the anti-tank role.

The only vehicle with the qualities of an assault gun to be fielded after the removal of the M50 and M56 from service within the US military was the M551 Sheridan. The Sheridan's gun was a low-velocity weapon suitable in the assault role, but with the addition of the Shillelagh missile could double in the anti-tank role as well. The Sheridan, however, was not developed as an assault gun but as a light reconnaissance vehicle.

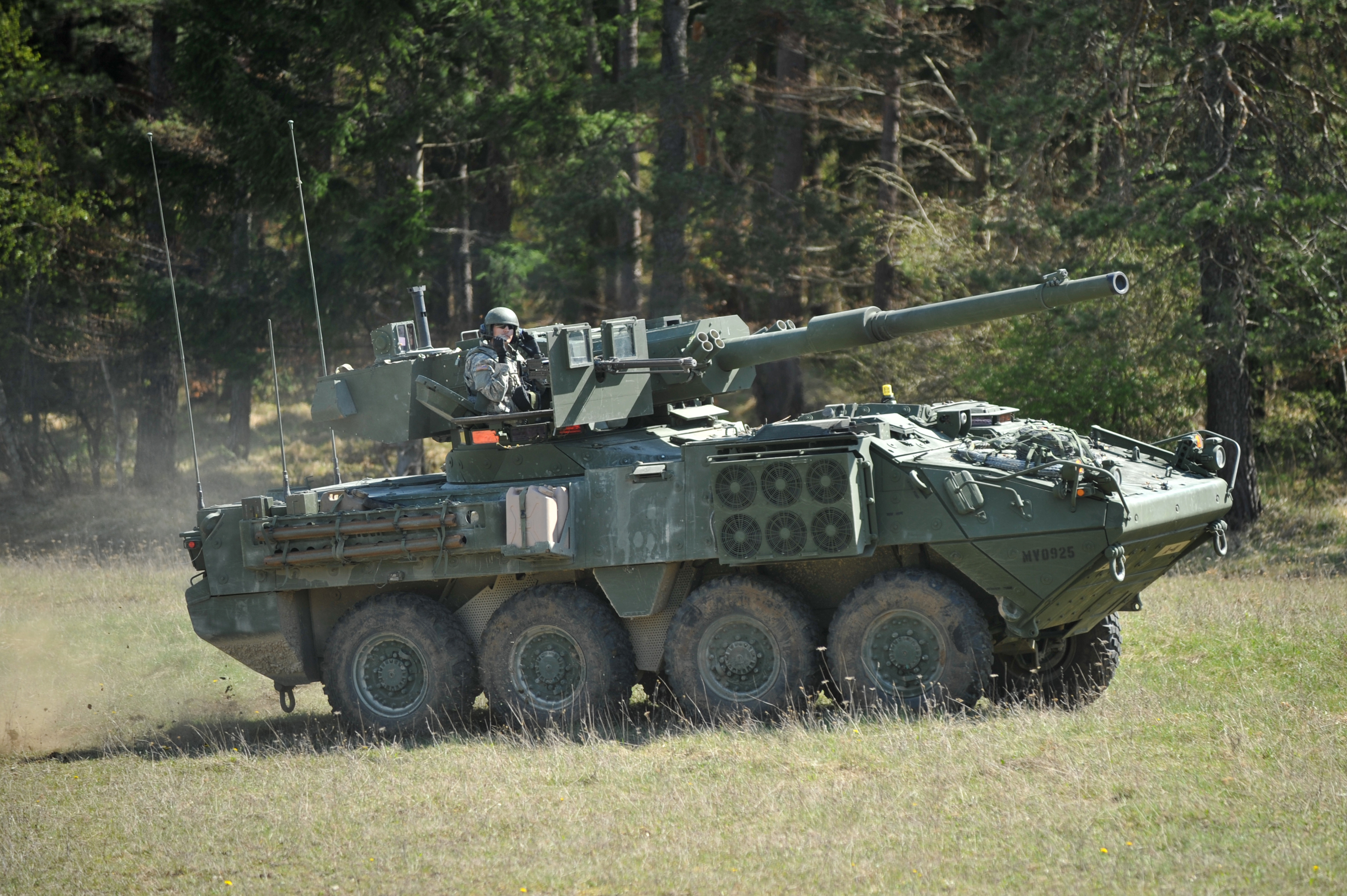
US M1128 mobile gun system assault gun

Currently, there appears to be a move toward wheeled vehicles fitting a "tank destroyer" or "assault gun" role, such as the M1128 mobile gun system of the United States Army, the B1 Centauro wheeled tank destroyer of the Italian and Spanish Armies, the Chinese anti-tank gun PTL-02 and ZBL08 assault gun, and the French AMX-10 RC heavy armoured car. While these vehicles might be useful in a direct fire role, none were developed with this specifically in mind, reminiscent of the use of tank destroyers by the US military in the assault gun role during World War II.

== Assault guns per nation ==
=== Germany ===
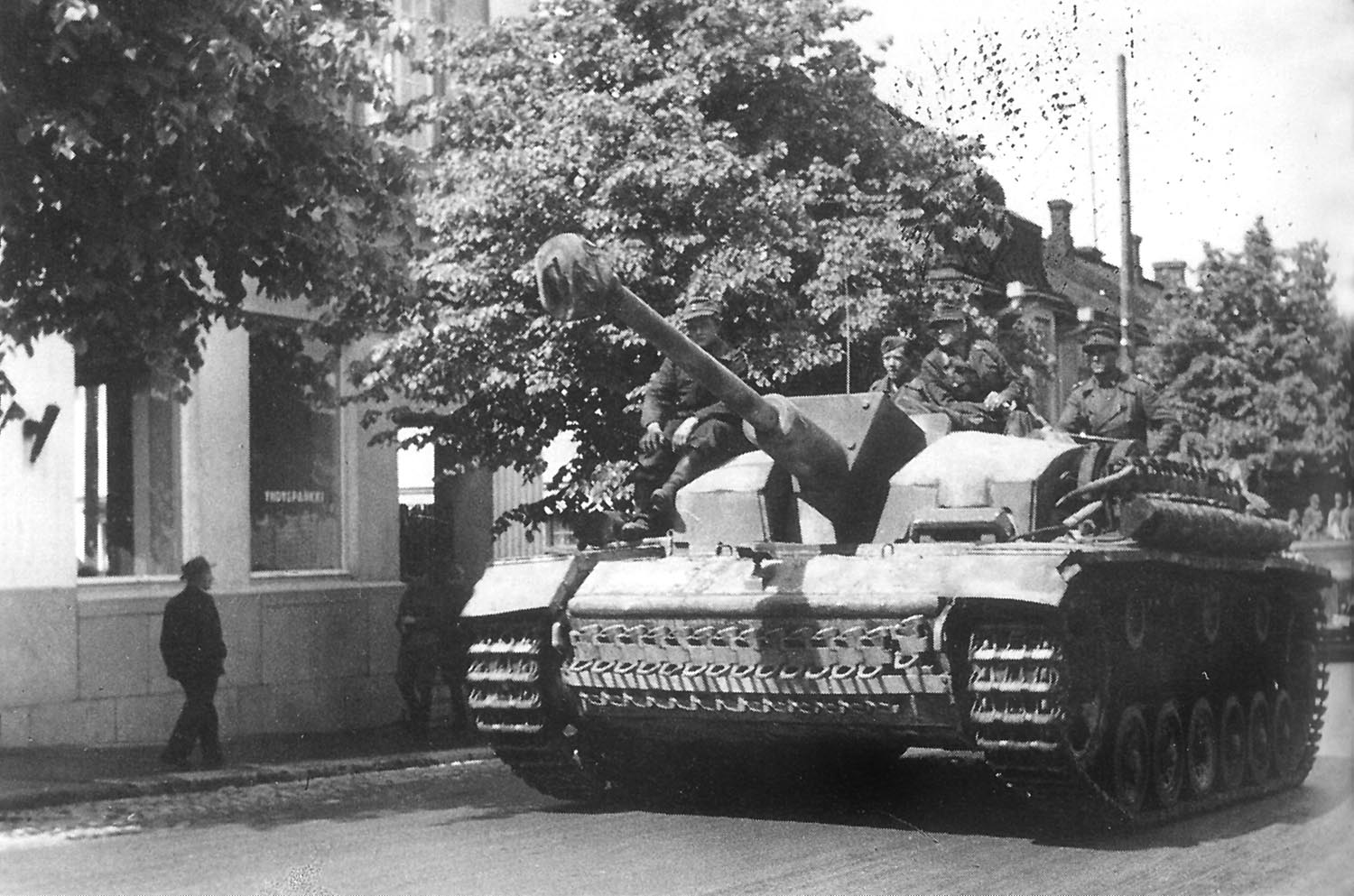
German Sturmgeschütz III

- 1940 – Sturmgeschütz III
- 1940 – Sturmpanzer I Bison
- 1941 – Sturmpanzer II
- 1942 – Sturmpanzer III
- 1942 – Sturm-Infanteriegeschütz 33B
- 1943 – Sturmhaubitze 42
- 1943 – Sturmgeschütz IV
- 1943 – Sturmpanzer IV Stupa
- 1943 – Sturmpanzer 38(t) Grille Ausf. H
- 1944 – Sturmpanzer 38(t) Grille Ausf. K
- 1944 – Sturmpanzer VI Sturmtiger

=== Hungary ===
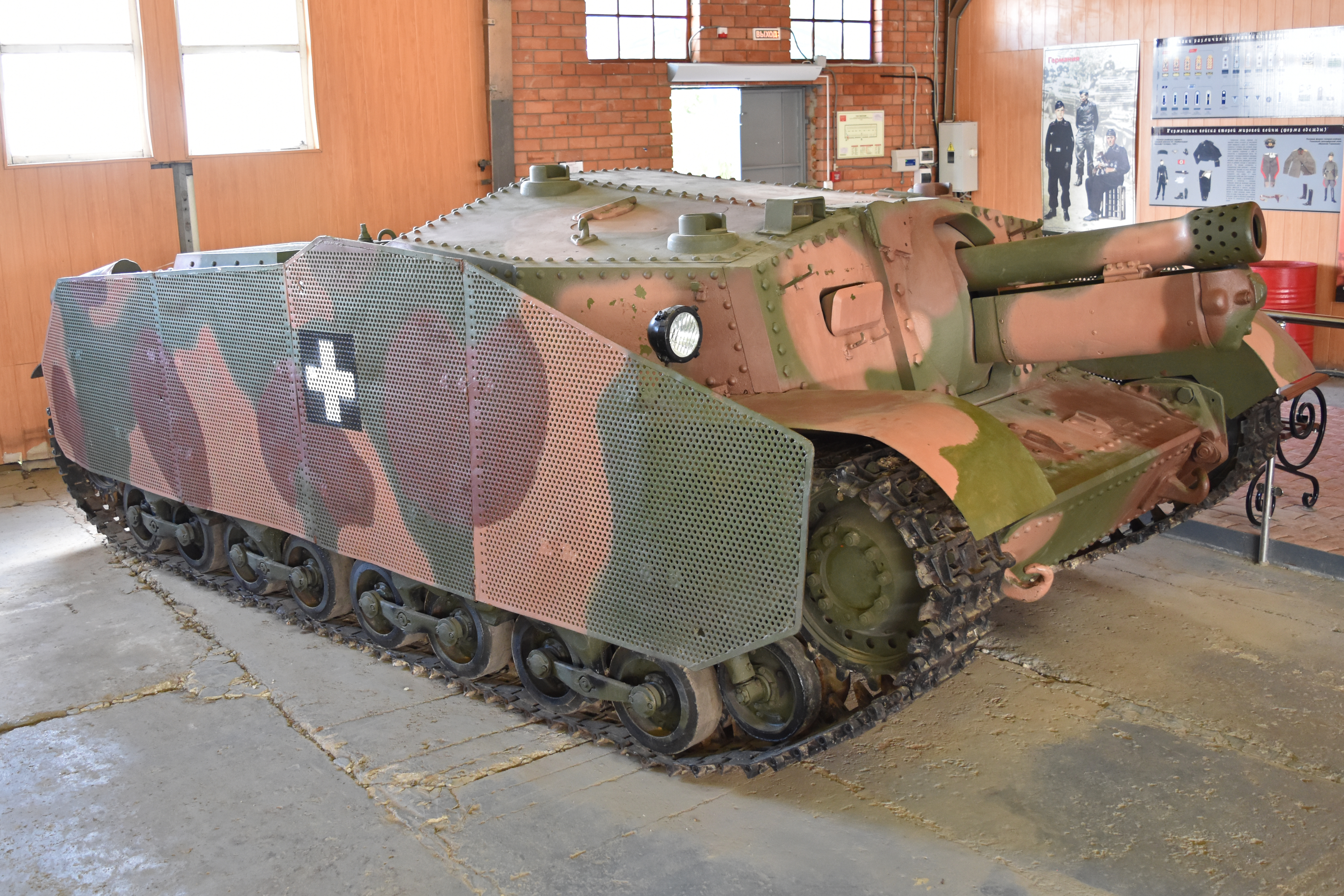
Hungarian 43M Zrínyi II

- 1943 – 43M Zrínyi II
- 1944 – 44M Zrínyi I

=== Soviet Union / Russia ===
- 1931 – SU-5
- 1934 – SU-5-1
- 1934 – SU-5-2
- 1934 – SU-5-3
- 1935 – SU-6
- 1935 – AT-1
- 1940 – KV-2
- 1941 – SU-26
- 1942 – SU-122
- 1942 – SU-76
- 1943 – SU-85
- 1943 – SU-152
- 1943 – ISU-152
- 1944 – ISU-122
- 1944 – KSP-76
- 1944 – SU-100
- 1951 – ASU-57
- 1959 – ASU-85
- 1969 – BMD-1
- 2001 – 2S25
- 2004 – BMD-4

=== Sweden ===
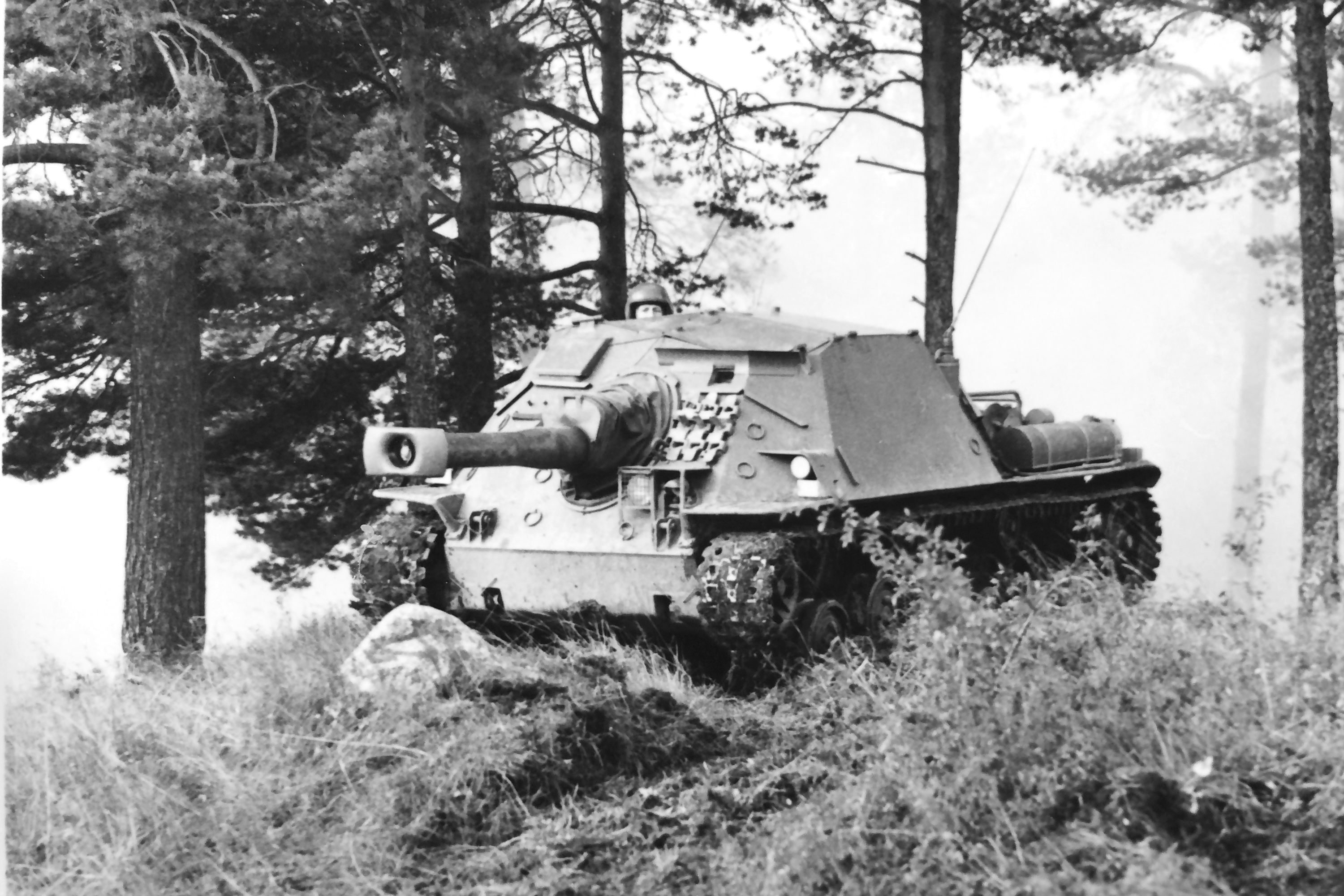
Swedish Infanterikanonvagn 103

- 1943 – Stormpjäs fm/43
- 1944 – Stormpjäs fm/43-44
- 1944 – Stormartillerivagn m/43
- 1953 – Infanterikanonvagn 72
- 1957 – Infanterikanonvagn 73
- 1957 – Infanterikanonvagn 102
- 1957 – Infanterikanonvagn 103
- 1976 – Infanterikanonvagn 91
- 1994 – Stridsfordon 90105
- 1998 – Stridsfordon 90120

=== U.S. ===
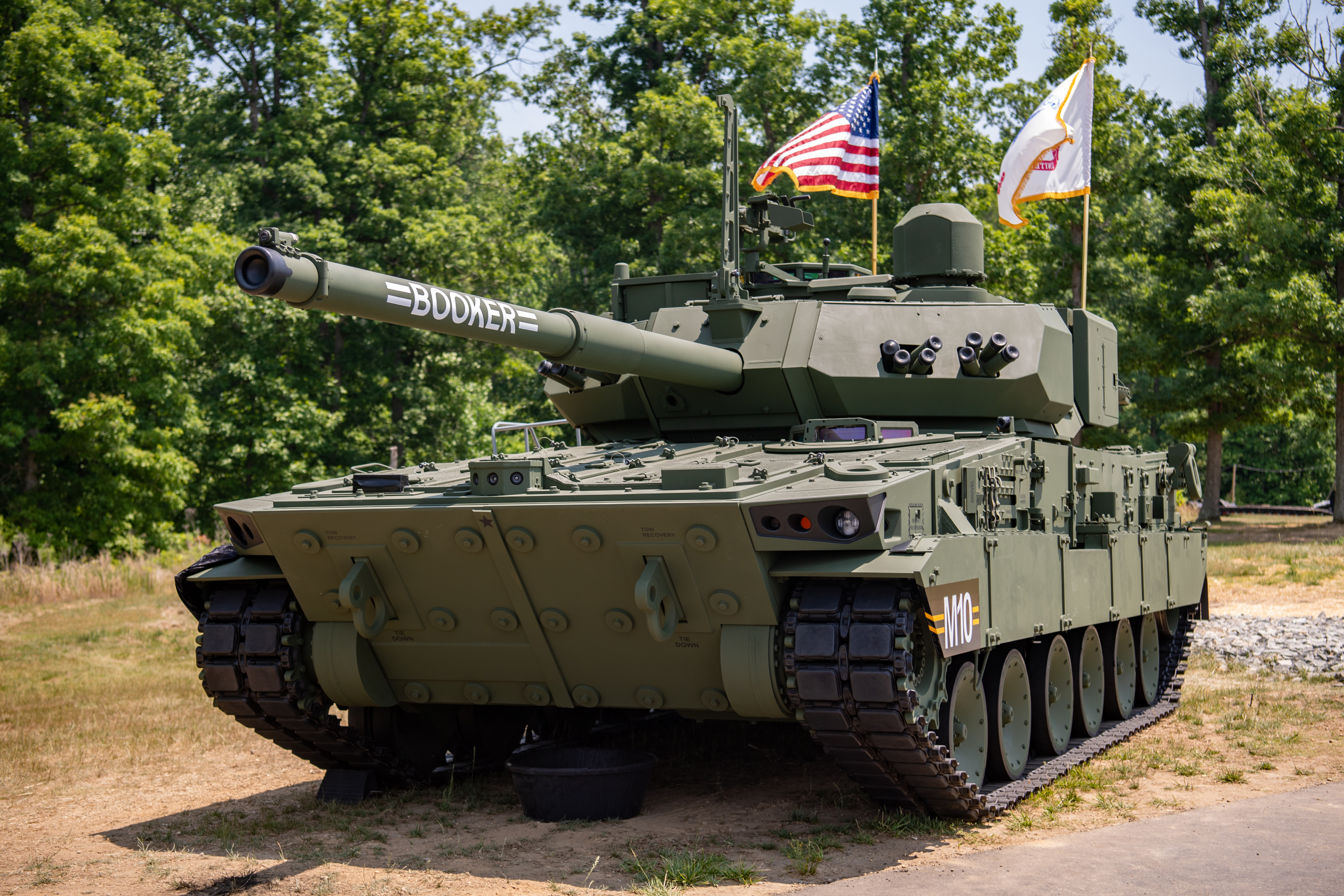
US M10 Booker

- 1941 – M3 GMC
- 1941 – T18 HMC
- 1942 – T19 HMC
- 1942 – M8 Scott
- 1944 – M4 Sherman 105
- 1953 – M56 Scorpion
- 1956 – M50 Ontos
- 1969 – M551 Sheridan
- 1985 – CCVL
- 1992 – M8 AGS
- 2002 – M1128 Stryker (LAV-105)
- 2021 – XM1302 MPF (Note: By extension of the M8 AGS program and the following MPF program.)
- 2022 – M10 Booker

== See also ==
- Jagdpanzer
- Panzerjäger
- Sturmgeschütz
- List of infantry support guns
