= Alkett =

Major manufacturer of armored vehicles during World War II

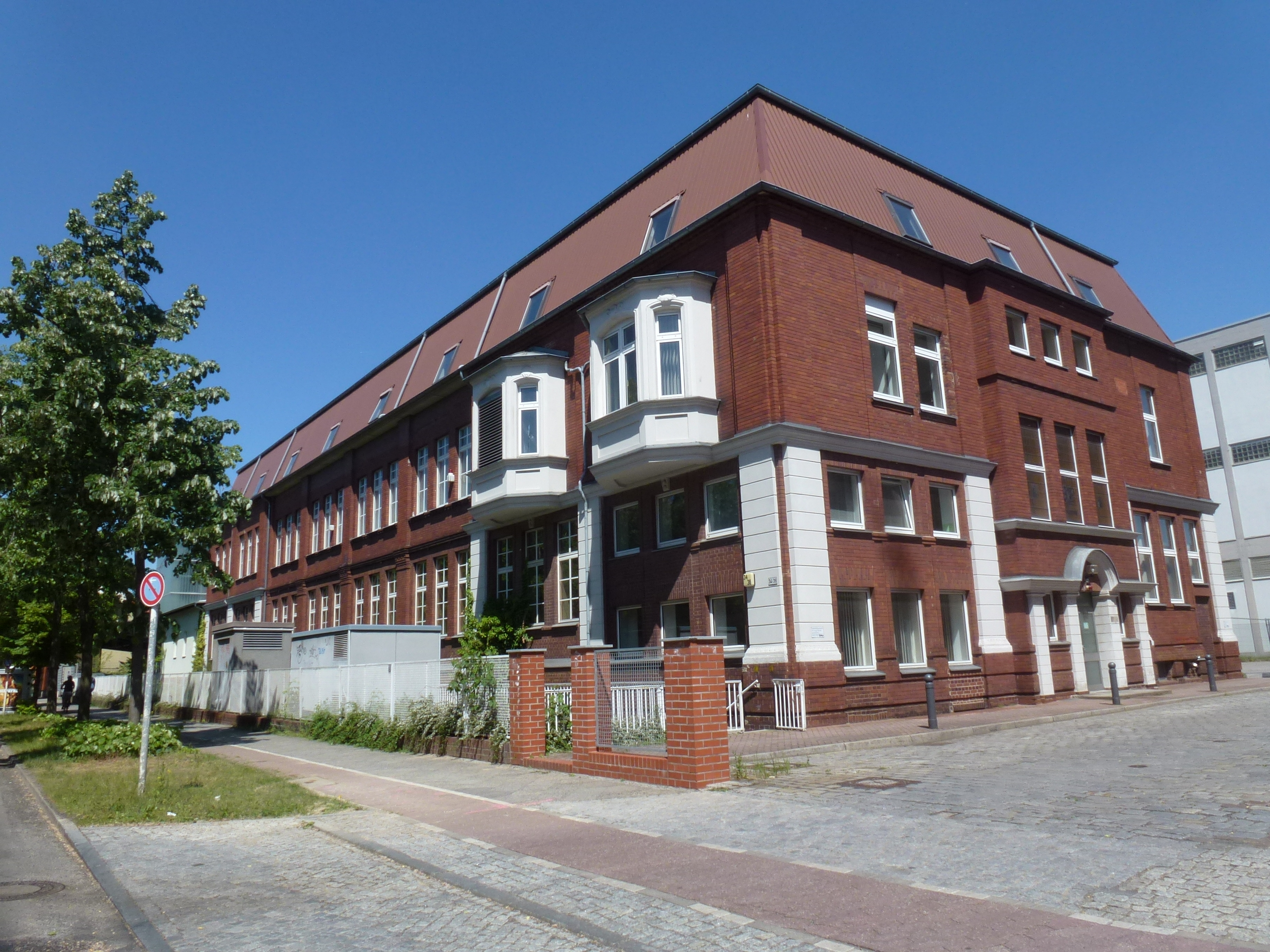
Former main entrance of the Alkett Administration building on Breitenbachstraße in Berlin

Alkett (German: Altmärkische Kettenwerk GmbH, lit. 'Altmark track works') was a major manufacturer of armored vehicles for the Wehrmacht during World War II. The main factory was located in Berlin-Borsigwalde on the Breitenbachstraße. As more sites were added, the name changed to Altmärkische Kettenwerke.

== Founded ==
Alkett was founded in 1937 as a subsidiary of Rheinmetall-Borsig AG, which in turn was a subsidiary of the government-controlled Reichswerke Hermann Göring. The main facility was sited on the Rota-wagon and Maschinenbau GmbH plants, which had not been in use since 1928.

== Production plants ==
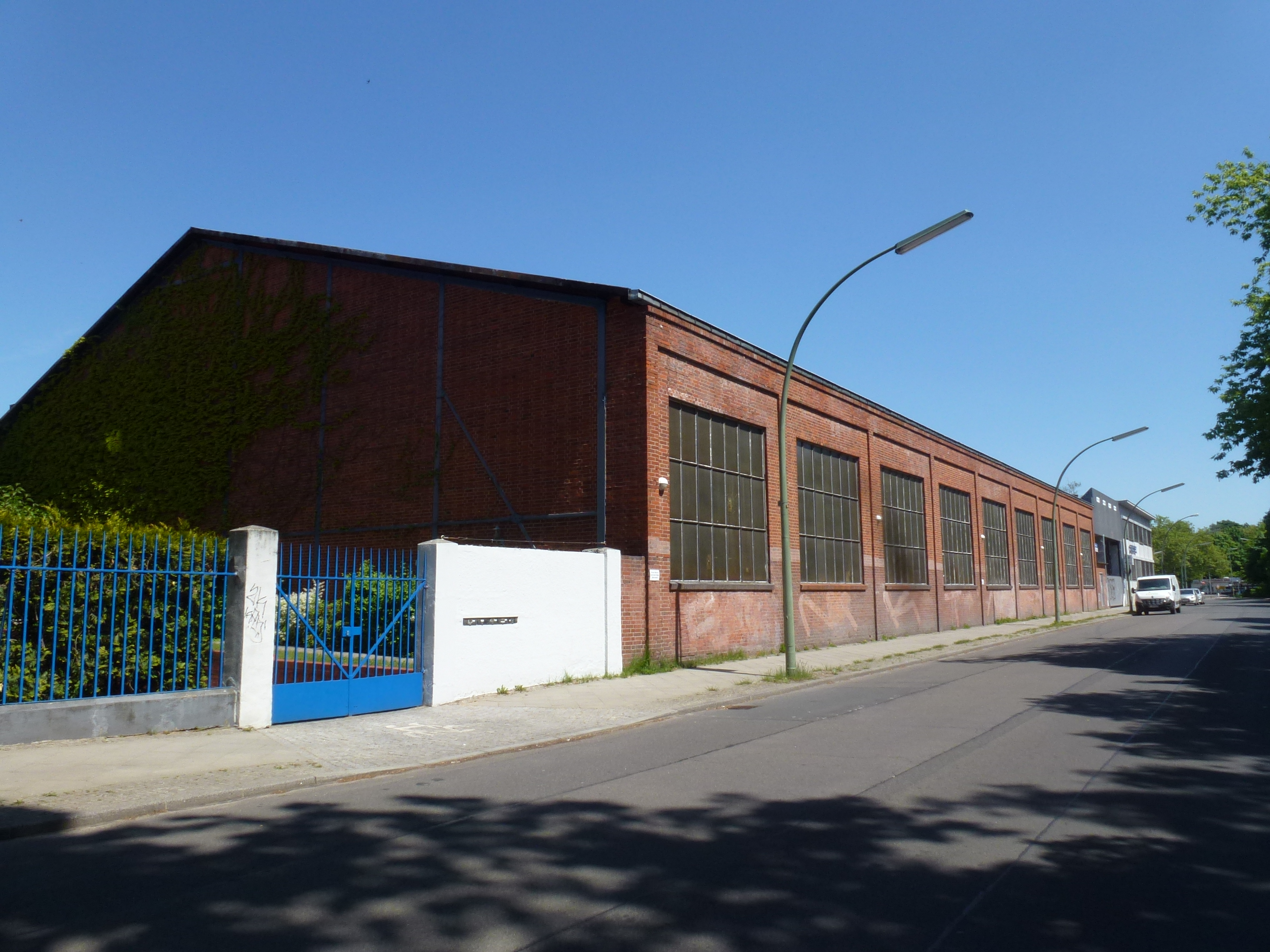
Alkett workshops on Breitenbachstraße

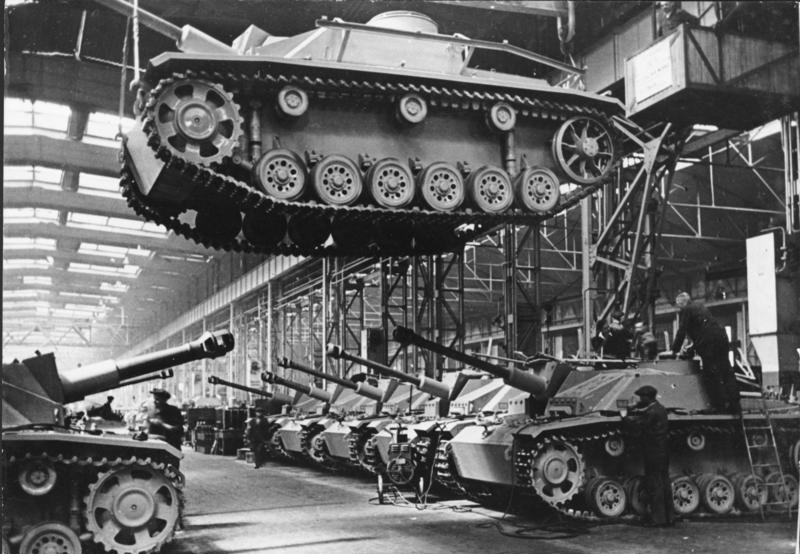
Production of the Sturmgeschütz III and Sturmhaubitze 42 at Alkett

=== Factory I ===
The site at Breitenbachstraße 33-36, the later Plant I, had to be extensively rebuilt. The administrative headquarters were located to the left of the main entrance. The basement housed a canteen for the employees. To the right of the main entrance a fire department was located, along with the workshop, and an electrical substation for supplying the electric power distribution of 6,000 to 30,000 volts. Behind the administration building were Production Halls 1 through 8.

With the coming of the Second World War increased demand for armored fighting vehicles resulted in a marked ramp-up of production. Alkett obtained a site for manufacturing directly across the street from their main buildings. Located on Breitenbachstraße 1-6, the former site of the Löwenberg factory, was built Production Halls 9-12. The test area for foreign tank design was located in Hall 12. Here the engineers tested the T-34 and Sherman tanks to draw conclusions for their own production. Other facilities were located at Breitenbachstraße 72.

The factory on Breitenbachstraße was fully sealed and secured from the passage of outside traffic to prevent espionage. Once the war began additional workshops were rented in the vicinity of the Hartung Jachmann AG and a technical department was set up. In addition, access of the yard area to the basement bomb shelter was expanded to allow for use by the civilian population. By 1942, the administration grew so large that between 74 and 86 additional office barracks had to be added on Holzhauser Street. All of these elements were under the name of Factory I.

=== Factory II ===
Factory II, also called the "Maschinen und Gerätebau Tegel" (Machinery and Equipment Works) (Maget), was originally located in Tegel near the Borsig plant in Eisenhammerweg.

=== Factory III ===
Factory III (former Altmärkische Kettenwerke, Werk III) was in Berlin-Spandau located on Freiheit 16–17 street.

== Production ==
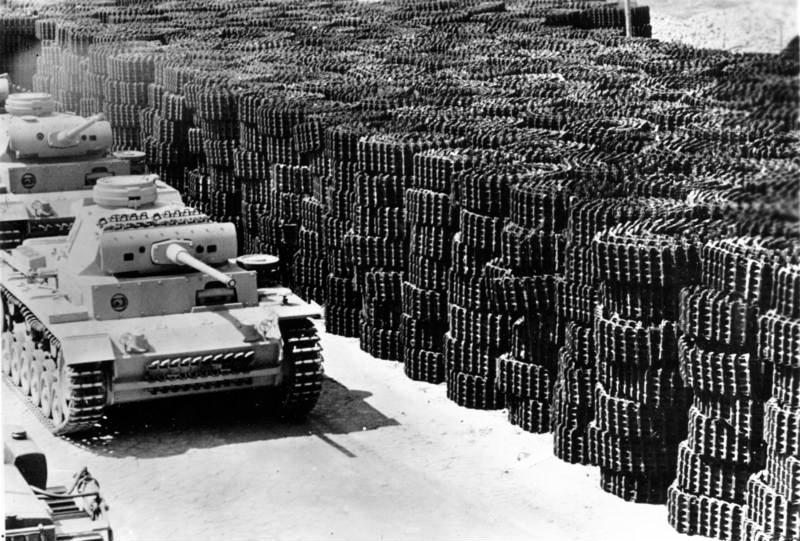
Panzer III production

Altmärkischen Kettenwerke performed as designer, manufacturer, and partially exclusive licensee of some of the main armored fighting vehicles of the Wehrmacht. The company was involved in the development, production and modification of the following vehicles:

- Panzerkampfwagen II
- Panzerkampfwagen III Ausf. F, G, H, J, L
- Panzerkampfwagen VIII Maus
- Flakpanzer I

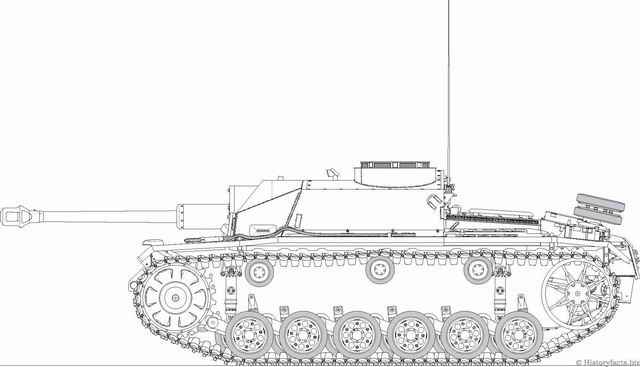
StuG III, Ausf. G, September 1944

- Sturmgeschütz III Ausf. C, D, E, F, G (the Wehrmacht's most-produced armored fighting vehicle design)
- Sturmhaubitze 42
- Sturm-Infanteriegeschütz 33B
- Sturmpanzer VI
- Nashorn
- Panzerjäger Renault R 35(f) (modified the structure and armament, did not perform the original production of the vehicle)
- Jagdpanzer IV/70(A) (development only, no production)
- Sturmpanzer IV (development only, no production)
- Hummel (development only, no production)
- Wespe (development only, no production)

The completed tanks were test driven on Holzhauser Street. Since 10 to 20 new tanks left the factory every day, their appearance was a common feature of the townscape at the time. Alkett also repaired damaged tanks that were brought by rail from the front to the plant site.

Alkett is the company that Major Alfred Becker worked with, initially in early 1942 to help create self-propelled artillery pieces by use of captured French Lorraine Schlepper ammunition carriers. Becker converted these vehicles to carry the 150 mm sFH 18. Becker's later work converting captured French vehicles to carry German weapons was assisted by Alkett, which produced the steel superstructures for the vehicles Becker was modifying in France.

Allied air attacks on November 23 and 26, 1943 resulted in the upper floors of the administration building collapsing. The office in the barracks Holzhauser Straße 74-86 burned down completely. Following this raid, plant management shifted part of production to the newly completed halls at Falkirk-Albrechtshof.

The November bombing raid had a significant impact on the production of the StuG III. (Note: Though originally conceived as an infantry support weapon, the Sturmgeschütz series of assault guns proved very successful, particularly after the vehicle was given a high-velocity 75 mm StuK 40 L/43 main gun. The StuG IIIs collectively destroyed more tanks than any other vehicle in the German inventory. Because of their low silhouette, StuG IIIs were easy to camouflage and difficult to target. They were also relatively inexpensive to produce. The StuG III was Alkett's most successful design.) This was an important weapon for the army and Alkett was the major manufacturer. Alkett had produced 255 StuG IIIs in October 1943, but in December the number fell to just 24 vehicles. A conference to discuss alternatives with Adolf Hitler was held on December 6–7, 1943. It was noted that if production could be shifted to another manufacturer German assault tank production could be sustained. The suggestion was offered of using the Fried. Krupp Grusonwerk AG Magdeburg for assault gun production by taking the StuG III superstructure and mounting it onto the Panzer IV chassis. To make up for the large deficit in this valuable Alkett weapon, the StuG IV received full support and its production at Krupp-Gruson was initiated.

Since primary military production was not related to the repair work, it was not essential to relocate the railroad network. By June 1944 Alkett had fully recuperated through setting up a new plant in Falkensee.

On October 6, 1944, a third major air raid struck the plant, resulting in the destruction of 80 percent of Warehouses 1 through 5.

== Employees ==
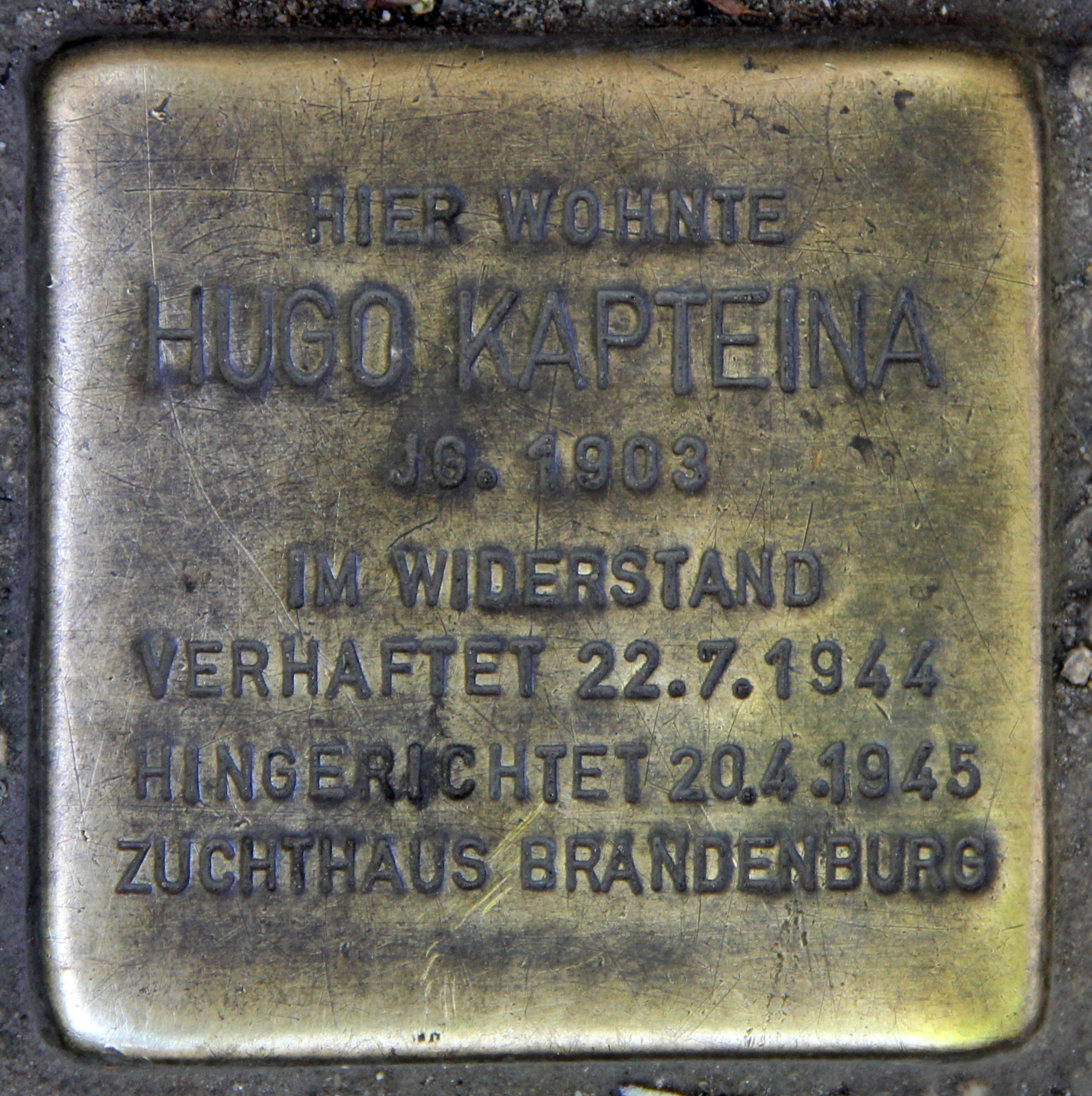

Between 3,000 and 4,000 employees worked at the Alkett plants. From 1941 foreign civilian workers from Italy and Belgium were added who had "volunteered" to work in Germany. They were housed in non-guarded barracks on Holzhauser Street 42-50. The plants also made use of forced laborers. These included Poles and Russian, Yugoslav and Italian prisoners of war. These workers were housed on Dietrich Eckhardt Street, which is now called Gorky Street.

In 1943 designer Hugo Kapteina formed a resistance group within the factory. Leaflets were produced, distributed and acts of sabotage were carried out. One technique Kapteina called upon was for welders to use excessive current so that the welds would not hold for long. Kapteina was found out and arrested in 1944. He was executed on April 20, 1945. On the same day senior master Franz Hahne was awarded the Golden Knight's Cross to the War Merit Cross with swords. This was only twice awarded.

On April 23, 1945 Soviet troops occupied the Alkett plants.

== After the war ==
In the first months after the end of the war the factory was dismantled by order of the Soviet Military Administration. Since Alkett resided in the French sector of Berlin, as stipulated by the Yalta conference, the Soviets were unable to take everything away. With the portion of the plant that had not been dismantled, the remaining machinery was used for production of much needed everyday items, such as pots, pans and buckets. In early 1948 Alkett resumed work in mechanical engineering, and began receiving ore supplies. In 1953 work halls 1-6 located at 10-12 Breitenbachstraße were renamed Alkett GmbH. Work with the welding presses was resumed to produce gears, gear boxes, and stainless steel screws.

In the late 1950s the company was re-renamed Alkett Maschinenbau GmbH. In 1966 the Bundesschatzministerium (Federal Ministry for the Treasury), which held 90% of the ownership, requested Alkett be incorporated along with other West Berlin companies such as Borsig, Schwartzkopff, Typography (Linotype machine) and Fritz Werner machine tools into the DIAG (Deutsche Industrieanlagen GmbH), a group that later became part of MAN Ferrostaal Industrieanlagen GmbH.
