= Infanterikanonvagn 91 =

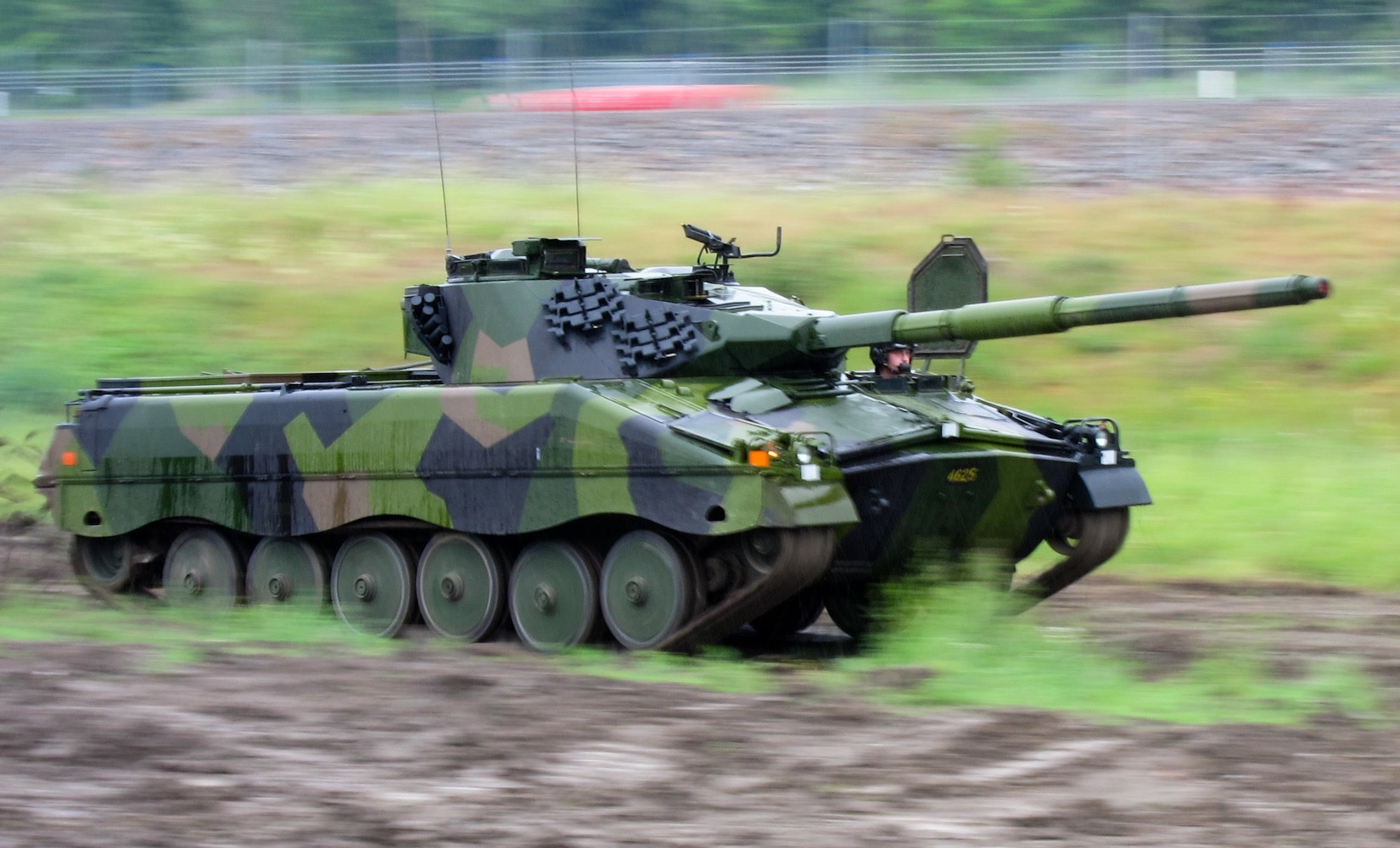
- Infanterikanonvagn 91 (ikv 91)
- Type: Amphibious turreted assault gun for mobile anti-tank, fire support tasks
- Place of origin: Sweden

Production history
- No. built: 212

Specifications
- Mass: 16,300 kg (35,900 lb)
- Length: 6.41 m (21 ft 0 in); 8.85 m (29 ft 0 in) including gun
- Width: 3.00 m (9 ft 10 in)
- Height: 2.32 m (7 ft 7 in)
- Crew: 4
- Armor: Protection against 20 mm artillery
- Main armament: 1 × 90 mm KV90S73 (unstabilized) with laser rangefinder and hunter-killer capability
- Secondary armament: 2 × 7.62 mm ksp m/39 machine guns 2 × 71 mm Lyran flare mortars
- Engine: Diesel Volvo Penta model TD 120 A, turbocharged straight six-cylinder; cylinder volume 11.97 litres 330 hp (250 kW) at 2,200 rpm
- Power/weight: 20.2 hp/tonne
- Transmission: Allison 4 step automatic
- Suspension: Torsion beam suspension
- Operational range: 500 km (310 mi)
- Maximum speed: 65 km/h (40 mph)

The infanterikanonvagn 91 (ikv 91; lit. 'infantry cannon wagon 91') is a high mobility assault gun that was developed to meet the operational requirements of the Swedish Army. It was designed and manufactured by Hägglund & Söner (whose military vehicle business is now BAE Systems Hägglunds) and employed common components with the Pbv 302 armoured personnel carrier series. The first prototypes of the ikv 91 were completed in 1969 with production running from 1975 until 1978. In total, 212 were manufactured.

== Designation ==
Infanterikanonvagn (lit. 'infantry cannon wagon') is the Swedish post 1940s term for assault gun, replacing the short-lived 1940s term stormartillerivagn (lit. 'assault artillery wagon') with the introduction of the ikv 72 in 1953.

The number 91 in the name means that it was the first assault gun in the Swedish armed forces to feature a cannon in the 9 cm caliber category (91 = 9-1: 9 cm gun, 1st vehicle in category).

== Design ==
The layout of the ikv 91 is similar to a large light tank. The ikv 91 is divided into three main compartments, the driver's station in the forward left hull, the fighting compartment located in the vehicle's midsection, and an engine compartment in the rear hull.

=== Armament ===
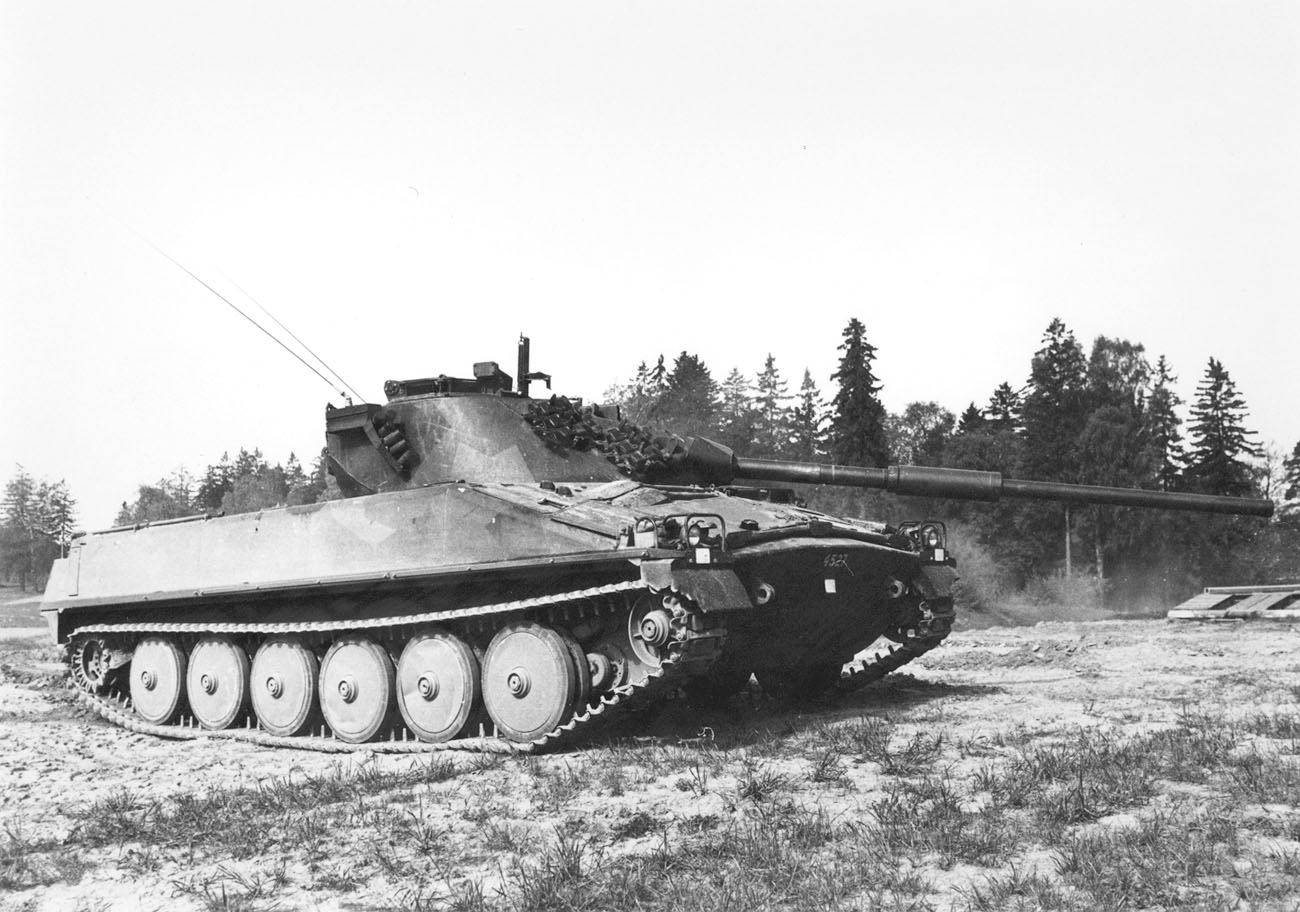
Side view showing the long, 54-calibre low pressure 90 mm main gun.

The main armament consisted of a Bofors KV 90 S 73 (Cannon, Wagon, 90 mm, Swe, m/73) 90 mm L/54 rifled low pressure gun, firing HEAT and HE rounds. A sloped revolving turret gave protection against projectiles up to 25 mm in calibre. The main gun had an elevation of +15° and depression of −10°. The barrel was equipped with a fume extractor. Additional armament of the ikv 91 included two 7.62 mm Browning machine guns; one in a coaxial mounting, and the second on a pintle attached to the loader's cupola. Two 71 mm Lyran flare mortars were mounted on the turret along with a set of smoke dischargers (usually 12). The vehicle was equipped with a laser rangefinder, night vision (goggles) and a computerised fire-control system for increased first-round hit probability. The ikv 91 fired at a rate of 8 rounds per minute and 59 rounds of 90 mm ammunition were carried internally. The vehicle was also capable of firing while in water, with the water absorbing most of the recoil. The turret itself has a small hatch that can be opened by the loader to eject used cartridge cases to prevent clutter in the vehicle.

=== Mobility ===
With wide tracks and a high power-to-weight ratio, the ikv 91 offered exceptionally good off-road mobility. The low ground pressure enabled the ikv 91 to operate through summer taiga and winter snow. The vehicle was fully amphibious with little preparation by the crew. Screens would be erected to stop water from entering the engine or to people inside it and the cabin compartment with a vane to protect from oncoming waves. The vehicle weighed 16.3 tonnes and had a crew of four. It was powered by a Volvo 12 liter, 330 hp, diesel engine. The maximum road speed was 65 kilometres per hour (40 mph) and the range on roads was about 500 kilometres (310 mi).

== Retirement ==
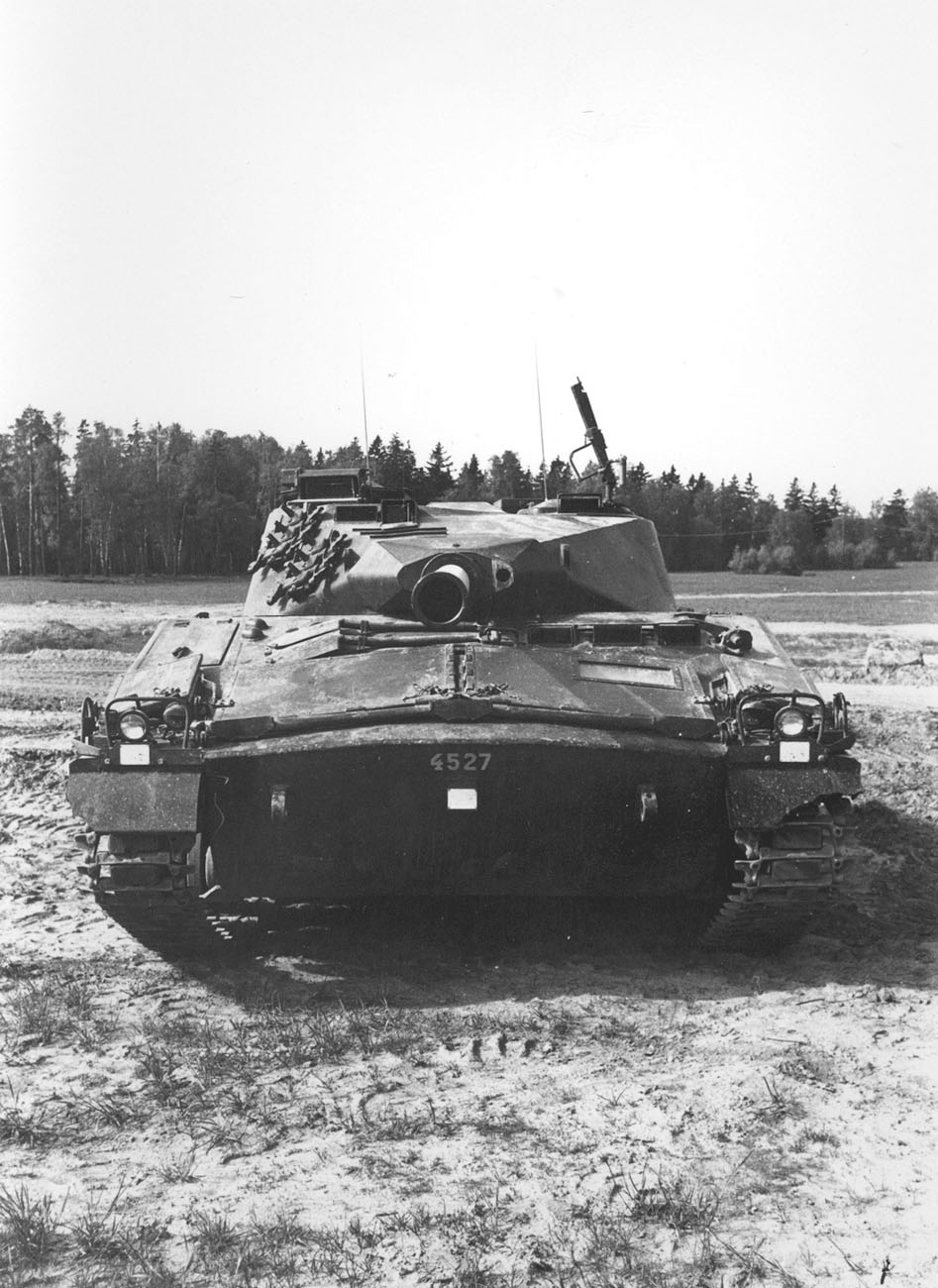
Vehicle frontal view

The ikv 91 was retired from the Swedish army in the late 1990s – early 2000s due to budget cuts will among others and was partly replaced by the strf 90 combat vehicles and Leopard 2 tanks. When in active duty, the ikv 91 was assigned to the Swedish infantry brigades, which had one company of 12 vehicles each. The 10th Mechanized Brigade had two companies in the 1980s. In the late 1980s and early 1990s, the 10th Mechanised Brigade had its ikv 91 replaced with Centurion tanks (Stridsvagn 102R & 104) and in 2000, all Swedish infantry brigades were disbanded.

== Ikv 91-105 ==
During the 1980s it became clear that the low velocity HEATFS-firing gun of the ikv 91 was not up to the task of fighting the new generations of Soviet made tanks. Thus plans were made to replace its 90 mm gun with a 105 mm gun or potentially even a TOW missile launcher. This was however not followed through in Swedish interests as it required heavy modifications and a new turret. The idea was put on hold until the 1990s when it became obsolete as the role of the ikv 91 could be filled by new strv 122 main battle tanks and strf 90 infantry fighting vehicles.

Besides Swedish interests, a prototype armed with a 105 mm gun was made in 1983 for export to India, simply named the ikv 91-105. The main gun was a fully stabilized Rheinmetall Rh 105-11 super-low recoil gun in a new turret. The weight was 18 tons and the speed in water was increased to 12 km/h from the regular ikv 91. It had an IR system by SAAB which gave it full night capability. Both the gunner and commander had monitors and could fire the main gun.

It was marketed for export and was tested by both India and the United States but was not purchased.

== See also ==
- List of tanks
- List of modern armoured fighting vehicles
- Swedish Armed Forces
