= Brummbär =

German heavy assault gun

Sturmpanzer
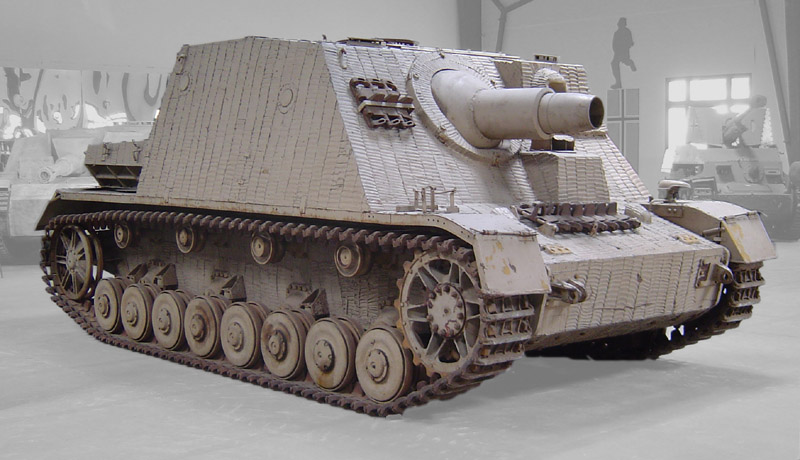
- Sturmpanzer with Zimmerit paste, displayed at the Musée des Blindés in Saumur, France.
- Type: Heavy assault gun
- Place of origin: Nazi Germany

Production history
- Designer: Alkett
- Designed: 1942–43
- Manufacturer: Vienna Arsenal (Series I–III); Deutsche Eisenwerke (Series IV)
- Produced: 1943–1945
- No. built: 306

Specifications
- Mass: 28.2 tonnes (62,170 lbs)
- Length: 5.93 metres (19 ft 5 in)
- Width: 2.88 metres (9 ft 5 in)
- Height: 2.52 metres (8 ft 3 in)
- Crew: 5 (driver, commander, gunner, 2 loaders)
- Armor: Front: 100 mm (3.93 in)
- Main armament: 15 cm StuH 43 L/12
- Secondary armament: Series IV: 1 7.92 mm (0.312 in) MG 34
- Engine: liquid-cooled V-12 Maybach HL120 TRM; 300 PS (296 hp, 220 kW)
- Power/weight: 10.64 PS/tonne
- Suspension: two-wheel leaf-spring bogies
- Fuel capacity: 470 L (100 imp gal; 120 US gal)
- Operational range: Road: 210 km (130 mi)
- Maximum speed: Road: 40 km/h (25 mph); Off-road: 24 km/h (15 mph)

The Sturmpanzer (also known as Sturmpanzer 43 or Sd.Kfz. 166) is a German armoured infantry support gun based on the Panzer IV chassis used in the Second World War. It was used at the Battles of Kursk, Anzio, Normandy, and was deployed in the Warsaw Uprising. It was known by the nickname Brummbär (German: "Grouch") (Note: Brummbär does not mean "Grizzly Bear"; a literal translation would be "grumbling bear", but the term is generally used in a figurative sense.) by Allied intelligence, a name which was not used by the Germans. German soldiers nicknamed it the "Stupa", a contraction of the term Sturmpanzer. Just over 300 vehicles were built and they were assigned to four independent battalions.

== Development ==
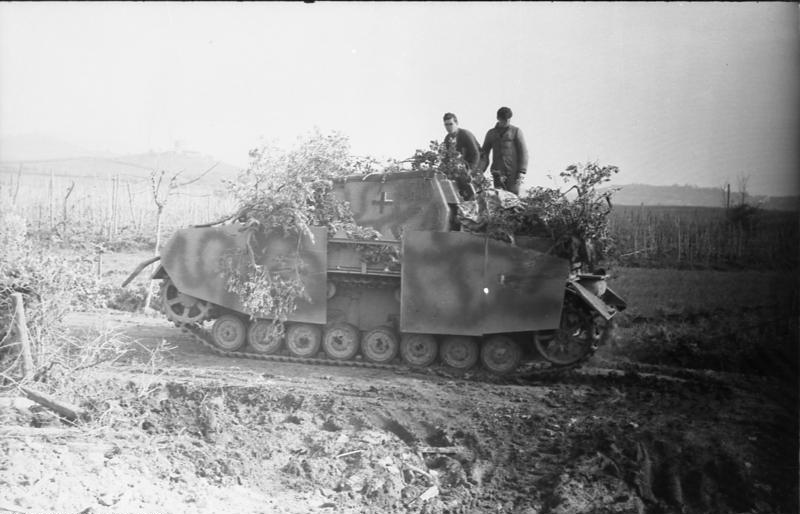
A Sturmpanzer in the Anzio-Nettuno area of Italy, March 1944.

The Sturmpanzer was a development of the Panzer IV tank designed to provide a vehicle offering direct infantry fire support, especially in urban areas. It used a Panzer IV chassis with the upper hull and turret replaced by a new casemate-style armoured superstructure housing a new gun, the 15-centimetre (5.9 in) Sturmhaubitze (StuH) 43 L/12 developed by Skoda. It fired the same shells as the 15 cm sIG 33 heavy infantry gun. Thirty-eight rounds, with separate propellant cartridges, could be carried. It used the Sfl.Zf. 1a sight. The combined weight of the shell and cartridge (38 kilograms (84 lb) for an HE shell and 8 kilograms (18 lb) for a propellant cartridge) made the work of the loader arduous, especially if the gun was elevated to a high angle.

An MG 34 machine gun was carried that could be fastened to the open gunner's hatch, much like the arrangement on the Sturmgeschütz III Ausf. G. Early vehicles carried an MP 40 sub-machine gun inside, which could be fired through firing ports in the side of the superstructure.

The driver's station projected forward from the casemate's sloped frontal armour plate and used the Tiger I's Fahrersehklappe 80 driver's sight. The fighting compartment was, albeit poorly, ventilated by natural convection, exiting out the rear of the superstructure through two armoured covers. Sideskirts were fitted on all vehicles.

Early vehicles were too heavy for the chassis, which led to frequent breakdowns of the suspension and transmission. Efforts were made to ameliorate this from the second series onwards, with some success.

In October 1943, it was decided that the StuH 43 gun needed to be redesigned to reduce its weight. A new version, some 800 kilograms (1,800 lb) lighter than the StuH 43, was built as the StuH 43/1. Some of the weight was saved by reducing the armour on the gun mount itself. This gun was used from the third production series onwards.

Zimmerit coating was applied to all vehicles until September 1944.

== Production series ==
=== First ===
Production of the first series of 60 vehicles began in April 1943. Fifty-two of these were built using new Panzer IV Ausf. G chassis and the remaining 8 from rebuilt Ausf. E and F chassis. Survivors, about half, were rebuilt beginning in December 1943; they were mostly rebuilt to 2nd series standards.

=== Second ===
Production restarted in December 1943 with another 60 vehicles, using only new Ausf. H chassis, and continued until March 1944. The Sturmpanzer's baptism in combat at the Battle of Kursk proved that the driver's compartment was too lightly armoured and it was reinforced. The gunner's hatch was removed and a ventilator fan was fitted, much to the relief of the crew. Internally sprung, steel-rimmed road wheels replaced the front two rubber-rimmed road wheels in an effort to reduce the stress on the forward suspension that was only partially successful.

=== Third ===
Production of the third series ran from March to June 1944 with few changes from the second series. The Fahrersehklappe 80 was replaced by periscopes and the lighter StuH 43/1 was used.

=== Fourth ===
The superstructure was redesigned in early 1944 for the fourth series, which used the chassis and HL120 TRM112 engine of the Ausf. J, and was in production between June 1944 and March 1945. It featured a redesigned gun collar, as well as a general reduction in height of the superstructure. This redesign also introduced a ball mount in the front superstructure for a MG 34 machine gun with 600 rounds. The vehicle commander's position was modified to use the cupola of the Sturmgeschütz III Ausf. G, which could mount a machine gun for anti-aircraft defense.

== Combat history ==
=== Sturmpanzer-Abteilung 216 ===
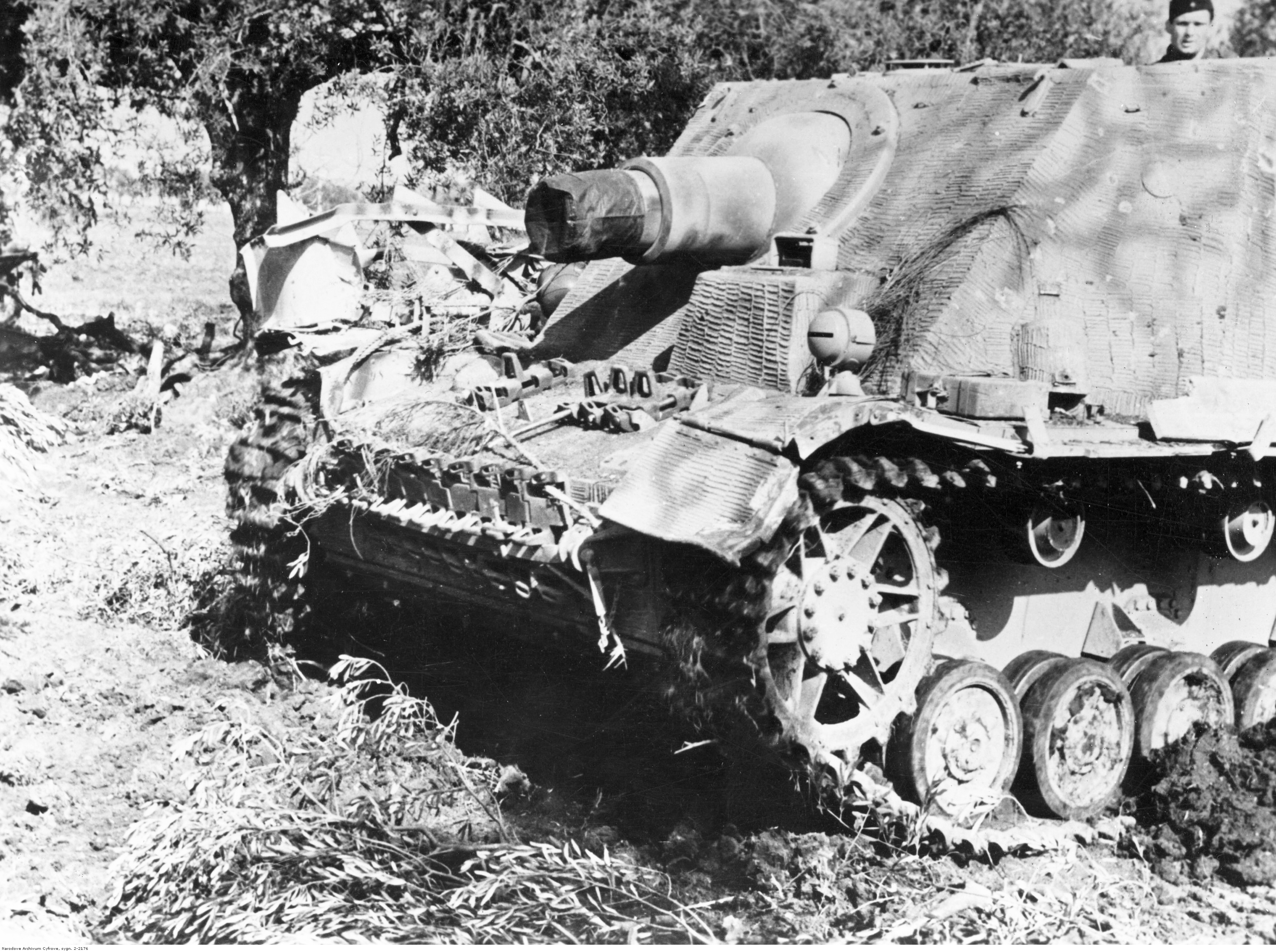
Brummbär in March 1944 deployed to contain the Allied beachhead after landings at Anzio.

The first unit to take the Sturmpanzer into battle was Sturmpanzer-Abteilung 216. It was formed at the end of April 1943 and transferred in early May to Amiens to train on its new assault guns. It was organized into 3 line companies, each with 14 vehicles, and a battalion headquarters with 3 vehicles. It arrived in Central Russia on 10 June 1943 to prepare for Unternehmen Zitadelle (Operation Citadel), the German attack on the Kursk salient. For this action, it was temporarily assigned as the third battalion of schweres Panzerjäger Regiment 656 ("Heavy Anti-tank Regiment 656") under the command of the 9th Army of Army Group Center.

It remained in the Orel-Bryansk area until its transfer to the Dnepropetrovsk-Zaporozhe area at the end of August. Its vehicles were refitted there and it remained there until the Zaporozhe Bridgehead was abandoned on 15 October. The battalion retreated to Nikopol, where it helped defend the German salient there until it was withdrawn back to the Reich at the end of December.

The Allied landing at Anzio on 22 January 1944 caused the battalion, fully independent once more, to be transferred there in early February with 28 vehicles to participate in the planned counterattack against the Allied beachhead, Operation Fischfang. This failed in its objective, but the battalion remained in Italy for the rest of the war. The battalion still had 42 vehicles on hand when the Allies launched their Po Valley offensive in April 1945, but all were blown up to prevent capture, or lost during the retreat, before the war ended in May.

=== Sturmpanzer-Abteilung 217 ===
Sturmpanzer-Abteilung 217 was formed on 20 April 1944 at the Grafenwöhr Training Area from cadres provided by Panzer-Kompanie 40 and Panzer-Ersatz Abteilung 18, although it did not have any armoured fighting vehicles until 19 Sturmpanzers were delivered at the end of May. It departed 1/2 July for the Normandy Front. It had to detrain in Condé sur Noireau, some 170 kilometres (110 mi) behind the front lines, because the Allies had heavily damaged the French rail network. Many of the battalion's vehicles broke down during the road march to the front lines. The first mention of Sturmpanzers in combat is on 7 August near Caen. On 19 August, the battalion had 17 Sturmpanzers operational and another 14 in maintenance. Most of the battalion was not trapped in the Falaise Pocket and managed to retreat to the northeast. It had only 22 vehicles in October, which were divided between the 1st and 2nd Companies; the surplus crews were sent to Panzer-Ersatz Abteilung 18. It participated in the Battle of the Bulge, only advancing as far as St. Vith. It was continually on the retreat for the rest of the war and was captured in the Ruhr Pocket in April 1945.

=== Sturmpanzer-Kompanie z.b.V. 218 ===
Sturmpanzer-Kompanie z.b.V. 218 was raised in August 1944. It was sent to Warsaw, where it was attached to Panzer Abteilung (Fkl) 302. It remained on the Eastern Front after the Warsaw Uprising was suppressed and was eventually wiped out in East Prussia in April 1945. It was supposed to have been the cadre for Sturmpanzer-Abteilung 218 in January 1945, but it was never pulled out of the front lines to do so.

Sturmpanzer-Kompanie z.b.V. 2./218 was raised simultaneously with Sturmpanzer-Kompanie z.b.V. 218, but was transferred to the Paris area on 20 August. Nothing is known of its service in France, but company personnel were sent to Panzer-Ersatz Abteilung 18 at the end of the year and were supposed to have been used in the formation of Sturmpanzer-Abteilung 218.

Sturmpanzer-Abteilung 218 was ordered formed on 6 January 1945 with three companies with a total of 45 Sturmpanzers, but it received Sturmgeschütz III assault guns during February instead.

=== Sturmpanzer-Abteilung 219 ===
Sturmpanzer-Abteilung 219 was originally to be formed from Sturmgeschütz-Brigade 914, but this was changed to Sturmgeschütz-Brigade 237 in September 1944. In mid-September 1944, the brigade transferred to the Döllersheim Training Area to reorganize and re-equip. Only ten Sturmpanzers had been received when the battalion was alerted on 15 October to participate in Unternehmen Panzerfaust, the German coup to forestall Hungary's attempt to surrender to the Allies. All the vehicles were given to the First Company and it departed for Budapest on the following day. Bomb damage to the rails delayed its arrival until 19 October, by which time it was no longer needed as a pro-German government had been installed. It was moved by rail to St. Martin, Slovakia for more training. The battalion was transferred to the vicinity of Stuhlweissenburg to relieve trapped German forces in Budapest. It remained in the vicinity of Budapest until forced to retreat by advancing Soviet forces.

== Surviving vehicles ==
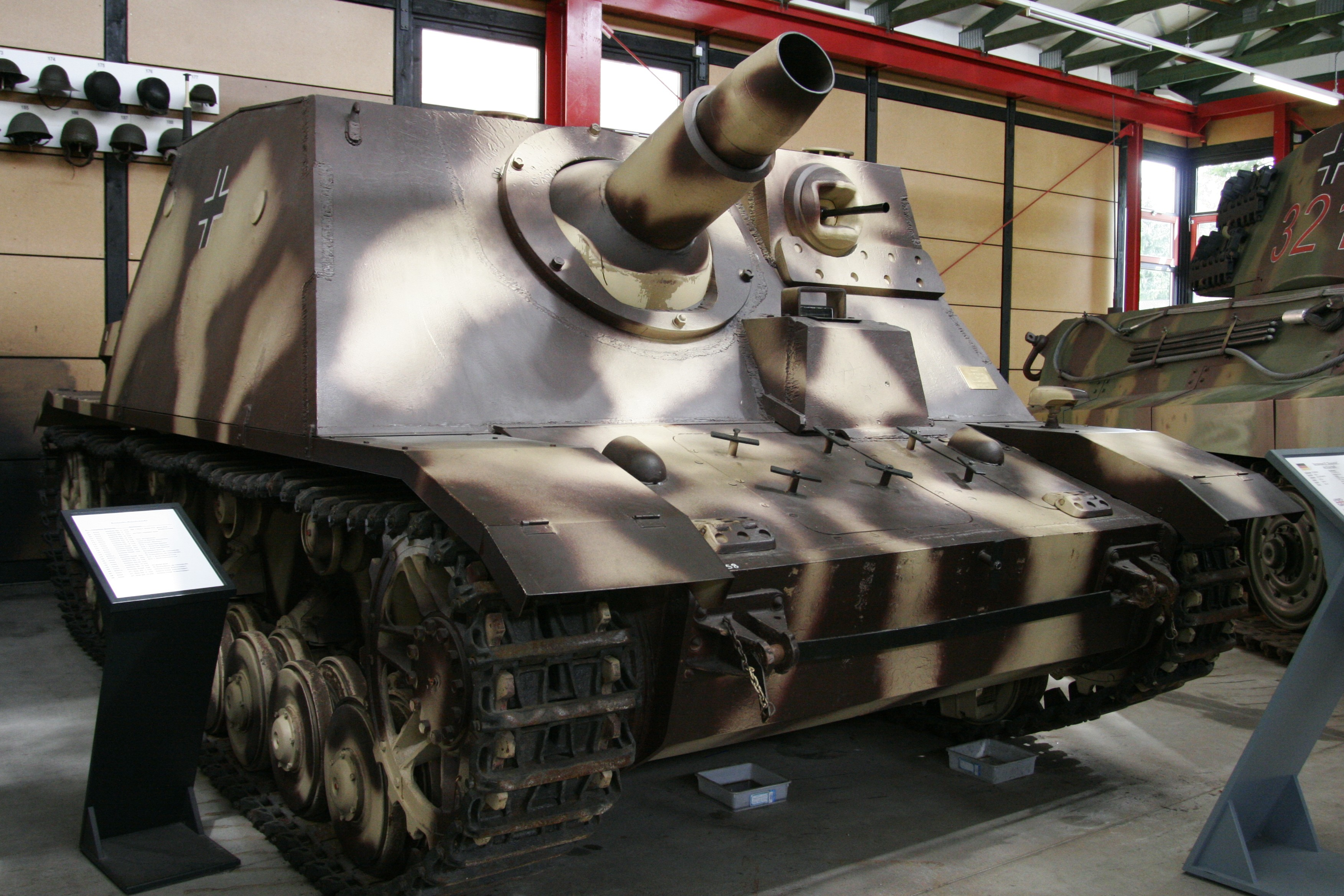
Sturmpanzer on display at the Deutsches Panzermuseum Munster, Germany

Four Sturmpanzers survive:

- Musée des Blindés in Saumur, France
- Deutsches Panzermuseum in Munster, Lower Saxony, Germany
- Patriot Park near Moscow
- The Fort Sill Field Artillery Museum in Fort Sill, Oklahoma, USA

== Sources ==
- Chamberlain, Peter, and Hilary L. Doyle. Thomas L. Jentz (Technical Editor). Encyclopedia of German Tanks of World War Two: A Complete Illustrated Directory of German Battle Tanks, Armoured Cars, Self-propelled Guns, and Semi-tracked Vehicles, 1933–1945. London: Arms and Armour Press, 1978 (revised edition 1993). ISBN 1-85409-214-6
- Jentz, Thomas L. Sturmgeschuetz: s.Pak to Sturmmoerser (Panzer Tracts 8). Darlington Productions, 1999 ISBN 1-892848-04-X
- Trojca, Waldemar and Jaugitz, Markus. Sturmtiger and Sturmpanzer in Combat. Katowice, Poland: Model Hobby, 2008 ISBN 978-83-60041-29-1
