= Sturm-Infanteriegeschütz 33B =

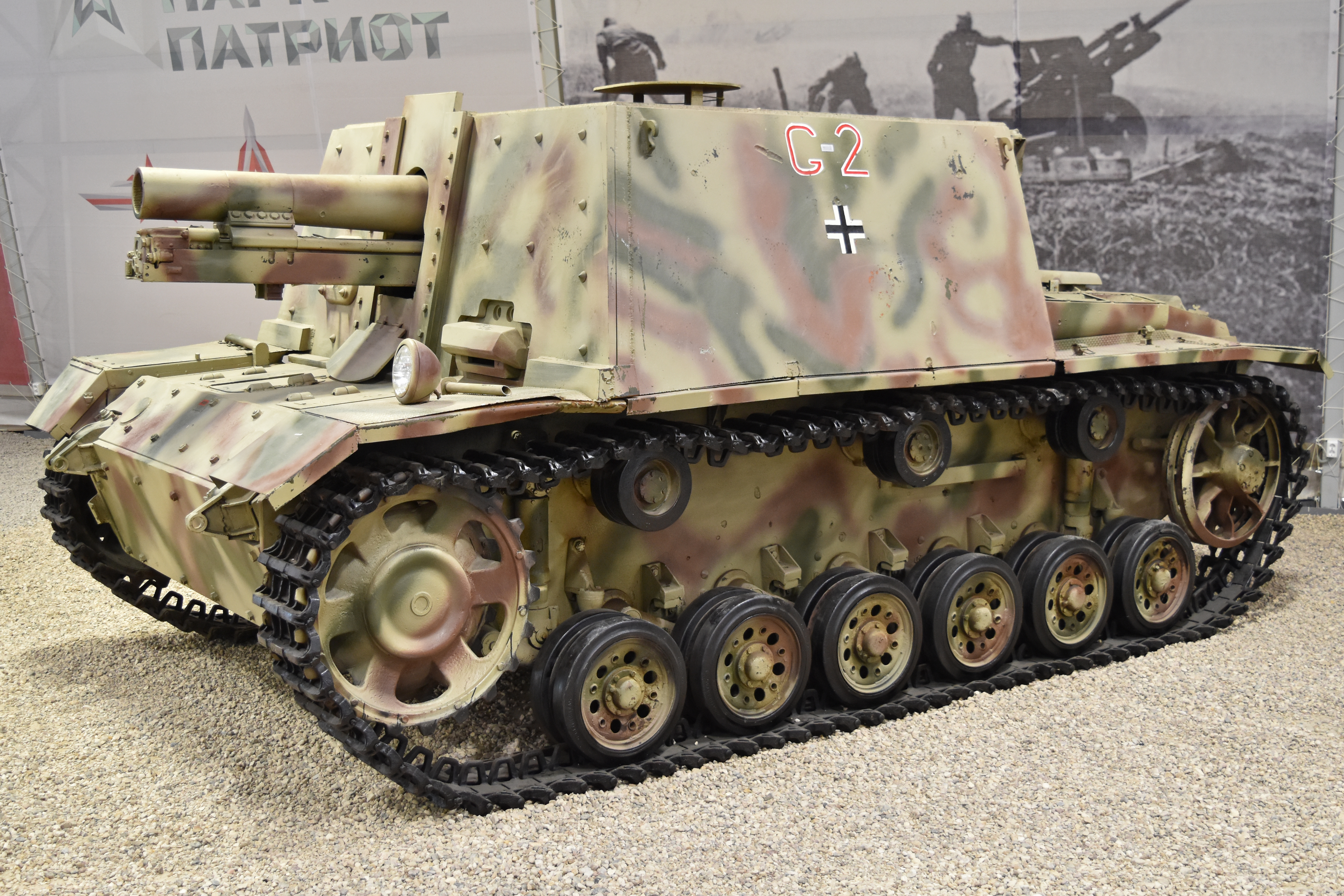
- sIG 33B in Kubinka
- Type: Heavy assault gun
- Place of origin: Nazi Germany

Service history
- In service: 1942–1944
- Used by: Nazi Germany
- Wars: World War II

Production history
- Designer: Alkett
- Designed: 1941–1942
- Manufacturer: Alkett
- Produced: 1942
- No. built: 24

Specifications
- Mass: 21 tonnes (21 long tons; 23 short tons)
- Length: 5.4 metres (17 ft 9 in)
- Width: 2.9 metres (9 ft 6 in)
- Height: 2.3 metres (7 ft 7 in)
- Crew: 5
- Armor: 10–80 millimetres (0.39–3.15 in)
- Main armament: 1 × 15 cm sIG 33/1
- Secondary armament: 1 × 7.92 mm Maschinengewehr 34
- Engine: 12-cylinder Maybach HL120 TRM; 300 PS (296 hp, 221 kW)
- Power/weight: 14.3 PS/tonne
- Transmission: 6 forward, 1 reverse gears
- Suspension: torsion-bar
- Operational range: 110 kilometres (68 mi)
- Maximum speed: 20 kilometres per hour (12 mph)

The Sturm-Infanteriegeschütz 33B ("Assault Infantry Gun 33B"), was a German self-propelled heavy assault gun used during World War II.

== Design and development ==
A new, fully enclosed, and heavily armored boxy casemate superstructure was built on the chassis of the Sturmgeschütz III. It mounted the improved sIG 33/1 infantry gun, offset to the right side, for which 30 rounds were carried. It could only traverse 3° left and right, elevate 25°, and depress 6°. A MG 34 machine-gun was fitted in a ball mount to the right of the main gun with 600 rounds. Its traverse limits were 15° left and 20° right, and it could elevate 20° and depress 10°.

Sources differ as to the development history. Chamberlain and Doyle say that Alkett was ordered in July 1941 to convert a dozen Sturmgeschütz III Ausf. E chassis and that these were finished in December 1941 and January 1942 - but not issued. On 20 September 1942, another dozen Sturmgeschutz IIIs were ordered to be converted, and the existing vehicles were rebuilt. Trojca and Jaugitz contend that all twenty-four were built by Alkett starting in September 1942 from repaired Sturmgeschütz III Ausf. B, C, D and E chassis.

== Combat history ==
The first dozen were delivered by the end of October 1942 and assigned to Sturmgeschütz-Abteilungen (Assault Gun Battalions) 177 and 244, then fighting in Stalingrad. The remaining dozen vehicles could not be delivered to Sturmgeschütz-Abteilungen 243 and 245, also fighting in Stalingrad, after the Soviets surrounded the German 6th Army on 21 November. Instead, the vehicles were formed into Sturm-Infanterie-Geschütz-Batterie/Lehr-Bataillon (Assault Infantry Gun Batterie/Demonstration Battalion) XVII. The battalion was assigned to the 22nd Panzer Division as the Germans attempted to relieve the trapped 6th Army. The division was virtually wiped out in the fighting and the battery was assigned to the 23rd Panzer Division where it became the Sturm-Infanterie-Geschütz-Batterie/Panzer-Regiment 201 (also known as 9. Kompanie/Panzer-Regiment 201) for the rest of the war. The last strength report to mention them lists five remaining in September 1944.

== Surviving vehicles ==
Of the five remaining in September 1944, one survives at the Kubinka NIIBT Research Collection near Moscow.

== Sources ==
- Chamberlain, Peter, and Hilary L. Doyle. Thomas L. Jentz (Technical Editor). Encyclopedia of German Tanks of World War Two: A Complete Illustrated Directory of German Battle Tanks, Armoured Cars, Self-propelled Guns, and Semi-tracked Vehicles, 1933–1945. London: Arms and Armour Press, 1978 (revised edition 1993). ISBN 1-85409-214-6
- Trojca, Waldemar and Jaugitz, Markus. Sturmtiger and Sturmpanzer in Combat. Katowice, Poland: Model Hobby, 2008 ISBN 978-83-60041-29-1
