= Infantry support gun =

Artillery weapons used to increase firepower of infantry units

Infantry support guns or battalion guns are artillery weapons designed and used to increase the firepower of the infantry units they are intrinsic to, offering immediate tactical response to the needs of the unit's commanding officer. They typically have short, low-velocity barrels, and light construction carriages, allowing them to be more easily manoeuvered on the battlefield. They are generally used for direct fire, rather than the indirect fire of other types of artillery. Their role has generally been replaced by tanks using tank guns, infantry fighting vehicles using autocannons, other combat vehicles, mortars, recoilless rifles, rocket-propelled grenades, and shoulder-launched missiles.

== Infantry support guns ==
=== Development history ===
Infantry support guns were the first type of artillery employed by armed forces, initially in China, and later brought to Europe by the Mongol invasion. In their initial form, they lacked carriages or wheels, and were simple cast barrels called pots de fer in French, or vasi in Italian. These weapons were relatively small, immobile, and fired large bolts or quarrels. Along with increases in the sizes of ordnance (the barrels) came the requirement of easier transportation. This led to two divergent approaches, the very light hand-gun, and eventually the arquebus, while another avenue of development led to the light ordnance, now on wheeled carriages, such as the 2-pounder Culvern moyane, the 1-pounder falcon, and the 3/4-pounder falconet. These lighter Renaissance pieces eventually led to the development of the 3-pounder and 4-pounder regimental guns of the 17th century as well as the leather cannon, notably in the army of Gustavus Adolphus. The light field guns of the 17th century, commonly known as a drake in England, came in almost 100 different calibres, with each having its own distinct name, some of which were:

5-pound, 3 1/2-inch saker, weighing 1 ton
4-pound, 3-inch minion, weighing 3/4 ton
2-pound, 2 3/4-inch falcon, weighing 1/4 ton
1-pound, 2-inch falconet, weighing 200 pounds (91 kg)
3/4-pound, 1 1/4-inch robinet, weighing 100 pounds (45 kg)

The saker and falcon had point-blank ranges of 330 and 290 metres (360 and 320 yd), and 1,980 and 1,760 metres (2,170 and 1,920 yd) extreme ranges respectively.

Although oxen were used to haul the heavier field and siege ordnance, some on wagons rather than limbers, they were too slow to keep up with the infantry, and so horses were used to pull the lighter pieces, leading to the development of the artillery carriage and horse team that survived until the late 19th century.

=== 17th- to 19th-century development ===
The first School of Artillery in Venice was opened early in the 16th century, and by the late 17th century the different old names of the lighter ordnance were abandoned, and replaced with the French canon, or cannon.

The first regimental guns in English service were ordered by King James II in 1686; two 3-pounders for each of the seven regiments (of one battalion each) encamped in Hyde Park. Attachment of guns to the infantry had practical reasons also. While the allocation of horses was reckoned at one for each 350–500 pounds of ordnance and its carriage, this was only true for availability of good horses and good roads, both in short supply due to unscrupulous civilian contractors and lack of road building technology. In cases where the work was excessive for horses alone, infantry would join them in pulling the guns, calculated at 80 lbs per infantryman, a load which remains at the upper limit of the average light infantry unit requirement today.

The 3-pounder Grasshopper cannon was in use with British forces in the 18th century. Each British infantry battalion had an officer and 34 non commissioned officers and other ranks trained by the Royal Artillery to handle the two 3- or light 6-pounder guns battalion guns.

Frederick the Great of Prussia was the first to introduce artillery tactics for the regimental guns which were to accompany the infantry units as part of his reform of the Prussian artillery as a whole before and during the Seven Years' War. This included the determination that canister shot was only effective at a range of 100 yards, same as that of the musket range, and therefore put the gunners into the environment of direct infantry combat due to Frederick's insistence that artillery should participate in the infantry attack.

In 1732 Florent-Jean de Vallière standardized French artillery ordnance (barrels) into five calibers. The lightest piece was the Vallière 4-pounder and the heavier cannons were 8-, 12-, 16- and 24-pounders. The 4-pounder proved too heavy to be employed as a battalion gun so Swedish 4-pounders were used for that purpose beginning in 1757. Two years later the French began using the 1-pdr Rostaing gun but it only had limited service.

Manufacture of the ordnance was also revolutionised by the early-18th century invention of the boring mechanism by the Swiss gun-founder Moritz of Geneva which allowed for a far greater precision achieved in the casting, in essence creating a huge lathe on which the barrel casting turned instead of the boring tool. Manufacture of cannonballs was also improved so the projectiles were now well-fitted to the bore of the ordnance, and after conducting experiments with gunpowder, the powder charges were determined to be one-third the weight of the shot (cannonball).

Frederick's artillery doctrine influenced the development of the French artillery troops, and after 1764 Jean Baptiste Vaquette de Gribeauval, the first Inspector of Artillery, after conducting trials in Strasbourg, reorganised French artillery units to provide them with greater mobility, changing length of the barrels to standard 18-calibre length, including the regimental 4-pounders. These were now pulled by four horses and used large six-wheeled vehicles that also included the caissons. The system of ordnance, carriages, ball, and powder charges introduced by de Gribeauval remained virtually unaltered through the French Revolutionary Wars and Napoleonic Wars.

General Augustin Lespinasse on battalion guns: "If you want to prevent your troops from manouevering, embarrass them with guns ... A line of infantry supported by good, properly established batteries retains its order of battle better"

=== 20th-century development ===
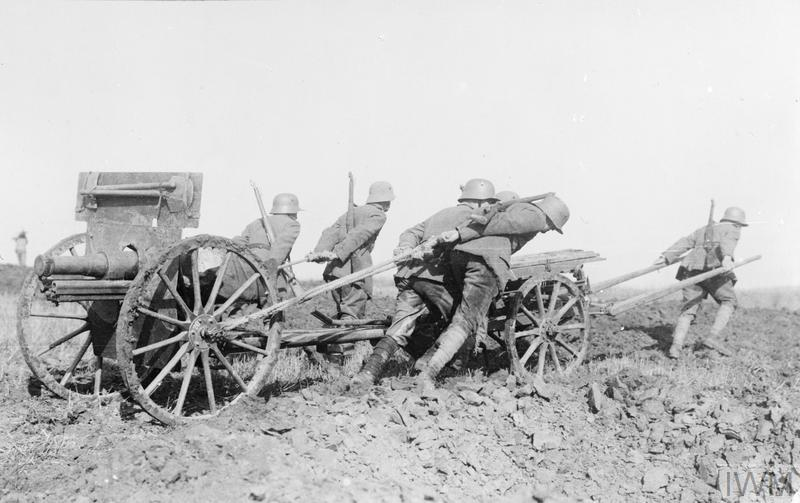
German stormtroopers with a modified Russian M1909 mountain gun, c.1916–1918

Infantry support guns drew much interest in course of World War I because of the developments in trench warfare. In addition to the usual requirements that they needed to be portable enough to be carried by infantry, two separate capabilities were desired. First, it needed to engage in high angle indirect fire, especially given the prevalence of trenches. Second, it needed to be capable of low angle direct fire, while being carried by assault infantry, to engage strongpoints, bunkers, and other fortifications. Some infantry support guns that appeared between world wars, such as the German 7.5 cm leichtes Infanteriegeschütz 18 and Japanese Type 92 battalion gun were designed to meet all these requirements simultaneously and saw action during WWII.

== List of infantry support guns ==
=== Belgium ===
- Canon de 76 FRC

The Canon de 76 FRC was a Belgian infantry support gun, produced by the Fonderie Royale des Canons (FRC). The gun was typically of 76 mm calibre; however, an optional 47 mm barrel could be fitted instead. The gun was designed for transport via a trailer towed by a vehicle. In 1940, the Wehrmacht redesignated these as 7.6 cm IG 260(b).

=== France ===
- Canon d'Infanterie de 37 modèle 1916 TRP

The Canon d'Infantrie de 37 modele 1916 TRP (37mm mle.1916) was a French infantry support gun, first used during World War I. The gun was used by a number of forces during and after the war. The US acquired a number of these guns, which they designated 37mm M1916; however, by 1941 the US Army had put these into storage (or scrapped them). Poland fielded a number. In 1940, the Wehrmacht began using these as 3.7 cm IG 152(f). During the First World War, the Japanese Type 11 was based on this design.

=== Germany ===
- 7.5 cm leichtes Infanteriegeschütz "L/13"
- 7.5 cm leichtes Infanteriegeschütz 18
- 7.5 cm Infanteriegeschütz 37
- 15 cm schweres Infanteriegeschütz 33
- 7.6 cm IG 260(b)

=== Japan ===
- Type 11 37 mm infantry gun (heavily inspired by France's Canon d'Infantrie de 37 modele 1916 TRP)
- Type 92 Battalion Gun

=== Imperial Russia ===
- 37 mm trench gun M1915

=== Italy ===
- Cannone da 47/32 M35
- Cannone da 65/17 modello 13
- Cannone da 70/15

=== Soviet Union ===
- 76.2-mm regimental gun M1927
- 37 mm anti-tank gun M1930 (1-K)
- 76.2-mm regimental gun M1943

=== United Kingdom ===
- 1.59 inch Breech-Loading Vickers Q.F. Gun, Mk II ("Vickers-Crayford rocket gun")

=== United States ===
- M1916 37mm gun
- 37 mm Gun M3
- M116 howitzer
- 105 mm Howitzer M3

== Modern times ==
Very few support guns are still in service with infantry units, as their roles have been largely replaced by rocket-propelled grenades, grenade launchers, anti-tank guided missiles, Recoilless rifles, howitzers, and mortars. Heavier wire-guided missiles are used to engage point targets, such as structures.

Most pack guns (guns designed to be disassembled into multiple parts for easier movement over terrain) and airborne guns (guns designed for use by paratroopers by being either disassemblable for deployment or especially light, or both) are infantry support guns, but these types are also obsolete.

== See also ==
- Assault gun
- Field gun
- Self-propelled gun

== Cited works and general references ==
- Chandler, David G. The Campaigns of Napoleon, Volume 1. Simon and Schuster, 1966.
- Chartrand, René; Hutchins, Ray (2003). Napoleon's Guns, 1792–1815. Oxford, UK: Osprey Publishing. ISBN 9781841764580.
- The Corps of Royal Engineers, Aide-mémoire to the Military Sciences: Framed from Contributions of Officers of the Different Services, Volume II, Lockwood & Co., London, 1860
- Deane, John, Deanes' Manual of the History and Science of Fire-arms ..., Longman, Brown, Green, Longmans & Roberts, London, 1858
- Haythornthwaite, Philip J. & Fosten, Bryan Wellington's Specialist Troops Osprey Publishing, 24/11/1988
- Hicks, James Ernest, What the Citizen Should Know about Our Arms and Weapons, Andre Jandot (illustrator), W. W. Norton & Company, Inc., 1941
- Rogers, H.C.B., Col., Artillery Through the Ages, Seeley, Service & Co., Ltd, London, 1971
