= 3.7 cm Infanteriegeschütz M.15 =

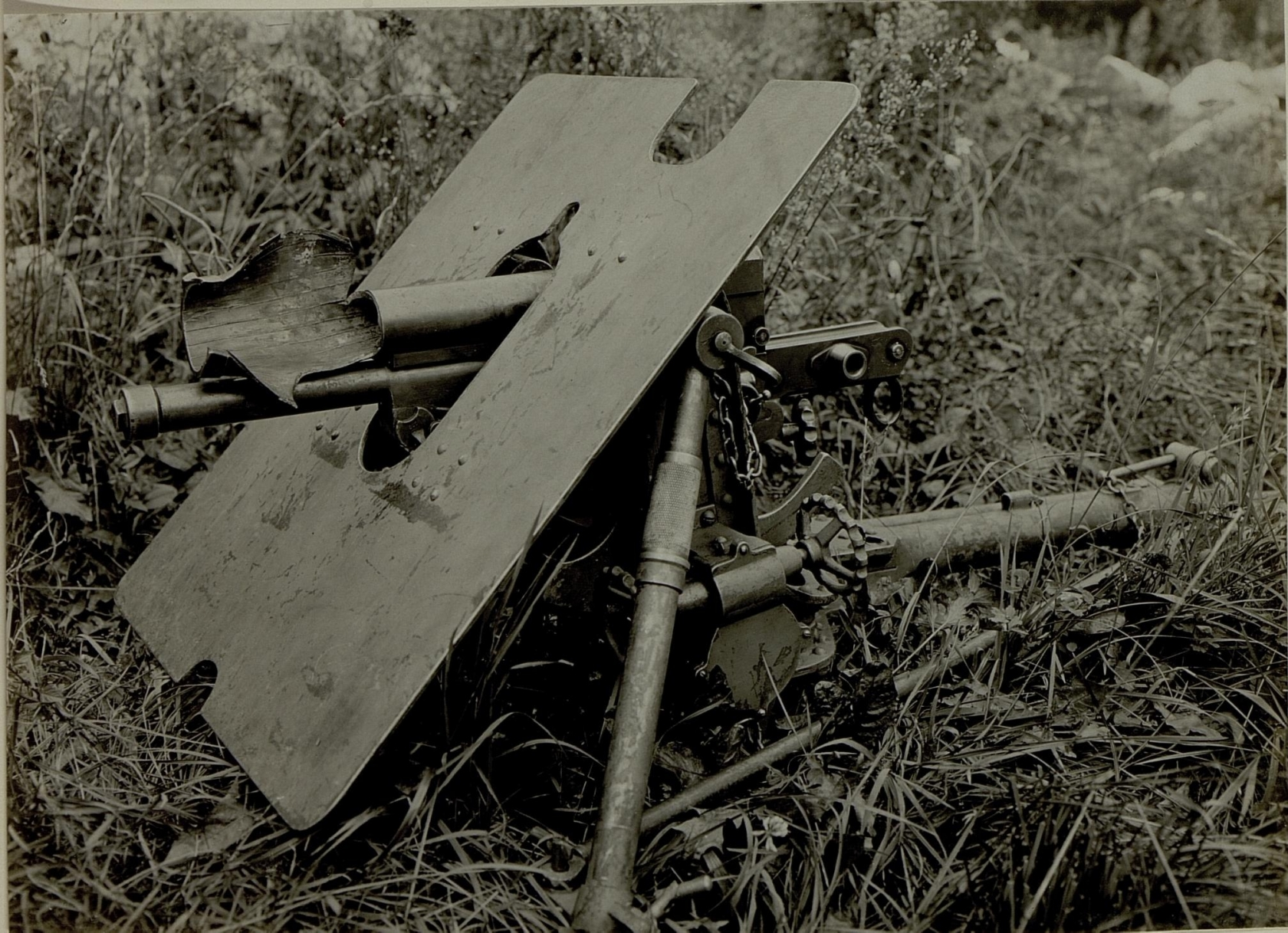
- Damaged Infanteriegeschütz M.15 in 1916
- Type: Infantry support gun
- Place of origin: Austria-Hungary

Service history
- Used by: Austria-Hungary; Kingdom of Italy; Poland
- Wars: World War I Polish–Soviet War; World War II

Production history
- Designer: Škoda
- Designed: 1915
- Manufacturer: Škoda; ČKD (ARET) (AREN); F.lli Marzoli
- Produced: 1916
- No. built: 1,000

Specifications
- Mass: Complete:84.3 kg (186 lb); Barrel: 34.6 kg (76 lb); Cradle: 25.3 kg (56 lb); Tripod: 24.4 kg (54 lb)
- Barrel length: 320 mm (13 in) L/10
- Crew: 3
- Shell: Fixed QF 37x57mm R
- Shell weight: 650 g (1 lb 7 oz)
- Breech: Vertical sliding block
- Recoil: Hydro-spring
- Carriage: Tripod
- Elevation: 0° to +45°
- Traverse: 28°
- Rate of fire: 20 rpm
- Muzzle velocity: 175 m/s (574 ft/s)
- Effective firing range: 2,200 m (2,406 yd)
- Sights: Periscope

The 3.7 cm Infanteriegeschütz M.15 was an Austro-Hungarian cannon developed for use in the trenches during the First World War. The name indicates the caliber in centimeters, the gun's role Infanteriegeschütz which in German means infantry support gun and the model according to the year of introduction. Captured Austrian guns and Italian produced copies were first designated Cannon 37F and later as 37/10 F. Mod. 1915 in the 1930s.

== History ==
The 3.7 cm Infanteriegeschütz M.15 was designed with the peculiarities of trench warfare in mind. Infantry in WWI often faced well protected lines of trenches, defended by machine gun nests with interlocking fields of fire. These machine gun nest could be constructed of sandbags, timber, corrugated metal and concrete with overhead protection. For infantry advancing across no man's land against these positions, all they may see is a small horizontal opening at about waist level, with just the top of the machine gun's gun shield showing. Infantry would have to close on these positions while under fire and destroy them with rifle fire, grenades, and flamethrowers. The combatants experimented with mortars, rifle grenades, and mountain guns in search of an answer but these positions could only be defeated by direct-fire artillery support. Small caliber mountain guns and mortars such as the Skoda 75 mm Model 15 and the German 7.58 cm Minenwerfer showed promise, but their size and weight combined with the roughness of the terrain weighed against their use.

The Austro-Hungarian Army's answer to this need was the 3.7 cm Infanteriegeschütz M.15 which was based on the earlier 3.7 cm Gebirgskanone M.13 and soon after its introduction other nations introduced similar infantry support guns such as the French Canon d'Infanterie de 37 modèle 1916 TRP, the Russian 37 mm trench gun M1915, and the German 3.7 cm TAK 1918. The precision of the 3.7 cm Infanteriegeschütz M.15 compensated for the reduced caliber of the ammunition and the lightness of the piece allowing it to be transported during assaults, unlike the mountain guns used until then in the same role. In November 1915 the first prototypes from Škoda were tested by the Austro-Hungarian Army on the Italian front. In 1916 1,000 guns were ordered and produced by Škoda and ČKD and sent to the front during the same year.

Austrian guns captured by the Royal Italian Army were quickly put into service by their Alpine troops. At the same time a direct copy was placed in production at Arsenal Regio Esercito di Turin (ARET), Arsenal Regio Esercito di Napoli (AREN) and by the private company F.lli Marzoli of Palazzolo sull'Oglio. Although obsolete after WWI, a number were still in service when Italy entered World War II in 1940.

== Organization ==
In the Austro-Hungarian Army, it was expected that the staff of each infantry regiment would include two armed platoons, which was reduced to one because of a lack of arms. Each platoon was made up of an officer, two non-commissioned officers, 26 soldiers, four cannons, cart and four pack animals.

== Design ==
The gun barrel was made of steel, with 12 left-hand groove rifling and a vertical sliding block breech. There is a tubular steel tripod, with two adjustable lateral legs and a central leg, equipped with a recoil spade. The tail of the tripod can be laid either in front of the gun or behind the gun. Underneath the gun barrel there's a hydro-spring recoil system, a hand wheel for elevation, and aiming is through a periscope. The tripod can be fitted with a steel gun shield, while two wheels can be fitted for transport. The legs of the tripod fold so the gun can be towed by man, pack animal or a two dog team. The gun could be dismantled into three packs for transports: barrel, cradle, and tripod, each weighing 34.6 kg (76 lb), 25.3 kg (56 lb) and 24.4 kg (54 lb). The gun fired Fixed QF 37×57 mm R ammunition, available in high-explosive, shrapnel and tracer which were carried in wooden crates of 15 projectiles, weighing 26.5 kg (58 lb 7 oz), a development which could be considered an early equivalent to today's grenade cartridges such as the 35×32mmSR and 40×53mmSR shells.

== Photo Gallery ==
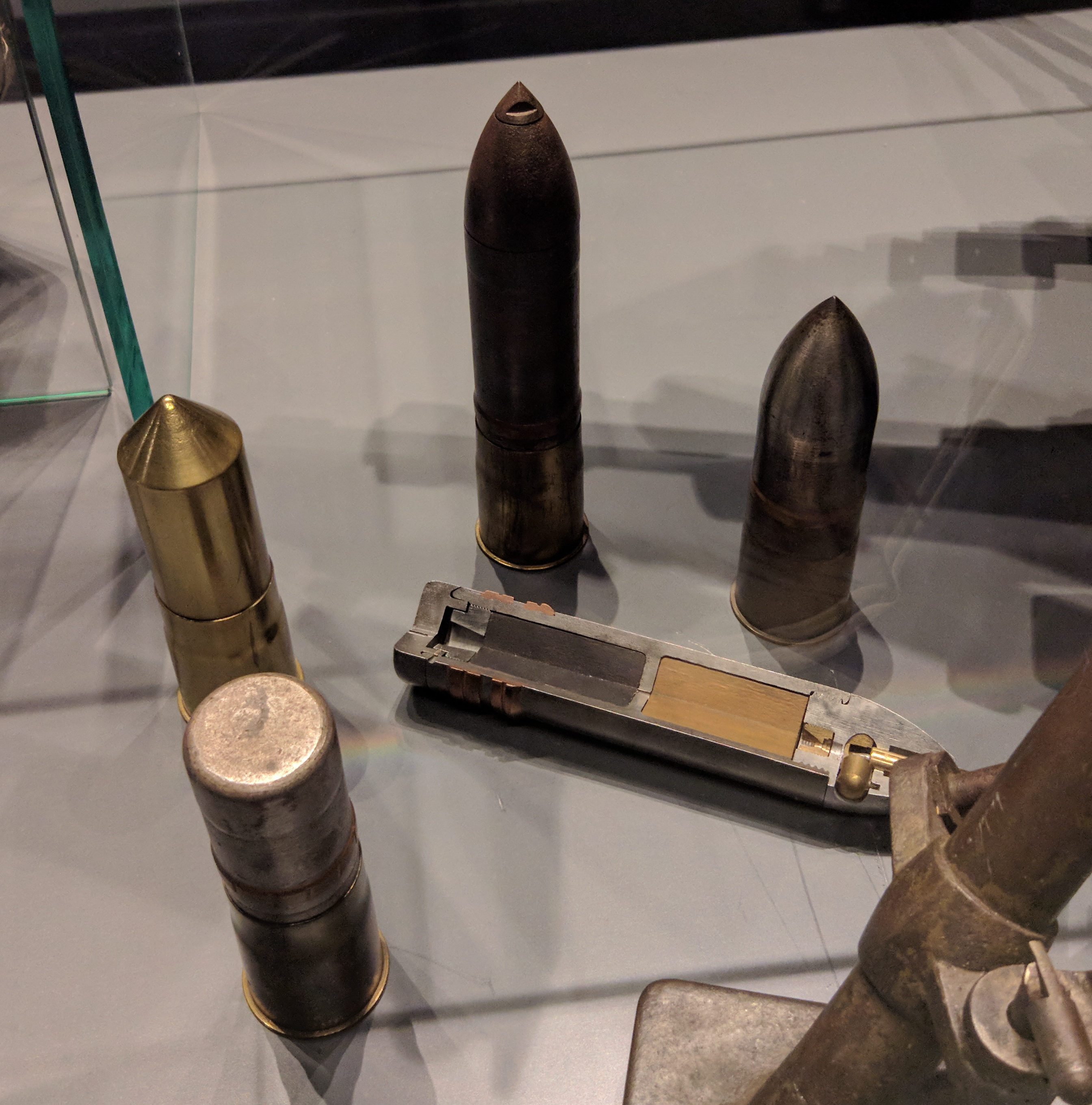
M15 ammunition at a museum in Vienna.

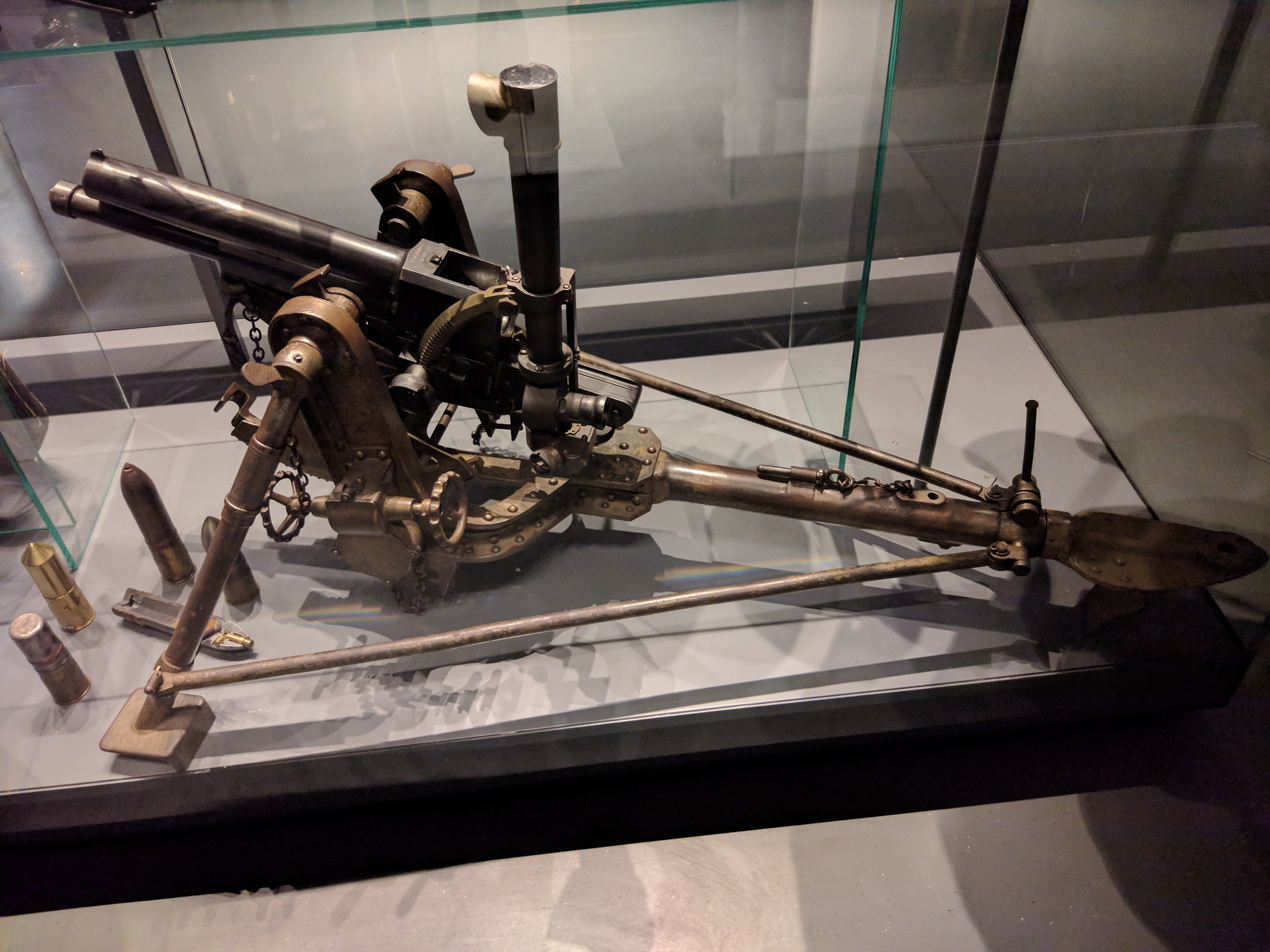
M15 at a museum in Vienna.

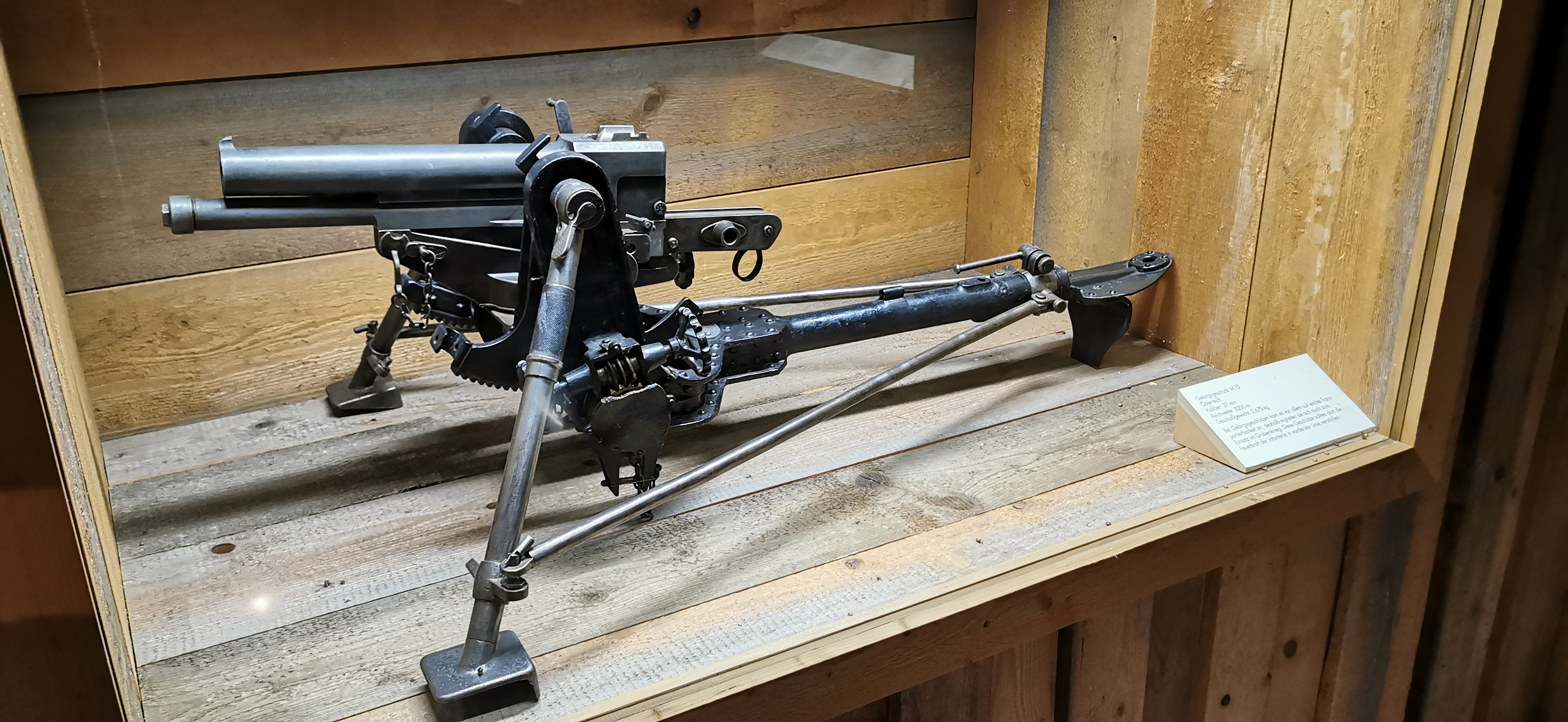
M15 at Bayerisches Armeemuseum.

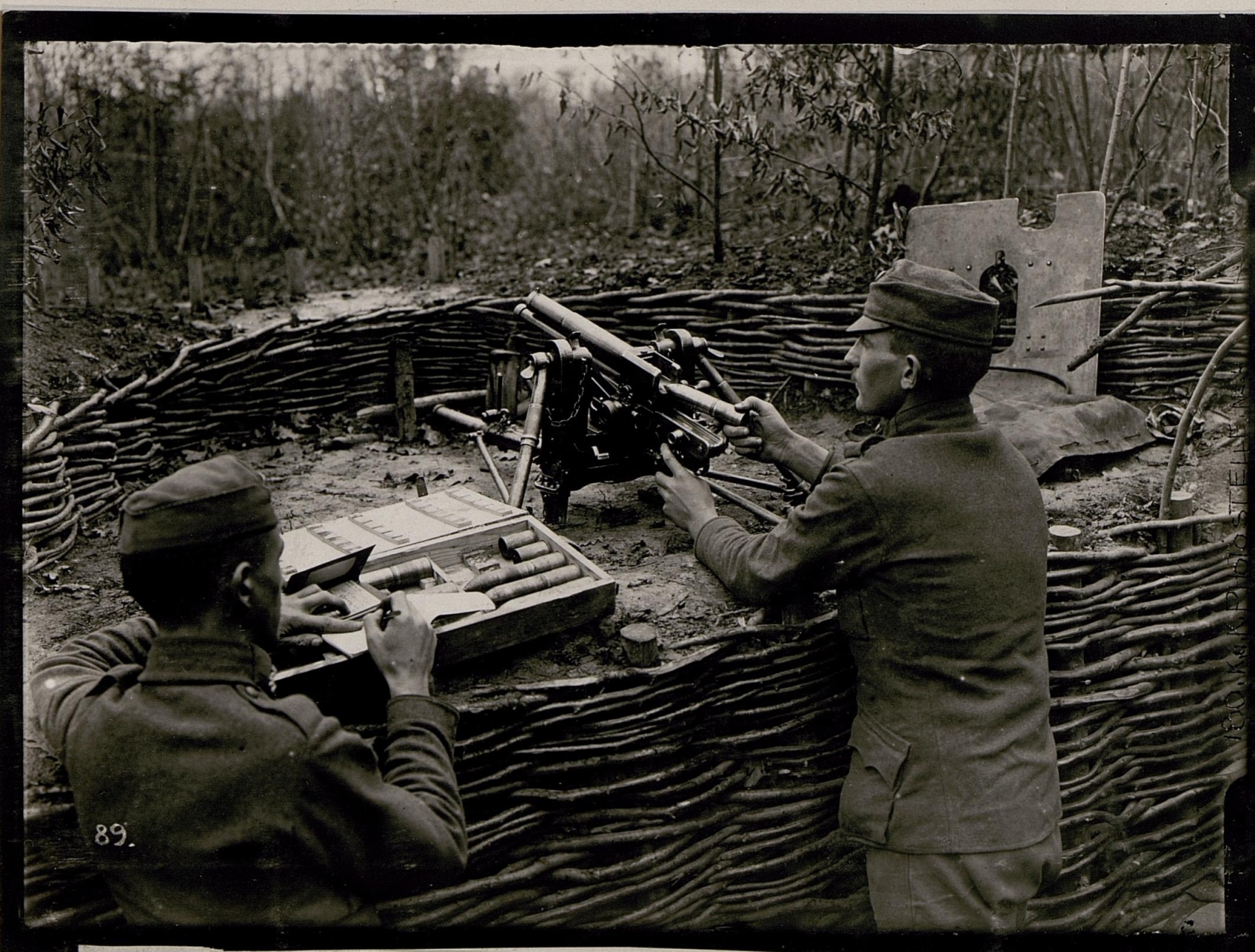
M15 with its tail folded forward in a trench.

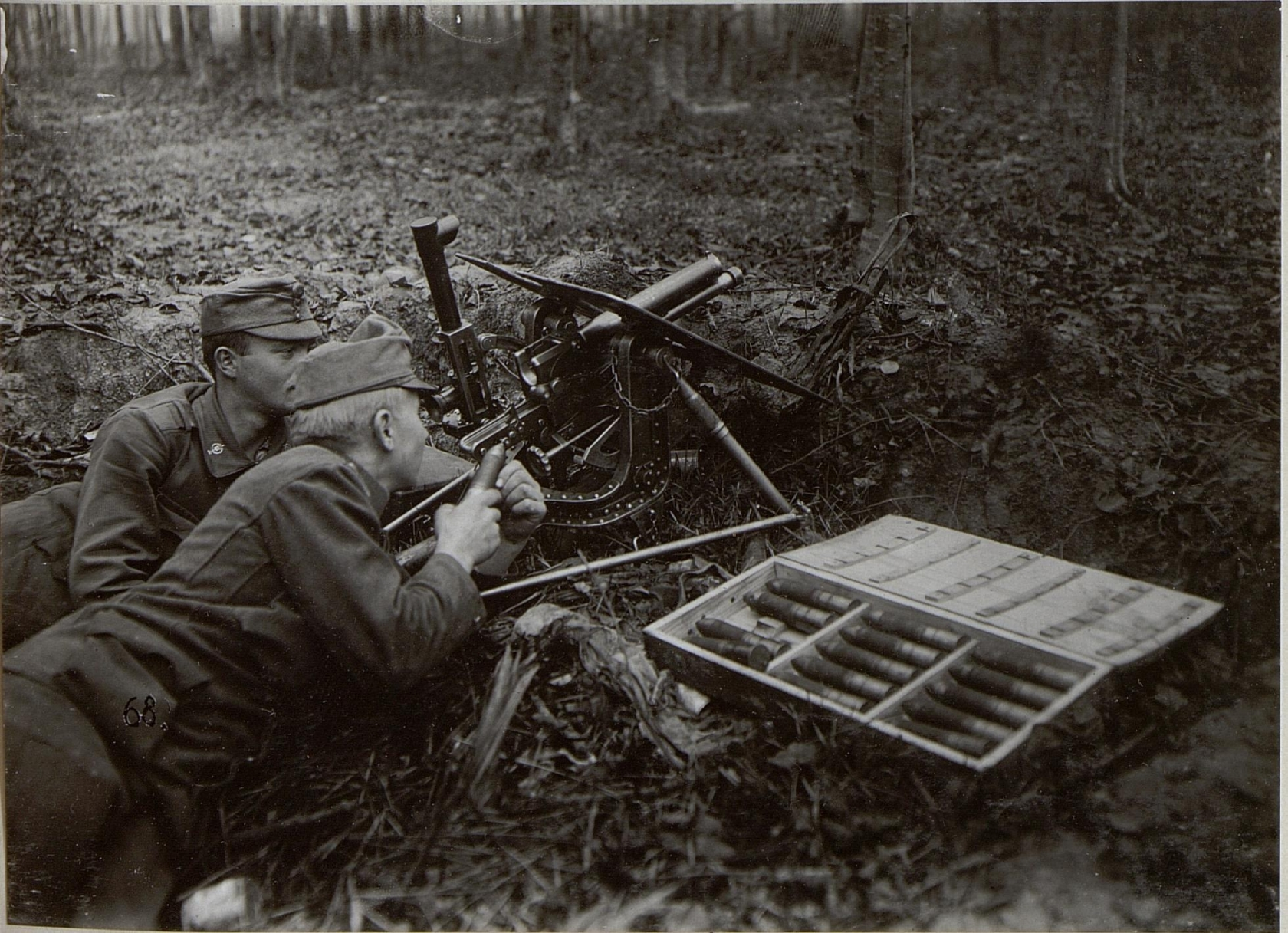
M15 with a gun shield and its trail folded backward in a forest.

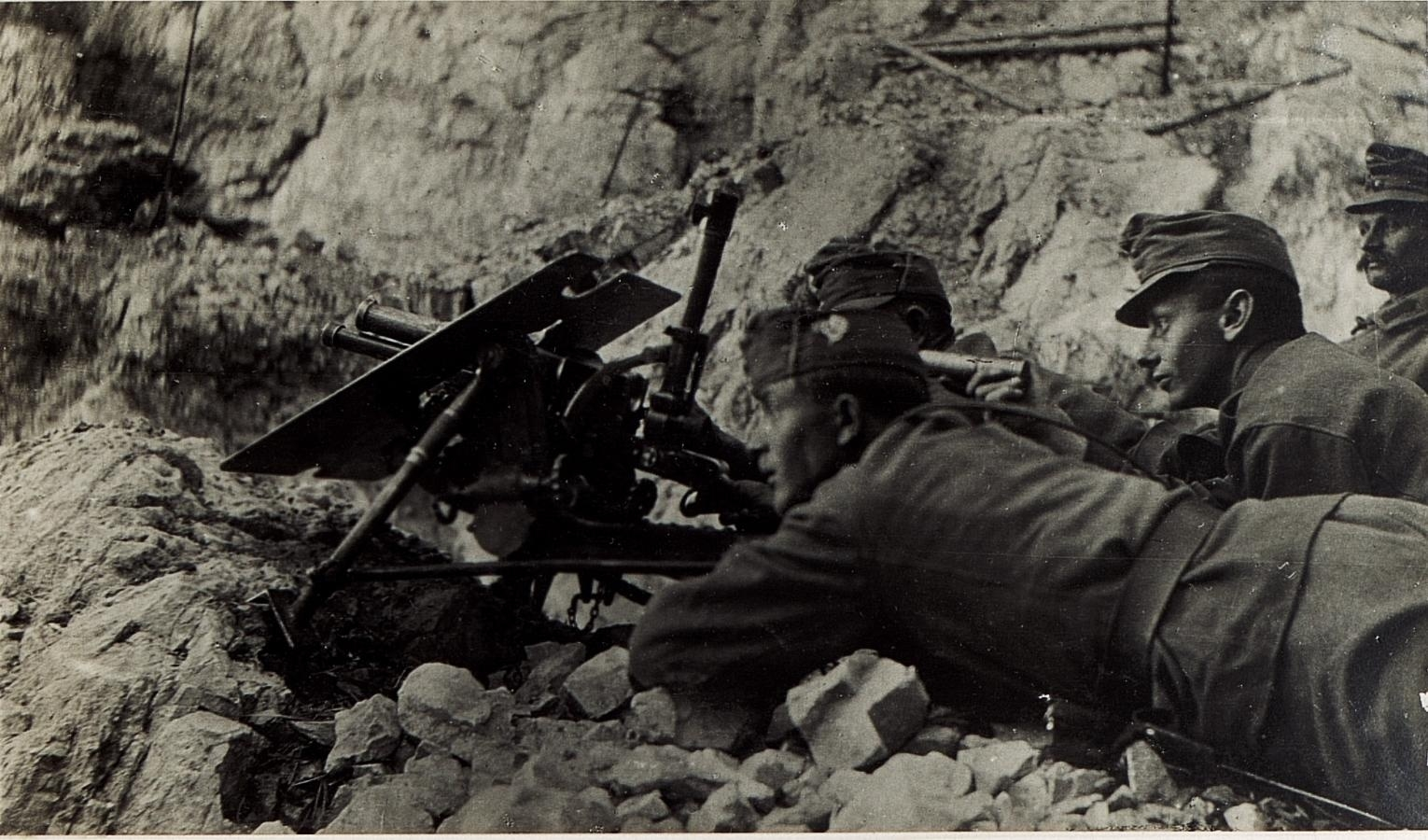
M15 with a gun shield and its trail folded backward on a mountain

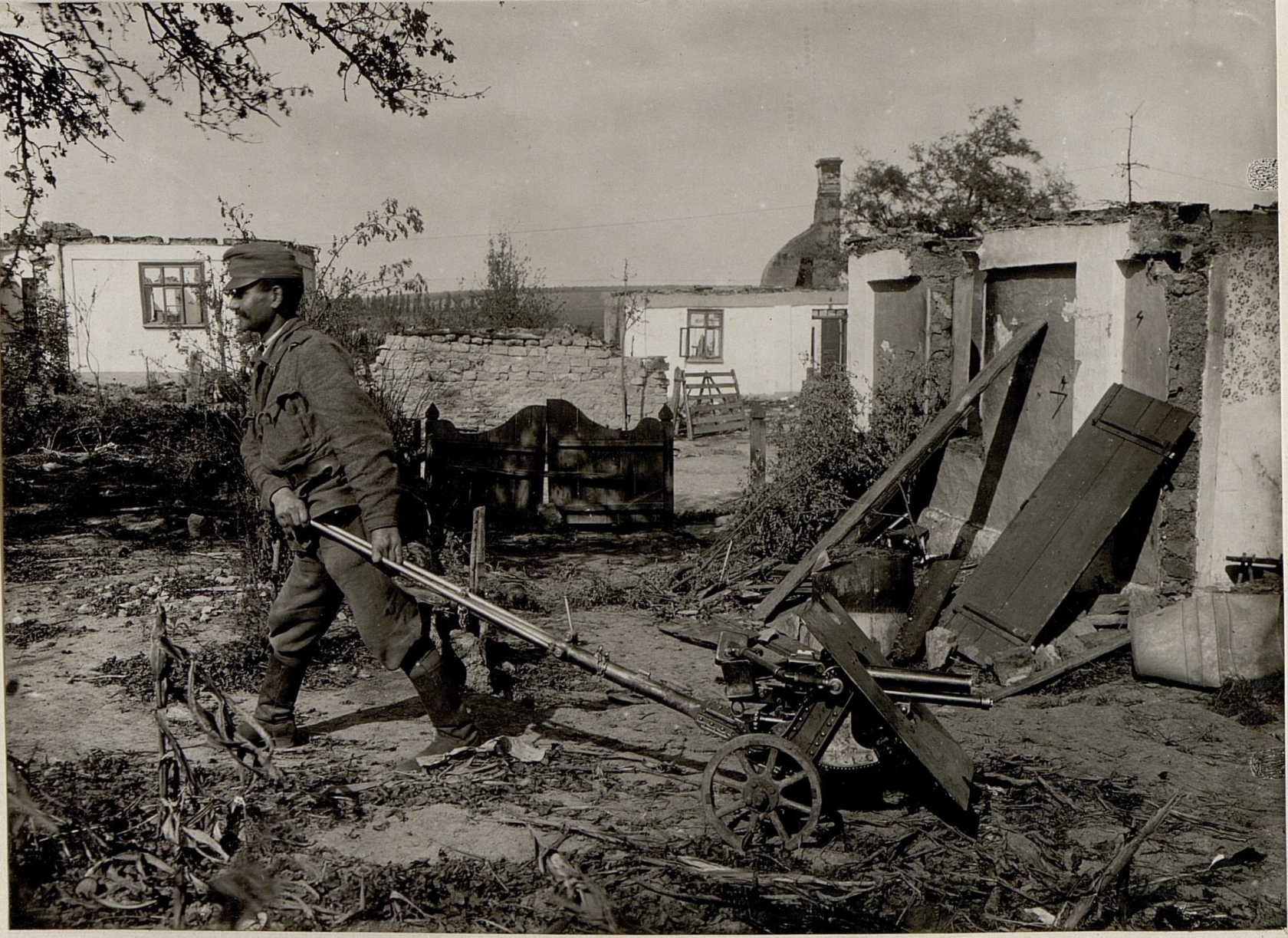
M15 folded in towing position.

== Bibliography ==
- Stefan Pataj: Artyleria lądowa 1872-1970. Warszawa: Wydawnictwo MON, 1975.
- Filippo Cappellano, La Vickers-Terni and the production of artillery in Italy in the First World War, in the Italian Society of Military History, Quaderno 1999, Edizioni Scientifiche Italiane, 2003, pg. 82-91.
