= 37 mm trench gun M1915 =

37-mm trench gun M1915
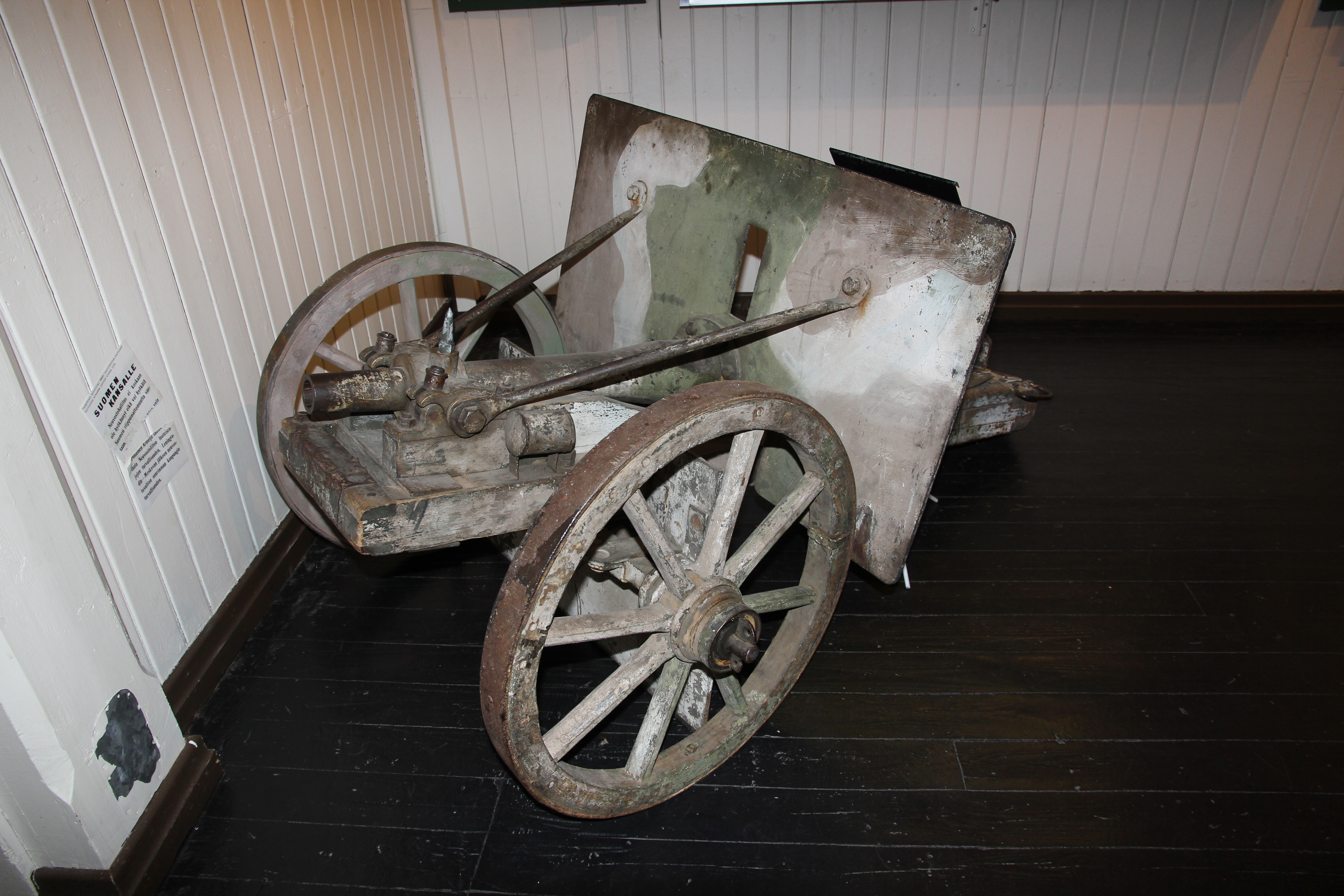
- 37 mm trench gun M1915
- Type: Infantry support gun
- Place of origin: Russian Empire

Service history
- Wars: World War I World War II

Specifications
- Mass: 180.1 kg (397 lbs)
- Length: 1.6 m (5 ft 3 in)
- Barrel length: 70 cm (2 ft 4 in) L/19
- Width: 100 cm (3 ft 3 in)
- Height: 100 cm (3 ft 3 in)
- Shell: Fixed QF 37 x 94 mm R HE, APHE, APHE-T, AP, AP-T, Canister
- Shell weight: .512 kg (1 lb 2 oz)
- Caliber: 37 mm (1.45 in)
- Recoil: none
- Carriage: Box-trail
- Elevation: -5° to +15°
- Traverse: 90°
- Muzzle velocity: 442 m/s (1,450 ft/s)
- Maximum firing range: 3.2 km (2 mi)

37-mm trench gun M1915 (Russian: Траншейная 37-мм пушка обр. 1915 года) was a Russian battalion gun employed in World War I.

With World War I switching into a trench warfare phase late in 1914, a need for a highly mobile artillery system to be used against enemy machine gun emplacements and other strongpoints became apparent. In 1915 colonel M. F. Rosenberg, a member of the Artillery Committee, developed such a weapon. The gun was compact enough to fit into machine gun emplacements. It weighed only about 180 kg and could be dismantled into three pieces - barrel (about 74 kg), carriage (82 kg) and wheels (25 kg), making it easy to move around. To protect the crew from enemy fire, the gun was equipped with a shield 6 or 8 mm thick. The weapon was sufficiently accurate at ranges of up to roughly 1 mile or about 1.6 km.

== Similar Weapons ==
- 3.7 cm Infanteriegeschütz M.15
- 3.7 cm TAK 1918
- Canon d'Infanterie de 37 modèle 1916 TRP
- Type 11 37 mm infantry gun
