= Type 11 37 mm infantry gun =

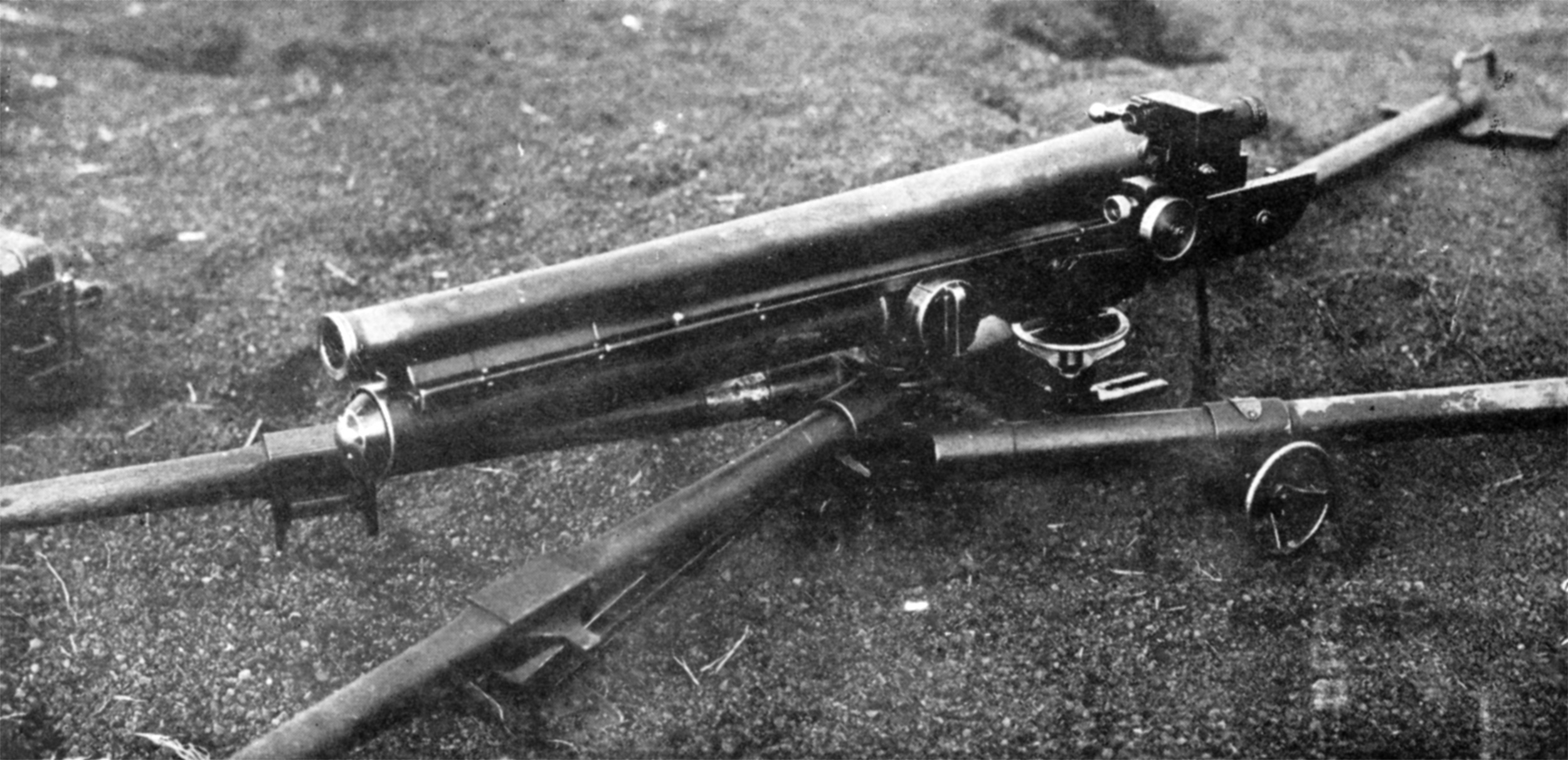
- Type 11 infantry gun
- Type: Infantry support gun
- Place of origin: Empire of Japan

Service history
- In service: 1922–1945
- Used by: Imperial Japanese Army
- Wars: Second Sino-Japanese War; World War II

Production history
- Produced: 1922−1937

Specifications
- Mass: 93.4 kg (206 lb)
- Barrel length: 92.7 cm (3 ft)
- Crew: 4 gunners, 6 support
- Shell: 0.645 kg (1 lb 7 oz)
- Caliber: 37 mm (1.45 in)
- Carriage: tripod
- Elevation: -4.8° to 14°
- Traverse: 33°
- Muzzle velocity: 451 m/s (1,480 ft/s)
- Effective firing range: 2,400 m (2,600 yd)
- Maximum firing range: 5,000 m (5,500 yd)

The Type 11 37 mm infantry support gun (十一年式平射歩兵砲, Jyūiichinen-shiki Heisha hoheihō) was an infantry support gun used by the Imperial Japanese Army in the Second Sino-Japanese War and World War II. The Type 11 designation was given to this gun as it was accepted in the 11th year of Emperor Taishō's reign (1922).

== History and development ==
The Type 11 infantry gun entered service in 1922. It was intended to be used against enemy machine gun positions and light tanks, and in a modified form was used to equip some early Japanese tanks (the Japanese Renault NC27 and some early Type 89 I-Go medium tanks). It had been largely been superseded by the Type 94 37 mm anti-tank gun by beginning of the Pacific War. However it was still used until the end of World War II.

== Design ==
The Type 11 infantry gun was based on the French Canon d'Infanterie de 37 modèle 1916 TRP, for which Japan bought a production license after World War I, and modified it to suit Japanese requirements. It fired from a tubular steel tripod and used a vertically sliding breechblock, that was opened and closed by a lever on the right side of the gun. The gun was fired by pulling sharply on a cord hanging from its rear, which drove a lever into the firing pin, which impacted and initiated the percussion cap in the rear of the shell.

It was intended to be carried into action by its gunners using the rear legs of the gun as carrying poles and lacked wheels entirely, with a pair of removable poles at the front allowing four soldiers to lift the weapon. The rear legs of the weapon were fitted with spades to firmly fix the gun in position.

The gun fired the Type 12 high-explosive shell, which contained 41 grams of explosive, as well as an ineffective anti-tank shell.

== Combat record ==
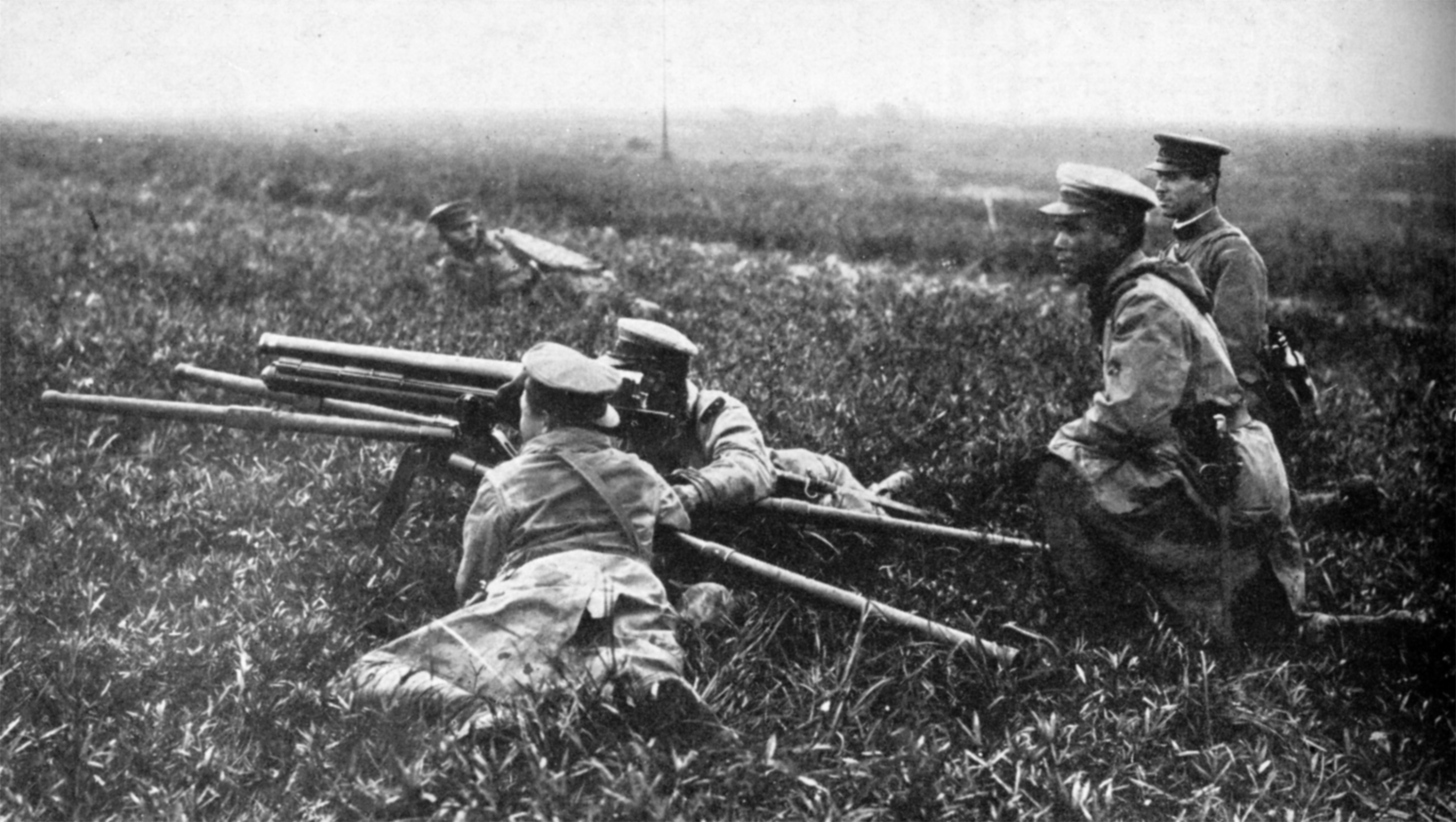
An IJA Type 11 37 mm infantry gun unit. The two main gunners are operating the gun, the first reserve gunner kneels immediately behind them. The squad leader is kneeling off slightly to one side, and a second reserve gunner is lying off to one side.

The Type 11 infantry support guns were typically assigned in groups of four to combat infantry regiments. Each weapon was operated by a squad of 10 soldiers (a squad leader, four gunners (two of whom stood in reserve a little distance from the gun), three troops to carry ammunition and two troops who handled the pack horses used with the gun), and was kept in contact with the regimental headquarters (typically up to 300 meters away) by field telephone or messenger runners.

The gun was effective in the early stages of the Second-Sino-Japanese War for its intended purpose of providing heavy infantry firepower against semi-fortified positions, such as pillboxes, machine gun nests, and lightly armored vehicles. However, its low muzzle velocity, small caliber and low rate of fire rendered it quickly obsolete against Allied forces equipped with tanks, and it was seldom seen outside of reserve units during the Pacific War.

== Similar Weapons ==
- 3.7 cm Infanteriegeschütz M.15
- 37 mm trench gun M1915
- 3.7 cm TAK 1918
- Canon d'Infanterie de 37 modèle 1916 TRP
