= Type 92 battalion gun =

70 mm Type 92 battalion gun
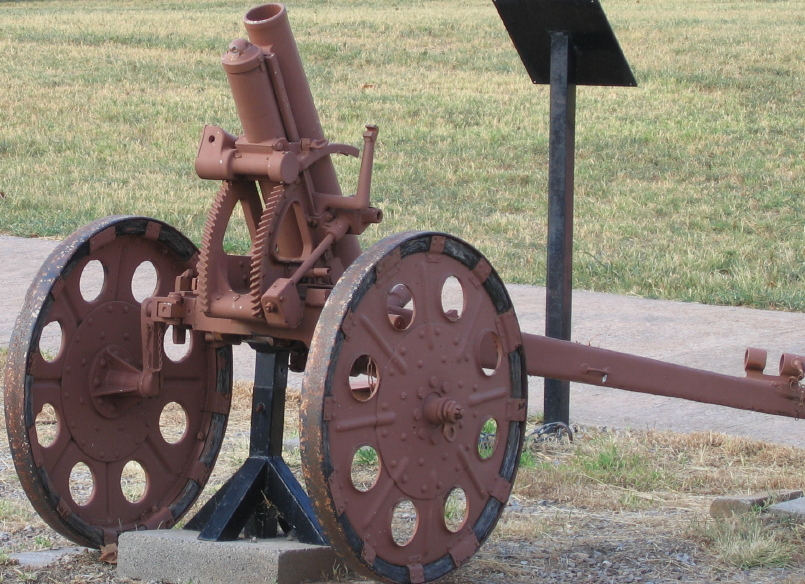
- A Type 92, without shield, at the U.S. Army Field Artillery Museum, Ft. Sill, OK
- Type: Howitzer
- Place of origin: Empire of Japan

Service history
- In service: 1932–1945 (Japanese forces)
- Used by: See Users
- Wars: Second Sino-Japanese War; Soviet-Japanese Border Wars; World War II; Chinese Communist Revolution; First Indochina War; Indonesian National Revolution; Korean War (Limited); Vietnam War

Production history
- Produced: 1932–1945
- No. built: 2,876

Specifications
- Mass: 216 kg (476 lbs)
- Length: 2,006 mm (6 ft 7 in)
- Barrel length: 723 mm (2 ft 4 in)
- Width: 914 mm (3 ft)
- Height: 775 mm (2 ft 7 in)
- Crew: 5
- Shell: separate-loading
- Caliber: 70mm (2.75 in)
- Breech: interrupted thread, drop breechblock
- Recoil: Hydro-spring
- Carriage: split-trail
- Elevation: -4° to +70°
- Traverse: 45°
- Rate of fire: 10 rpm
- Muzzle velocity: 198 m/s (650 ft/s)
- Effective firing range: 2,785 m (3,060 yards)

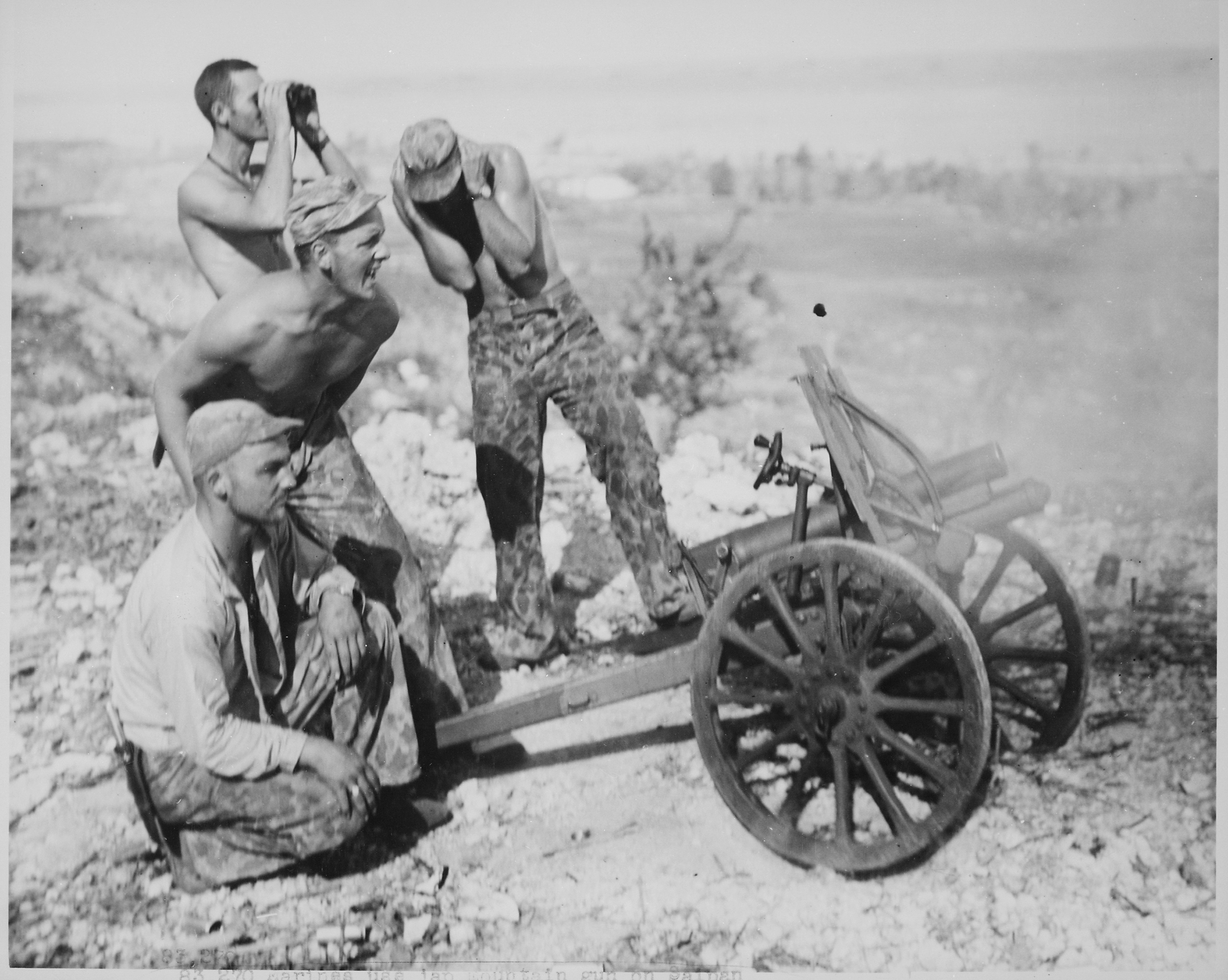
Type 92 battalion gun captured and used by USMC on Saipan

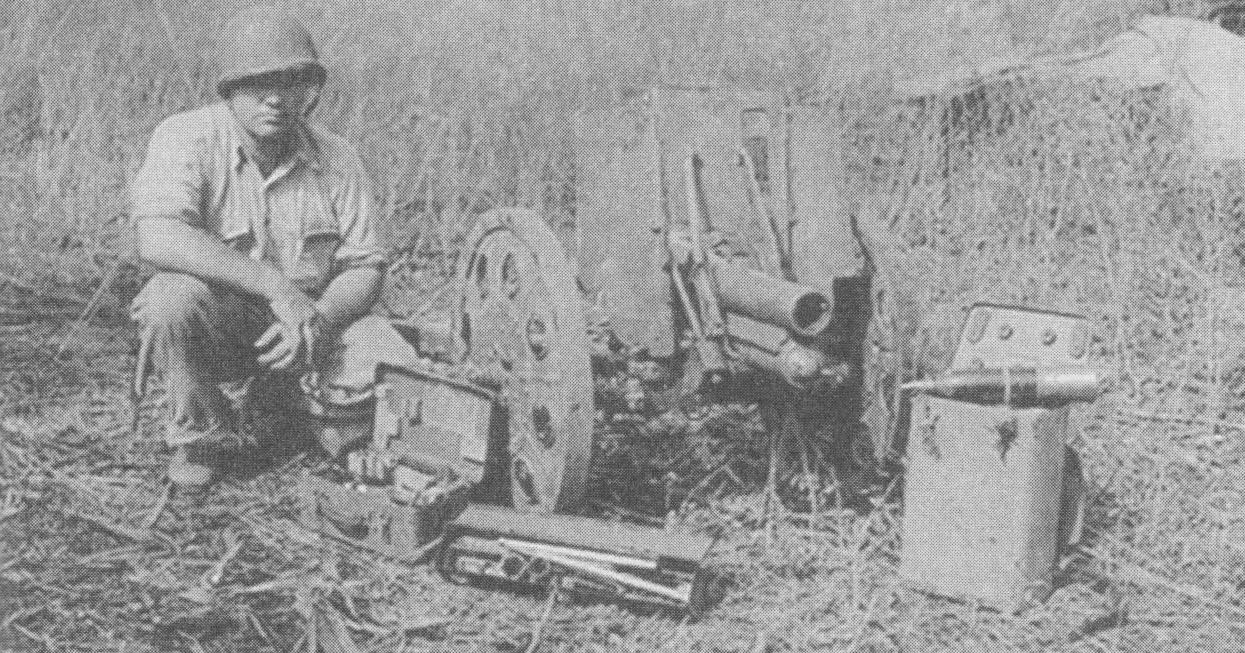
Type 92 battalion gun captured on Guadalcanal

The Type 92 battalion gun (九二式歩兵砲, Kyūni-shiki Hoheihō) was a 70mm (2.75 in) light howitzer used by the Imperial Japanese Army during the Second Sino-Japanese War and World War II. Type 92 could be used in both direct and indirect fire. Despite its odd appearance, the Type 92 was well-liked by the IJA. The Type 92 designation was for the year the gun was accepted, 2592 in the Japanese imperial year calendar, or 1932 in the Gregorian calendar. Each infantry battalion included two Type 92 guns; therefore, the Type 92 was referred to as "battalion artillery" (大隊砲, Daitaihō).

== History and development ==
The Type 92 battalion gun was designed in response to issues with the Type 11 37 mm infantry gun and the Type 11 70 mm infantry mortar. Both lacked sufficient firepower and range, and infantry divisions did not like the fact that they had to carry two different types of weapons with different ammunition into combat. As a result, the army technical bureau developed a design which could be used either at low angle direct fire to take out fortified positions, machine gun nests and light armor, but also could be used at high angle indirect support fire. The caliber of the new weapon was increased to 70 mm to address the issue of inadequate firepower. The new design was available to front line divisions by 1932.

== Design ==
Somewhat unusual in appearance, the Type 92 battalion gun had a short gun barrel with a split trail carriage. The barrel could be configured from a horizontal to near vertical position with a hand-crank. It had an interrupted thread type, drop breechblock mechanism. Lightweight and maneuverable, it was designed to be pulled by a single horse, although in practice teams of three horses were usually assigned. Its relativity small size and weight also allowed it to be manhandled by its crew for short distances. The wheels were originally wooden, but were changed to steel after troops complained that the noise from the squeaky wooden wheels was a threat.

A 70mm hollow-charge anti-tank round was introduced in 1943 which could penetrate up to 90mm of armor. The Type 92 battalion guns curved trajectory and short barrel meant that tanks had to be engaged at relatively close-range. U.S. tests in the Philippines with captured 70 mm HEAT rounds proved capable of puncturing the turret of a M4A3 Sherman tank and was rated at an excess of 70 mm of armor penetration.

== Combat record ==
The Type 92 battalion gun was first used in combat during the Manchurian Incident, and was subsequently in heavy use throughout the invasion of Manchuria, the Battle of Nomonhan and subsequent Second Sino-Japanese War. It later accompanied units assigned to the Pacific front and was used with considerable effectiveness against Allied forces throughout the South Seas Mandate and in Southeast Asia.

During the Indonesian National Revolution, Indonesian rebels used an estimated 50 Type 92 guns, but their use decreased as the war was going on. Significant quantities of Type 92 guns were captured by Nationalist and Communist forces in China following the cessation of hostilities in 1945. The People's Liberation Army, which also manufactured ammunition for them, kept them in service in the 1950s. Type 92s were still used, although more rarely than other guns, by the People's Liberation Armed Forces of South Vietnam during the Vietnam War.

== Users ==
- Imperial Japanese Army
- People's Liberation Army (captured)
- National Revolutionary Army (captured)
- Indonesia
- Liberation Army of South Vietnam
- Vietnam

== Ammunition ==
Type	Model	Weight	Filler
HE	Type 92	4.48 kg (9.88 lb)	0.59 kg (1.30 lb) TNT
HEAT	Type 37 Hollow Charge	2.8 kg (6.2 lb)	0.99 kg (2.18 lb) TNT/RDX mix
Illumination	Type 95 Illuminating Projectile	4.2 kg (9.3 lb)	Unknown (thought to be magnesium, aluminum, barium nitrate mix). 90,000 candlepower for 20 seconds

== Performance ==
Type	Armor penetration 90°	Armor penetration 60°
Type 37 Hollow Charge	100mm	80mm

== Surviving examples ==
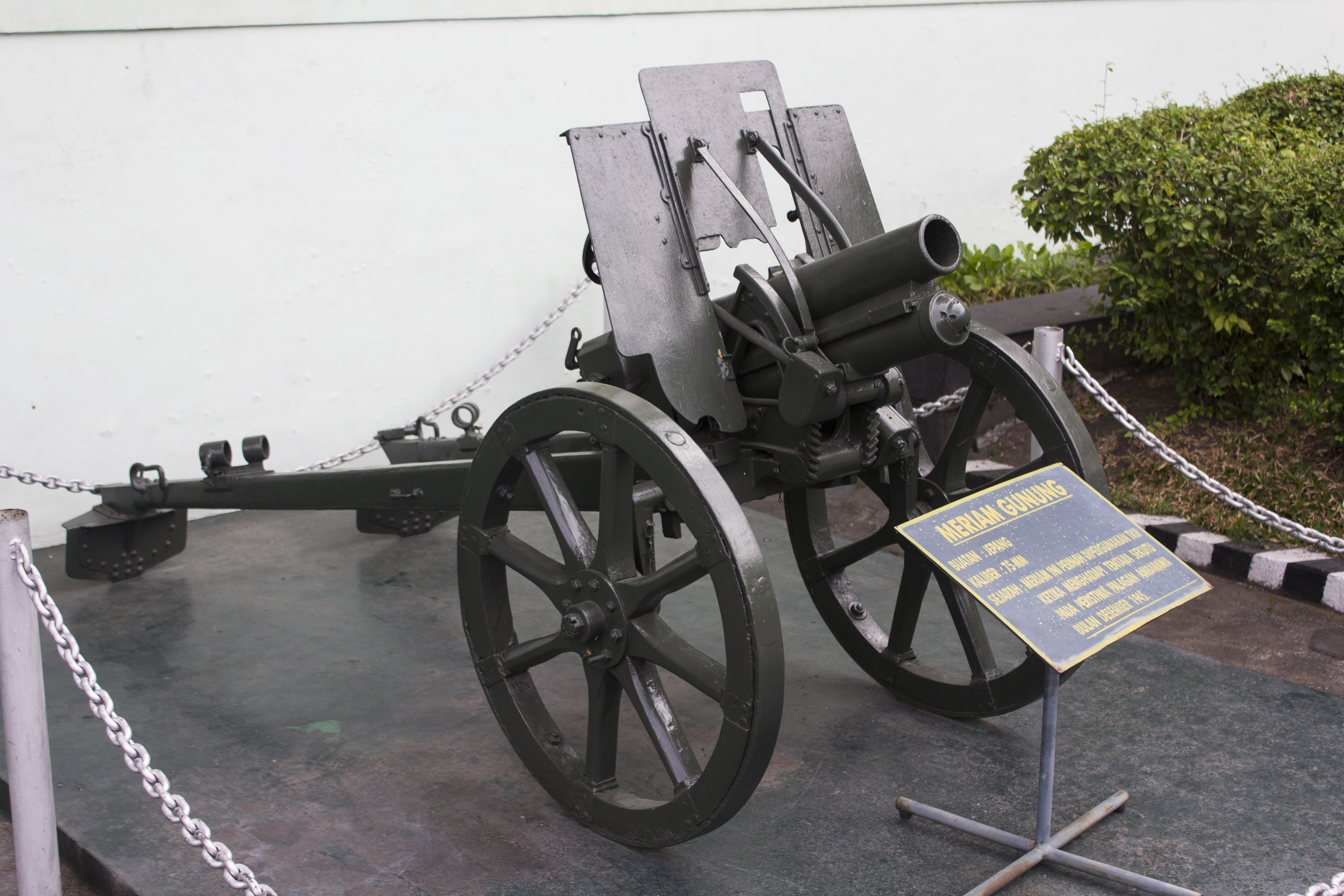
Type 92 gun at Dharma Wiratama Museum in Yogyakarta, Indonesia

Two guns are preserved and on display in a small park on Main Street in Lakeport, California. One gun (on the southern side), with serial number 399, has unperforated sheet-metal wheels, while the wheels of the other gun (to the north) appear to have been restored with new material.

Two guns are at the Marine Recruiting Depot Museum in San Diego, California, put on display outdoors.

Another is on display in front of VFW Post 7589 in Manassas, VA.

One gun is on display at the Redcliffe branch of the RSL in Queensland, Australia, reliably reported as coming from WWII operations on the Kokoda Trail against the Japanese in Papua New Guinea. One other example is located at Army Museum Bandiana, Victoria as part of their artillery display.

A Type 92, without its shield, is displayed at the U.S. Army Field Artillery Museum at Fort Sill, Oklahoma. Its picture is attached here.

One Type 92, painted green, was formerly on display at Reflections at Bukit Chandu, a Singapore war museum dedicated to the Battle of Pasir Panjang during the Japanese invasion of the island in 1942. Following a recent renovation, the gun was removed and its current location is unknown.

A Type 92 gun is on display at the lobby entrance of Dharma Wiratama Museum, an Indonesian Army museum at Yogyakarta, Indonesia. The museum plaque mentioned that the gun was used during the Battle of Ambarawa in December 1945.

== Gallery ==
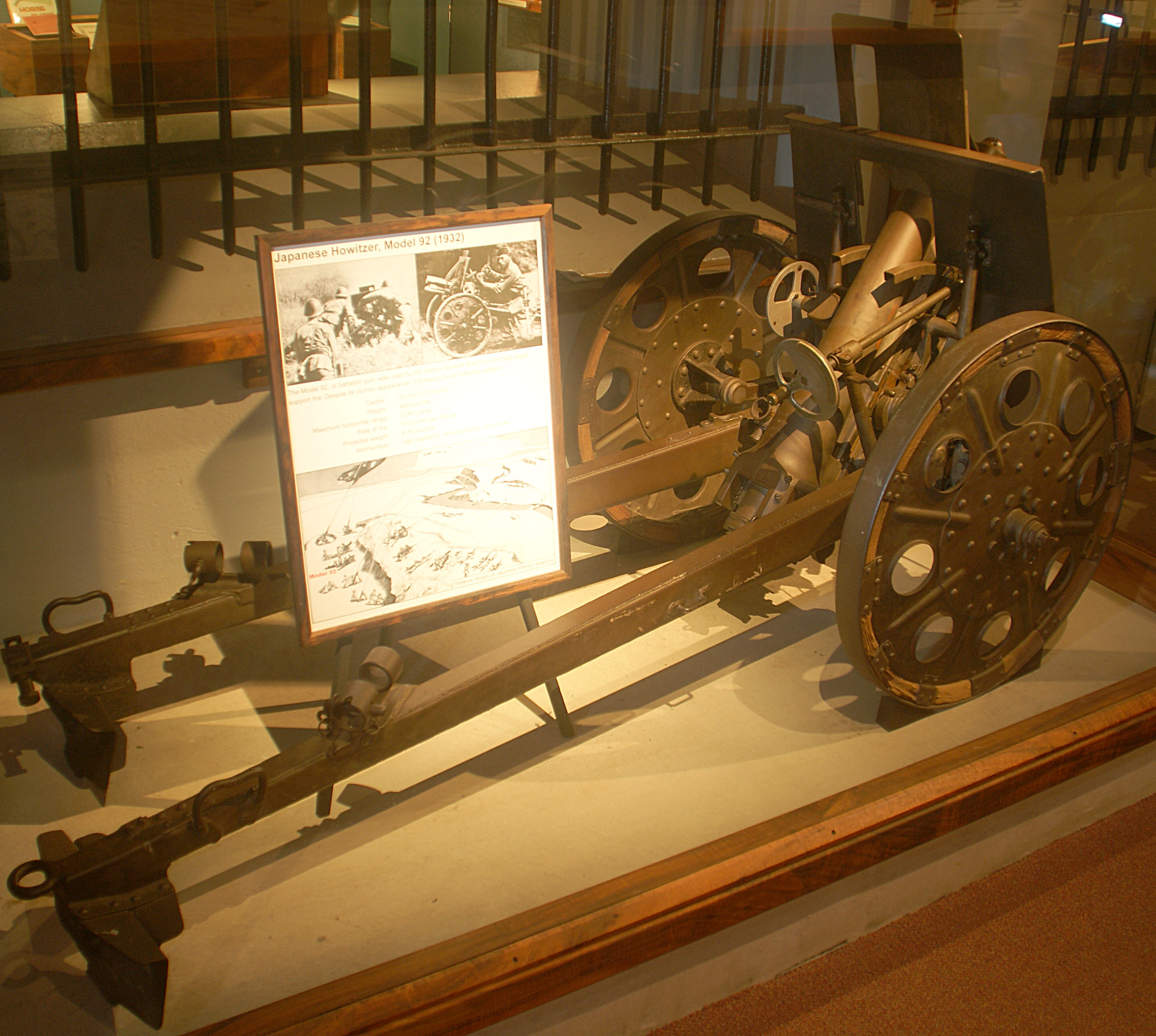
1932 model, Battery Randolf Museum, Hawaii

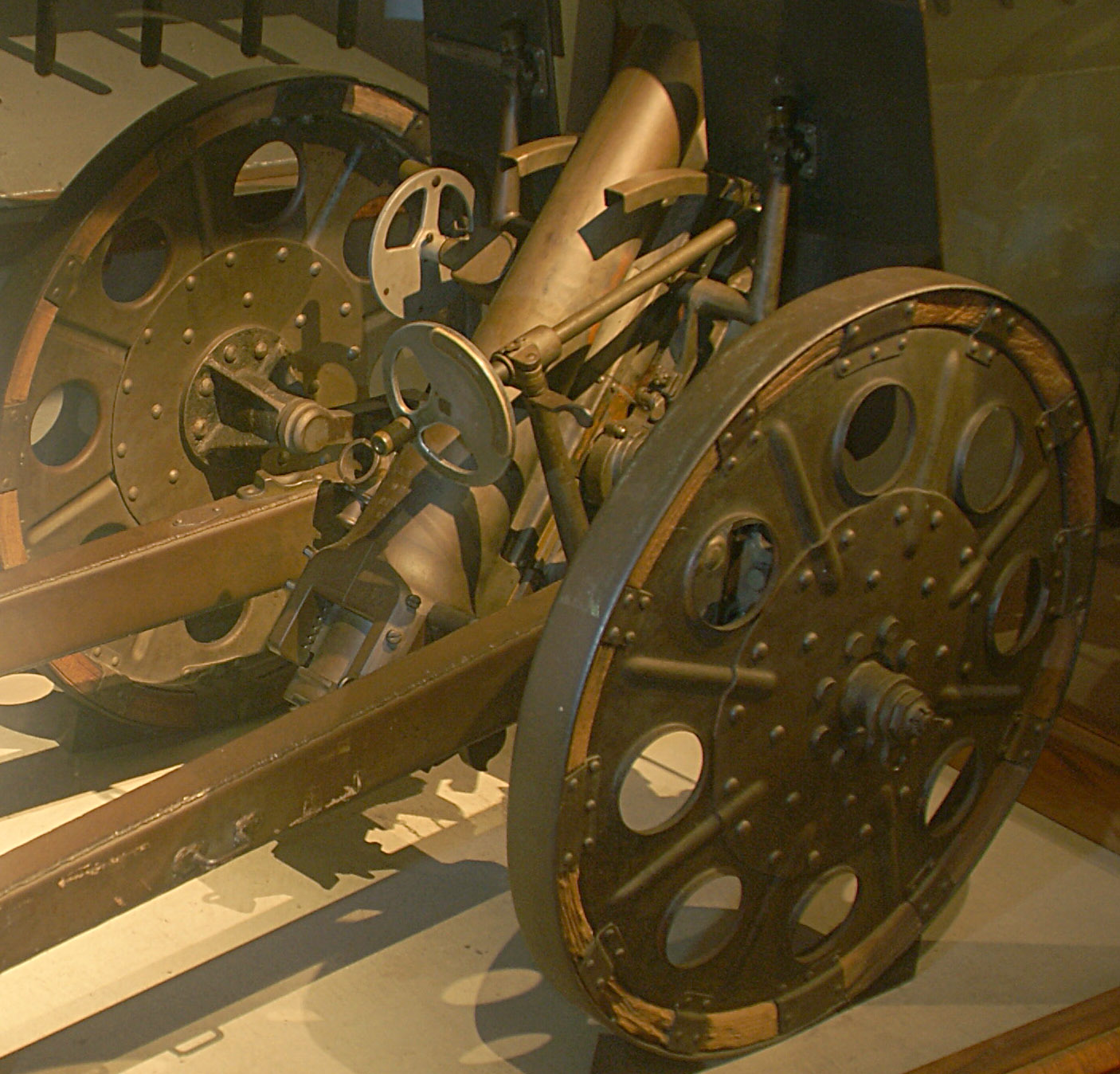
closeup of controls

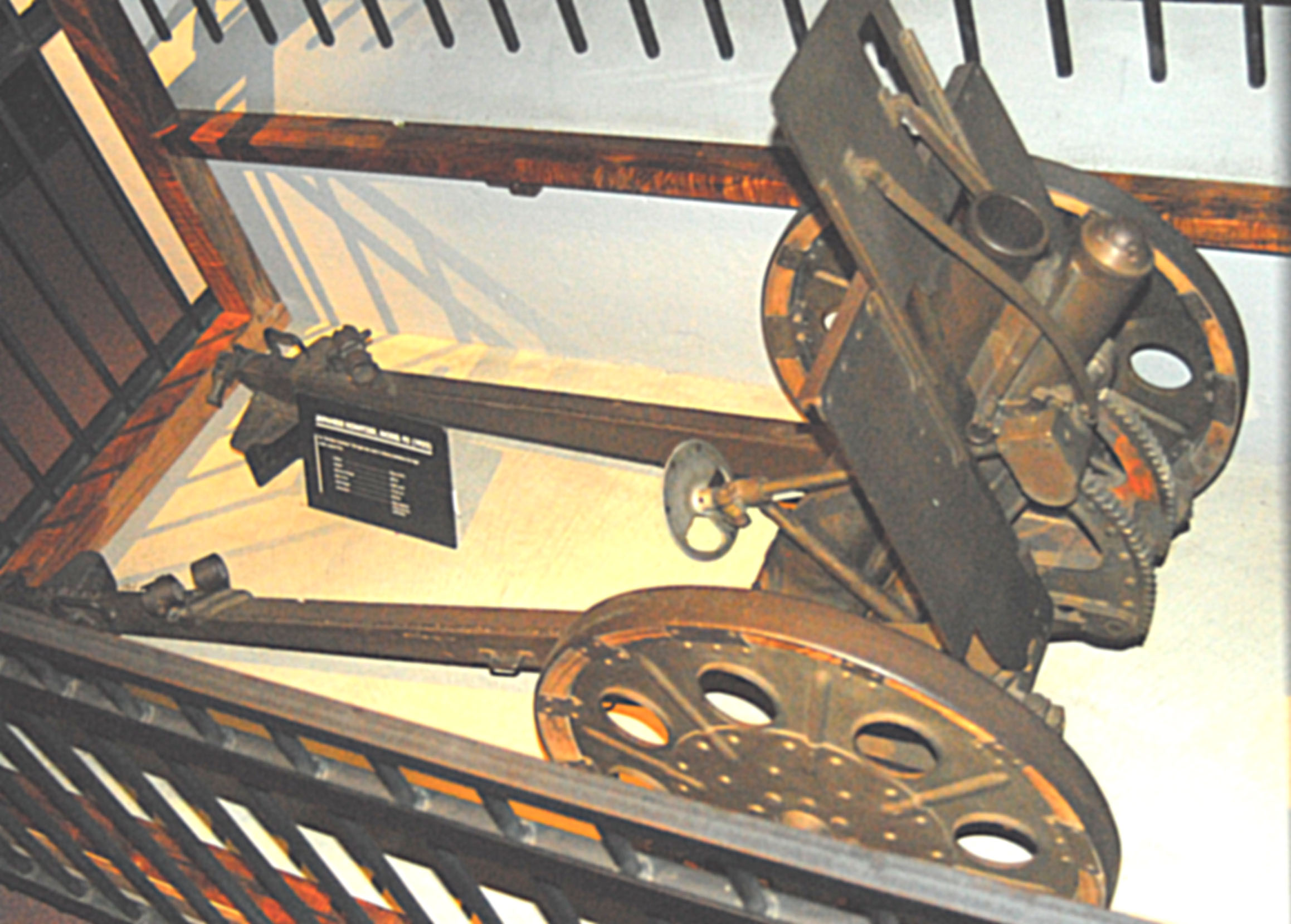
Model 92 Howitzer side view

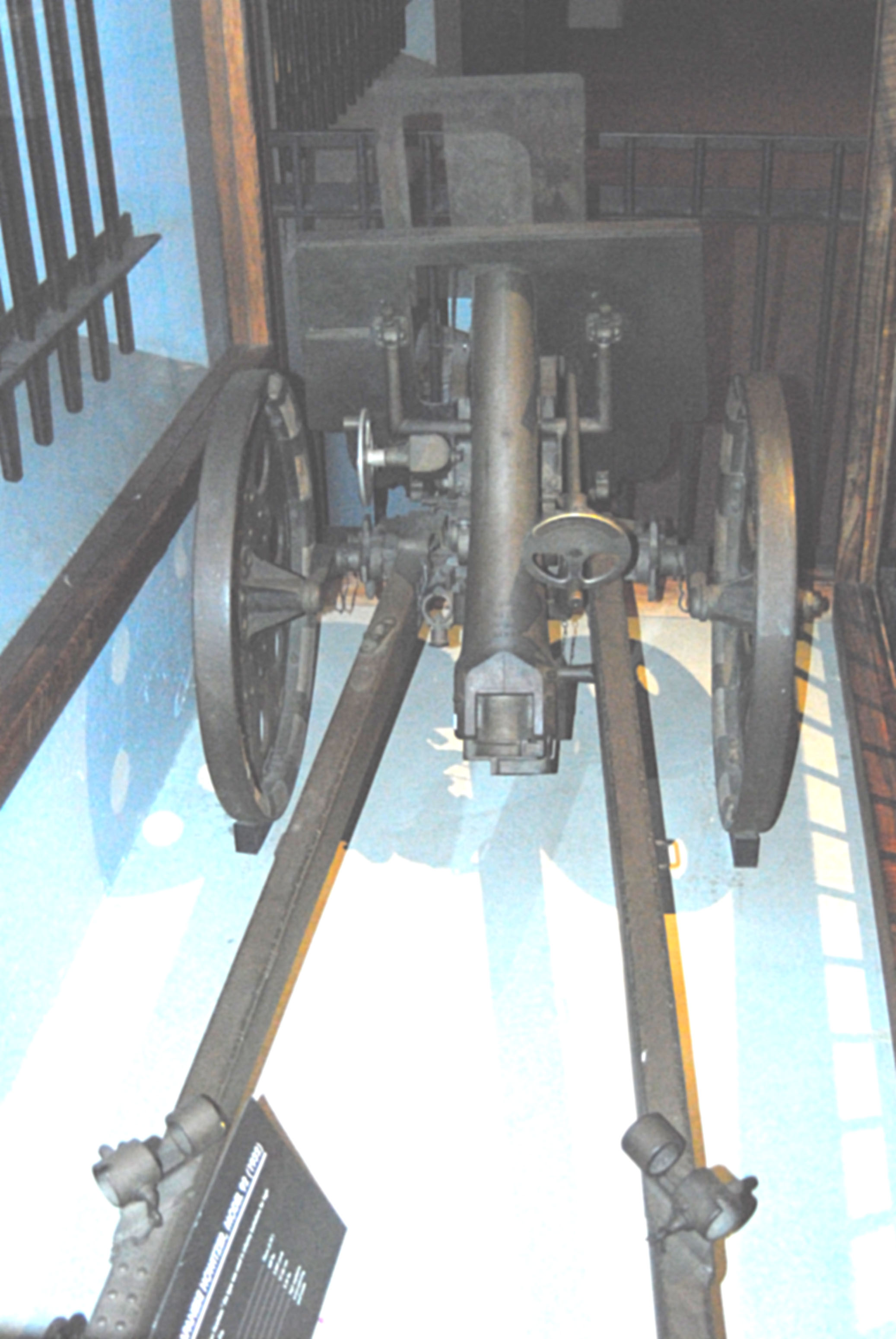
Model 92 Howitzer rear view

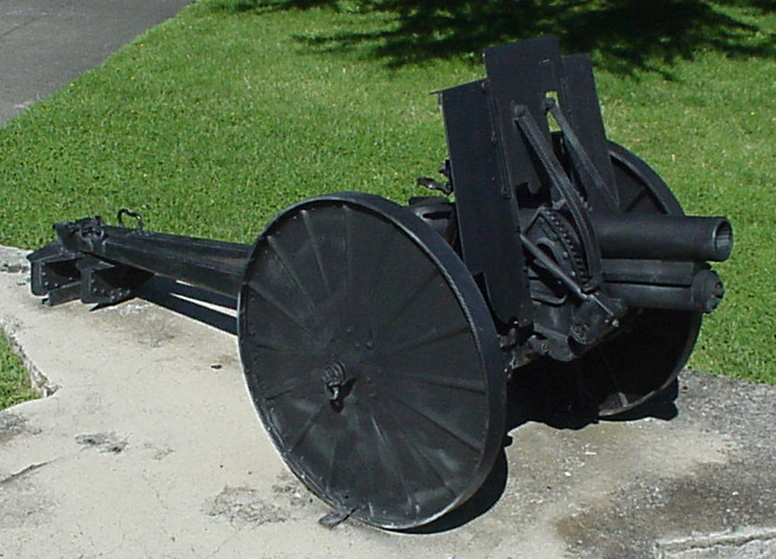
Gun Number 399 preserved in Lakeport, California

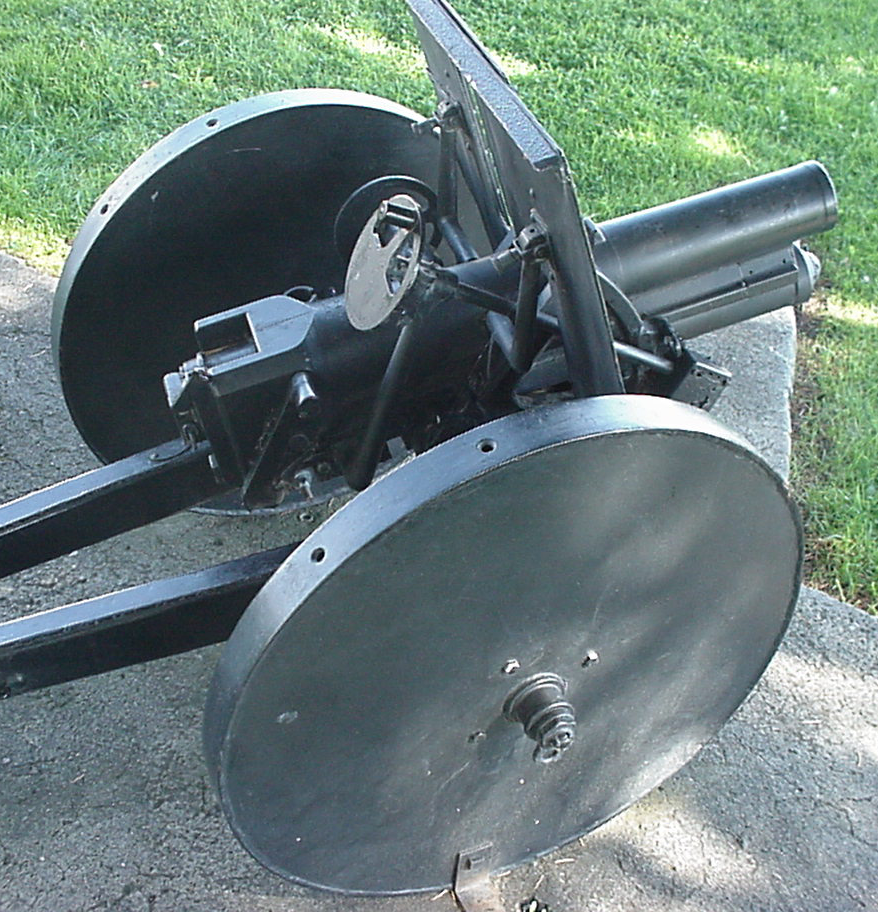
Gun number 30300 preserved at Lakeport, California

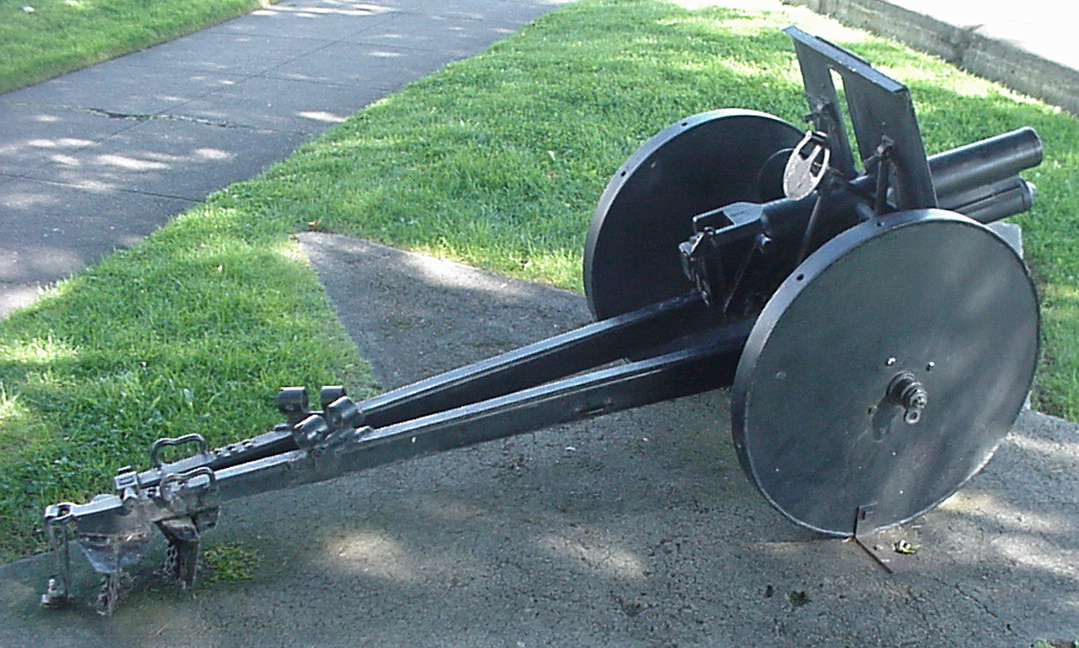
Spades together for transport

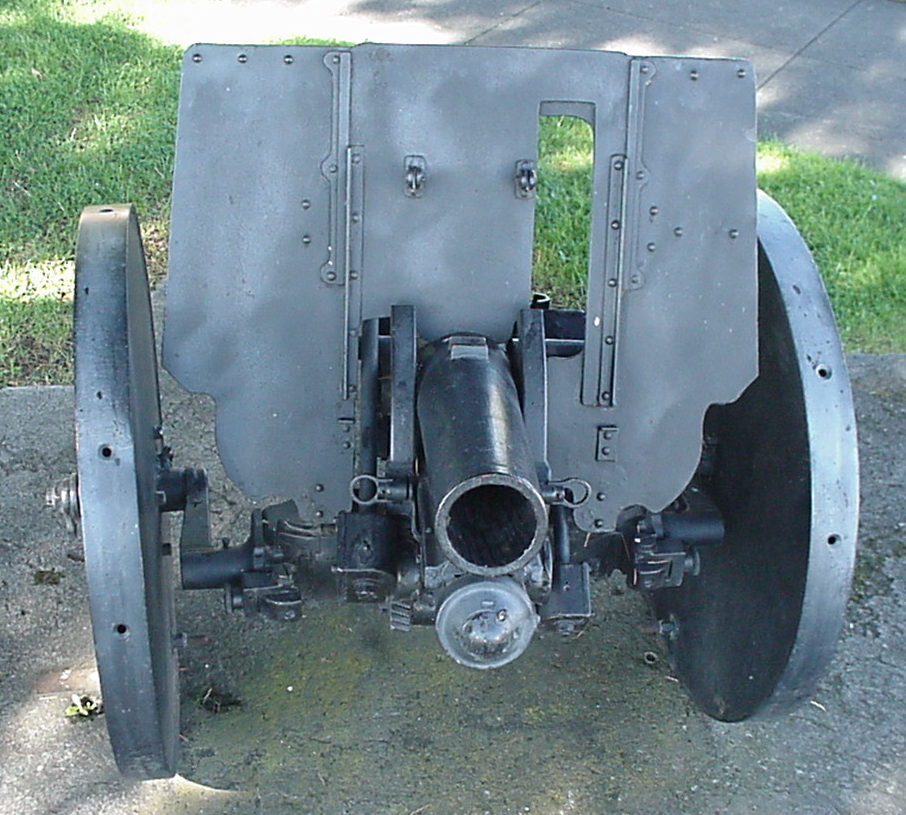
Model 92 Howitzer front view

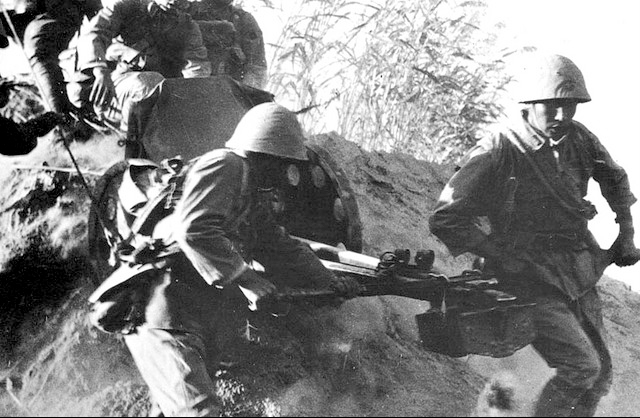
A Type 92 battalion gun is drawn by its crew to a new firing position. Bataan, Philippines 1942

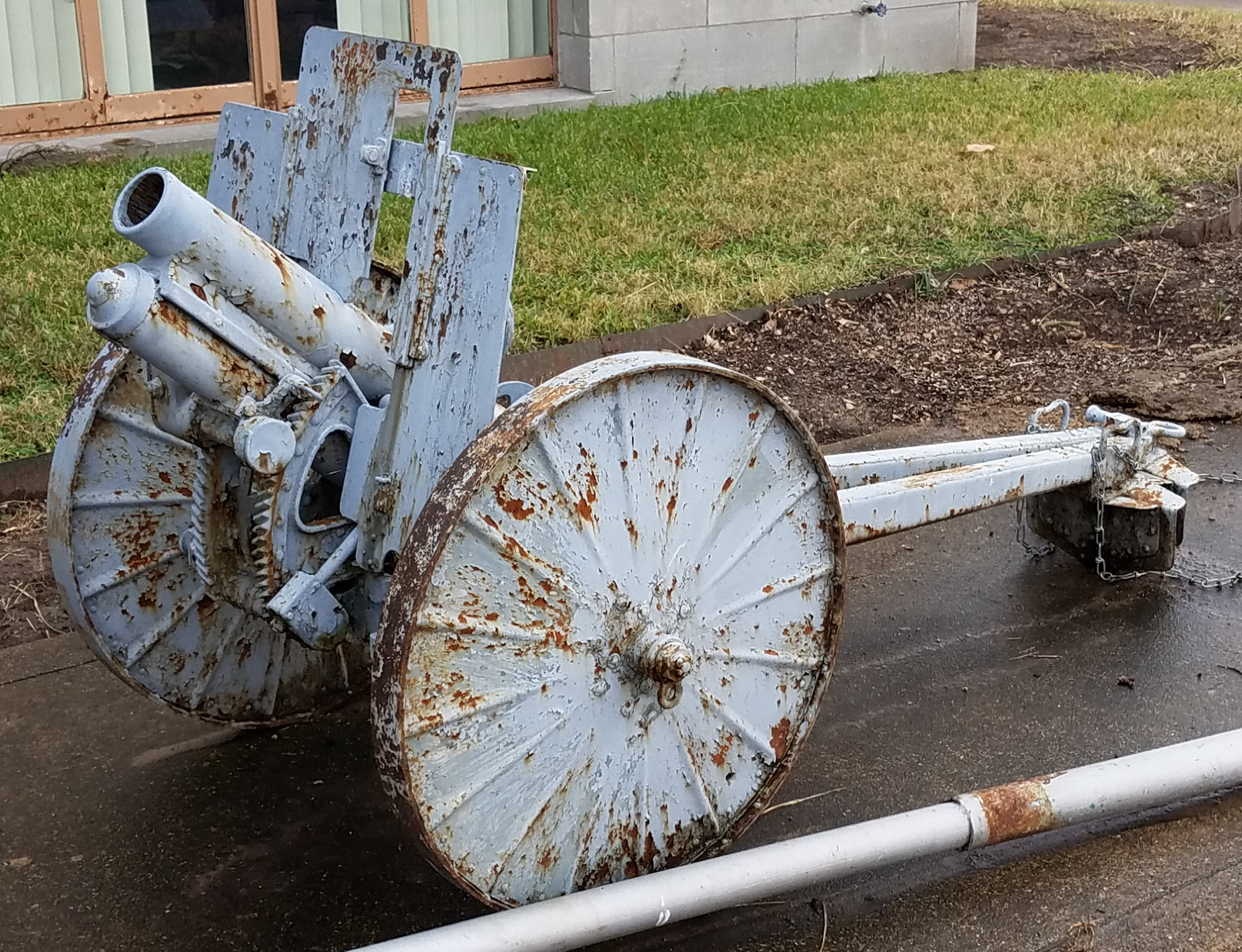
Gun Number 400 displayed Greenville, Hunt County, Texas
