= 3.7 cm TAK 1918 =

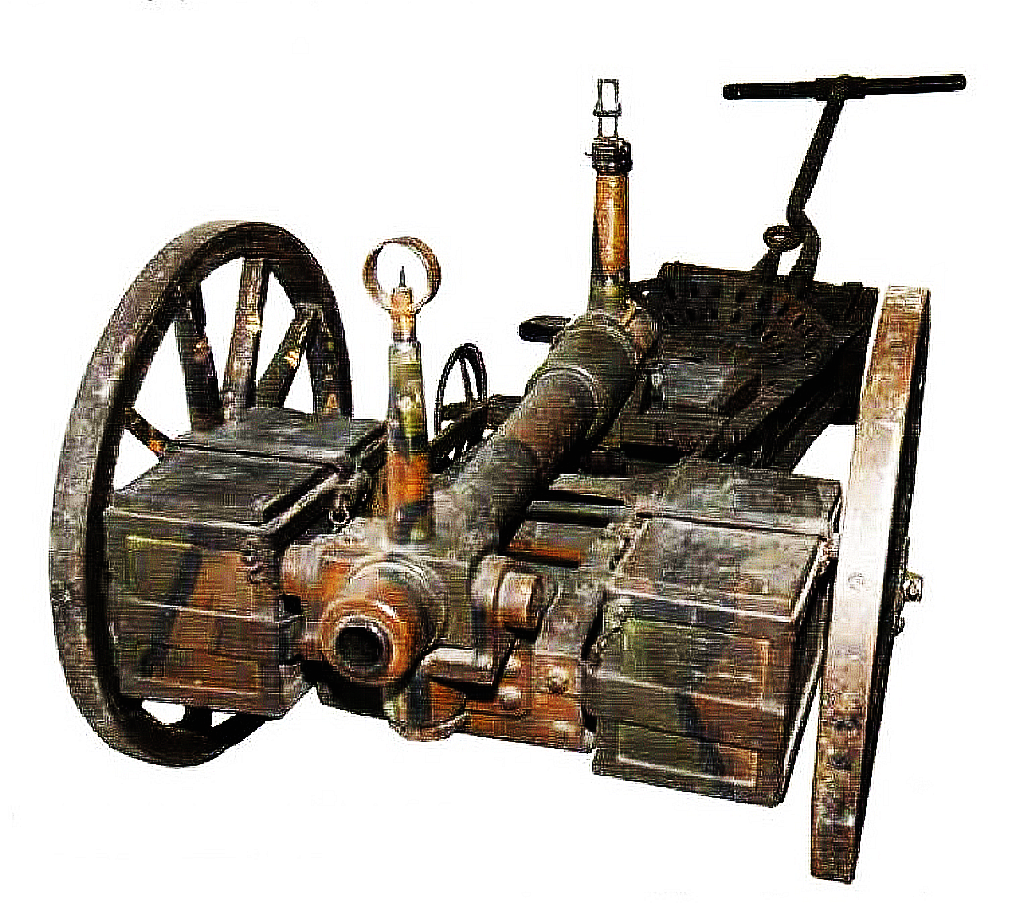
- Type: Anti-tank gun
- Place of origin: German Empire

Service history
- Used by: German Empire
- Wars: World War I

Production history
- Designer: Rheinmetall
- Designed: 1918
- Manufacturer: Rheinmetall
- Produced: 1918
- No. built: ~600

Specifications
- Mass: 463 kg (1,020 lb) travel 175 kg (386 lb) combat
- Length: 2.17 m (7 ft 1 in)
- Barrel length: 780 mm (2 ft 7 in) L/21
- Width: 730 mm (2 ft 5 in)
- Height: 515 mm (1 ft 8 in)
- Crew: 7
- Shell: Fixed 37x94mm R 460 g (1 lb)
- Action: Manual
- Recoil: None
- Carriage: Box trail
- Elevation: -6° to +9°
- Traverse: 21°
- Muzzle velocity: 435 m/s (1,427 ft/s)
- Effective firing range: 300 m (328 yd)
- Maximum firing range: 2,621 m (2,866 yd)

The 3.7 cm Tankabwehrkanone 1918 in starrer Räderlafette or 3.7 cm TAK 1918, was an anti-tank gun built by Rheinmetall for the Imperial German Army near the end of the First World War. This was the world's first cannon that was purpose-designed for the role of an anti-tank gun.

== History ==
At first, the German High Command was indifferent to the idea of developing specialized anti-tank weapons. The problem of dealing with tanks was considered to be a tactical problem and not a technical problem. Riflemen and machine gunners were given armor-piercing k bullets, while artillery units were trained to engage the tanks with direct fire. However, once allied tanks began to be encountered in greater numbers and employed with better tactical coordination an emergency program was launched to develop weapons and tactics to counter the threat from tanks.

The first response to the tank threat was an anti-tank rifle based on the standard Mauser bolt-action rifle of the time, the Gewehr 98. The new Mauser 1918 Tankgewehr was a scaled up version of the Gewehr 98 firing a 13.25 × 92 mm SR armor-piercing round. Although adequate to pierce the armor of the time this gun proved unpopular due to its weight of 18.5 kg (40 lb 13 oz) and strong recoil. The second gun was the Maschinengewehr 18 Tank und Flieger or MG 18 TuF, which was a dual-purpose anti-tank and anti-aircraft heavy machine gun based on the MG 08 and firing the same 13.25 mm round as the T-Gewehr. However, the MG 18 TuF was expensive, heavy, complex and never reached service.

In July 1918, the OHL asked both Krupp and Rheinmetall to submit designs for a competition for a new anti-tank weapon with greater range and better penetration than previous weapons. Both companies presented a number of prototypes for the competition and after tests, during August 1918 at the Kummersdorf Proving Grounds, the Rheinmetall design was declared the winner. The Rheinmetall design was considered mobile, stable and accurate enough to be useful in combat.

== Description ==
The 3.7 cm TAK 1918 was not a rifle or machine gun but instead was a small artillery piece. The barrel was rigidly mounted with no recoil mechanism or muzzle brake on a box trail carriage with two wooden-spoked wheels. The barrel came from the earlier Hotchkiss 5-barrel rotary cannon and the carriage was based on the 7.58 cm leichte Minenwerfer carriage. At the front of the carriage was one large storage box on each side of the gun barrel which could carry 24 rounds of ammunition, while above the storage boxes the barrel had elevated front and rear ring sights. A hand wheel was provided for traverse and double screws were provided for elevation. Towards the rear of the carriage there was a metal seat for the gunner and at the end, there was a recoil spade and towing bar. For transport, the gun could be attached to the minenwerfer's limber and towed by a horse or it could be pulled by 4 soldiers using a harness. The wheels were detachable, so the gun could be dug in and its profile lowered. The gun fired a 465 g (1 lb) armor-piercing round that was capable of penetrating 15 mm (0.59 in) of face-hardened armor at 500 m (550 yd). A high explosive anti-personnel round was also developed to deal with targets such as machine gun nests.

== Deployment ==
The 3.7 cm TAK 1918 was to be deployed by Minenwerfer Battalions, with each receiving 32 guns. Training was to be conducted by instructors of the Infanteriegeschützbatterien (Infantry Gun Batteries) who would teach the new gunners anti-tank tactics. Each gun would have a seven-member crew consisting of a gunner, a loader, a commander, and four assistants who would provide covering fire and protection from infantry attacks. Two guns would form a team under the command of a four-member team consisting of a commander, a second in command, and two dispatch runners. The two guns would then be deployed to provide overlapping fields of fire and mutual assistance. An initial order for 300 guns was placed and this was soon raised to 1,020 guns. At the end of the war, approximately 600 guns had been delivered.

The Bundeswehr Museum of German Defense Technology in Koblenz has one of this specimen in its collection.

== Similar Weapons ==
- 3.7 cm Infanteriegeschütz M.15
- 37 mm trench gun M1915
- Canon d'Infanterie de 37 modèle 1916 TRP
- Type 11 37 mm infantry gun
