= Canon d'Infanterie de 37 modèle 1916 TRP =

French infantry support gun

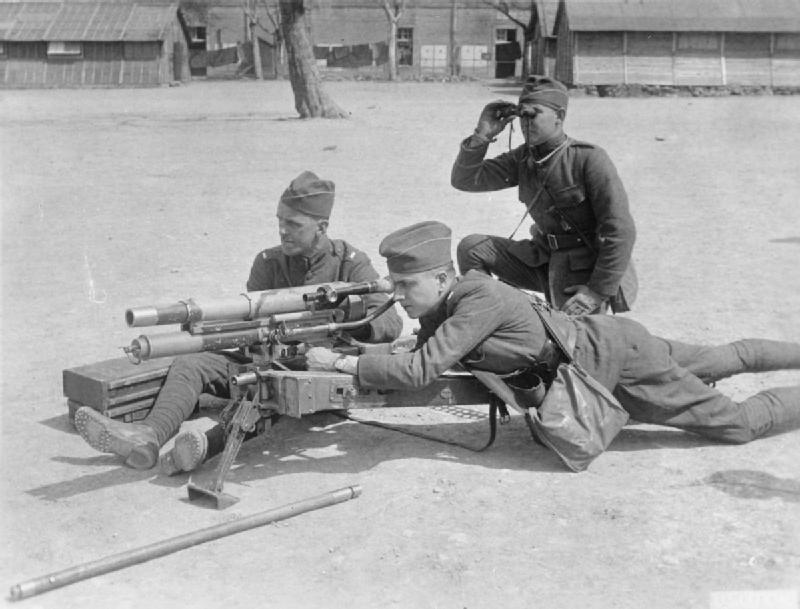
- American troops train with a 37 mm Infantry gun, May 1918
- Type: Infantry support gun Aircraft artillery
- Place of origin: France

Service history
- Used by: France; United States; Commonwealth of the Philippines; Italy; Poland; North Vietnam
- Wars: World War I World War II; First Indochina War

Production history
- Designer: Atelier de Construction de Puteaux
- Produced: 1916

Specifications
- Mass: Combat: 108 kg (238 lbs); Travel: 160.5 kg (354 lbs)
- Barrel length: 74 cm (2 ft 5 in)
- Shell: 37 x 94mm .R
- Caliber: 37mm (1.45 in)
- Elevation: -8° to 17°
- Traverse: 35°
- Rate of fire: Sustained: 25 rpm
- Muzzle velocity: 367 m/s (1,200 ft/s)
- Effective firing range: 1,500 m (1,600 yd)
- Maximum firing range: 2,400 m (2,600 yd)

The Canon d'Infanterie de 37 modèle 1916 TRP (37mm mle.1916) was a French infantry support gun, first used during World War I. TRP stands for tir rapide, Puteaux ("fast-firing", designed by the Puteaux arsenal). The tactical purpose of this gun was the destruction of machine gun nests.

It was also used on aircraft such as the Beardmore W.B.V and the Salmson-Moineau. Fighter ace René Fonck was one pilot known to have used the SPAD S.XII, which was designed around a variant of the 37mm Puteaux gun firing though the propeller spinner.

== Description ==
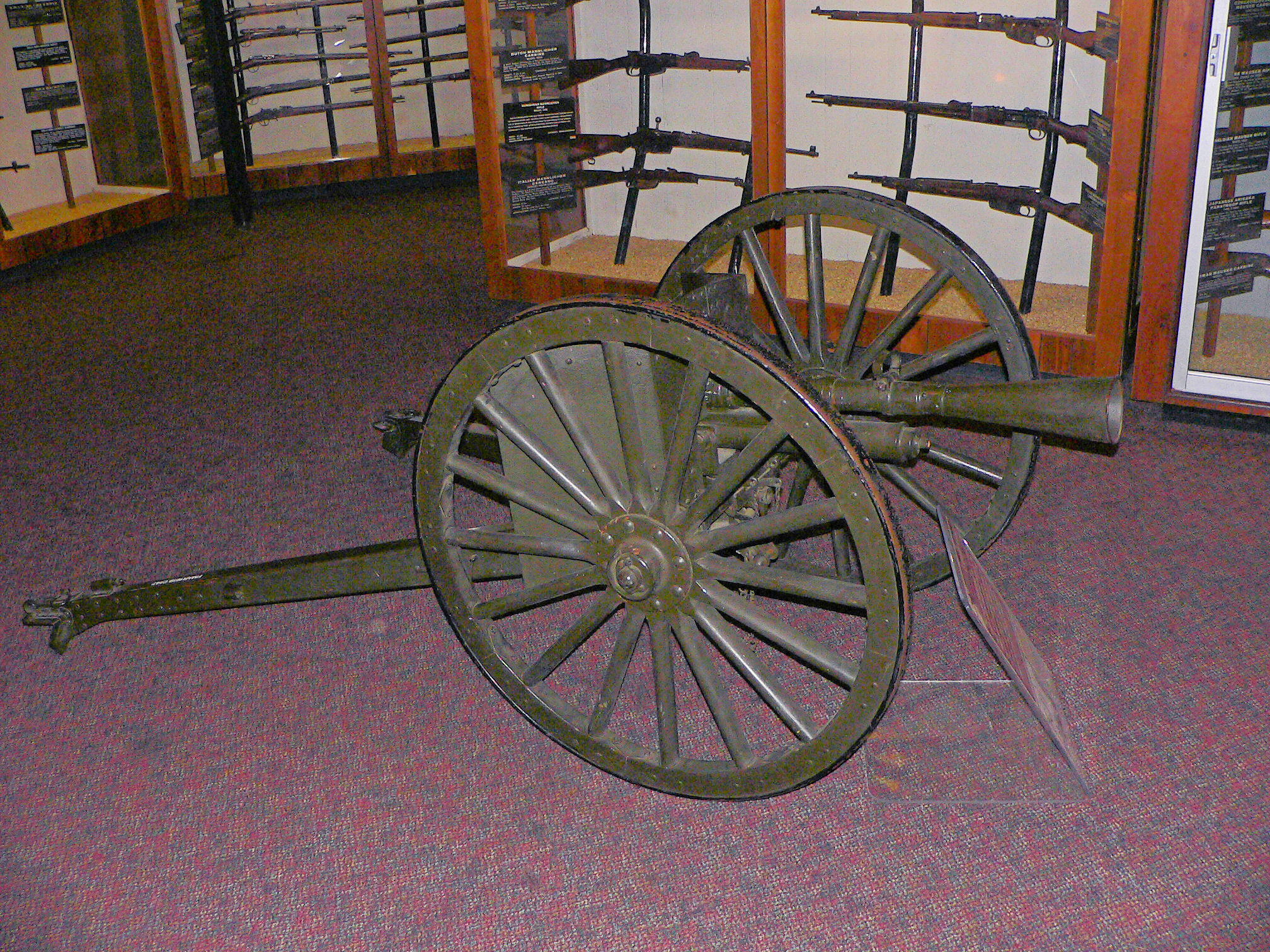
A gun fitted with a gun shield, Flash suppressor and wheels, displayed at the United States Army Ordnance Museum, 2007 / transferred to U.S. Army Armor & Cavalry Collection, Fort Benning

The modèle 1916 gun's 37mm caliber was the smallest allowed for explosive shells under the 1899 Hague Convention and hence was used by many nations for small guns.

The guns were fitted to a tripod, to which wheels could be attached for transport. The guns could also be carried by four soldiers, after being broken down into two loads: the 104-pound (47 kg) gun and recoil mechanism, and the 84-pound (38 kg) trails, each of which could be carried by two soldiers. Some were equipped with a gun shield. The breech-block of the gun was essentially a smaller version of that fitted to the well-known French 75 gun.

The guns could be crewed by two soldiers, a loader and an aimer, and had a maximum rate of fire of around 35 rounds per minute. They were equipped with a removable APX telescopic sight for direct fire, and a quadrant sight for indirect fire.

In U.S. service, each gun was assigned an ammunition limber, which carried 14 boxes containing 16 rounds of ammunition each as well as tools and accessories. The gun and its limber were normally together towed by a single horse or mule, but were manhandled forward if contact with the enemy was expected.

U.S. high explosive ammunition for the TRP was the Mark II HE shell with a projectile weighing 0.67 kilograms (1.5 lb) and a TNT bursting charge of 27.2 grams. The French Army used the Obus explosif Mle1916 HE round with a projectile weighing 0.555 kilograms (1.22 lb) and a bursting charge of 30 grams. Captured rounds of this type were designated Sprgr 147(f) by the German military in World War II.

== Service history ==
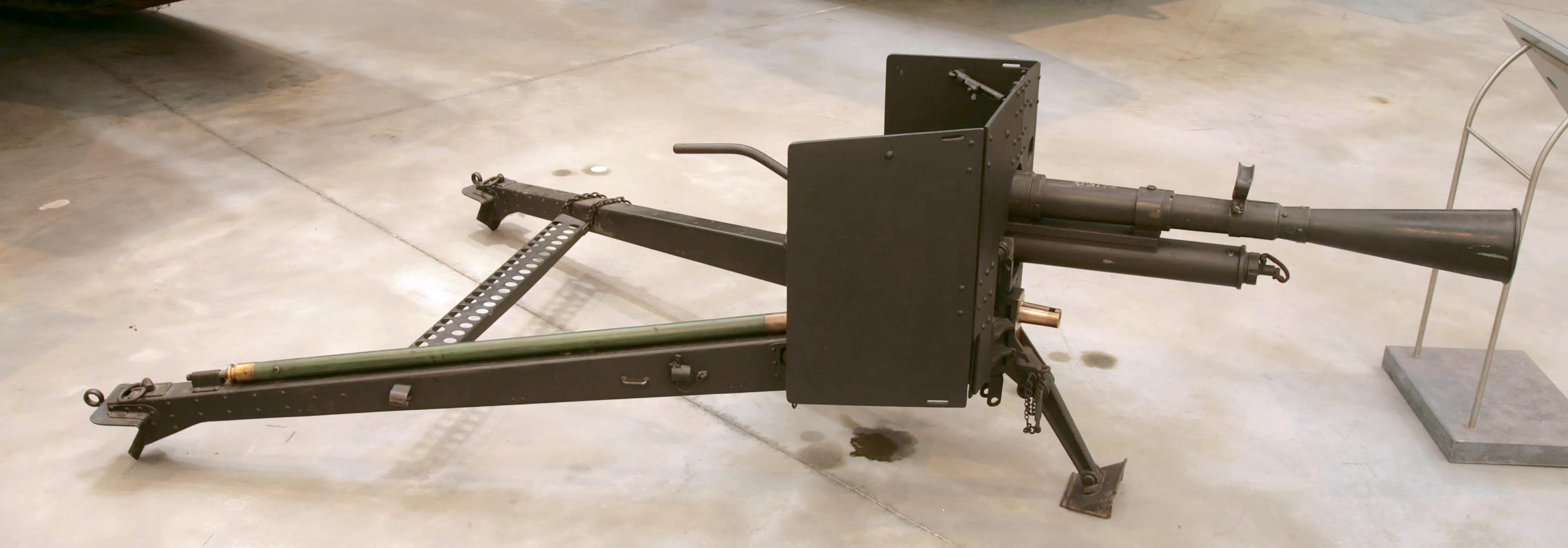
37 mm TRP Mle 1916 at the Royal Museum of the Armed Forces and Military History, Brussels

During the First World War, the guns saw widespread use with both French and United States forces and were designated the 37mm M1916 in U.S. service. In combat they were found to be wanting, and it was found their intended task of destroying gun emplacements was better done by mortars. As well as infantry use, the guns were also fitted to the M1917 light tank, the first mass-produced tank made in the U.S. These tanks (Americanized copies of the Renault FT) entered service too late for World War I, and none ever saw action.

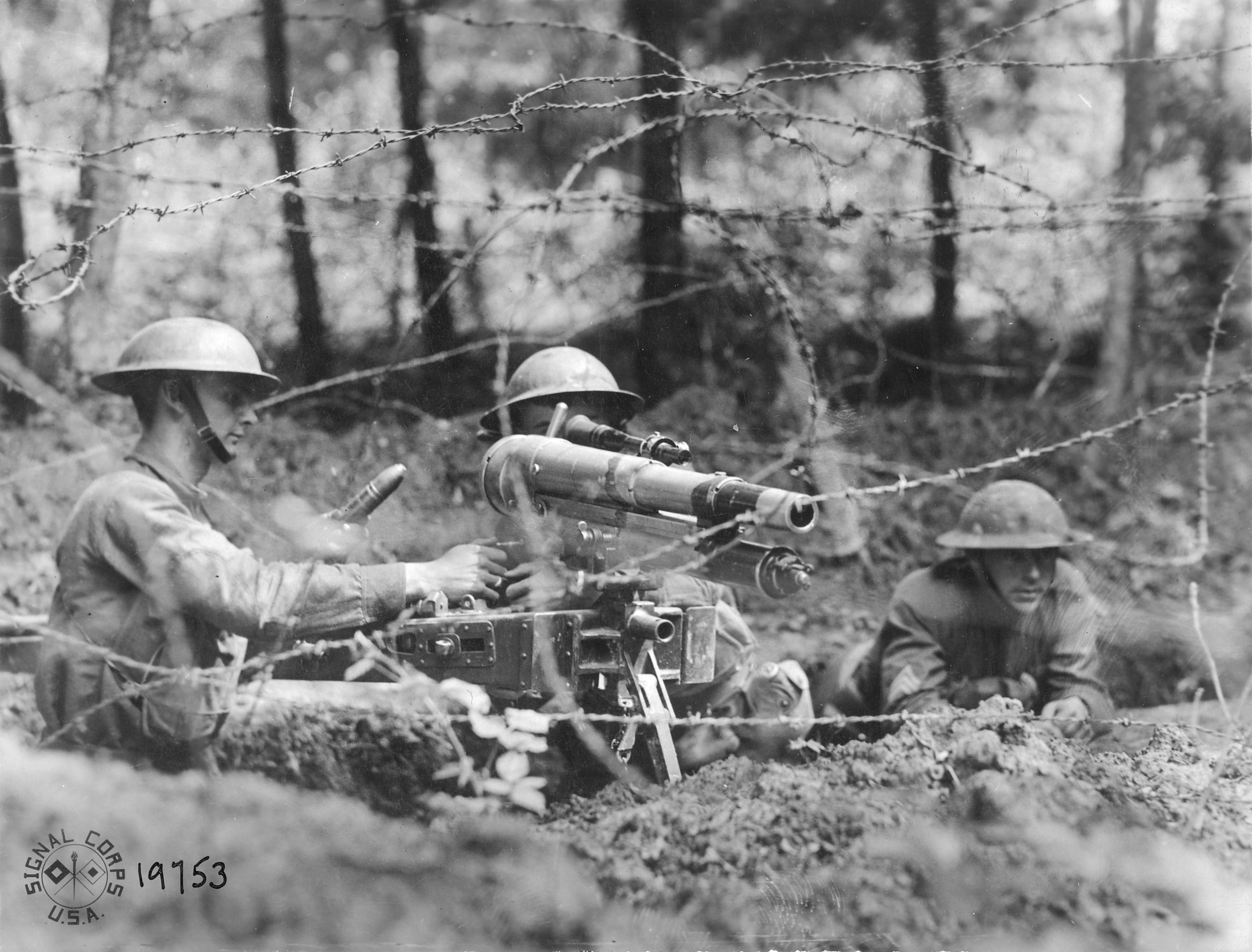
37-mm M1916 in action with U.S. forces, 1918. This gun does not have the flash suppressor

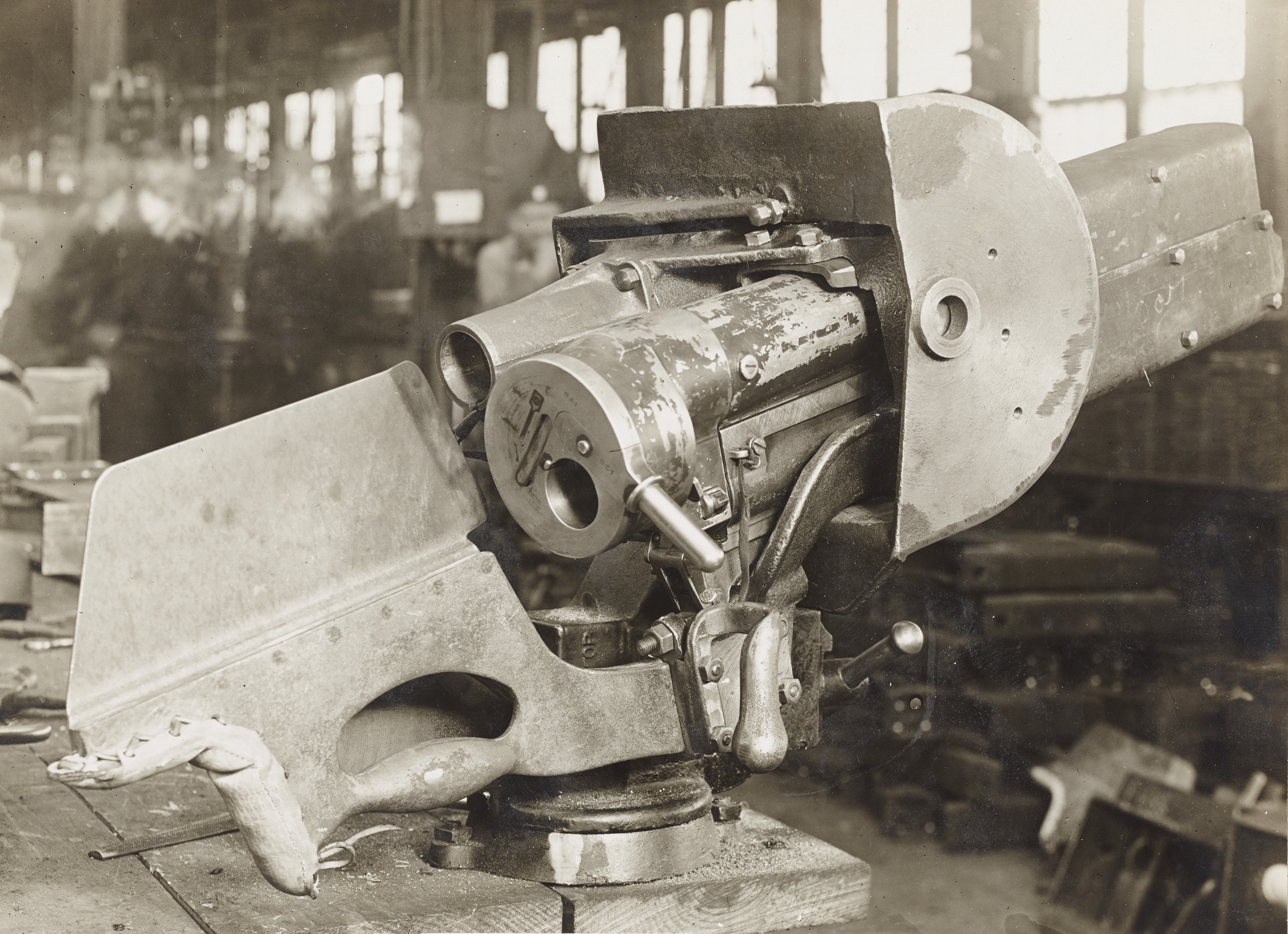
37-mm M1916 gun mount in the M1917 light tank, showing its eccentric breech block

During the interwar years the U.S. Army organized its infantry regiments with "howitzer companies," armed, with among other heavy infantry weapons for want of actual infantry support howitzers, 37 mm M1916 guns. The Regular Army could not afford to maintain full companies (instead using platoons), but the National Guard could. The Army adopted a .22 caliber sub-caliber device as an economic measure that allowed training with the guns on indoor ranges. By 1941, the howitzer companies of regiments were disbanded and converted to antitank platoons; the Army put most of the M1916 guns into storage, scrapped them, or converted their mechanisms for use as sub-caliber training devices for heavy guns. Some were used in the Philippines campaign in 1941-42 as antitank weapons due to shortages of the 37 mm gun M3. The Japanese Type 11 37 mm infantry gun was based on this design.

The French Army still had the cannon in service in 1940 as a substitute for the 25 mm Hotchkiss anti-tank gun, which was in short supply. After the defeat of France by Germany, the Wehrmacht began using the TRP under the designation 3.7 cm IG 152(f).

Some were used by the Việt Minh at the beginning of the First Indochina War.

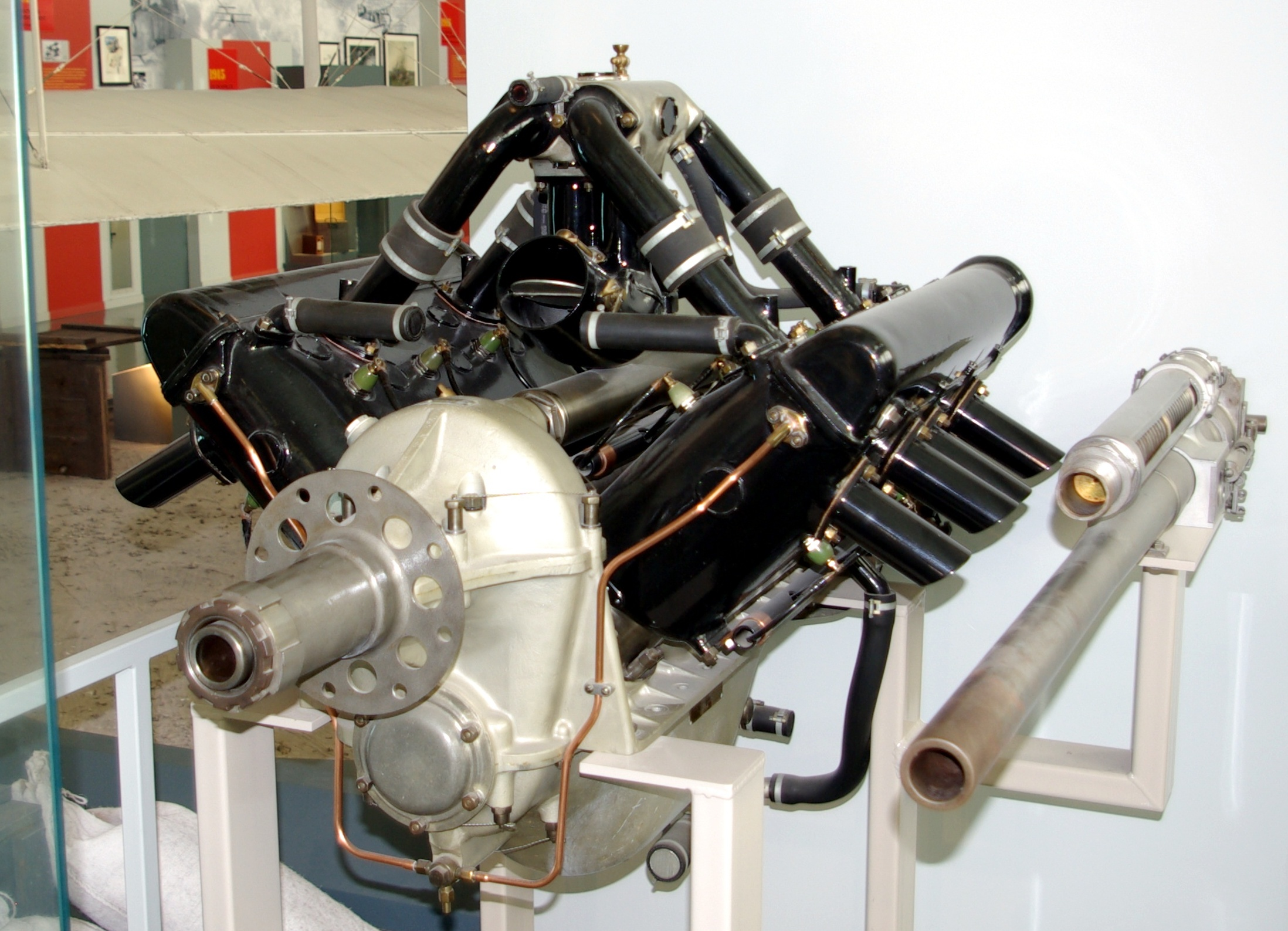
A geared-output shaft HS.8C engine for a SPAD S.XII, showing the elevated intake manifold to clear the 37mm cannon mounted in the "vee" between the cylinder banks

== Aircraft use ==
The gun was fitted on some aircraft, firing through the propeller's spinner to avoid hitting the blades. It was used in combat on the 1917 French SPAD S.XII. The prototype 1917 British Beardmore W.B.V shipborne fighter was fitted with a 37mm for use against airships, but the gun was considered dangerous and removed.

== See also ==
- List of infantry guns
- List of aircraft artillery

Similar weapons

- 3.7 cm Infanteriegeschütz M.15
- 37 mm trench gun M1915
- 37 mm Infantry Gun Model 1917
- 3.7 cm TAK 1918
- Type 11 37 mm infantry gun
- Puteaux SA 18
