= Sturmgeschütz III =

WW2 German assault gun

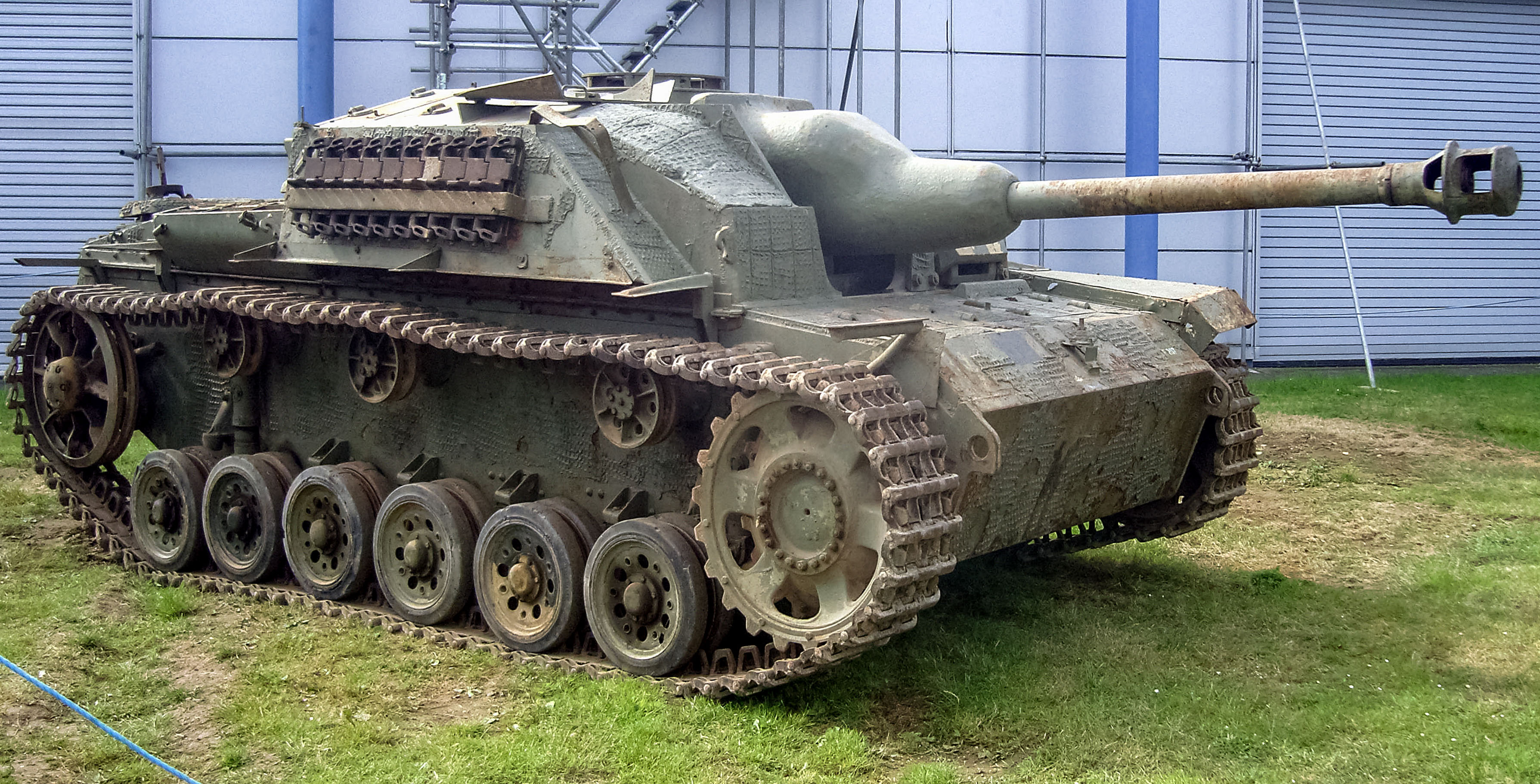
- Sturmgeschütz III Ausführung G (Late) with "Saukopf" (sow-head) mantlet
- Type: Assault gun
- Place of origin: Germany

Service history
- In service: 1940–1945 (German service); 1949–1973 (Syrian service)
- Used by: See Operators
- Wars: World War II; War over Water; Six-Day War; Yom Kippur War

Production history
- Designer: Alkett
- Manufacturer: Alkett, MIAG
- Unit cost: 82,500 ℛ︁ℳ︁
- No. built: c. 10,086 StuG III; c. 1,299 StuH 42

Specifications (StuG III Ausf. G, 1942)
- Mass: 23.9 tonnes (52,690 lbs)
- Length: 6.85 m (22 ft 6 in)
- Width: 2.95 m (9 ft 8 in)
- Height: 2.16 m (7 ft 1 in)
- Crew: 4 (driver, commander, gunner and loader)
- Armour: 16–80 mm (.62–3.15 in)
- Main armament: 1 × 7.5 cm StuK 40 L/48; 54 rounds
- Secondary armament: 1 × 7.92 mm MG34 or MG42 machine gun (600 rounds); 1 × coaxial 7.92 mm MG34 machine gun from 1944 on (600 rounds
- Engine: Maybach HL120 TRM V-12 gasoline engine 300 PS (296 hp, 220 kW)
- Power/weight: 12 PS (9.2 kW) / tonne
- Transmission: six-speed transmission
- Suspension: torsion bar
- Fuel capacity: 300–320 L (66–70 imp gal; 79–85 US gal)
- Operational range: Road: 155 km (96 mi); Cross-country: 75 km (47 mi) (.9 mpg_{‑US} (1.1 mpg_{‑imp}; 260 L/100 km) at 22 mph (35 km/h), 71 US gal (59 imp gal; 270 L) fuel)
- Maximum speed: 40 km/h (25 mph)

The Sturmgeschütz III (StuG III) was an assault gun produced by Germany during World War II. It was the most-produced German fully tracked armoured fighting vehicle, and second-most produced German armored combat vehicle of any type after the Sd.Kfz. 251 half-track. It was built on a slightly modified Panzer III chassis, replacing the turret with an armored, fixed superstructure mounting a more powerful gun. Initially intended as a mobile assault gun for direct-fire support for infantry, the StuG III was continually modified, and much like the later Jagdpanzer vehicles, was employed as a tank destroyer.

== Development ==
The Sturmgeschütz originated from German experiences in World War I, when it was discovered that, during the offensives on the Western Front, infantry lacked the means to engage fortifications. Their MG-08 machine guns and Minenwerfers were too heavy to accompany German assault troops for long periods of time, much less field artillery. The German army adopted by modifying field guns, like captured Russian 76.2 mm pieces, into makeshift infantry guns (Infanteriegeschütze). The infantry guns were attached to infantry regiments and provided responsive immediate fire support against fortified machine guns positions. By the end of the war, the Imperial German army had developed the purpose built 7.5 cm leichtes Infanteriegeschütz 18, or 7.5 cm le.IG 18.

The interwar German army kept the 7.5 cm le.IG 18 and later added the 15cm schweres Infanteriegeschütz 33 (sIG 33) infantry gun to the regimental cannon companies. The heavy firepower came at the cost of a 1,800 kg (4,000 lb) gun that required horses to move. As a consequence, the sIG was not suitable for an accompanying gun supporting the infantry attack. The 7.5cm infantry gun provided decent firepower but was still heavy to move.

Erich von Manstein is considered the father of the Sturmartillerie (assault artillery). He had served as an infantrymen in World War I and so was intimately familiar with the requirement for immediate fire support for infantry assaults. In the interwar period Oberst (Colonel) Manstein served as the chief of the operations section of the German General Staff - a position that he used to advocate for what became known as assault guns (Sturmgeschütze). Unlike self-propelled guns, where the vehicle is used as a means of movement, Manstein envisioned the Sturmgeschütz as an armoured fighting vehicle providing mobile direct fire support to infantry commanders. He also envisioned the vehicles as controlled by the artillery branch, not armor or the infantry. Manstein's proposal was to attach an assault gun battalion (Sturmgeschütz-Abteilung) of three batteries of six guns to each infantry division - thus giving the division commander responsive fire support at the Schwerpunkt (decisive point) of the operation. The proposal was approved by Generaloberst Werner von Fritsch, the commander in chief, to develop a new assault gun.

Soon thereafter, the assault gun concept ran into stiff resistance, most notably from Generalleutnant Heinz Guderian, an advocate of building up the strength of the panzer arm, and he saw the StuG III diverting scarce resources away from the Panzer Mark III tanks. Guderian failed to stop the StuG III plan but succeeded in reducing Manstein's battery per infantry division. The new Sturmgeschütz battalions would be held at the field army level.

On 15 June 1936, Daimler-Benz AG received an order to develop an armoured infantry support vehicle capable of mounting a 7.5 cm (2.95 in) caliber gun. The gun mount's fixed, fully integrated casemate superstructure allowed a limited traverse of 20° and provided overhead protection for the crew. The height of the vehicle was not to exceed that of the average soldier.

Daimler-Benz AG used the chassis and running gear of its recent Panzer III medium tank as the basis for the new vehicle. Prototype manufacture was passed over to Alkett, who produced five prototypes in 1937 on a Panzer III Ausführung B (Ausf. B) chassis. These prototypes had a mild steel superstructure and a Krupp short-barrelled 7.5 cm StuK 37 L/24 gun. Production vehicles with this gun were known as Gepanzerte Selbstfahrlafette für Sturmgeschütz 7.5 cm Kanone Ausführung A bis D (Sd.Kfz.142).

As the StuG was designed for infantry close support, early models mounted a howitzer-pattern, 7.5 cm StuK 37 L/24 gun, similar to gun mounted in early versions of the turreted Panzer IV. The StuK L/24 gun was designed primarily to fire high explosive shells to destroy hostile enemy heavy weapons. The gun could also fire Panzergranate armor piercing shells but in a secondary role. The manufacture and fielding of the StuG III was such a low priority that only four batteries took part in the Battle of France in May-June 1940. The StuG III proved effective in close support by filling the gap between the horse drawn artillery of the infantry divisions and the infantry regiments. The Germans also found the motorized artillery in the panzer divisions were less effective in rapid movement than the fully mechanized Stug III batteries. Lastly, the purpose built StuG III performed better than the poorly engineered 15cm sIG auf Ausf B. - an assault gun created by mounting the 15cm sIG infantry gun on an otherwise obsolete Panzer Mk I chassis. StuG III production was increased in the months leading up to Operation Operation Barbarossa. By June 1941 the Wehrmacht had eleven StuG III Abteilungen and five batteries, totalling 339 machines, that would support the invasion of the Soviet Union. Most of these vehicles were the Alkett-manufactured StuG Ausf. B, which had an improved transmission and steering gear.

The early StuG III performed well during the Battle of France but Ausf. C and Ausf. D incorporated further changes: improved road wheels, oil bath air cleaners, improved front armor, and a new sight aperture to eliminate a shot trap. The original sight was replaced by an artillery scissors periscope. These marks of vehicles were made by Alkett from May to September 1941. Ausf. E, produced from September 1941 to February 1942 featured a wider casemate with room for radio equipment. All these early marks were powered by the same Maybach HL 120 TRM gasoline engine and armed with the 7.5cm StuK L/24.

After the Germans encountered the Soviet KV-1 heavy and T-34 medium tanks, a StuG III Ausf. E was modified with a high-velocity 7.5 cm StuK 40 L/43 main gun. 120 of the vehicle, designated Ausf. F, were made by Alkett before the longer barreled more capable 7.5 cm StuK 40 L/48 was installed and used for the remainder of the Ausf. F. The StuG III F/8 begin appearing in September 1942, which incorporated changes made concurrently to the PzKpfw III 8./Z.W. Changes included the adding of towing brackets to the frontal armor, supplemental 50 mm rear armor and improvements to track guards and engine louvers. Later vehicles in this production run featured bolted 30 mm supplemental front armor, redesigned hatches, and a prototype hinged machine gun shield for the loader's hatch. The final variant, the StuG III Ausf. G entered production in December 1942. Demand for the vehicles was so high that Alkett, Muhlenbau-Industrie AG (Miag), Maschinenfabrik Augsburg-Nurnburg (MAN), were involved. The chassis, main gun and engine remained the same as the Ausf F/8, while the casemate received significant changes. A commander's cupola with periscopes was added on top of a raised roof, while the sides were sloped to increase resistance to shot. The Ausf. G remained in production until the end of the war, and received many smaller engineering changes, which included a cast Topfblende mantlet, improved driver's ports, and adding a coaxial machine gun. Total production for this variant ran over 7,800 vehicles.

Alkett also experimented with mounting a 105 mm leFH 18 howitzer into an adapted StuG III Ausf. E, that proved successful and Alkett ultimately manufactured about 1,300 Sturmhaubitze Ausf G by the end of the war. The 10.5 cm howitzer fired a larger high explosive shell with double the charge of the comparable 7.5cm shell, thus was well suited for reducing fortified positions. When Alkett's plant was hit by Allied bombs in late 1943, the Germans adapted by mating the StuG III superstructure to the hull of a Panzer IV Ausf. H. The hybrid vehicle proved successful and was named the Sturmgeschütz IV. Production of this armored fighting vehicle ran concurrently with the StuG III and both remained in production to the end of the war.

== Operational history ==
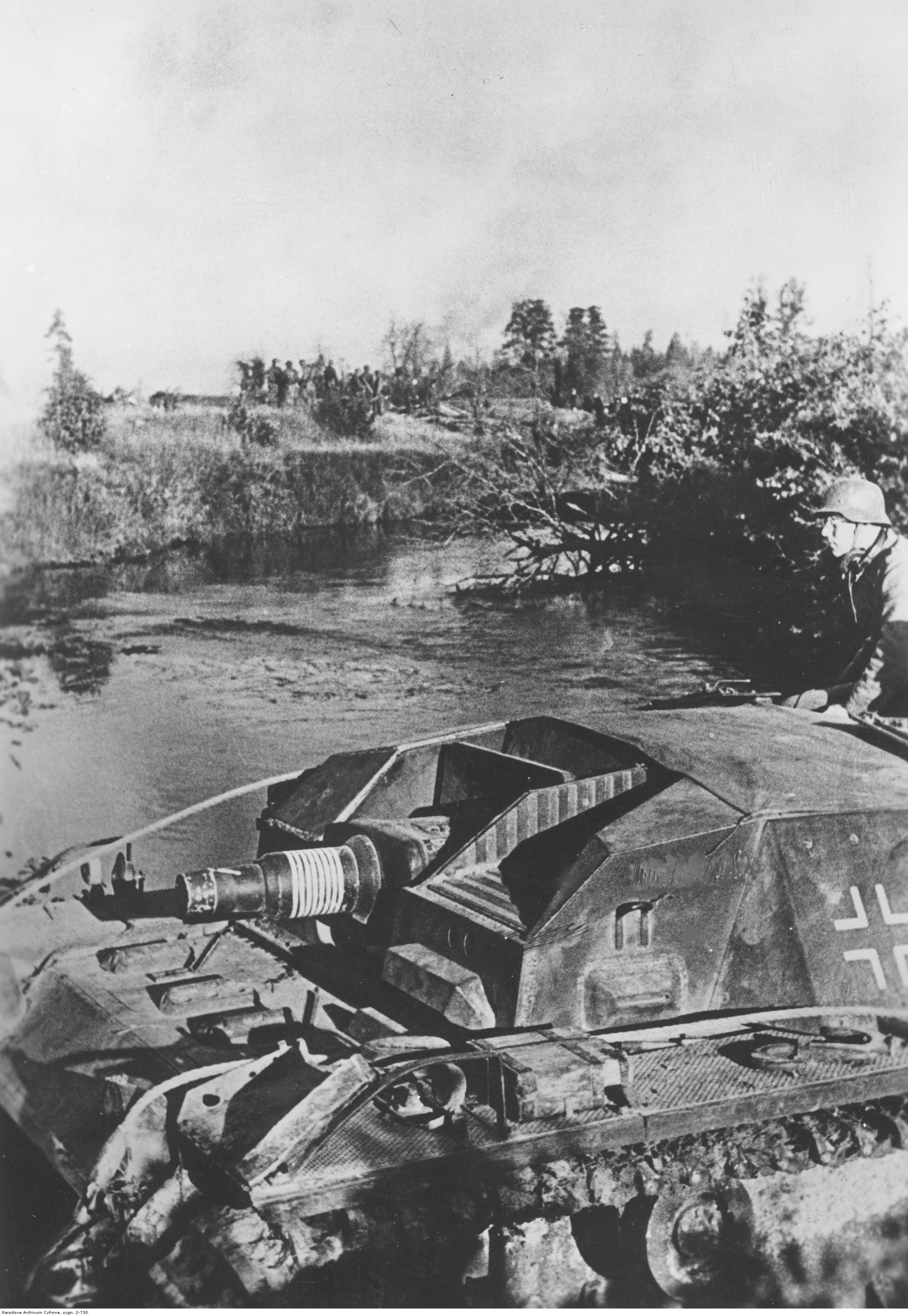
German forces on a short-barrel StuG III Ausf B cross the Desna river on their march east, 1941.

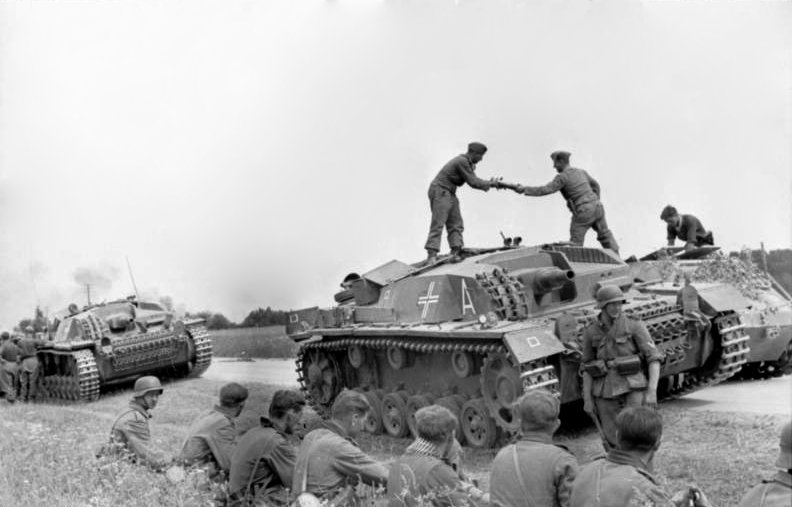
StuG III Ausf.B in Latvia during the Baltic Operation

=== German army ===
As noted above, the four batteries of StuG III to participate in the Battle of France proved their worth to the Heer leadership. Additional batteries, and detachments consisting of three batteries each, were activated in the fall and winter of 1940. Two StuG III battalions supported the Balkans Campaign (World War II) and eleven StuG II Abteilungen and five batteries took part in the 1941 invasion of the Soviet Union. Most early marks of the StuG III were earmarked for Operation Barbarossa, leaving few of the assault guns for other theaters. For example, General Erwin Rommel's Afrika Korps received only a single detachment of StuG III Ausf. D in early 1942. Rommel was instead given a variety of self-propelled guns pieced together from existing components --like the 15cm sIG 33 auf Fahrgestell Panzerkampwagen II (Sf)--or from mating a German artillery piece to a French tank chassis.

The wastage on the Eastern Front and demands on German heavy industry meant the losses of 1941 were not corrected until mid-1942. The Germans had about 210 StuG III (of all Ausf.) in eighteen battalions for the start of Operation Blau. The Heer continued to add StuG III battalions and by mid-November 1942 had roughly 442 of the armored fighting vehicles in twenty battalions.

=== Other armies ===
As the war on the Eastern Front shifted to the Allies, the Finnish Army faced the possibility of defending against the Red Army again, after the Winter War. The Finnish Army received approval from Adolf Hitler to receive forty-five StuG III Ausf. G to form an assault gun battalion for their sole armored division. The assault gun battalion was organized in February 1943, but its cadre did not reach Germany for training until June 1943. Over a five week course, half the Finnish students learned to operate the StuG III, while the remainder learned to maintain and repair the vehicle. The first cadre returned to Finland in August 1943 to begin training the remainder of the battalion - which included several officers who had served with Finnish Waffen-SS units previously. The assault gun battalion was operational by the fall of the 1943, with 22 assault guns in three firing companies - and the remaining 8 StuG III held in depot level reserve. The Finnish Tank Centre performed several modifications: removing the Schurzen, adding wooden storage chests on the rear hull, substituting Red Army/Finnish small arms weapons for the German MG42 and MP40s, and repainting in the Finnish army camouflage scheme. During the defense of Kuuterselkä on the Karelian Isthmus in August 1944, the Finnish assault battalion claimed the following kills: T-34 (all types), 65; ISU-152, 13; KV-1, 5; all others 4. By contrast, the Finns lost five StuG III. Finnish crews referred to the Stug III by an early German designation, Stu. 40 or more commonly "Sturmi."

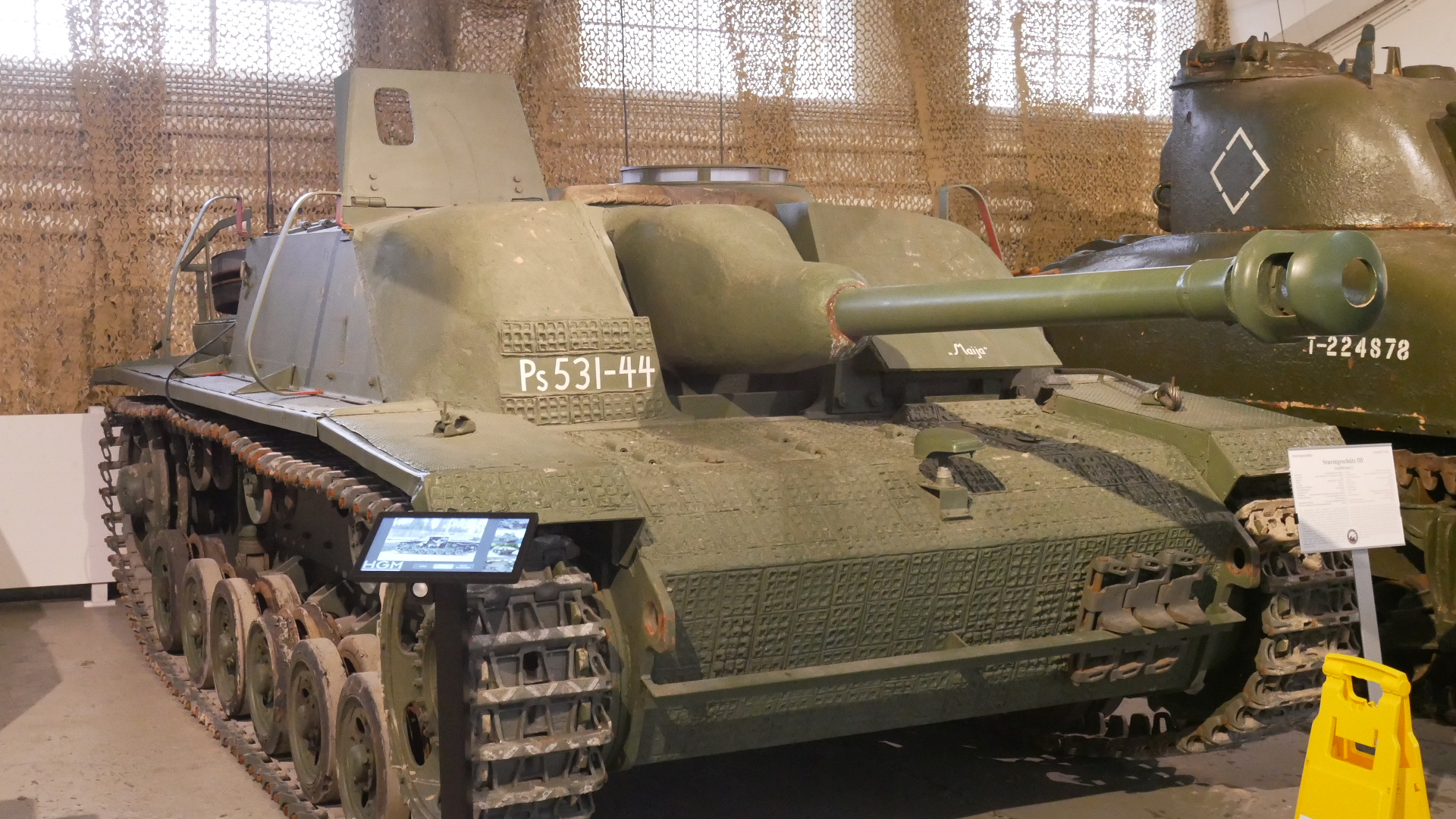
A StuG III of the Finnish Army in the Heeresgeschichtliches Museum in Vienna, Austria. This model has the concrete armor added postwar by the Finnish Army.

One hundred StuG III Ausf. Gs were delivered to Romania in the autumn of 1943. They were officially known as TAs (or TAs T3 to avoid confusion with TAs T4 (Jagdpanzer IVs)) in their army's inventory. By February 1945, 13 were still in use with the 2nd Armoured Regiment. None of this initial batch survived the war. Thirty-one TAs were on the Romanian military's inventory in November 1947. Most of them were probably StuG III Ausf. Gs and a small number of Panzer IV/70 (V) (same as TAs T4). These TAs were supplied by the Red Army or were damaged units repaired by the Romanian Army. All German equipment was removed from service in 1950 and finally scrapped four years later due to the army's decision to use only Soviet armour.

StuG IIIs were also exported to other nations friendly to Germany, including Bulgaria, Hungary, Italy, and Spain. Hungary fielded its StuG IIIs against Soviet forces as they invaded their country in end-1944 up until early 1945. Bulgaria also received several StuGs from Germany but almost none saw service against the Soviets, the country having ended the alliance with Germany by switching sides to the Allies before the Soviets invaded. Post-World War II, these were used for a short time before being turned into fixed gun emplacements on the Krali Marko Line on the border with neighbouring Turkey. StuG IIIs were also given to the pro-German Croatian Ustaše Militia, most of which were captured in Yugoslavia by Tito's Yugoslav partisans during and after the war, as did German-operated vehicles. These were used by the Yugoslav People's Army until the 1950s when they were replaced by more modern combat vehicles. Spain received a small number (around 10) of StuG IIIs from Germany during World War II, later sold to Syria between 1950 and 1960. Italy received 12 StuG III Ausf.Gs previously owned by local German units in 1943. They were donated, along with 12 Panzer III Ausf.Ns, 12 Panzer IV Ausf.Gs and 24 8.8 cm Flak 37 complete with half-track tractors, to the Armored Division "M", an intended elite unit composed by Blackshirts. With the fall of the Fascist regime and the Italian Armistice all equipment given to them was recovered by the Germans and used against the Allies.

After World War II, abandoned German StuG IIIs remained in many European nations Germany had occupied during the war years, such as Czechoslovakia, France, Norway and Yugoslavia. The Soviet Union also captured hundreds of StuGs, most ending up being donated to Syria. An Italian 12.7 mm Breda-SAFAT machine gun taken from Syrian Fiat G.55 was mounted on the commander cupola with retrofitted anti-aircraft mount. Syria continued to use StuG IIIs along with other war surplus armoured fighting vehicles received from the USSR or Czechoslovakia (varying from long-barrelled Panzer IVs (late models) and T-34-85s) during the 1950s and up until the War over Water against Israel in the mid-1960s. By the time of the Six-Day War in 1967, many of them had been either destroyed, stripped for spare parts, scrapped or emplaced on the Golan Heights as pillboxes. Some remained in service up to the Yom Kippur War in 1973. None remain in service today. A few Syrian StuG IIIs ended up in Israeli hands and became war memorials or were simply left rusting away on former battlefields.

== Variants ==
Production numbers were:

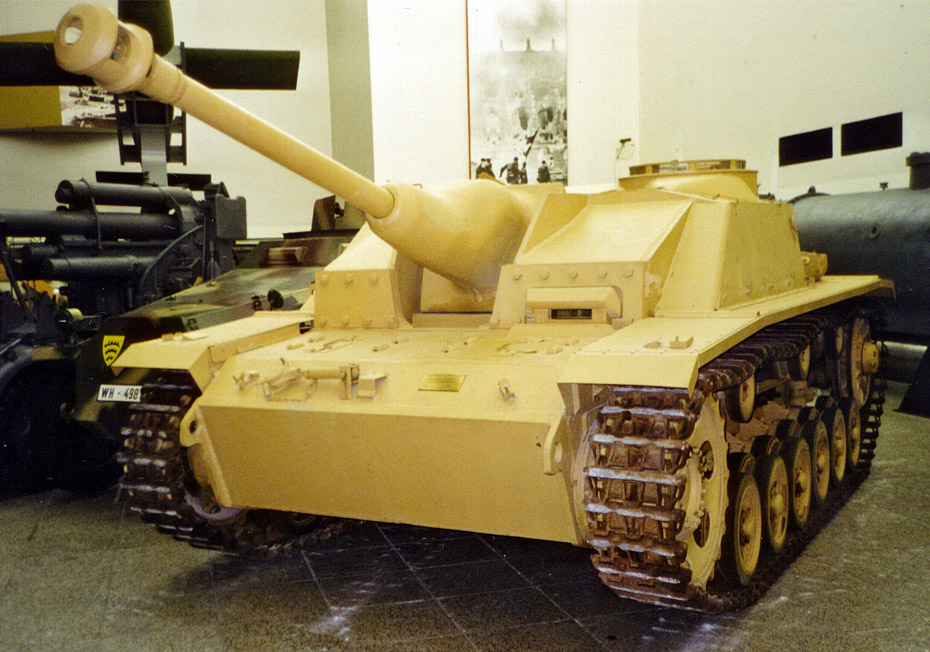
A StuG III in the Military History Museum of Dresden.

- StuG III prototypes (1937, 5 produced on Panzer III Ausf. B chassis): by December 1937, two vehicles were in service with Panzer Regiment 1 in Erfurt. Vehicles had eight road wheels per side with 360-millimetre (14 in) wide tracks, 14.5 mm thick soft steel superstructure and the 7.5 cm StuK 37 L/24 gun. Although not suitable for combat, they were used for training purposes as late as 1941.

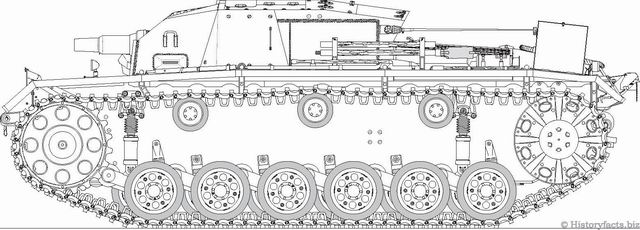
StuG III, Ausf. A.

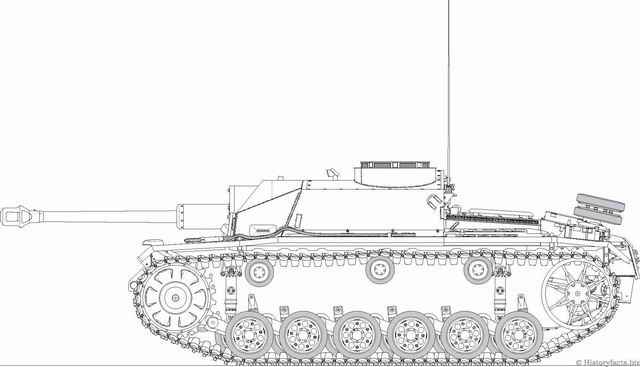
Initial Production StuG III Ausf. G, December 1942

- StuG III Ausf. A (Sd.Kfz. 142; January–May 1940, 30+6 produced by Daimler-Benz): first used in the Battle of France, the StuG III Ausf. A used a modified 5./ZW chassis (Panzer III Ausf. F) with front armour strengthened to 50 mm. The last six vehicles were built on chassis diverted from Panzer III Ausf. G production.
- StuG III Ausf. B: (Sd.Kfz 142; June 1940–May 1941, 300 produced by Alkett) Modified 7./ZW chassis (Panzer III Ausf. H), widened tracks (380 mm). Two rubber tires on each roadwheel were accordingly widened from 520 × 79 mm to 520 × 95 mm each. Both types of roadwheel were interchangeable. The troublesome 10-speed transmission was changed to a 6-speed one. The forwardmost return rollers were re-positioned further forward, reducing the vertical movements of the tracks before they were fed to the forward drive sprocket, and so reduced the chance of tracks being thrown. In the middle of production of the Ausf. B model, the original drive sprocket with eight round holes was changed to a new cast drive sprocket with six pie slice-shaped slots. This new drive wheel could take either 380 mm tracks or 360 mm wide tracks. 380 mm tracks were not exclusive to new drive wheels, as spacer rings could be added to the older sprockets. Vehicle number 90111 shows the older drive wheel with wider 380 mm tracks.
- StuG III Ausf. C: (Sd.Kfz 142; April 1941, 50 produced) Gunner's forward view port above driver's visor was a shot trap and thus eliminated; instead, superstructure top was given an opening for gunner's periscope. Idler wheel was redesigned.
- StuG III Ausf. D: (Sd.Kfz 142; May–September 1941, 150 produced) Simply a contract extension on Ausf. C. On-board intercom installed, transmission hatch locks added, otherwise identical to Ausf. C.
- StuG III Ausf. E: (Sd.Kfz 142; September 1941 – February 1942, 284 produced) Superstructure sides added extended rectangular armoured boxes for radio equipment. Increased space allowed room for six additional rounds of ammunition for the main gun (giving a maximum of 50) plus a machine gun. One MG 34 and seven drum-type magazines were carried in the right rear side of the fighting compartment to protect the vehicle from enemy infantry. Vehicle commanders were officially provided with SF14Z stereoscopic scissor periscopes. Stereoscopic scissor type periscopes for artillery spotters may have been used by vehicle commanders from the start.
- StuG III Ausf. F: (Sd.Kfz 142/1; March–September 1942, 366 produced) The first real up-gunning of the StuG, this version uses the longer 7.5 cm StuK 40 L/43 gun. Firing armour-piercing Panzergranat-Patrone 39, the StuK 40 L/43 could penetrate 91 mm of armour inclined 30 degrees from vertical at 500 m, 82 mm at 1,000 m, 72 mm at 1,500 m, 63 mm at 2,000 m, allowing the Ausf. F to engage most Soviet armoured vehicles at normal combat ranges. This change marked the StuG as being more of a tank destroyer than an infantry support vehicle. A ventilation port and exhaust fan was added to the top of the fighting compartment to evacuate fumes from spent shells, to enable the firing of continuous shots. Additional 30 mm armour plates were welded to the 50 mm frontal armour from June 1942, making the frontal armour 80 mm thick. From June 1942, Ausf. F were mounted with approximately 13 inch (334 mm to be exact) longer 7,5 cm StuK 40 L/48 gun. Firing above mentioned ammunition, longer L/48 could penetrate 96 mm, 85 mm, 74 mm, 64 mm respectively (30 degrees from vertical).
- StuG III Ausf. F/8: (Sd.Kfz 142/1; September–December 1942, 250 produced) Introduction of an improved hull design similar to that used for the Panzer III Ausf. J / L with increased rear armour. This was 8th version of the Panzer III hull, thus the designation "F/8". This hull has towing hook holes extending from side walls. From October 1942, 30 mm thick plates of additional armour were bolted (previously welded) on to speed up the production line. From F/8, the 7.5 cm StuK 40 L/48 gun was standard until the last of the Ausf. G. Due to the lack of double baffle muzzle brakes, a few L/48 guns mounted on F/8s were fitted with the single baffle ball type muzzle brake used on the Panzer IV Ausf. F2/G.
- StuG III Ausf. G (Sd.Kfz. 142/1; December 1942 – April 1945, ~8,423 produced, 142 built on Panzer III Ausf. M chassis, 173 converted from Panzer III): The final and by far the most common of the StuG series. Upper superstructure was widened: welded boxes on either sides were abandoned. This new superstructure design increased its height to 2160 mm. The back wall of the fighting compartment was straightened, and the ventilation fan on top of the superstructure was relocated to the back of the fighting compartment. From March 1943, the driver's periscope was abandoned. In February 1943, Alkett was joined by MIAG as a second manufacturer. From May 1943, side hull spaced armour plates (Schürzen) were fitted to G models; these were primarily intended for protection against Russian anti-tank rifles, but were also useful against hollow-charge ammunition. Side plates were retrofitted to some Ausf. F/8 models, as they were to be fitted to all front line StuGs and other tanks by June 1943 in preparation for the battle of Kursk. Mountings for the Schürzen proved to be inadequate, as many were lost in the field. From March 1944, an improved mounting was introduced; as a result, side skirts are seen more often with late model Ausf G. From May 1943, 80 mm thick plates were used for frontal armour instead of two plates of 50 mm + 30 mm. However, a backlog of StuGs with completed 50 mm armour existed. For those, a 30 mm additional armour plate still had to be welded or bolted on until October 1943.

A rotating cupola with periscopes was added for the Ausf G.'s commander. However, from September 1943, the lack of ball bearings (resulting from USAAF bombing of Schweinfurt) forced cupolas to be welded on. Ball bearings were once again installed from August 1944. Shot deflectors for the cupolas were first installed from October 1943 from one factory, to be installed on all StuGs from February 1944. Some vehicles without shot deflectors carried several track pieces wired around the cupola for added protection.

From December 1942, a square machine gun shield for the loader was installed, allowing an MG34 to be factory installed on a StuG for the first time. When stowed this shield folded back, partially overlapping the front half of the loader's hatch cover. A curved protrusion welded to the backside of the shield pushed the shield forward as the front half of the loader's hatch cover was opened and guided the hatch cover to naturally engage a latch point on the shield, thus supporting the shield in its deployed position without exposing the loader to hostile forward fire. F/8 models had machine gun shields retro-fitted from early 1943. The loader's machine gun shield was later replaced by rotating machine gun mount that could be operated by the loader inside the vehicle sighting through a periscope. In April 1944, 27 of them were being field tested on the Eastern front. Favourable reports led to installation of these "remote" machine gun mounts from the summer of 1944.

From October 1943, G versions were fitted with the Topfblende pot mantlet (often called Saukopf "Pig's head") gun mantlet without a coaxial mount. This cast mantlet, which had a sloped and rounded shape, was more effective at deflecting shots than the original boxy Kastenblende mantlet that had armour varying in thickness from 45 mm to 50 mm. The lack of large castings meant that the trapezoid-shape boxy mantlet was also produced until the very end. Topfblende were fitted almost exclusively to Alkett-produced vehicles.

A coaxial machine gun was first added to boxy mantlets, from June 1944, and then to cast Topfblende, from October 1944, in the middle of "Topfblende" mantlet production. With the addition of this coaxial machine gun, all StuGs carried two MG 34 machine guns from autumn of 1944. Some previously completed StuGs with a boxy mantlet had a coaxial machine gun hole drilled to retrofit a coaxial machine gun; however, Topfblende produced from November 1943 to October 1944 without a machine gun opening could not be tampered with.

Also from November 1943 onwards, all-metal return rollers of a few different types were used due to lack of rubber supply. Zimmerit anti-magnetic coating to protect vehicles from magnetic mines was applied starting in September (MIAG facility) or November (Alkett facility) 1943 and ending in September 1944.

=== Further variants ===
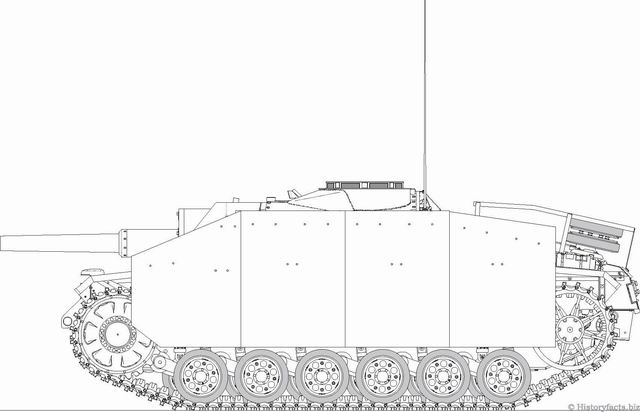
Sturmhaubitze 42 with Schürzen spaced armour plates

In 1942, a variant of the StuG Ausf. F was designed with a 10.5 cm (4.1 in) true howitzer instead of the 7.5 cm StuK 40 L/43 cannon. These new vehicles, designated StuH 42 (Sturmhaubitze 42, Sd.Kfz 142/2), were designed to provide infantry support with the increased number of StuG III Ausf. F/8s and Ausf. Gs being used in the anti-tank role. The StuH 42 mounted a variant of the 10.5 cm leFH 18 howitzer, modified to be electrically fired and fitted with a muzzle brake, called the 10.5 cm Sturmhaubitze 42 L/28 (10.5cm StuH 42 L/28). Production models were built on StuG III Ausf. G chassis. The muzzle brake was often omitted due to the scarcity of resources later in the war. Alkett produced 1,299 StuH 42s from March 1943 to 1945, the initial 12 vehicles were built on repaired StuG III Ausf. Fs and F/8s from the autumn of 1942 to January 1943.

In 1943, 10 StuG IIIs were converted to the StuG III (Flamm) configuration by replacing the main gun with a Schwade flamethrower. These chassis were all refurbished at the depot level and were a variety of pre-Ausf. F models. There are no reports to indicate that any of these were used in combat and all were returned to Ausf. G standard at depot level by 1944.

In late 1941, the StuG chassis was selected to carry the 15 cm sIG 33 heavy infantry gun. These vehicles were known as Sturm-Infanteriegeschütz 33B. Twenty-four were rebuilt on older StuG III chassis, of which twelve vehicles saw combat in the Battle of Stalingrad, where they were destroyed or captured. The remaining 12 vehicles were assigned to the 23rd Panzer Division.

Due to the dwindling supply of rubber, rubber-saving road wheels were tested during 8–14 November 1942, but did not go into production.

Bombing raids on the Alkett factory resulted in a significant drop in StuG III production in November 1943. To make up for this loss of production, Krupp displayed a substitution StuG on a Panzer IV chassis to Hitler on 16–17 December 1943. From January 1944 onwards, the StuG IV, based on the Panzer IV chassis and with a slightly modified StuG III superstructure, entered production.

Field modifications were made to increase the vehicle's survivability, resulting in diversity to already numerous variants; cement plastered on front superstructure, older Ausf.C/D retrofitted with a KwK 40 L/48 gun, Ausf.G mounting the Panzer IV cupola, a coaxial MG34 through a hole drilled on a boxy mantlet, etc.

The Soviet SU-76i self-propelled gun was based on captured StuG IIIs and Panzer IIIs. In total, Factory #37 in Sverdlovsk manufactured 181 SU-76i, plus 20 commander SU-76is for Red Army service by adding an enclosed superstructure and the 76.2 mm S-1 tank gun.

Approximately 10,000 StuG IIIs of various types were produced from 1940 to 1945 by Alkett (~7,500) and from 1943 to 1945 by MIAG (2,586). From April to July 1944, some 173 Panzer IIIs were converted into StuG III Ausf. Gs. The 1,299 StuH 42z and the 12 conversions from the StuG III were solely built by Alkett.

== Gallery ==
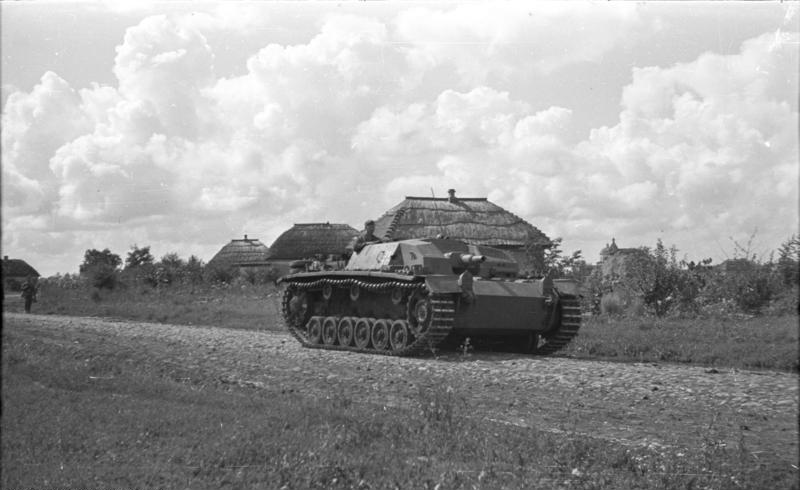
StuG III Ausf.B in the Soviet Union, 1941.

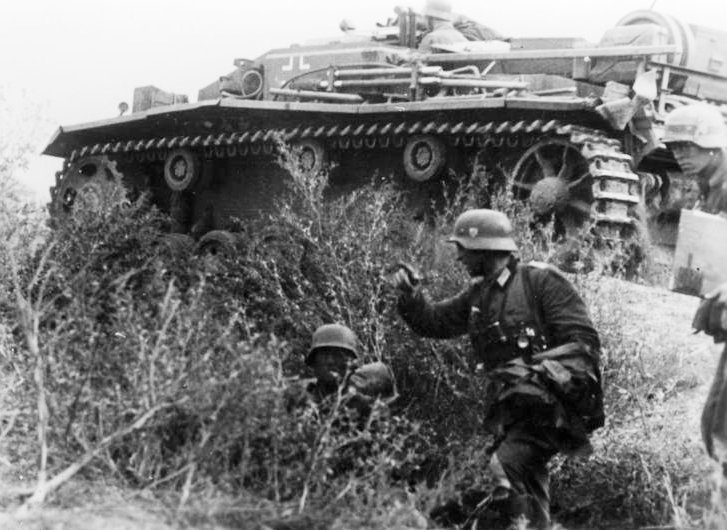
Battle of Stalingrad: Infantry and a supporting StuG assault gun advance towards the city center.

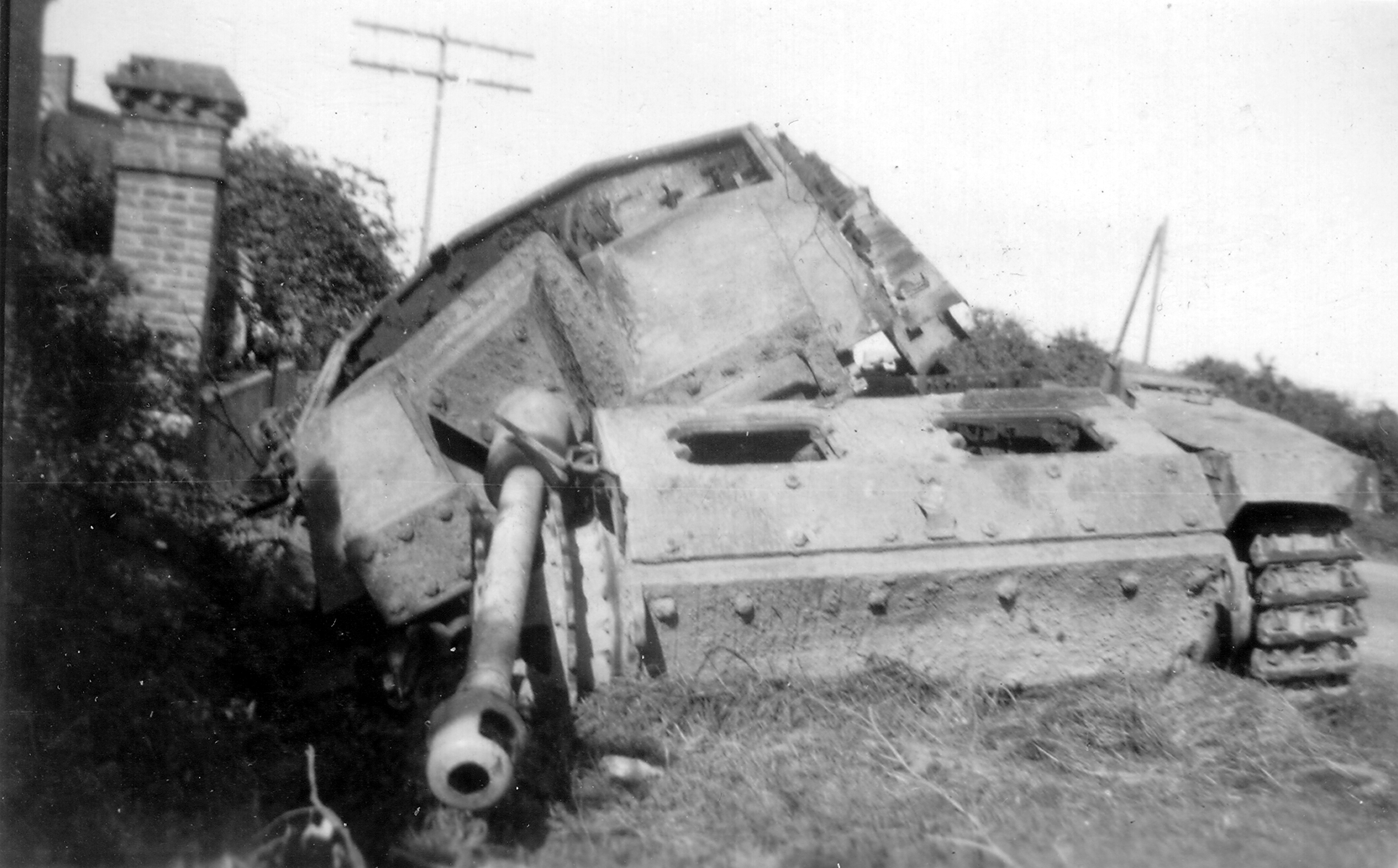
A StuG III Ausf.G destroyed in Normandy by a catastrophic internal explosion, 1944.

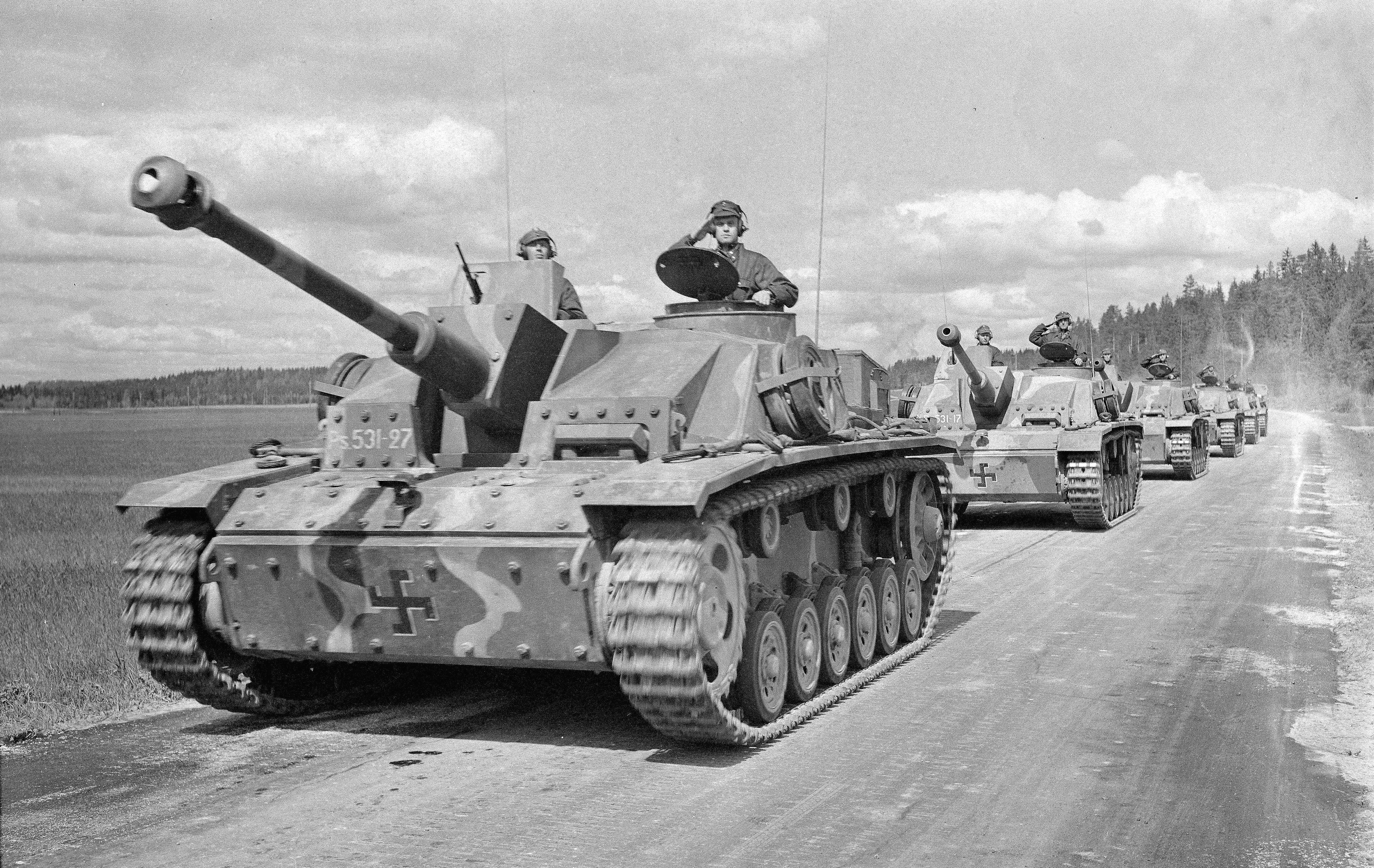
Finnish StuG III Ausf. G (June, 1944).

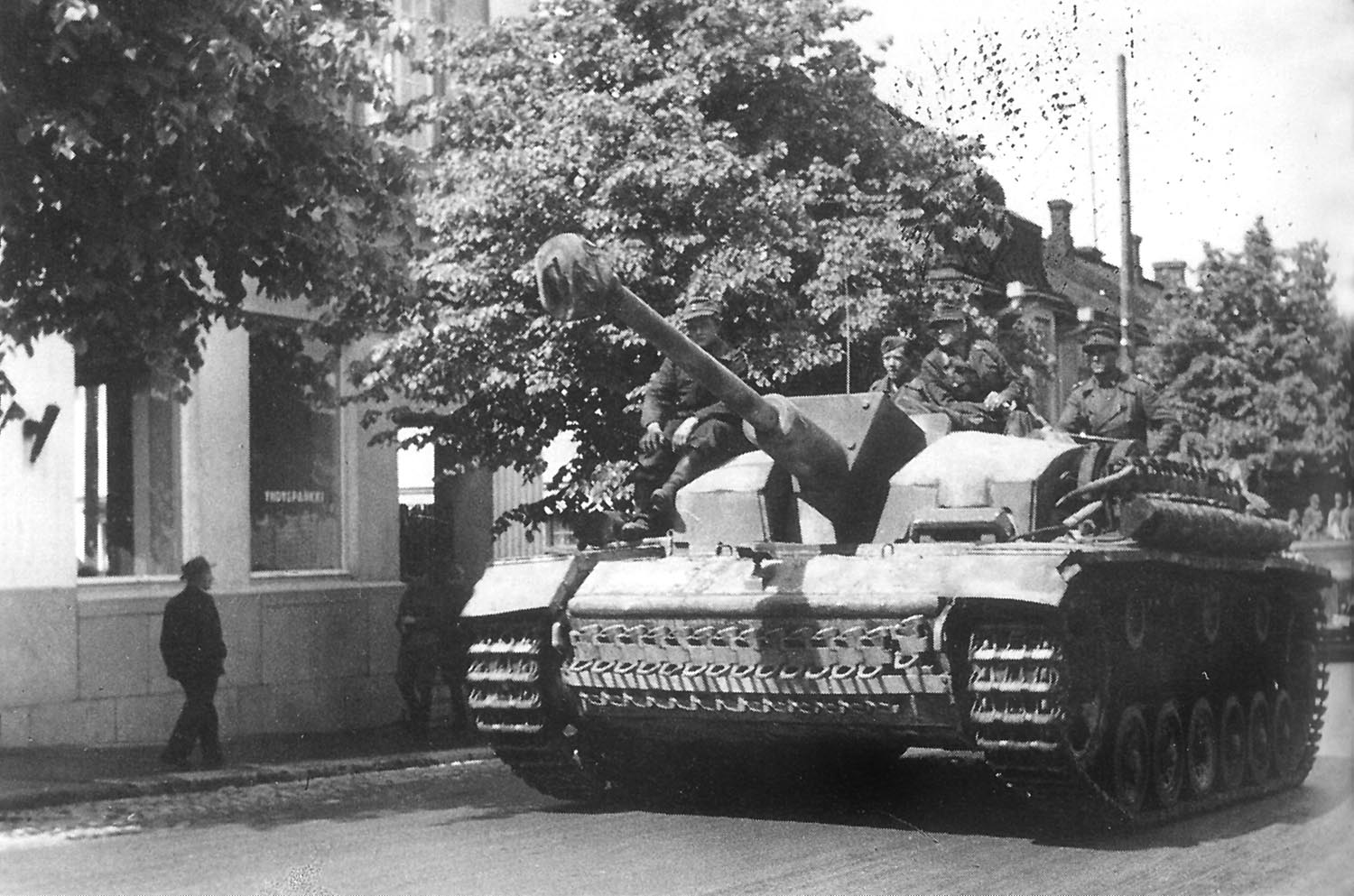
German StuG III Ausf.F/8 in Finland showing concrete armour added to superstructure.

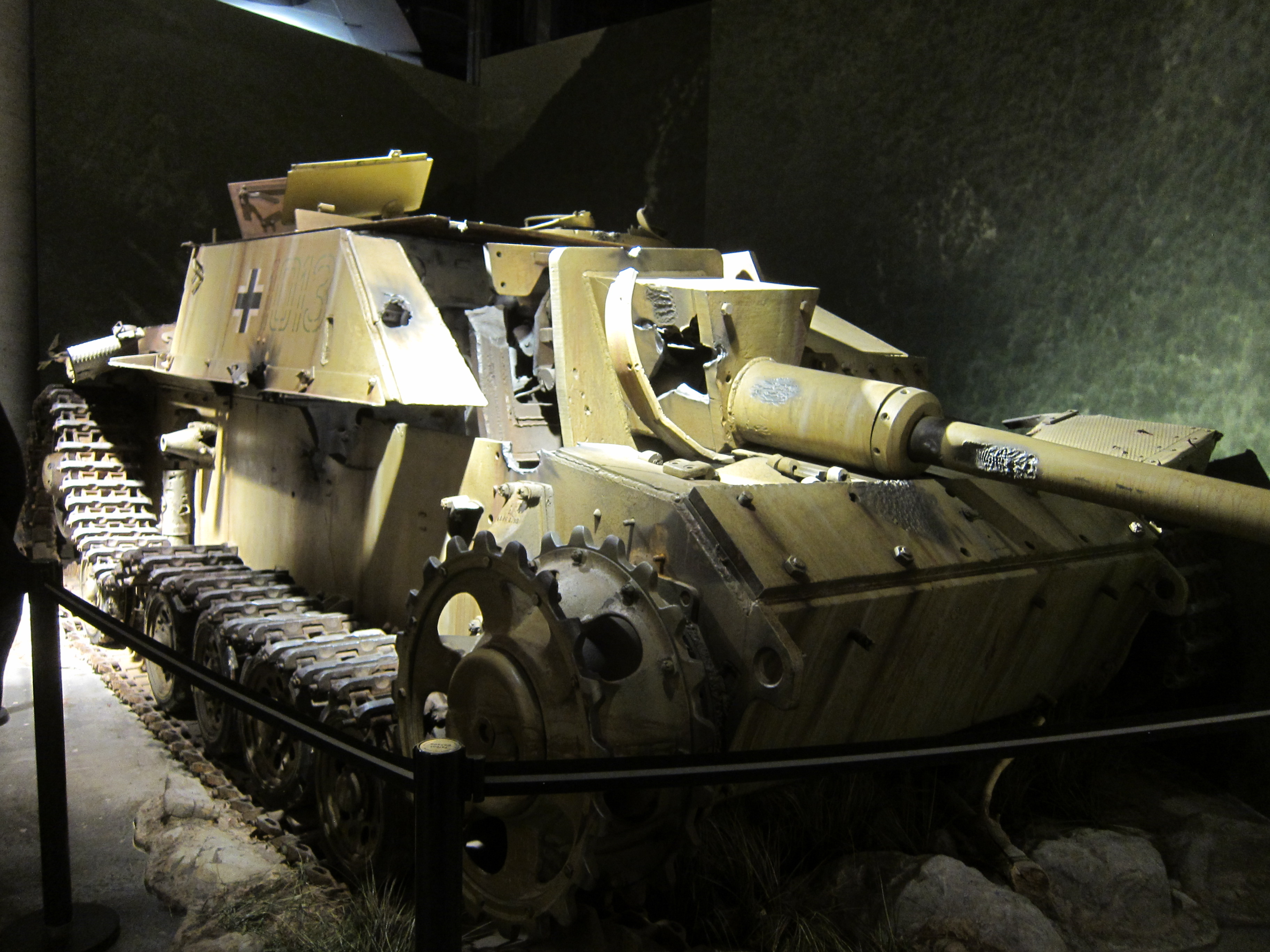
StuG III Ausf.G - Canadian War Museum.

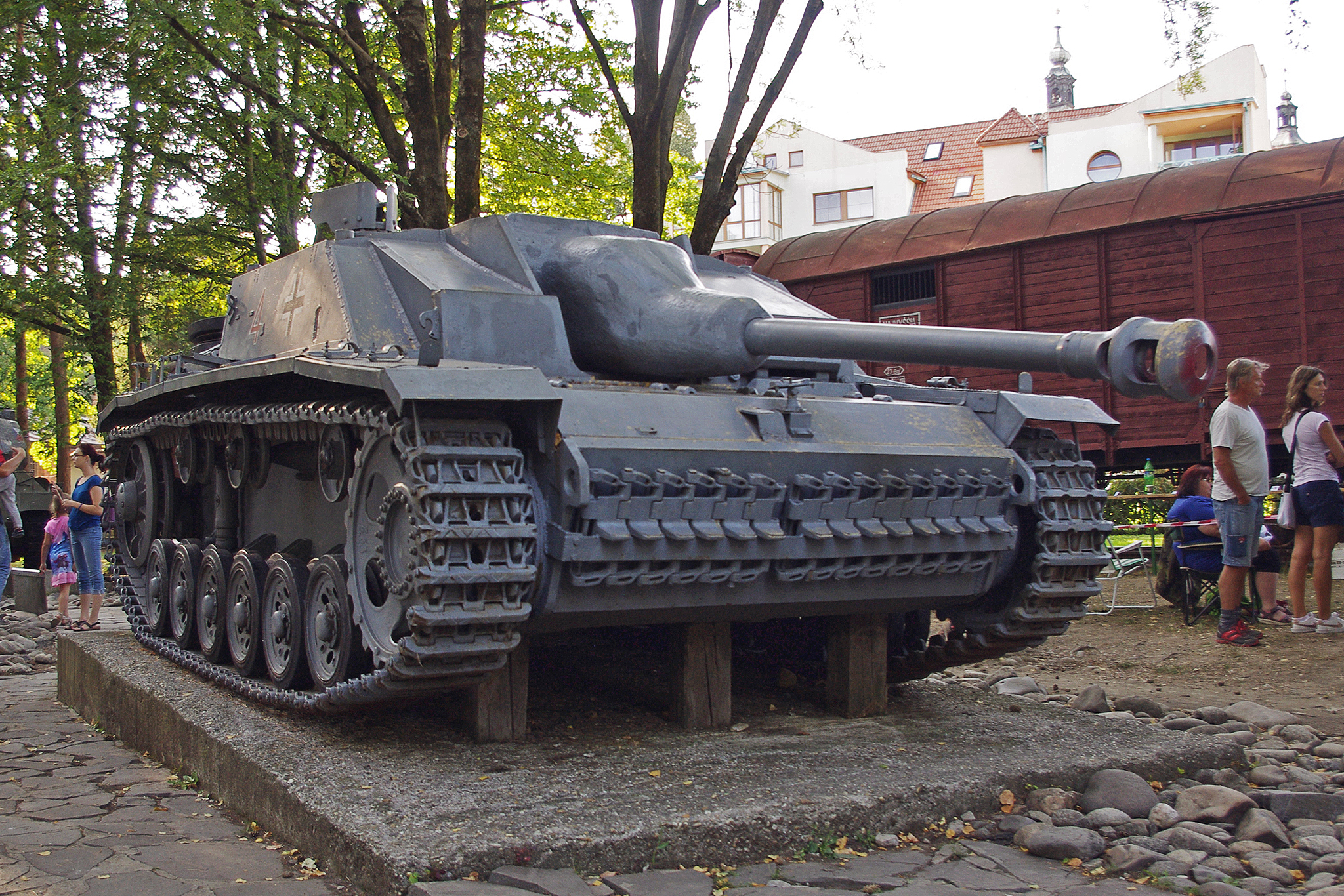
Late production Stug III Ausf. G, Museum of Slovak National Uprising, Slovakia

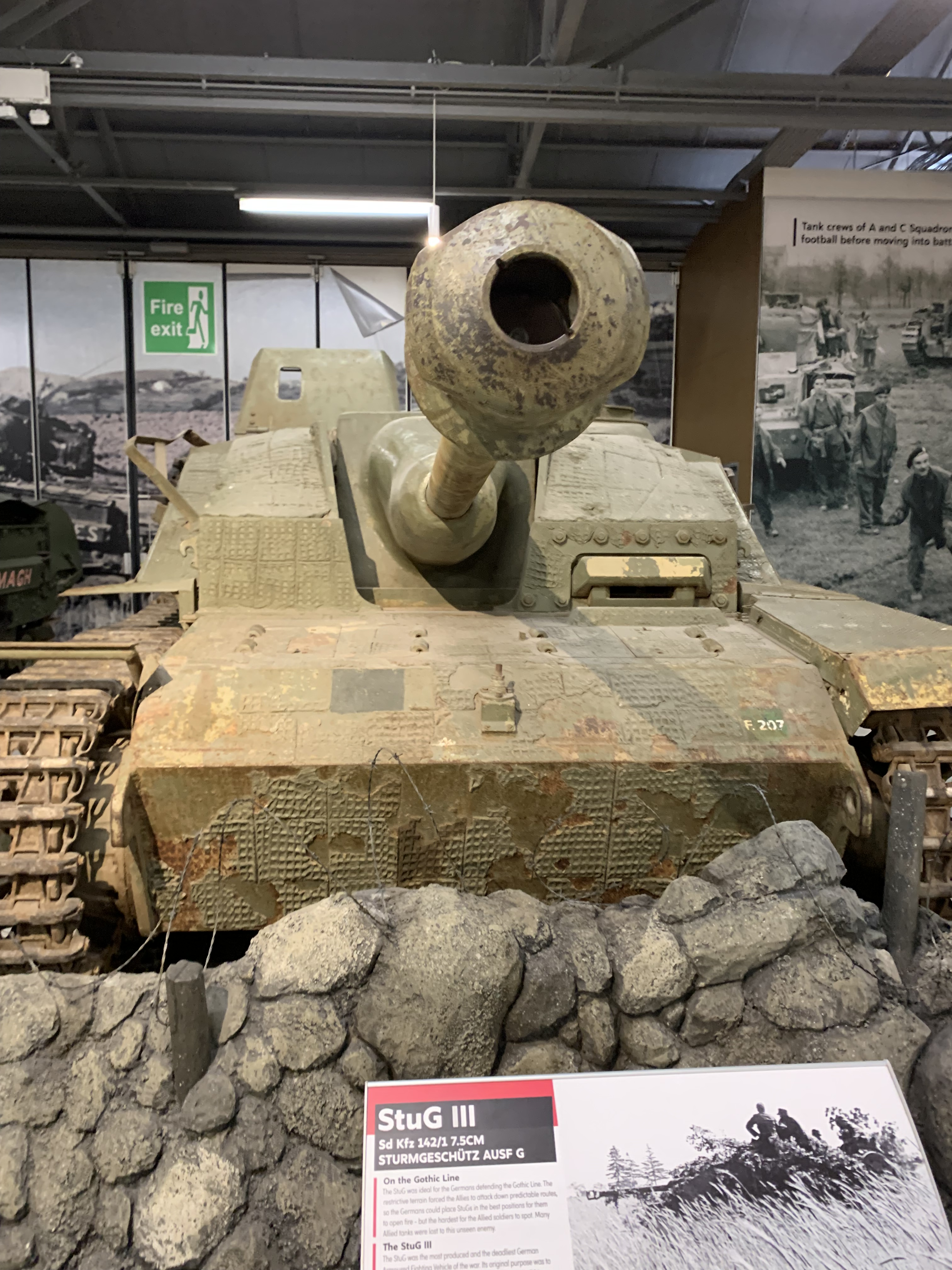
Stug III Sd Kfz 142/1 at the Tank Museum of Bovington, Dorset, UK

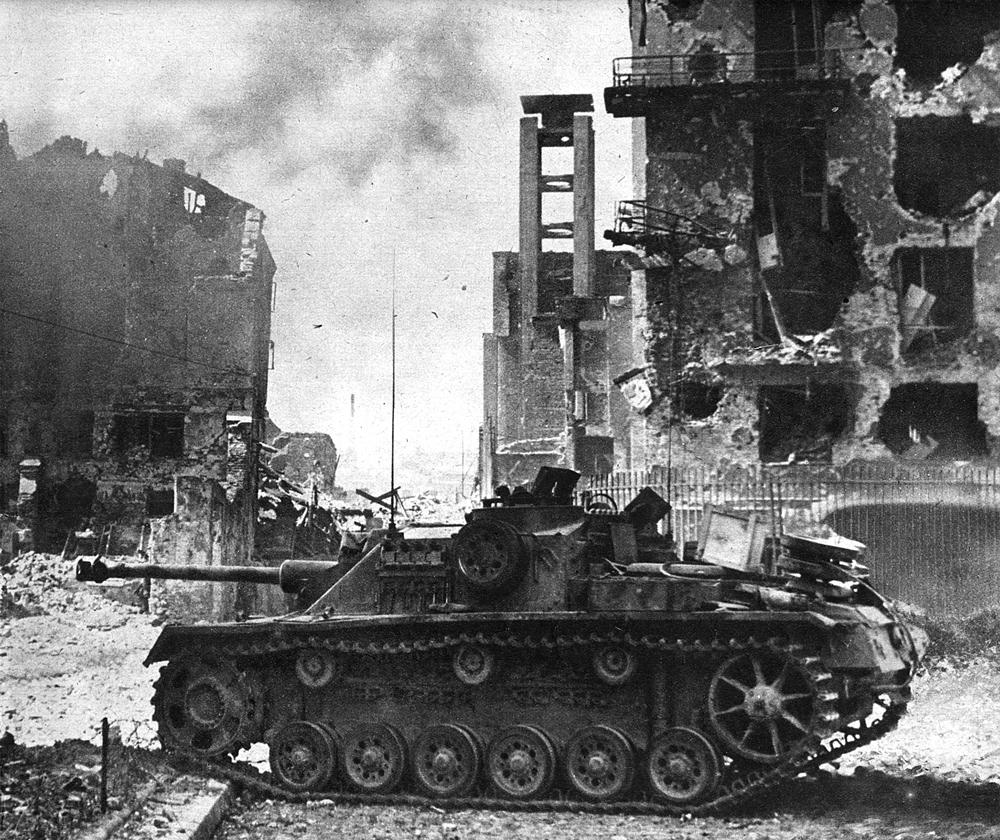
A StuG III in a photograph from the Warsaw Uprising

== Operators ==
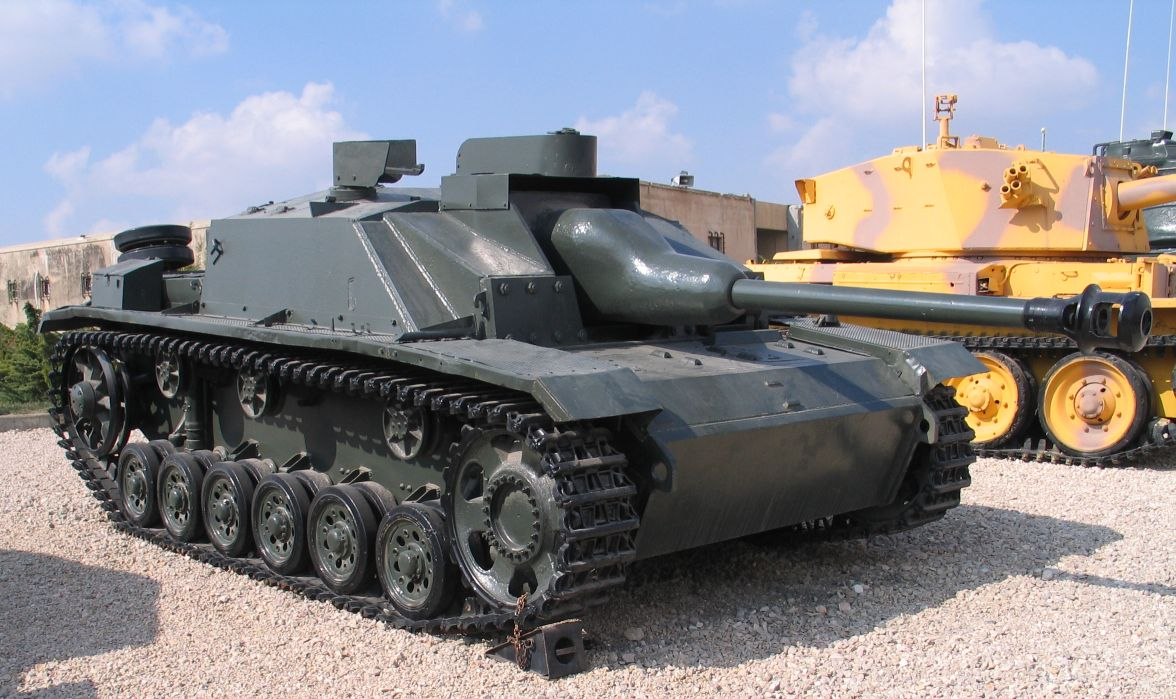
An ex-Syrian Army StuG III Ausf. G on display in Yad La-Shiryon Tank Museum in Latrun, Israel.

- Nazi Germany - Main operator
- Kingdom of Romania - Several hundred supplied by Germany and (postwar) the USSR, referred to as TAs or TAs T-3. All scrapped by 1954.
- Kingdom of Bulgaria - Several supplied by Germany and (postwar) the USSR and all either scrapped or turned into gun emplacements bordering Turkey
- Finland - 30 StuGs, nicknamed "Sturmi", were bought in 1943 and another 29 bought in 1944, all directly from Germany. They were used during the Continuation War against the Soviet Union in 1944.
- Czechoslovakia - Several captured after the war and either scrapped or sold to Syria. One vehicle is on display in Banská Bystrica, Slovakia.
- France - Several captured after the war and briefly operated before being scrapped or sold to Syria
- Kingdom of Hungary - 50 given by Germany in 1944
- Kingdom of Italy - 12 received from Germany in 1943 and assigned to 1st Blackshirt Armoured Division "M"
- Norway - Surrendered German military equipment was used from 1947 to 1951
- Spain - In 1943, Franco's Spain received 10 units and used them until 1954. One Ausf. G remains in drivable condition in the Museo Histórico Militar de Cartagena, Spain
- Sweden - one Ausf. D variant received from Denmark in late 1945 and used for trials and testing of anti-tank mines, and one Ausf. G used for spare parts
- Syria - At least 30 obtained from various states including the Soviet Union, France, Spain and Czechoslovakia during the 1950s
- Soviet Union - Several hundred captured vehicles used for testing and modifications, including the SU-76i assault gun and SG-122 self-propelled howitzer, with some others (very few) fielded for frontline use
- SFR Yugoslavia - Many captured from Germany and its local allies in the Balkans and used up until the 1950s

== Surviving vehicles ==
=== In working order ===
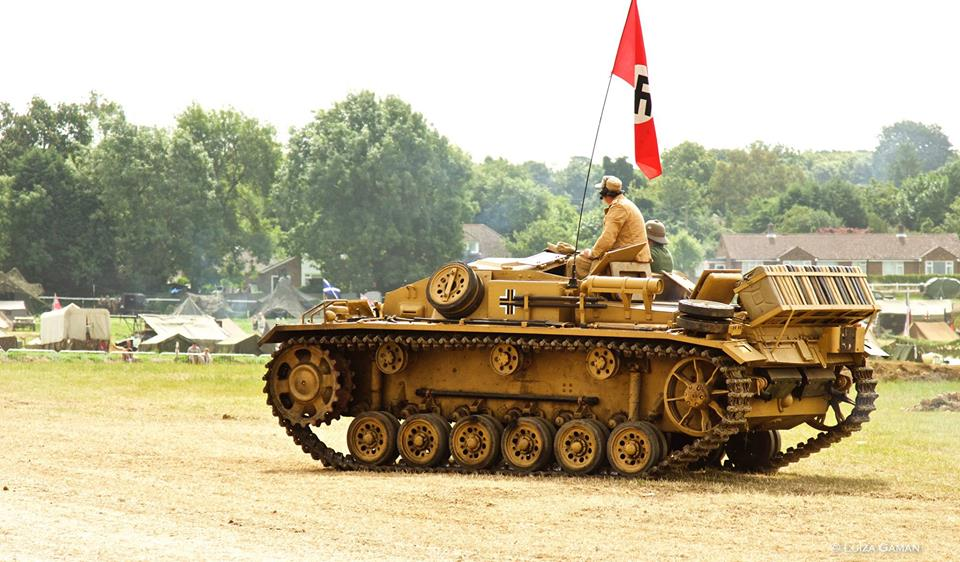
Restored StuG III Ausf. D at 2016 War and Peace Revival, Kent.

- Jon Phillips Private Armor Collection. StuG III Ausf. D. In working order as of 1 July 2016.
- The Weald Foundation, UK. StuG III Ausf. G., October 1943, MIAG, with original HL120 Maybach engine and drive train, and full interior restored. Recovered from Black Sea from the wreck of 'SS Santa Fé'.
- WJHJ Collection, Belgium. StuG III Ausf. G. in full working order with original HL120 Maybach engine and drivetrain.
- Parola Tank Museum, Finland. One StuG III Ausf. G. in museum area and one in storage.
- Histórico Militar de Cartagena, Spain. One StuG III Ausf. G in museum area.
- Bastogne Barracks, Belgium. One StuG III Ausf. F/8
- American Heritage Museum, USA. One StuG III Ausf. G
- Schweizerisches Militärmuseum Full, Switzerland, 1 Ausf. G.
- Deutsches Panzermuseum, Munster, Germany. One Ausf. G
- WTD 41, Germany. One Ausf. G.
- The Artillery, Engineer and Signals Museum of Finland, One Ausf. G.
- Patriot Park, Kubinka, Russia. One StuH 42.
- The Australian Armour and Artillery Museum One mostly matching Ausf G finished in June 2025; restoration documented on YouTube

=== Intact, but not in working order ===
- Musée des Blindés, Saumur France. Two StuG IIIs, a StuG III Ausf. G and a StuH 42.
- The Australian Armour and Artillery Museum Two StuG IIIs - Ausf A (the only remaining Ausf A), Ausf G, and Ausf. F. And as of March-2024 Ausf. B
- Kubinka Tank Museum, Russia. Ausf.G
- Yad La-Shiryon Tank Museum, Israel. One StuG III Ausf. G.
- Belgrade Military Museum, Serbia. One StuG III Ausf. F/8.
- The Wheatcroft Collection Four Ausf. G (2 being restored).
- The Tank Museum, Bovington Camp, UK. Two Ausf. G, one is a Finnish StuG III with Zimmerit, concrete armour, and logs for unditching.
- Parola Tank Museum, Finland. Two StuG III Ausf. G in museum area and three in storage. One cut open so public can see interior. Also 16 in various locations around Finland.
- Museum of the Great Patriotic War, Moscow, Russia. Ausf.G
- Museum of Slovak National Uprising, Banská Bystrica, Slovakia. Stug III Ausf. G, late production variant.
- Arsenalen Tank Museum, Strängnäs, Sweden. One StuG III Ausf. D.
- Bundeswehr Military History Museum (Militärhistorisches Museum der Bundeswehr), Dresden, Germany. One StuG III Ausf. G.
- National Museum of Military History, Sofia, Bulgaria. Two Ausf. G
- Parque y Centro de Mantenimiento de Sistemas Acorazados (PCMASA) nº 2 Segovia, Spain, 1 Ausf. G
- Brigada de Infantería Acorazada "Guadarrama" XII (BRIAC XII), Spain, 1 Ausf. G.
- Brigada de Caballería “CASTILLEJOS II”, Spain, 1 Ausf. G.
- Estonian Military Museum, Estonia, Tallinn. StuG III Ausf. G.
- Overloon War Museum, Overloon, Netherlands. One StuG III Ausf. G.
- Memorial to the Heroes of Volokolamsk Who Died During the Second World War, Moscow Oblast, Russia. One Ausf. D.
- Patriot Park, Kubinka, Russia. One Ausf. F/8 and Two Ausf. G (One is a wreck).
- Forsvarsmuseet Oslo Storage, Trandum, Norway. One Ausf. G.
- Steve Lamonby Collection, UK. One Ausf. G.
- Tey Vehicle Restorations, UK. One Ausf. G.
- WTD 91, Germany. One Ausf. G.
- Motor Technica Museum, Bad Oeynhausen, Germany. One Ausf. E.
- Auto + Technik Museum, Sinsheim, Germany. One Ausf. G.
- Artillerie Schule, Idar Obenstein, Germany. One Ausf. G.
- War Museum for Peace "Diego de Henriquez", Trieste, Italy. One Ausf. G.
- Castiglion Fiorentino, Italy. One Ausf. G.
- MUMA. Museum of Tanks, Madrid, Spain. One Ausf. G.
- General Military Academy, Zaragoza, Spain. One Ausf. G.
- Finnish Armoured Brigade's Garrison, Parola, Finland. Three Ausf G.
- Military Museum of Manège, Helsinki, Finland. One Ausf. G.
- Savon Prikaati Garrison, Mikkeli, Finland. One Ausf. G.
- Hiukkavaara Garrison, Oulu, Finland. One Ausf. G.
- Maasotakoulu, Lappeenranta, Finland. One Ausf. G.
- Hamina, Finland. One Ausf. G.
- Kuljetusvarikko, Tampere, Finland. One Ausf. G.
- Karelia Brigade, Vekaranjarvi, Finland. One Ausf. G.
- Panssarivarikko, Ilveskallio, Finland. One Ausf. G.
- Säkylä Winter War and Continuation War Museum, Finland. One Ausf. G.
- Sovintovaara, Finland. One Ausf. G.
- SdKfz Team Poland, One Ausf. G.
- Stalin Line Museum, Minsk Region, Belarus. One Ausf. G superstructure and main gun.
- Museum Of Combat Glory, Yambol, Bulgaria. One Ausf. G.
- Khmeimim Air Base, Near Lattaquie, Syria. One Ausf. G.
- The Royal Tank Museum, Jordan. One Ausf. G.
- Muzey Tekhniki Vadima Zadorozhnogo, Moscow Oblast, Russia. Three Ausf. G.
- Museum Of Military Equipment "Battle Glory Of The Urals", Sverdlovsk Oblast, Russia. One Ausf. G.
- Victory Park (Saratov), Saratov Oblast, Russia. One Ausf. G.
- U.S. Army Armor & Cavalry Collection, Georgia, USA. Two Ausf. G.
- Patton Museum Of Cavalry And Armor, Kentucky, USA. One Ausf. G.

=== StuH 42s ===
- Musée Des Blindés, Saumur, France.
- Australian Armour And Artillery Museum, Cairns, Australia.
- U.S. Army Armor & Cavalry Collection, Georgia, USA. Two late production versions.
- US Army Artillery Museum, Oklahoma, USA.
- White Eagle Museum, Skarżysko-Kamienna, Poland. One wreck.

== See also ==
- Panzerjäger

=== Vehicles of comparable role, performance and era ===
- American M10 GMC
- German Hetzer, and Jagdpanzer IV
- Italian Semovente da 75/34 and Semovente da 75/46
- Romanian Mareșal
- Soviet SU-85
- Hungarian 44M Zrínyi I

== Sources ==
- Anderson, Thomas. Sturmgeschütz: Panzer, Panzerjäger, Waffen-SS and Luftwaffe Units 1943–45. Osprey Publishing, 2017. ISBN 978-1-4728-1752-5
- Anderson, Thomas. Vorwärts Immer, Rückwärts Nimmer!: An Illustrated Guide to History and Fate of the German Assault Artillery in WW II. History Facts, 2011. ISBN 978-3-9522968-9-9
- Baxter, Ian. German Armored Warfare of World War II. Casemate, 2003.
- Gudmundsson, Bruce I. On Artillery. Bloomsbury Publishing, 1993. ISBN 0-27594-673-8
- Jentz, Thomas L., Doyle, Hilary Louis. Panzer Production from 1933 to 1945 Panzer Tracts, 2011.
- Mueller, Peter; Zimmermann, Wolfgang. Sturmgeschütz III - Backbone of the German Infantry. Archived from the original on 25 December 2008.
- Military Intelligence Service (25 November 1942). Artillery in the Desert. Special Series No. 6. Department of War, Washington, DC. – via LoneSentry.com.
- Scafes, Cornel I; Scafes, Ioan I; Serbanescu, Horia Vl (2005). Trupele Blindate din Armata Romana 1919-1947. Editura Oscar Print.
- "Sturmgeschütz III, StuIG33B, Sturmhaubitze 42" (PDF). Surviving Panzers. 14 April 2023.
- Spielberger, Walter J. Sturmgeschütz & Its Variants. Schiffer Publishing, 1993. ISBN 0-88740-398-0
- War Department. Handbook on German Military Forces, Technical Manual (TM)-E-30-451, 1945.
- Zaloga, Steven J. German Tanks in Barbarossa 1941. Osprey Publishing, 2025. ISBN 978-1-4728-6437-6
- Zaloga, Steven J. M10 Tank Destroyer vs StuG III Assault Gun: Germany 1944. Osprey Publishing, 2013. ISBN 978-1-78096-099-9
