= Hop Farm =

Country park in Kent, England

- Oast Houses at The Hop Farm

- Location within Kent
- Location: Beltring
- Coordinates: 51°12′07″N 0°23′45″E

The Hop Farm is a 400-acre (1.6 km^{2}) Country Park in Beltring, near East Peckham in the English county of Kent. The farm is over 450 years old and has the largest collection of oast houses in the world.

== History ==
Hops have been grown on the farm since at least the 16th century. It was purchased in 1574 by William Lambarde who transferred the farm's ownership the following year to the Worshipful Company of Drapers, with the intention that the rental from the farm should be used to help fund a set of almshouses in Greenwich which he had established. The farm remained in the ownership of the Drapers' Company for over 300 years and became a major producer of hops for the brewing industry, in particular supplying Whitbread.

During the late 19th century the farm was rented by Edward White, described as the "father of the hop industry" and as a "legend" in the industry. He expanded the farm and was influential in developing new varieties of hop, including the White Golding which was used extensively by Whitbread. When White retired in 1920 the farm was sold to the brewery, the first time it had changed ownership in more than 300 years. It was managed by John Waghorn, described as "as much a legend as the master before him".

The farm remained in Whitbread's ownership until 1997, gradually becoming known The Whitbread Hop Farm. It originally remained as a working farm, although the brewery opened it up to visitors as early as the 1930s. As Whitbread were seeking to move out of the brewing trade, they began looking for new owners in the 1990s.

In 1997, Mohamed Al-Fayed wanted to buy The Hop Farm to stable his shire horses, and another rival wanted it for a rare breeds centre, but Brent and Fiona Pollard were successful in their purchase, at a cost of 2 million pounds, beating their nearest rival by £5,000. Unfortunately the business was in trouble; turnover was around £700,000 a year and in 1995 losses were £1.5 million. In their first year the Pollards reduced staff from 50 to 14 and suffered a drought, floods, a gas pipeline installation and the outbreak of foot and mouth disease. However they broke even, and in subsequent years their profits grew. In 2006, The Hop Farm was sold to Kent Attractions Ltd and in 2007 sold again to Peter Bull. In 2012, The Hop Farm underwent radical management restructure in an effort to halt a five-year slide in visitor numbers, however in 2013 the company went into liquidation. It was rescued by another company from within The Hop Farm group.

== Events ==
The Red Dragon Monster Truck at The Hop Farm

The main event was the annual War and Peace Show. First put on in 1982, it had grown to be the largest military vehicle show in the world, with 10,000 enthusiasts and over 3,500 vehicles attending. It moved to Folkestone Race Course in 2012, after the organiser became unhappy with the Hop Farm owners. The show has been cancelled for the foreseeable future.

In addition to this, the park hosts a number of events such as European Championship Monster Truck Racing, The Kent County Fair, and Paws in the Park (It has since moved to the Kent Showground Detling).

The Hop Farm is also an outdoor music venue. In 2006 a concert starring Craig David should have launched the Tunbridge Wells SpaFest, to mark the 400th anniversary of the founding of the town but it was called off due to local complaints, and a substitute concert was staged at The Hop Farm. That year also saw Terry Wogan's Summer Proms staged there.

Over the first weekend of July between 2008 and 2012, the Hop Farm Festival was held at the park. Starting in 2008, the festival grew to a capacity of over 50,000 people, playing host to many internationally artists including Bob Dylan, Prince, The Eagles, Blondie, Neil Young, Primal Scream, The Fratellis and Florence and the Machine among others, but after making a loss in 2012, the festival was cancelled in 2013 due to poor ticket sales. Since 2015 the park has been the location of Chilled in a Field Festival.

== Bibliography ==
- Carlaw, Derek (2020). Kent County Cricketers, A to Z: Part One (1806–1914) (PDF). Cardiff: ACS.
