= Will Varley =

English singer-songwriter, musician and visual artist

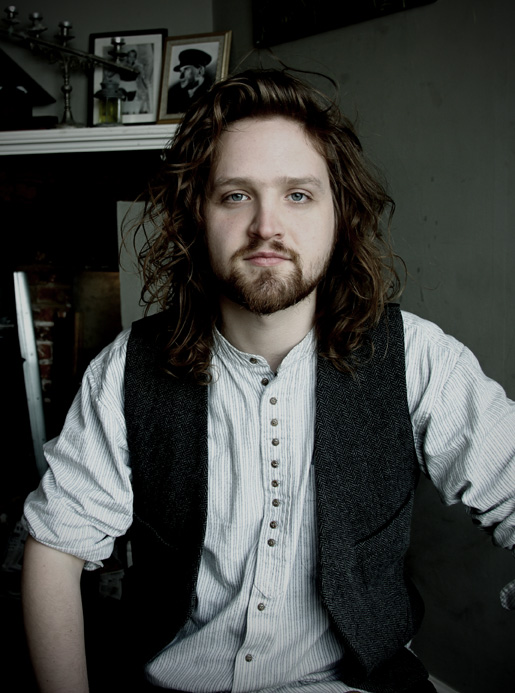

Background information
- Origin: London, England
- Genres: alt country, Folk, Singer Songwriter
- Occupation: Singer-songwriter
- Instruments: Guitar, Vocals
- Labels: MNRK Music Group, Yellow Cake, Xtra Mile Recordings, Smugglers Records
- Website: http://www.willvarley.com/

Will Varley (born 7 March 1987) is an English singer-songwriter, musician and visual artist. He is one of the founding members of the arts collective Smugglers Records. Since self releasing his debut album Advert Soundtracks in 2011 he has toured extensively across the world as a headline act and opened for the likes of Billy Bragg, Valerie June, and The Proclaimers. He has headlined venues including Union Chapel and Shepherd's Bush Empire. Will’s songs have been covered by acts as diverse as The Pretty Things and Frank Turner. In recent years Will has co-written songs with numerous artists including Skin of Skunk Anansie and Shae Dupuy. His sixth studio album The Hole Around My Head was released in 2021.

== History ==
Will Varley began playing open mic nights in London in the early 2000s, setting up his own nights in the Grey Horse, Kingston with friends Tom Farrer and Nick Marks. He was a regular at numerous venues including The Half Moon, Putney and the 12 Bar Club and would often play different open mics seven nights a week. During this time he shared stages with acts including Jamie T, Bastille and The Vaccines. In 2010 he moved to Kent and set up Smugglers Records with the band Cocos Lovers. He released his debut album Advert Soundtracks through his own label in 2011 and toured the album on foot.

In September 2013 his second album As The Crow Flies was released and garnered positive reviews & was described as "Excellent" by Q magazine. The album received airplay on BBC Radio 3, Radio 6 & XFM.

In an interview on BBC Introducing in March 2014, Varley announced he would be embarking on another walking tour in May, this time traveling the entire south coast of England. The Rambling Tour saw Varley walk almost 500 miles with a guitar on his back, playing 24 shows along the way.

During an interview with Steve Lamacq on BBC6 Varley said he was working on new material and was aiming to release a third album in early 2015.

On 29 March 2015 Varley signed a record deal with Xtra Mile Recordings while backstage at The Royal Albert Hall shortly before taking to the stage to open for Frank Turner. A new digital only EP Will Varley Live at The Lighthouse was released in May 2015 to coincide with Varley's spring tour of the UK. The EP reached number 19 in the iTunes singer/songwriter chart and national radio play from XFM's John Kennedy. Soon after the record was released it was announced that Varley would be supporting The Proclaimers on thirteen dates across the UK.

Varley's third album Postcards from Ursa Minor was released on Xtra Mile Recordings on 30 October 2015. The Independent described it as a "gem of a record". The album reached number 11 in the Official Independent Album Breakers Chart. The album's lead single, "Seize the Night", was played on BBC Radio 1. The song has since been streamed almost 6 million times on Spotify. It was later included on NPR's Austin 100 list for the annual SXSW festival.

Following the album release, Varley toured the UK and Germany with Frank Turner and shortly afterwards began his own headline tour of the UK, finishing with a sell-out show at London's Scala. A week later he began a tour of North America supporting Skinny Lister. The tour began with a show on the Salty Dog Cruise from Miami to The Bahamas curated by Flogging Molly.

In April 2016, Varley announced he would be doing a further twenty-five shows with The Proclaimers over the summer, and three shows opening for Billy Bragg. He also appeared at numerous UK festivals including Bestival, Cambridge Folk Festival and Glastonbury Festival.

In September it was announced that Kingsdown Sundown, Varley's 4th studio album, would be released on 4 November 2016. The album reached number 26 in the Official Independent Album Charts. Over the Autumn Varley embarked on further tours of North America, Ireland, Germany and the UK including a sold-out show at Union Chapel, Islington.

Throughout the Spring of 2017 Varley toured Europe opening for Valerie June and the US extensively, opening for Frank Turner, William Elliott Whitmore and Lincoln Durham. While on stage at Glastonbury Festival 2017, Varley played two brand new songs and said he was working on new material for an album. On 4 July during an interview with Huw Stevens on BBC Radio 1 the head of Xtra Mile Recordings, Charlie Caplowe, stated that the label were planning on releasing a new Varley album in Autumn 2017.

On 9 February 2018 The Spirit of Minnie was released on Xtra Mile Recordings, reaching number two in the iTunes Singer Songwriter charts in the UK, number three in Germany and making the top 30 in the US. The album was produced by legendary record producer Cameron McVey and mastered by Frank Arkwright at Abbey Road Studios, London. It differs from previous Varley albums as it was recorded with a full band. The UK leg of the album tour culminated with a show at London's 2000 capacity Shepherd's Bush Empire.

The album's lead single "Seven Days" was featured on Channel 4's Sunday Brunch. The album was reviewed favourably, with The Times describing Varley as being at his "Lyrical Best" and Clash Magazine saying the album "Evokes the likes of Bright Eyes, Springsteen and Dylan effortlessly."

A week later Varley began a three-week tour of the US opening for label mates Skinny Lister, before returning to Europe in April for a headline tour, selling out shows across Germany and The Netherlands. May 2018 saw Varley and his band in residence with John Kennedy at Radio X, recording live tracks at Radio X Studios, London which were broadcast nationally over the following week.

In July 2018 Varley was invited to perform at Fairport Convention’s Cropredy festival by members of the original band. This marked his biggest show to date, performing in front of some 10,000 festival attendees. That summer he also made appearances at Bearded Theory Festival, Green Man, and his own Smugglers Festival, amongst others.

In Autumn 2018 Varley self released his first live album Live at Shepherds Bush Empire. The album was well received and has been streamed on Spotify over half a million times since its release. Autumn also saw Varley opening for The Proclaimers again in the UK and touring the UK and Europe as a headline act, selling out numerous shows across the UK, Germany, Netherlands, Denmark, Switzerland and Austria. During this tour Varley also played his first ever shows in Poland, Italy and France.

In March 2019 during his showcase at Stephen F's Hotel in Austin, TX Varley announced he had parted ways with Xtra Mile Recordings. In June 2019 Varley embarked on his first headline tour of the US, playing 11 shows across the Midwest and the East Coast, including sold out shows in New York, Boston and Wisconsin.

In September 2019 Varley said on social media that he had been working on new material and would be playing new songs at an intimate show at the 200 capacity London venue, The Lexington in November. The show sold out in 90 minutes.

On May 26, 2021, Will Varley put out The Hole Around My Head his first new single since 2018. An album of the same name was released on October 22, reaching number 20 in the UK’s official Folk and Americana charts.

== Discography ==
- Advert Soundtracks (June 2011)
  - 1. The Sound of the Markets Crashing
  - 2. King for a King
  - 3. Advert Soundtrack
  - 4. Newborn
  - 5. I Lost My Mind in Soho
  - 6. These Are The Days
  - 7. I Still Think of You Sometimes
  - 8. A Monkey on a Rock
  - 9. The Flood
  - 10. Zetlands
- As the Crow Flies (September 2013)
  - 1. Where The Wild Wind Blows
  - 2. Blood And Bone
  - 3. Weddings And Wars
  - 4. As The Crow Flies
  - 5. I Got This Email
  - 6. She's Been Drinking
  - 7. When You're Gone
  - 8. Until The Grass Gets Greener
  - 9. The Self Checkout Shuffle
  - 10. Down The Well
  - 11. Soldiers on the Wall
- Live at the Lighthouse EP (May 2015)
  - 1. Weddings and Wars
  - 2. From Halcyon
  - 3. We Don't Believe You
  - 4. King for a King
  - 5. I Got This Email
- Postcards from Ursa Minor (October 2015)
  - 1. As for My Soul
  - 2. The Man Who Fell To Earth
  - 3. Seize The Night.
  - 4. Outside Over There
  - 5. This House
  - 6. Talking Cat Blues
  - 7. From Halcyon
  - 8. Dark Days Away
  - 9. Send My Love to the System
  - 10. The Endlessness and the Space Between
  - 11. Concept of Freedom
  - 12. Is Anyone Out There
  - 13. The Question of Passing Time
- Kingsdown Sundown (November 2016)
  - 1. To Build A Wall
  - 2. Something Is Breaking
  - 3. When She Wakes Up
  - 4. February Snow
  - 5. Let Your Guard Down
  - 6. We Want Our Planet Back
  - 7. Too Late Too Soon
  - 8. Wild Bird
  - 9. Back To Hell
  - 10. One Last Look at the View
  - 11. We'll Keep Making Plans
- Spirit of Minnie (February 2018)
  - 1. All Those Stars
  - 2. Seven Days
  - 3. Screenplays
  - 4. Breaking The Bread
  - 5. Statues
  - 6. Spirit of Minnie
  - 7. Let It Slide
  - 8. The Postman (about Ferdinand Cheval)
  - 9. Insect
- The Hole Around My Head (October 2021)
  - 1. Somers Town
  - 2. Colour TV
  - 3. Dreamland
  - 4. Love In The New World
  - 5. The Hole Around My Head
  - 6. Must Be Time For Moving On
  - 7. Candles For The Dead
  - 8. Her Own Private Universe
  - 9. Live Again
  - 10. Pushing Against Us
  - 11. The Lonely & The Brave
- Machines Will Never Learn To Make Mistakes Like Me (May 2025)
  - 1. Long Way Back to Now
  - 2. Different Man
  - 3. Home Before the World Ends
  - 4. Never Get Tired of Loving You
  - 5. End Times
  - 6. Machines Will Never Learn to Make Mistakes Like Me
  - 7. Only Louise
  - 8. Venus Returns
  - 9. Everything Has a Heartbeat
  - 10. Whatever’s Left
