= Chilled in a Field Festival =

Music festival in England

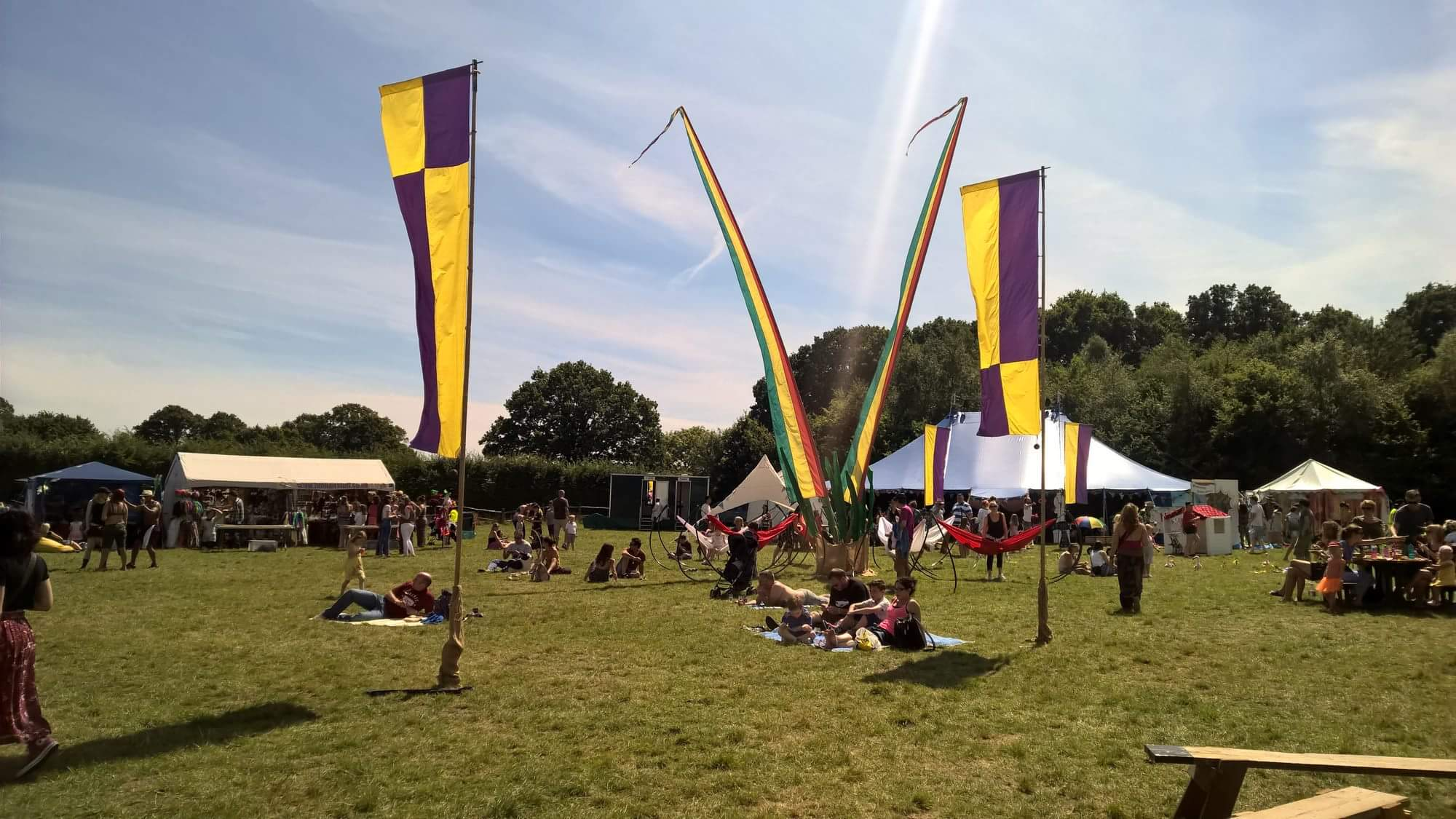
- Sunday afternoon at the festival
- Status: active
- Genre: Dance, folk, rock, indie
- Frequency: Annual (Last weekend July)
- Locations: Bentley, Sussex, England
- Years active: 16
- Inaugurated: 2010
- Most recent: 26 July 2019 – 28 July 2019
- Attendance: 1,500 (2015)
- Website: www.chilledinafieldfestival.co.uk

Chilled in a Field Festival is a small, family-friendly music festival in the United Kingdom. First run in 2010, in 2014 it was listed by The Guardian as one of their "Top 25 summer festivals for music and arts lovers, foodies and families", and given a Gold Award by the family festival review website Festival Kidz. The festival now draws an attendance of 1,500+, having grown from an attendance of only 120 people in its first year.

The festival was first held in Hawkhurst, Kent, and has also been held at The Hop Farm Country Park in Paddock Wood. and at Bentley Wildfowl and Motor Museum in Sussex. Bands headlining the festival have included The Egg, Cocos Lovers, She Drew The Gun, and Tankus the Henge. The festival was most recently held in 2019. As of 2022 it is on indefinite hiatus as the result of financial difficulties arising from missing 2020 and 2021 due to the COVID-19 pandemic.
