= Lionel White (cricketer) =

English cricketer

Personal information
- Full name: Lionel Algernon White
- Born: 9 November 1850; Wateringbury, Kent
- Died: 25 June 1917 (aged 66); Tunbridge Wells, Kent
- Batting: Right-handed
- Relatives: Edward White (cousin)

Domestic team information
- Years: Team
- 1869: Kent
- FC debut: 12 July 1869 Kent v Sussex
- Last FC: 23 August 1869 Kent v Surrey

Career statistics
Competition	First-class
Matches	4
Runs scored	84
Batting average	10.50
100s/50s	0/0
Top score	34
Catches/stumpings	1/–
- Source: CricInfo, 29 June 2014

Lionel Algernon White (9 November 1850 – 25 June 1917) was an English soldier and cricketer who played four first-class cricket matches for Kent County Cricket Club in 1869. He served in the British Army between 1869 and 1892, retiring with the rank of lieutenant colonel.

== Early life ==
White was born at Wateringbury near Maidstone in Kent in 1850, the son of Thomas White and his wife Louisa (née Winton). His father ran a 174 acres (70 ha) farm at Wateringbury and Lionel was educated at St Pauls School in London where he played cricket in the school XI, captaining the team in 1868.

== Cricket ==
A right-handed batsman, White made his first-class debut for Kent against Sussex in early July 1869, opening the batting. He recorded a duck in his first innings, but scored 34 runs in his second, his highest first-class score. He played against Nottinghamshire towards the end of the month and appeared twice for the Gentlemen of Kent in minor matches, before playing in two other top-level matches for Kent during August, first against Nottinghamshire and then, in Kent's final match of the season, against Surrey. White scored 84 runs in his four matches and took one catch; he did not bowl.

== Military service ==
White joined the 53rd (Shropshire) Regiment of Foot in 1869, his service in the military effectively ending his top-class cricket career. He was commissioned as a second lieutenant, rising to the rank of lieutenant in 1871. He served in the later stages of the Anglo-Zulu War of 1879 in the Commissariat and Transport Department and, after being promoted to the rank of captain in 1880, in the Soudan Expedition during 1885 with the 1st Battalion, King's Shropshire Light Infantry. He was promoted to major later in 1885 and retired with the honorary rank of lieutenant colonel in 1892. Much of his military service was spent in the Caribbean.

During his military service White was able to play some cricket. In 1872 he scored a century for a team of St Pauls old boys against the school XI and in 1880 he played matches whilst stationed in Cheshire.

== Later life and family ==
White married Florence Astwood at Roath in Cardiff in 1880; the couple had two daughters. He retired to Tunbridge Wells where he died June 1917 at the age of 66. His cousin Edward White was also a first-class cricketer who played 29 times for Kent between 1867 and 1875. The cousins appeared together in the final two Kent matches Lionel White played in as well as in one match for the Gentlemen of Kent.

== Bibliography ==
- Carlaw, Derek (2020). Kent County Cricketers, A to Z: Part One (1806–1914) (PDF). Cardiff: ACS.
