= Edward White (cricketer) =

English cricketer (1844–1922)

Personal information
- Full name: Edward Albert White
- Born: 16 March 1844; Yalding, Kent
- Died: 3 May 1922 (aged 78); Chiswick, Middlesex
- Batting: Right-handed
- Role: Batsman
- Relatives: Lionel White (cousin)

Domestic team information
- Years: Team
- 1867–1875: Kent
- FC debut: 6 June 1867 Kent v Sussex
- Last FC: 31 May 1875 Kent v Surrey

Career statistics
Competition	First-class
Matches	31
Runs scored	827
Batting average	15.60
100s/50s	0/2
Top score	81
Catches/stumpings	12/–
- Source: CricInfo, 3 November 2023

Edward Albert White (16 March 1844 – 3 May 1922) was an English farmer and cricketer. He was influential in the development of the hop farming industry in Kent and owned the largest hop farm in the United Kingdom towards the end of the 19th century. He played first-class cricket between 1867 and 1875, mainly for Kent County Cricket Club.

== Early life ==
White was born at Yalding in Kent in 1844, the son of Alfred White and his wife Mary (née Winton). His family owned a 776 acres (314 ha) farm at Nettlestead which employed over 60 workers. White was educated at Marlborough College, starting at the school in 1857.

== Cricket ==
Despite not being selected to play for his school XI, White played club cricket for The Mote and Town Malling clubs. He played for Gentlemen of Kent regularly between 1865 and 1873, and made his first-class debut for Kent in a June 1867 match against Sussex at Gravesend, opening the batting and scoring 15 runs in his first innings of county cricket.

Described by Wisden as being a "good hitter" who "possessed (a) strong defence", White played a total of 29 times for Kent in first-class matches, making his final appearance for the county in 1875. He also played for the Gentlemen of the South in 1867, and for the South against Marylebone Cricket Club (MCC) in 1872. In his 31 first-class matches, White scored a total of 827 runs, making two half-centuries. His highest score of 81 was made against Surrey at Canterbury in 1871, although he scored 96 runs for the Gentlemen of Kent against the Gentlemen of Sussex in 1866.

== Business and family life ==
Oast houses at the farm at Beltring that White ran

White took over running a 385 acres (156 ha) hop farm at Beltring south-west of Maidstone. The farm was owned by the Drapers' Company and had been a hop farm for over 300 years. By the 1890s he had extended the farm and was employing over 20 men. The farm was at one point the largest hop farm in the United Kingdom, and White became an influential figure in the development of the hop growing industry in the country. The farm was later sold to Whitbreads and was after rebranded as The Hop Farm, becoming a tourist destination.

He was responsible for developing a number of production and processing improvements in the industry and has been called the "Father of the Hop Industry" and a "legend" in the industry. He developed new varieties of hop, including the White Golding, and the company which he established to run the farm in 1894 grew to become a major producer of tree washes for both the hop and fruit growing industries. His work on the use of insecticides in the industry has been described as "pioneering" and he was influential in the Great Oast Demonstration of 1908, calling for protection for the industry from imported hops, and featured on the cover of The Encircling Hop, a 1990 book on the hop industry in Kent.

White married Mary Filder (née Whisson) in 1880. His wife was a widow who already had two children; the couple had two daughters of their own. He retired in 1920 at which time the farm at Beltring was sold and retired to live at Chiswick where he died in 1922 at the age of 78. His cousin Lionel White also played cricket for Kent, making four appearances for them in 1869. The cousins appeared alongside each other in two of these matches as well as once for the Gentlemen of Kent during the same season.

== Bibliography ==
- Carlaw, Derek (2020). Kent County Cricketers, A to Z: Part One (1806–1914) (PDF). Cardiff: ACS.
