= Jon Phillips Armour Collection =

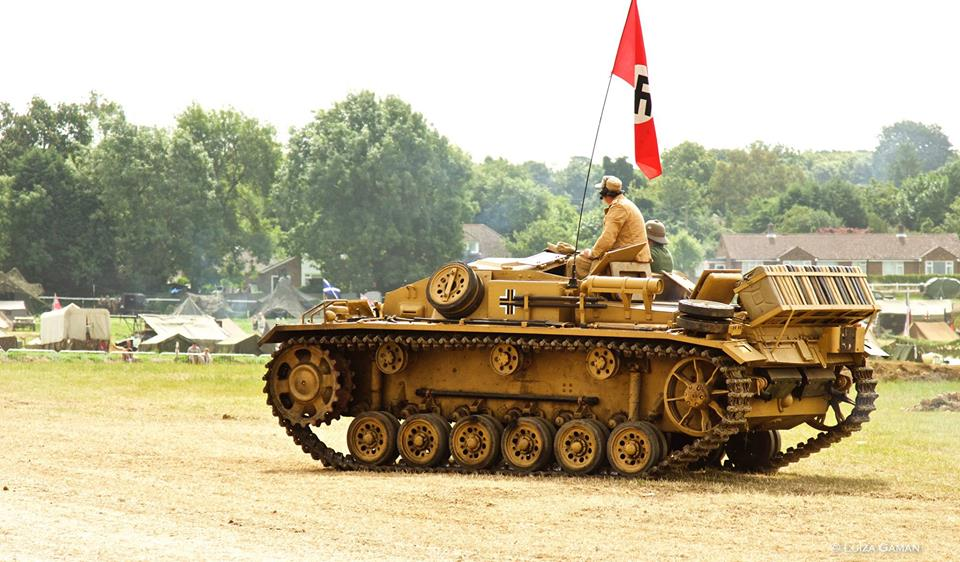
Completed StuG III July 2016

The Jon Phillips Armour Collection is a private collection of armoured vehicles owned by Jon "Welderbeast" Phillips, a mobile welder and World War II vehicle hobbyist from Hoo, England. The collection includes a replica Panzer III Ausf. A, a restored original Sturmgeschütz III Ausf. D, and a restored Volkswagen Schwimmwagen.

== Replicas ==
=== Panzer III Ausf. A replica ===
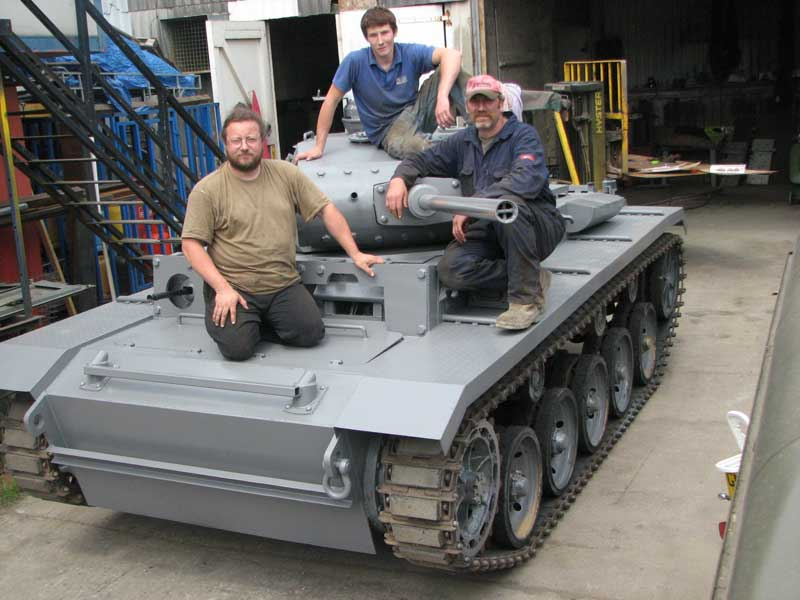
Jon Phillips Panzer III Ausf. A replica

Jon Phillips initially converted an FV 432 armoured personnel carrier chassis combined with a FV101 Scorpion light armoured vehicle turret to produce a replica Panzer III Ausf. A in order to participate in the War and Peace Revival. Construction time was 8 weeks.

=== Marder III Ausf. M restoration ===
In October, 2016, Jon Phillips acquired the parts to a Marder III Ausf. M, which he is currently restoring in his shop. The plan is to convert it to Iveco 6 cylinder turbo diesel engine.

=== StuG III Ausf. G replica ===
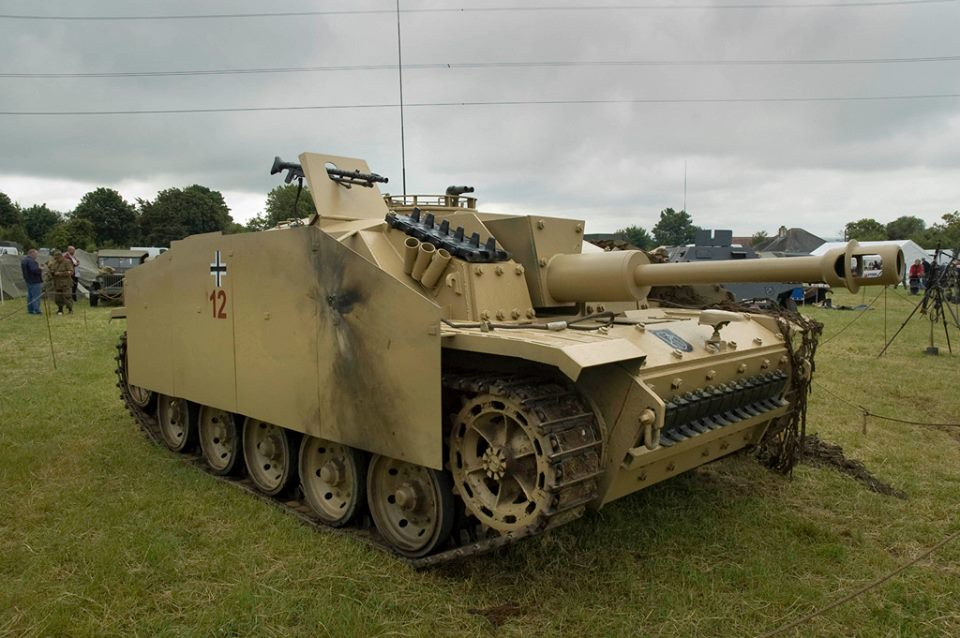
Jon Phillips StuG III Ausf. G replica

In 2008, Jon Phillips produced a replica of a StuG III Ausf. G using the chassis of an FV 432 armoured personnel carrier as a host vehicle.

=== StuG III Ausf. D restoration ===
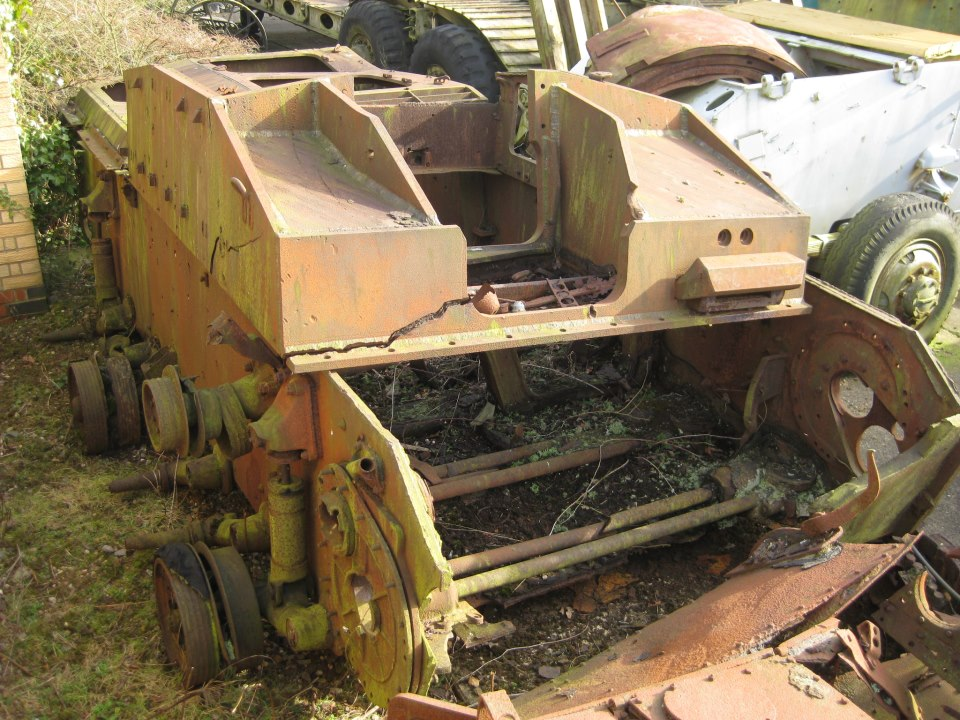
StuG III Ausf. D as received by Jon Phillips in May 2013

StuG III Ausf. D, chassis number 90678 was captured by the British Army at El Alamein in the North African Campaign and was taken to the UK for tests and study. This tank was recovered from the Pirbright firing range in UK, and was then part of Kevin Wheatcroft collection. The project was started on 1 May 2013 and was completed on 1 July 2016. The engine and transmission are not original, but were sourced through a surplus FV432 armoured personnel carrier.

The StuG III Ausf. D restoration was openly shared on social media, with many parts being sourced and suggestions made through its Facebook page and several YouTube channels.
