= MIAG =

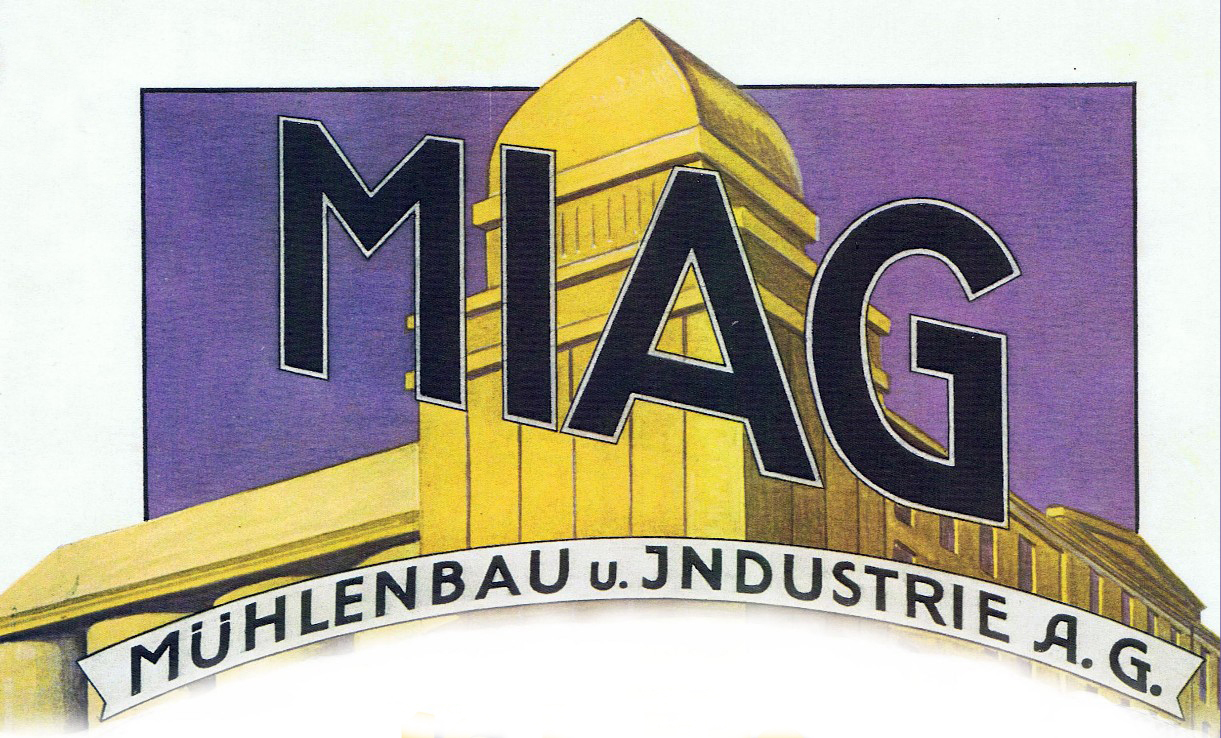
Logo of Miag (1937)

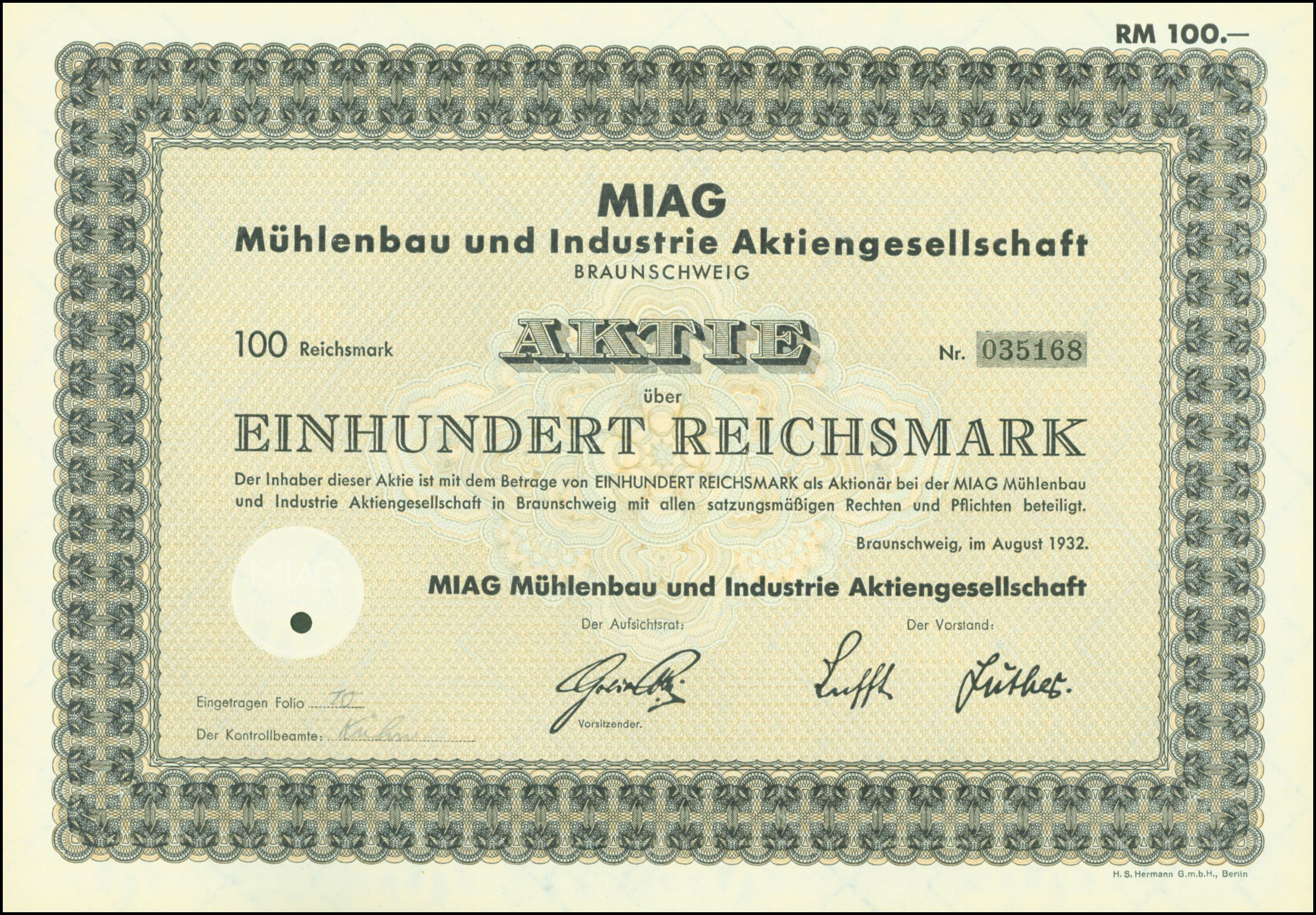
Share of the MIAG Mühlenbau und Industrie AG, issued August 1932

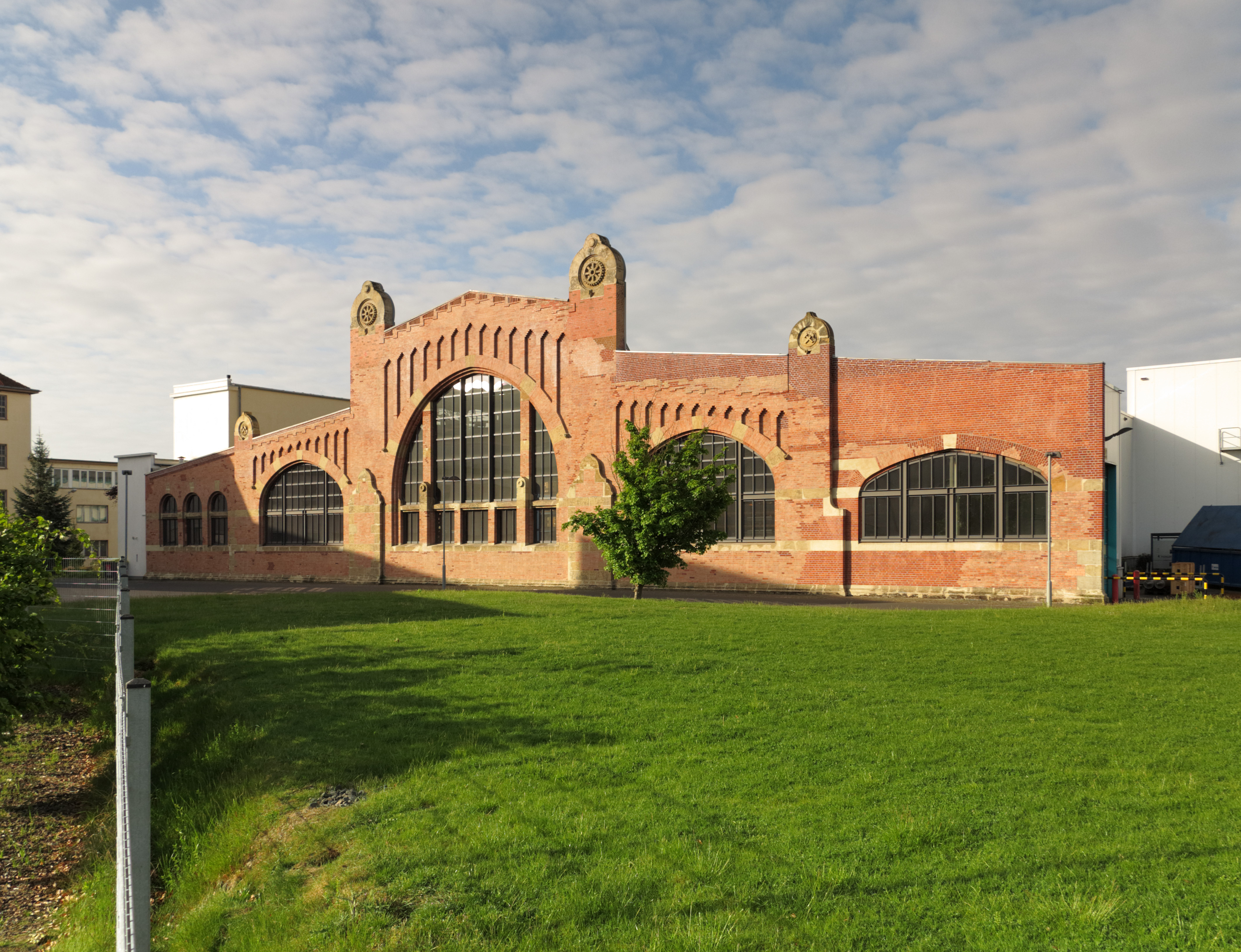
MIAG (2015)

The MIAG Mühlenbau und Industrie Aktiengesellschaft was a mechanical engineering company from Braunschweig, Germany which was acquired by Bühler in Uzwil, Switzerland in 1972.

The company was founded in 1925 in Frankfurt am Main from the merger of the resident Hugo Greffenius AG with four other grain mill manufacturers:

- Mühlenbauanstalt und Maschinenfabrik vorm. Gebrüder Seck – Dresden-Zschachwitz, founded 1873
- Maschinenfabrik für Mühlenbau, vorm. C.G.W. Kapler Akt.Ges. – Berlin, founded. 1875
- G. Luther, Maschinenfabrik und Mühlenbau (Luther-Werke) – Braunschweig, founded 1875
- Braunschweigische Mühlenbauanstalt Amme, Giesecke & Konegen (AGK) – founded in 1895 by former Luther employees Ernst Amme, Carl Giesecke Julius Konegen
