= Cocos Lovers =

English folk and roots band

Cocos Lovers are a folk and roots band based in Deal, Kent. They are signed to Smugglers Records and have been described by The Independent as "Kent folk with an African twist".

== Discography ==
- Johannes (2010)
- Elephant Lands (2011)
- Gold or Dust (2013)
- Everything We Hold in Hope (2019)
