= War and Peace Revival =

World's largest military vehicle show and historical re-enactment

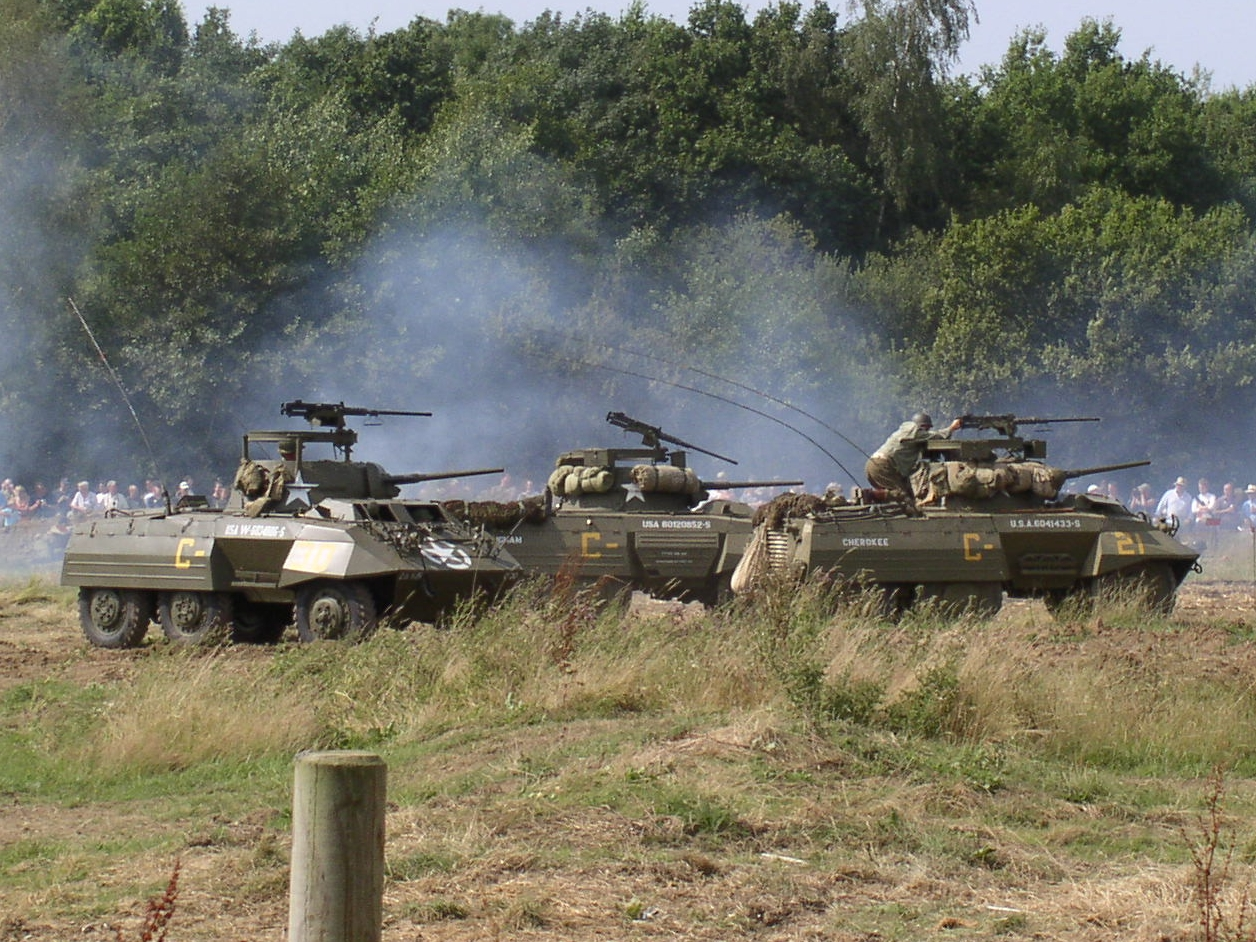
Vehicles in action at War and Peace 2004

The War and Peace Revival (also called the War and Peace Show) was a military vehicle show, militaria fair and living history re-enactment from the First World War to more recent conflicts. War and Peace Show was held annually over several days (usually in late July). Till 2019 at the Hop Farm Country Park, Kent, England (for four years between 2013 and 2016 it was held at Folkestone Racecourse (RAF Westenhanger)).

== Vehicles ==
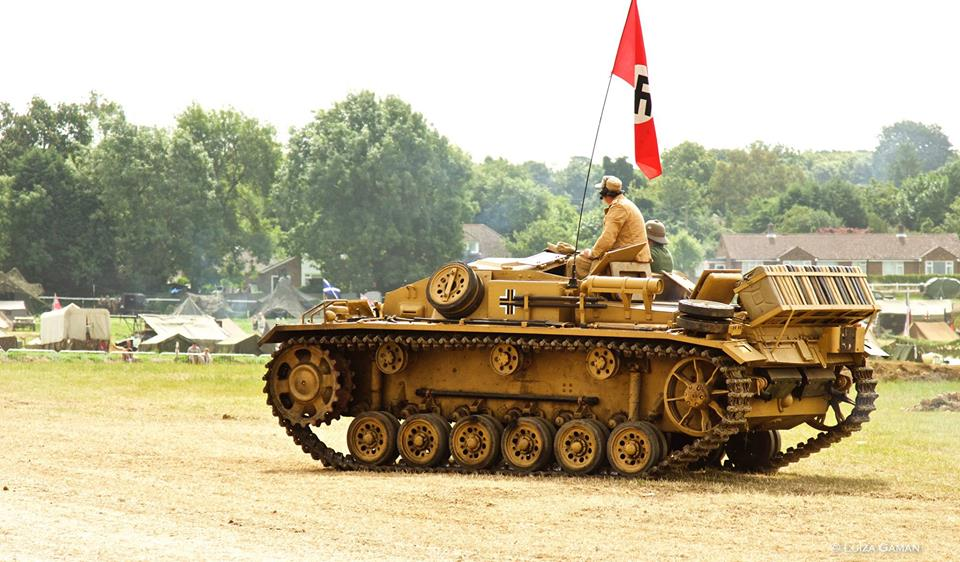
Jon Phillips privately owned Stug III Ausf D

The revival hosted around 4000 military vehicles including tanks, armoured personnel carriers, armoured cars, amphibious vehicles, motorcycles, as well as light, medium and heavy military wheeled vehicles. The 2015 show attracted over 100,000 visitors during its five days. The armoured vehicles that participate in the show include those from The Wheatcroft Collection and the Jon Phillips Armor Collection.

== Re-enactments ==
A part of the show revolved around the different re-enactors that portray various armies, units and events during armed conflicts during the 20th century. Especially prominent are Allied and Axis forces from the World War II, with mock battles staged in main arena using period vehicles, re-enactors and pyrotechnics.

== Change of venue and name ==
Between 2013 and 2016 the show relocated to Folkestone Racecourse (which for a time in 1944 was known as RAF Westenhanger (after the nearby village)) and changed its name to the War and Peace Revival. On 23 June 2015 organisers Rex Cadman and Barbara Shea announced that they would be retiring after the 2015 show. On Saturday 25 July 2015 it was confirmed that John Allison and his team would be taking over the show on 1 August 2015. They ran the show at the Hop Farm Country Park, Kent, England until 2019, due to COVID-19.
