= List of tanks in the Spanish Civil War =

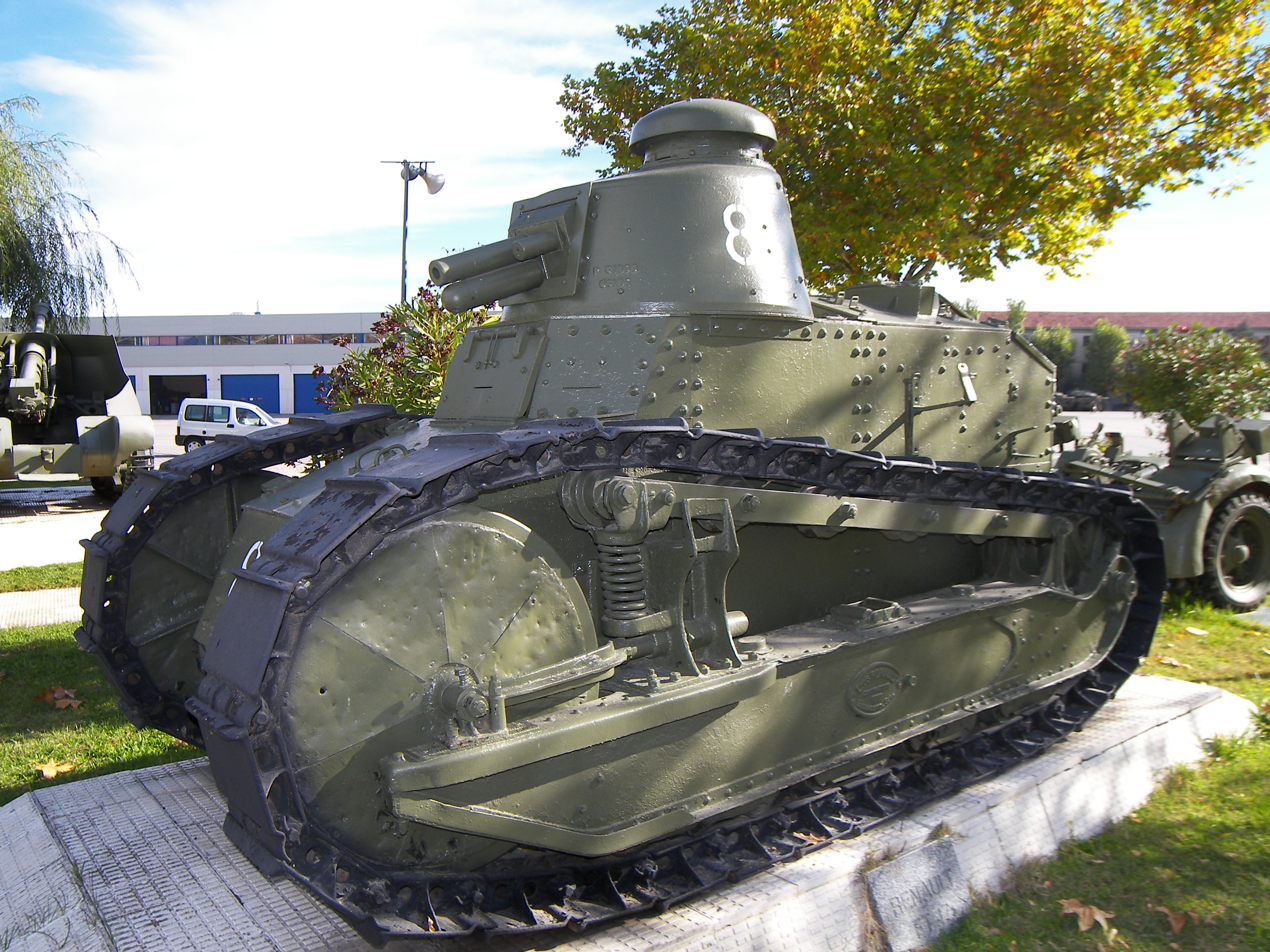
Renault FT light tank supplied to the Popular Front during the Spanish Civil War

The Spanish Civil War, fought between 1936 and 1939, provided an opportunity for many European countries to evaluate new technologies and tactics, including armored warfare. At the beginning of the war, the Nationalist and Popular Fronts each possessed only five World War I-era-design Renault FT light tanks, although these were soon reinforced with imported materiel. Italy began supplying Nationalist Spain with L3/35 tankettes in August 1936. The Soviet Union soon followed suit by supplying the Popular Front with T-26 light tanks in October 1936. Germany sent its first shipments of Panzer I light tanks to the Nationalist Front in September 1936. During the war, France and Poland provided the Popular Front with a number of additional FT light tanks. A considerable number of tanks delivered to the Popular Front were subsequently captured; many of these were put into service against their former owners.

The Nationalist and Popular armies also designed and manufactured a number of their own tanks. The Nationalists, for example, began the war with three Trubia A4 prototypes, manufactured before the beginning of the conflict. They also completed the first prototype of the Verdeja light tank. This was designed to overcome the shortcomings of tanks provided by the Germans and the Italians, as well as Soviet tanks captured from the Popular Front. Popular Front production of armored vehicles was segmented throughout different areas of Spain. In the north, between 15 and 20 Carro Trubia-Naval tanks were manufactured at the factory in Sestao, conversely the Trubia factory had built only a single model Landesa tank. In Catalonia, two tanks were produced by the Maquinaría Moderna factory in Sant Sadurní d'Anoia. Though the Popular Front designed and manufactured many more armored fighting vehicles than the Nationalists, this ultimately worked in the Nationalists favor as the factories and their production lines were captured intact during the war.

== Tanks in service at the beginning ==
Tank	Location	Units in service
Schneider CA1	Madrid	4
Renault FT	Madrid and Zaragoza	10
Fiat 3000	Carabanchel	1
Trubia A4	Oviedo	3
Landesa	Trubia	2

== Manufactured in Spain ==
=== Produced and deployed by the Nationalists ===
Tank	Location of construction	Number produced	Year
Mercier	Zaragoza	1	1936
C.C.I. tipo 1937	Sestao	1	1937
Verdeja	Zaragoza	1	1938

=== Produced and deployed by the Popular Front ===
Tank	Location of construction	Number produced	Year
Sadurni de Noya	Sant Sadurní d'Anoia	6	1937
Barbastro	Barbastro	4	1937
Trubia A4	Trubia	2	1936
Trubia-Naval	Sestao	12–20	1936–37

== Tanks supplied by foreign powers ==
Tank	Nation of origin	Number supplied	Side supplied to
BT-5	Soviet Union	50	Popular Front
Renault FT	France and Poland	64	Popular Front
L3/33 / L3/35	Italy	155	Nationalists
Panzer I	Germany	122	Nationalists
T-26	Soviet Union	281	Popular Front
Vickers Six-Ton	United Kingdom	1	Popular Front

== Tanks captured by the Nationalists ==
Tank	Nation of origin	Number captured	Number put back into service
Landesa	Spain	1	1
Trubia Naval	Spain	10–20	Unknown, used mostly for training
BT-5	Soviet Union	Unknown	At least 1
Renault FT	France	Unknown	24
T-26	Soviet Union	178	Approx. 50
