= CV-35 =

CV-35 may refer to:

- USS Reprisal (CV-35), a United States Navy aircraft carrier that was scrapped before completion
- L3/35 or Carro Veloce CV-35, an Italian light tank
- Autovía CV-35, an autovía in Spain
