= Félix Verdeja Bardales =

Spanish army officer and tank designer (1904–1977)

Félix Verdeja Bardales (10 April 1904 – 20 May 1977) was a Lieutenant colonel in the Spanish Army. Verdeja Bardales was the designer principally responsible for the Verdeja light tank, between 1938 and 1954.

Verdeja Bardales was born in the Asturian village of Panes in Peñamellera Baja.

According to warhistory.org, Captain Félix Verdeja led the development of four prototype vehicles, including a self-propelled howitzer armed with a 75 millimetere gun.
