= L3/35 =

Italian tankette that saw combat before and during World War II

Carro Armato L3/35
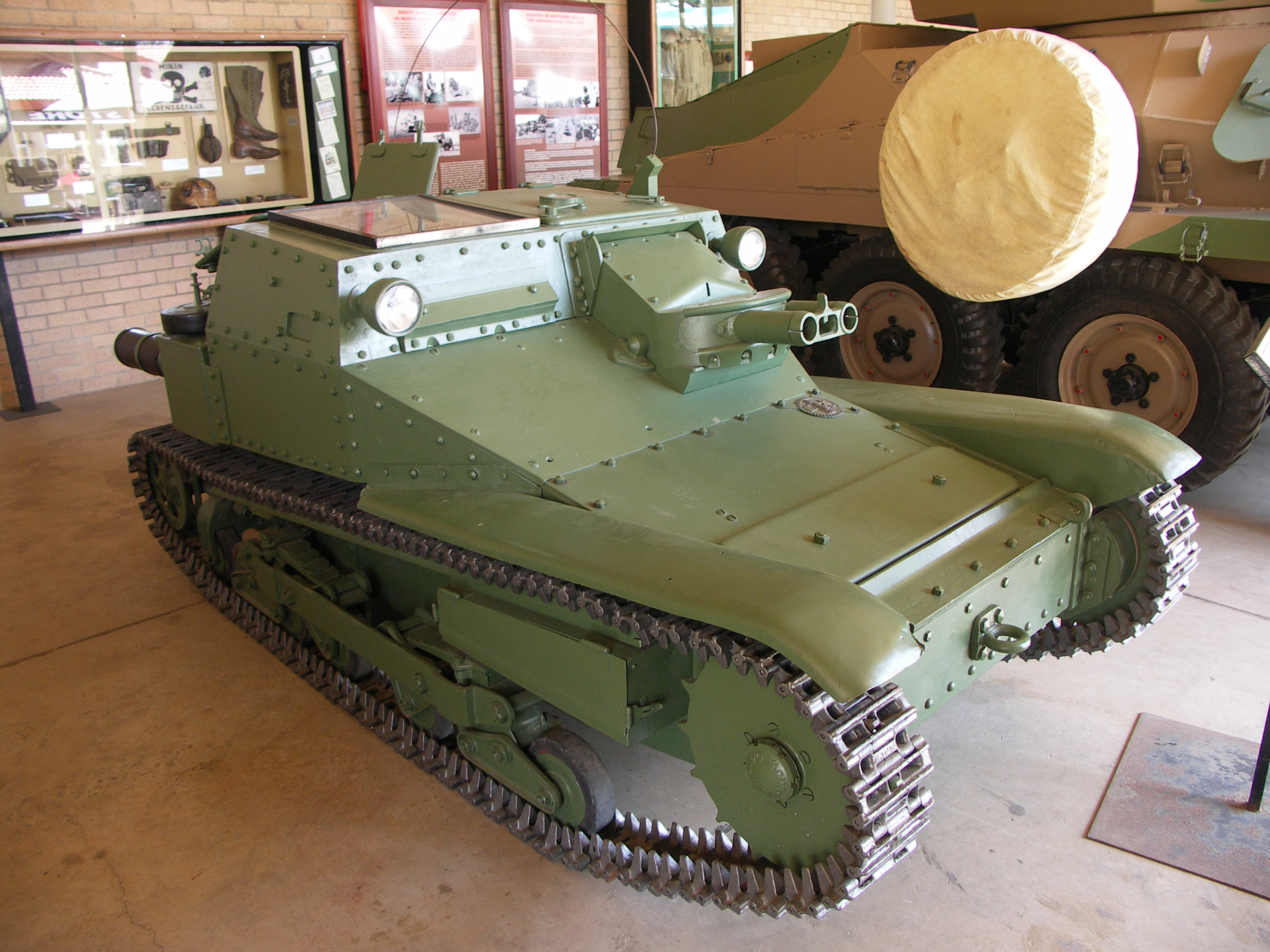
- L3/35 displayed at the South African National Museum of Military History (without machine guns).
- Type: Tankette
- Place of origin: Kingdom of Italy

Service history
- In service: 1 October 1935 – 2022
- Used by: Kingdom of Italy and others
- Wars: Second Italo-Abyssinian War; Spanish Civil War; Second Sino-Japanese War; Slovak–Hungarian War; Invasion of Albania; Second World War; Greco-Italian War; Anglo-Iraqi War; Chinese Civil War; War in Afghanistan (2001–2021)

Production history
- Produced: 1935–1938
- No. built: 1,200 L3/33; 1,300 L3/35
- Variants: L3/33, L3/38, L3 cc, L3 Lf,

Specifications
- Mass: 3.2 tonnes (3.1 long tons; 3.5 short tons)
- Length: 3.17 m (10 ft 4 3/4 in)
- Width: 1.4 m (4 ft 7 1/8 in)
- Height: 1.3 m (4 ft 3 1/8 in)
- Crew: 2 (commander and driver)
- Armour: 6–14 mm (0.24–0.55 in)
- Main armament: 2 × 8 mm (0.31 in) machine guns
- Engine: FIAT-SPA CV3 water cooled 43 hp (32 kW)
- Suspension: bogie
- Operational range: 125 km (78 mi)
- Maximum speed: 42 km/h (26 mph) on road

The L3/35, also known as the Carro Veloce CV-35, was an Italian tankette that saw combat before and during World War II. It was one of the smallest tanks that faced combat. Although designated a light tank by the Italian Army, its turretless configuration, weight and firepower make it closer to contemporary tankettes. It was the most numerous Italian armoured fighting vehicle and saw service almost everywhere the Italians fought in the Second World War but proved inadequate for modern warfare, having too thin armour and weak armament of only machine guns. It was cheaply produced but because of its light armaments and armour it was reserved for mostly colonial, policing, reconnaissance, and supply duties. Its low production costs contributed to its successful deployment in the Second Italo-Abyssinian War, Spanish Civil War and the Greco-Italian War, where it provided reliable support to Italian infantry and disrupted enemy lines.

== Development ==
The L3/35 was developed from the Carden Loyd Mark VI tankette, four of which were imported from Britain in 1929. The first vehicle developed by the Italians from the Carden Lloyd tankette was designated CV-29; "CV" being an abbreviation of Carro Veloce (Italian: "fast tank") and "29" as the year of adoption. Only twenty-one CV-29s were built.

=== L3/33 ===
In 1933, a new design was built jointly by the Fiat Company of Turin and the Ansaldo Company of Genoa. This vehicle was introduced as the Fiat-Ansaldo CV-33. About 300 CV-33s were built.

=== L3/35 ===
In 1935, a slightly improved model of the CV-33 was introduced and designated CV-35. The primary differences were that the armour was bolted rather than riveted and the single 6.5 mm machine gun was replaced with twin 8 mm machine guns. Many older CV-33s were retrofitted to meet the specifications of the CV-35. In 1938, the vehicles were redesignated L3/33 ("L" for Leggero or 'light') and the L3/35.

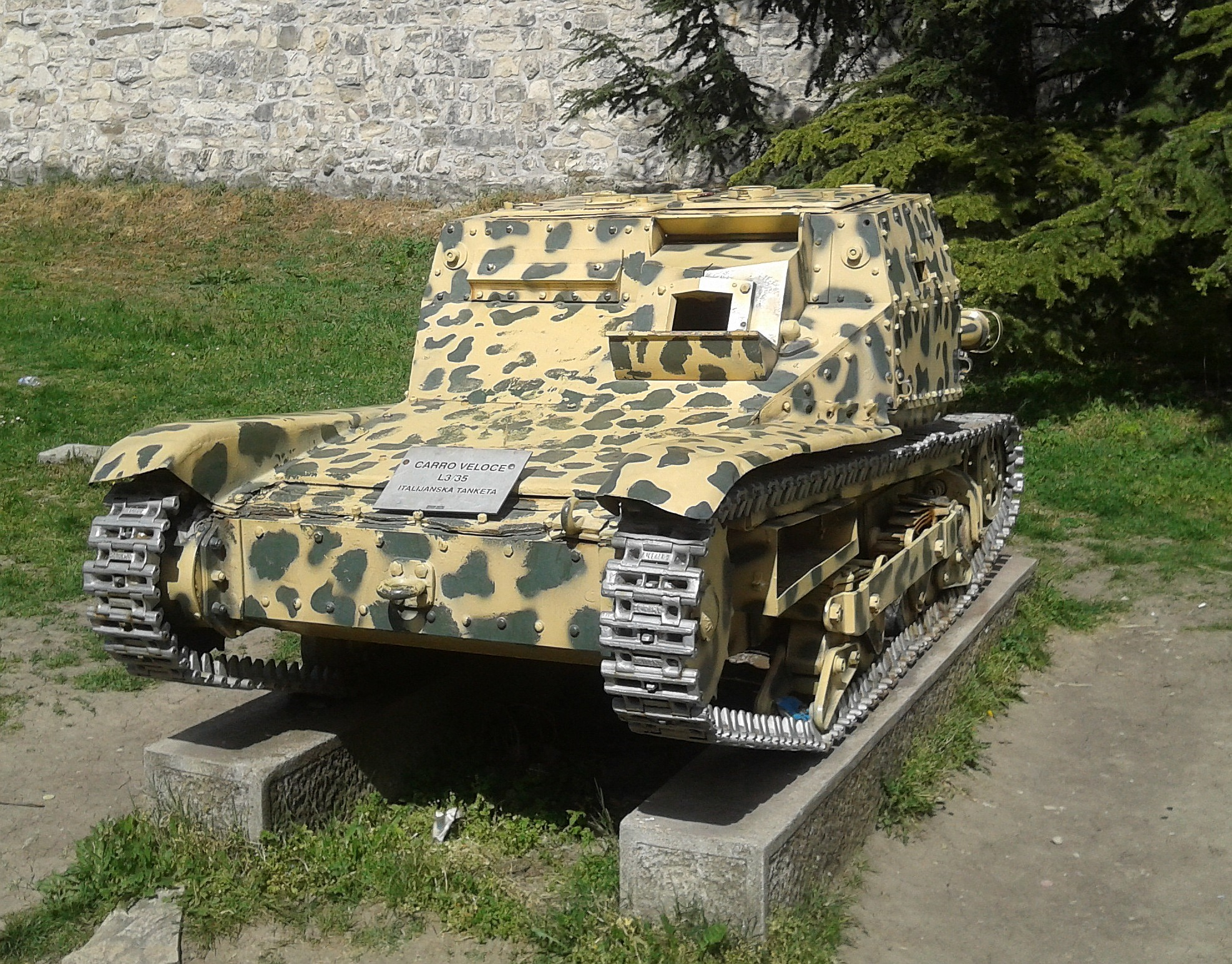
L3/35 on display at the Military Museum, Belgrade.

=== L3/38 ===
In 1938, a further development of the L3 design was designated L3/38. The L3/38 had torsion bar suspension and two versions of a single mounted 13.2 mm machine gun.

Italy retrofitted at least 12 L3/35s to meet the specifications of the L3/38. The converted L3/35s with the L3/38's torsion bar suspension saw limited service in September 1943 until June 1944. These L3/38s versions of the L3/35s were armed with a single 13.2 mm Breda M31 machine gun.

=== Layout ===
The L3/35 was a lightly armoured two-man vehicle typically armed with twin 8 mm machine guns, though variants were developed with other armament. Other than the number and type of machine guns, the differences between the L3/35 and the L3/33 were few. Both featured riveted and welded construction.

The commander/gunner sat on the left and the driver sat on the right. The engine was mounted transversely in the rear. A circular radiator was mounted behind the engine. The transmission went to the front to the final drive. The Vickers-Carden-Lloyd type suspension had two three-wheel bogies on leaf spring and a single unsprung wheel on each side. The top run of the tracks ran on an acacia rail.

== Production and sales ==
Between 2,000 and 2,500 L3 tankettes were built in different models and variants for the Royal Italian Army (Regio Esercito) and for other users. Twenty L3/33 tankettes were sold to China. Other L3 tankettes were sold to Afghanistan (unknown number), Albania (unknown number), Austria (72), Bolivia (14), Brazil (23), Bulgaria (14), Croatia (10), Hungary (1 CV-33 and 150 CV-35s), Iraq (16), Nationalist Spain, and Venezuela (2). Many foreign buyers substituted other machine guns as the main armament. The Hungarians added a raised commander's vision cupola to 45 of the L3s they acquired. Each Hungarian CV was equipped with an improved machine gun system: a tilting shield allowing greater lateral and vertical aiming, and two high-firerate Gebauer machine guns. From mid-1942, Hungarian CVs were used only for training, with each new tank driver practicing 150km during their training. In 1937, the Brazilian Army ordered 18 L3/35 tankettes, designated Auto Metralhadora de Reconhecimento which remained in active service until 1945 when some units were resold to the Dominican Republic. Venezuela bought two units in 1934 for evaluation in infantry support operations, because of several incidents on the border with Colombia. Like other weapons acquired from the Italian mission they did not survive past World War II.

== Combat history ==
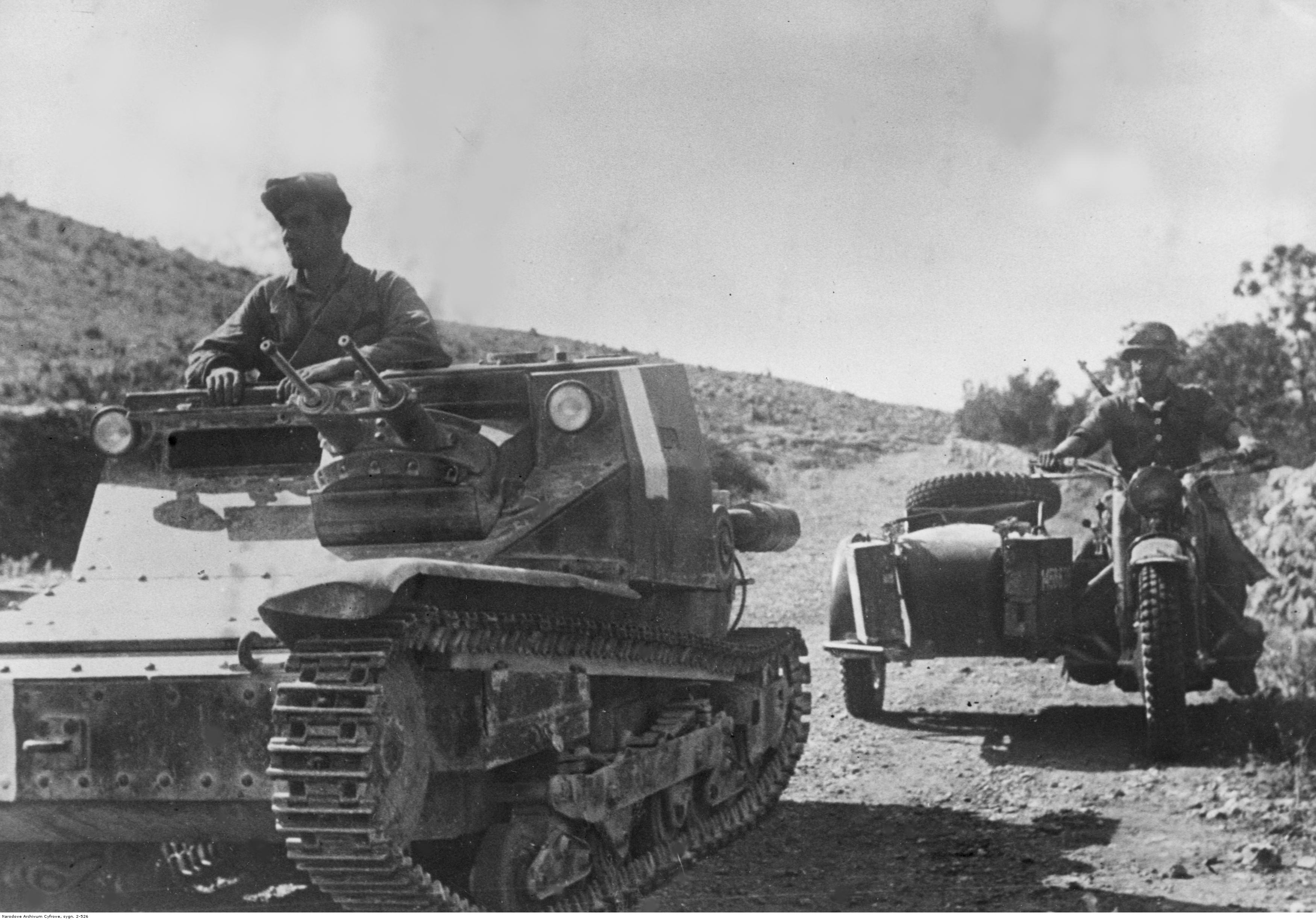
Italian L3/35 in the Balkans, August 1943.

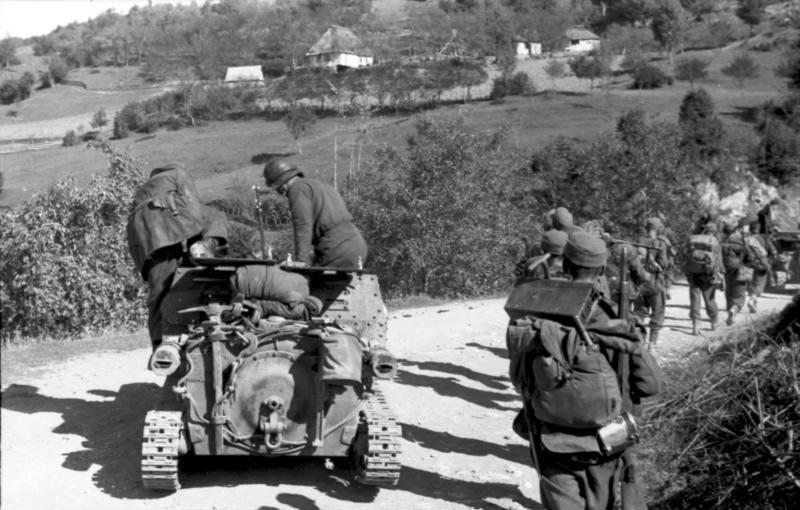
Italian L3/35 in Albania, September 1943.

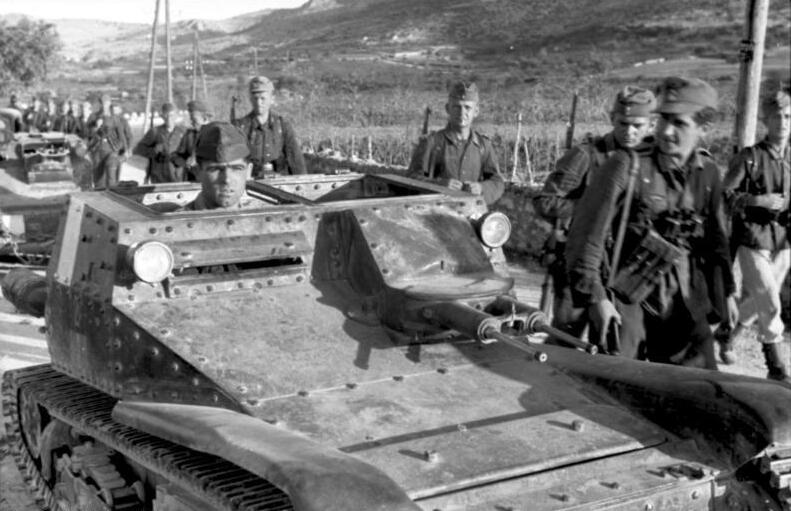
Close-up of Italian L3/35 in the Balkans, August 1943.

In addition to seeing action in the Second Italo-Abyssinian War, the Second Sino-Japanese War, the Spanish Civil War, the Slovak-Hungarian War, and the Anglo-Iraqi War, the L3 was used almost everywhere that Italian troops fought during World War II. L3s were found on the Italian/French border, North Africa, Italian East Africa, the Balkans, USSR, Sicily, and Italy.

The combat performance of the L3s during the interwar period was poor. During the Italian conquest of Ethiopia, on many occasions L3s were put out of action by Ethiopian infantry, who fired rifles through the vision slits, killing the crew inside. In the Spanish Civil War, L3s of the Corps of Volunteer Troops (Corpo Truppe Volontarie, or CTV) were totally out-classed by the T-26 and BT-5 tanks provided to the Republican forces by the Soviet Union. The L3s were not a factor in the brief war between Hungary and Slovakia in 1939.

On 10 June 1940, when Italy entered World War II, the Royal Italian Army (Regio Esercito) possessed only about one-hundred M11/39 medium tanks in two tank battalions. L3 tankettes still equipped all three Italian armoured divisions, the tank battalions in the motorized divisions, the light tank squadron group in each "Fast" (Celere) division, and numerous independent tank battalions.

On 22 March 1941, two Iraqi L3s were reported to have been put out of action near Fallujah during the Anglo-Iraqi War.

More than 40 captured L3 tankettes were used by the Greek Army during the Greco-Italian War, fought from 1940 to 1941, and were used to equip the 19th Mechanized Division, although they did not take part in combat with the latter. After the invasion of Yugoslavia and Greece in April 1941, L3 tankettes were also captured by the Yugoslav and Greek resistance forces. From 1941, some L3 tankettes were given to the Italo-German puppet government of the Independent State of Croatia (Nezavisna Država Hrvatska, or NDH).

Though numerous, Italy's tankettes proved to be outclassed from the start and also proved to be of low tactical value. They were vulnerable to the British Boys anti-tank rifles. Other than those used for occupation duties in the Balkans and elsewhere, few L3s remained in front line service past the end of 1940. After the Italian armistice with the Allies in 1943, L3 tankettes were used by German Army forces and by the pro-Nazi National Republican Army of the Italian Social Republic. Hungarian L3s had by this point been issued to the Gendarmerie.

L3/35s also joined the Chinese Nationalist Army fighting against the Japanese Imperial Army during the Second Sino-Japanese War and the Communists during the Chinese Civil War.

== Variants ==
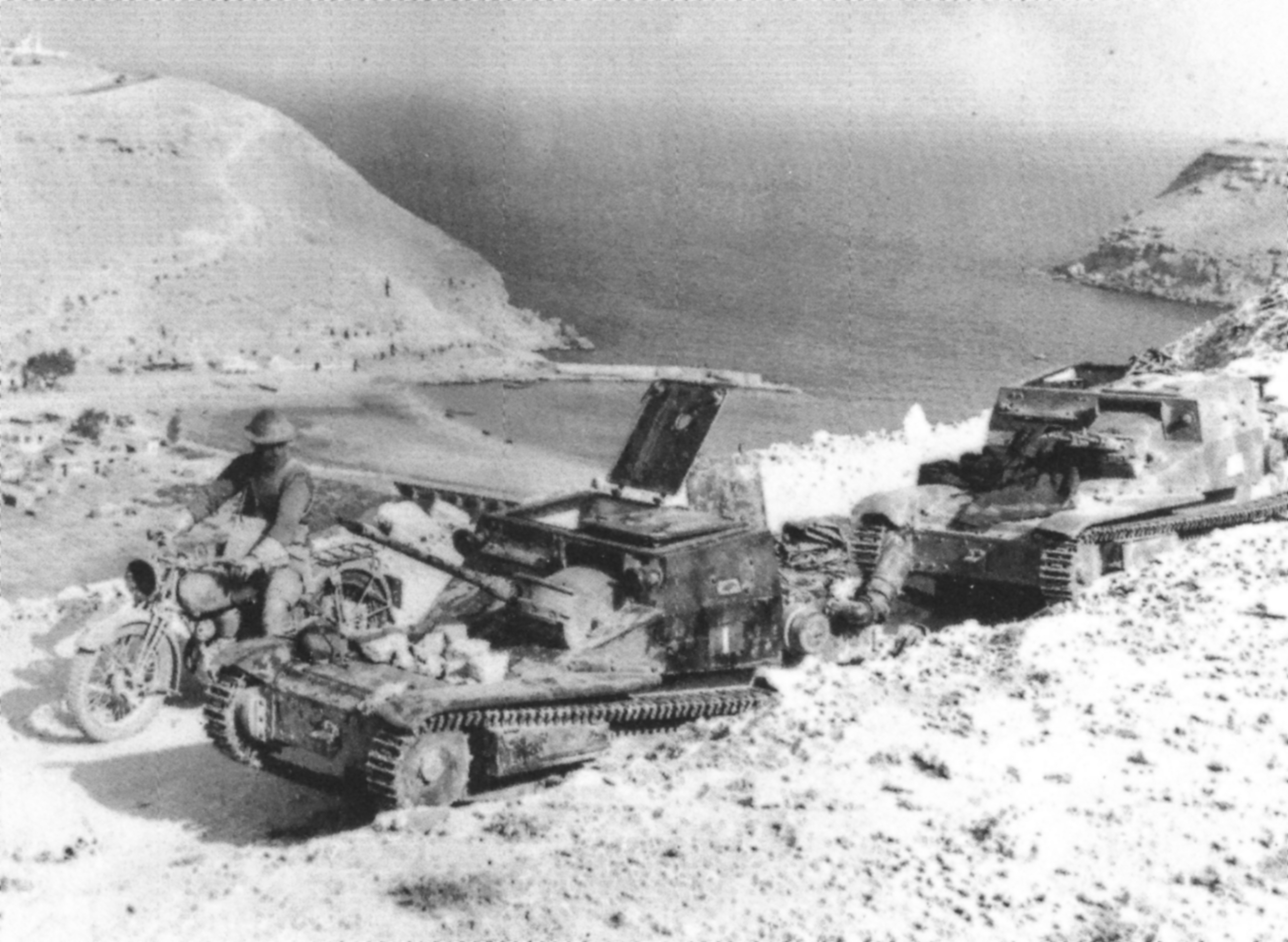
A captured L3 cc (left) and an L3/35 (right) outside Bardia in 1941.

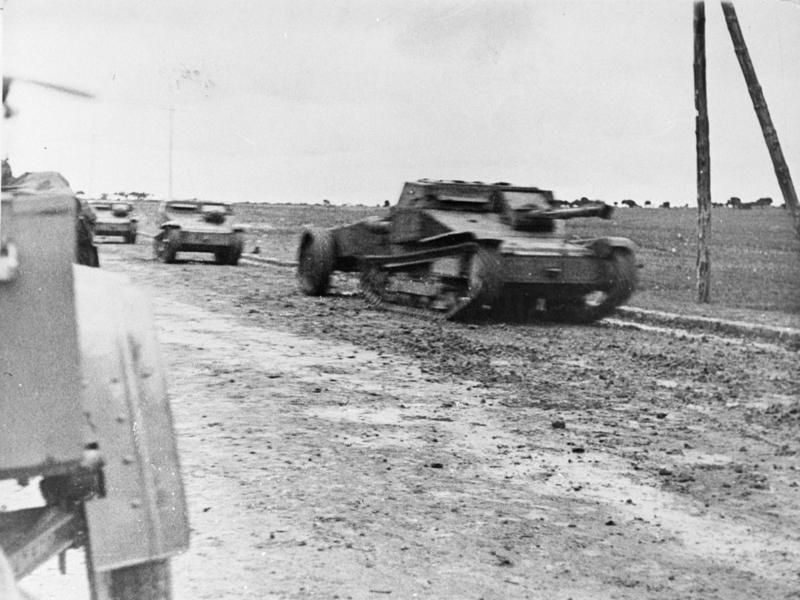
Italian tankettes advancing with a L3 Lf flame thrower tank in the lead at the Battle of Guadalajara.

The L3/35 appeared in several variants including an anti-tank variant and a flame thrower variant.

=== L3 cc anti-tank ===
The "L3 cc" anti-tank (controcarro) was an L3 with a Solothurn 20 mm anti-tank rifle mounted in place of its normal machine gun armament. Only a few were so modified, and they saw action only in North Africa.

The Solothurn rifle could penetrate up to 18 mm of armor at 300 m (328 yards) which was effective against lightly armoured vehicles.

=== L3 Lf flamethrower ===
Development of the "L3 Lf" flamethrower (lancia fiamme) flame tank began in 1935. The flamethrower nozzle replaced one of the machine guns, and the flame fuel was carried in an armoured 500-litre (133 US gallons) fuel trailer towed by the vehicle. Later versions carried another 60 litres of fuel in a box-shaped tank mounted above the L3's engine compartment. The vehicle weighed 5 metric tons.

The L3 Lf saw action in Abyssinia, Spain, France, the Balkans, North Africa, and Italian East Africa. From 1936 each CV/L3 company had a single L3 Lf platoon.

=== L3 Centro Radio command tank ===
The basic L3 platform was also employed as a command vehicle using the Marelli RF1 CA radio in platoon and company command vehicles. The L3 was considered too small to be effectively employed as a regimental level command radio vehicle so this task fell to the later and slightly larger L6/40 CR (Centro Radio = Radio Center).

=== L3 Passerella bridge layer ===
The few L3 Passerella (bridge layer) vehicles constructed were assigned to units at Armoured Brigade levels. The 7-meter-long (23 ft) bridge was stripped down into sections on a trailer towed by the L3 itself for travel. On arriving at the combat zone, this bridge was assembled on the front of the tank, suspended by cables from two small cranes located over the crew's superstructure. The crew laid the completed bridge over the obstacle from within the vehicle. A L3 Passerella crew took seven minutes to lay out this bridge.

=== Planned variants ===
A single Savoia-Marchetti SM.82 aircraft was modified to carry a L3/33 recessed under the fuselage for experiments with airborne armour.

==== Carro Veloce Recupero ====
Unarmed armoured recovery vehicle with a rear tow bar, did not progress beyond the prototype stage.

==== Semovente L3 da 47/32 ====
Tank destroyer with a 47 mm L/32 gun mounted in the hull, based on the L3/35. At least one built but did not enter service.

==== L3 tank ====
Tank built by Fiat-Ansaldo in 1937 on the L3/33 chassis with a redesigned hull and a 20 mm gun in a rotating turret. Did not enter serial production.

==== Aborted Spanish upgrade ====
On 8 August 1937, Major General García Pallasar had received a note from Generalísimo Francisco Franco which expressed the need for a Panzer I armed with a 20 mm gun. Although originally forty Italian L3/35 tankettes were ordered with the original armament exchanged for the 20 mm Breda Model 35 instead, this order was subsequently cancelled after it was thought that the adaptation of the same gun to the German Panzer I would yield better results.

== Users ==
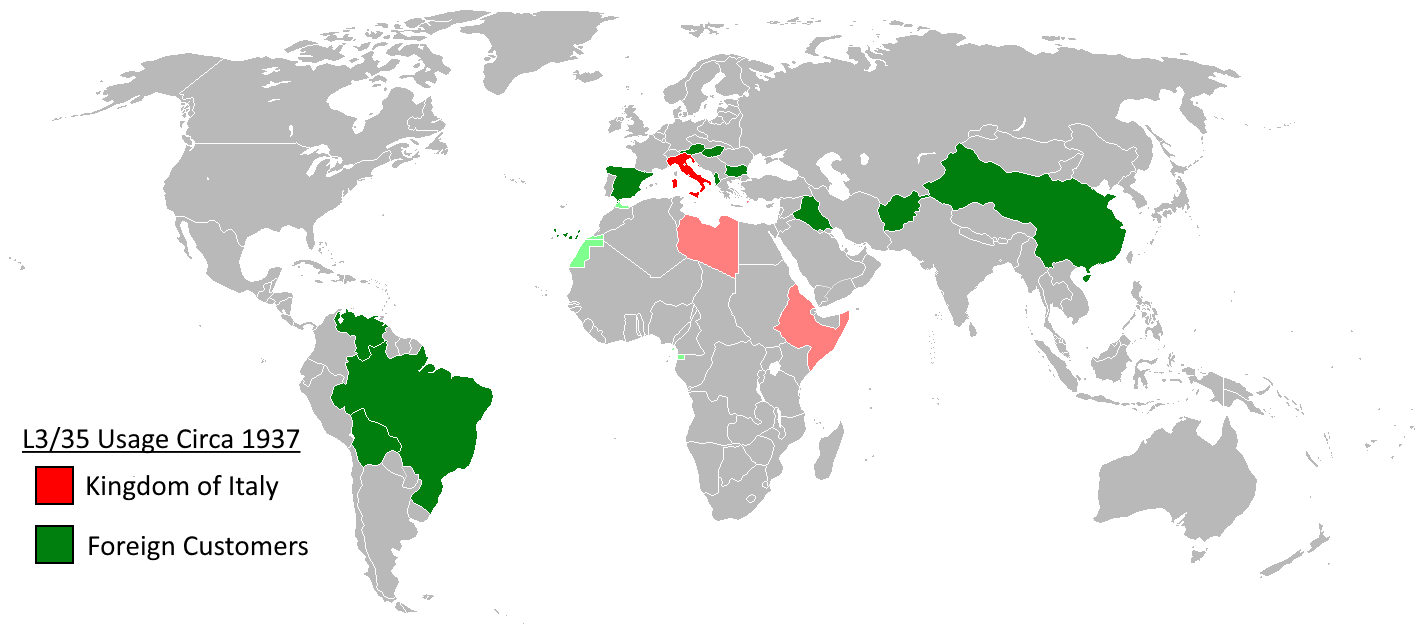
CV-35 usage circa 1937

- Islamic Emirate of Afghanistan: at least one seen in use by Taliban in working condition.
- Kingdom of Afghanistan: some later modified with Soviet KPV machine guns.
- Austria: 36 CV-35s of the first batch of production, delivered in March 1937.
- Brazil: 18 armed with twin-Madsen machine guns and 5 armed with a 13.2 Breda heavy machine gun.
- Kingdom of Bulgaria
- China
- Kingdom of Italy
- Iraq
- Nazi Germany
- Greece
- Kingdom of Hungary
- Spain
- Venezuela (the 2 examples were the first armoured vehicles used by its army)
- Ethiopian Empire: captured tanks during the Second Italo-Ethiopian War.

== See also ==
- Military history of Italy during World War II
- List of tanks in the Spanish Civil War
- Tank and Armoured Cars Group
- Weapons employed in the Slovak-Hungarian War

=== Comparable vehicles ===
- France: AMR. 33 • AMR. 35 • Lorraine 37L
- Germany: Panzer I
- Italy: L3/33
- Japan: Type 94 and Type 97 Te-Ke
- Romania: R-1
- Poland: TK-3 and TKS
- Soviet Union: T-27 • T-37A • T-38
- Sweden: Strv m/37
- United Kingdom: Light Tank Mk VI
- United States: Marmon-Herrington CTLS
