= Breda 20/65 mod.35 =

Italian light anti-aircraft gun

Breda 20/65 mod.35 Cannone-Mitragliera da 20/65 modello 35
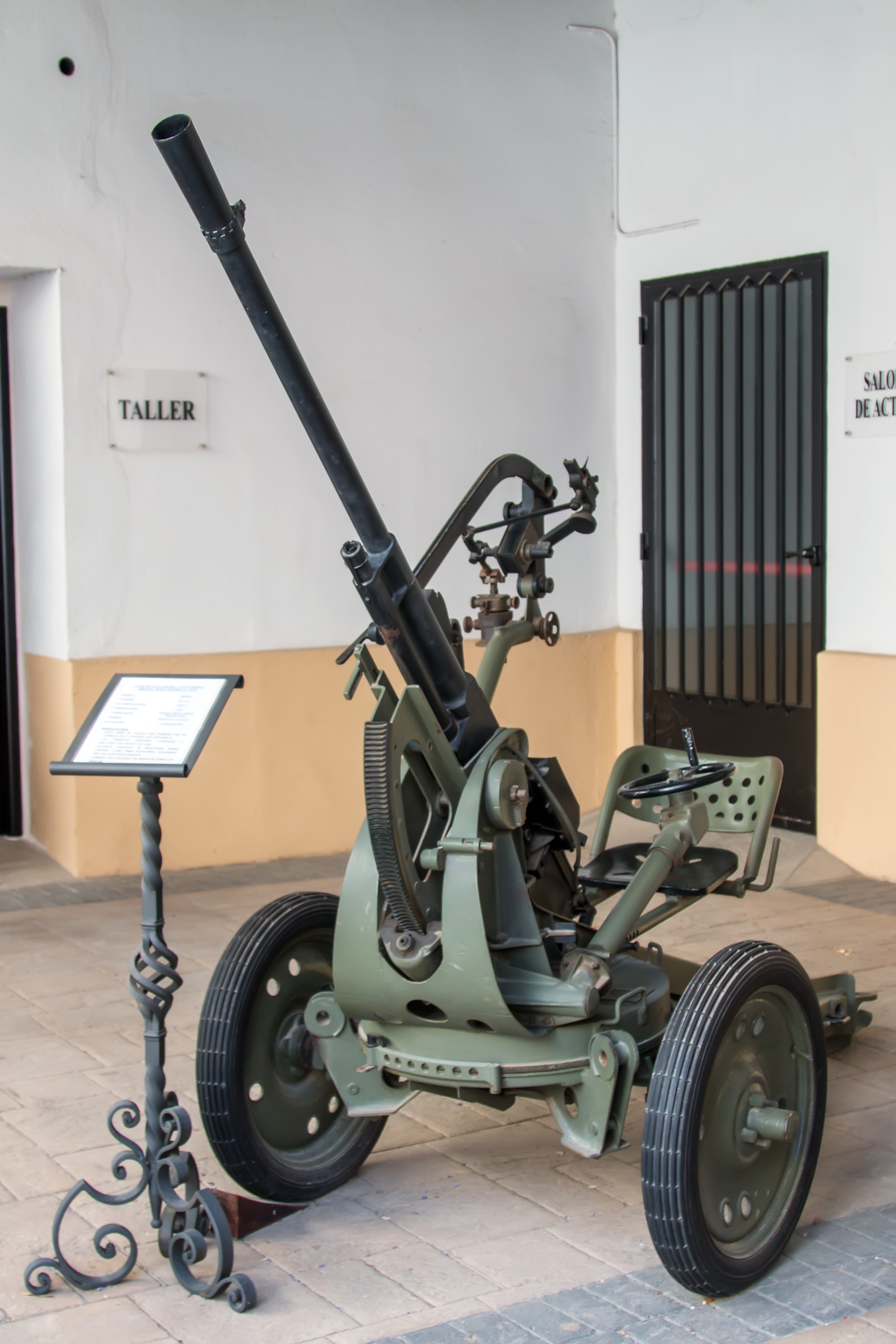
- Type: Light anti-aircraft gun Light anti-tank gun
- Place of origin: Italy

Service history
- In service: 1935 – c. 1985
- Used by: See Users
- Wars: Second Sino-Japanese War, Spanish Civil War, World War II, Ecuadorian–Peruvian War

Production history
- Designed: 1932
- Manufacturer: Breda Meccanica Bresciana
- No. built: 1088+

Specifications
- Mass: 330 kg (730 lb)
- Length: 3.34 m (10 ft 11 in)
- Barrel length: 1.87 m (6 ft 2 in)
- Crew: 3–6
- Shell: 20×138mmB
- Caliber: 20 mm (0.79 in)
- Barrels: 1
- Action: Gas-operated
- Elevation: -10 degrees to +80
- Traverse: 360 degrees
- Rate of fire: 240 rounds per minute
- Muzzle velocity: 840 m/s (2,800 ft/s)
- Effective firing range: 1,500 m (4,900 ft) (against aerial targets)
- Maximum firing range: 5.5 km (3.4 mi)
- Feed system: 12 round strip
- Sights: Telescopic predictor sight

The Breda 20/65 mod.35 ("Breda 20 mm L/65 model 1935"), also simply known as 20 mm Breda or Breda Model 35, among other variations, was an Italian 20 mm (0.787 in) anti-aircraft gun produced by the Società Italiana Ernesto Breda of Brescia company during the 1930s and early 1940s. It saw heavy usage during the Spanish Civil War and World War II, among other conflicts. It was designed in 1932 and adopted by the Italian armed forces in 1935, becoming one of two major 20 mm caliber anti-aircraft guns used by Italy during World War II, along with the Scotti-Isotta Fraschini 20/70 (Scotti 20 mm), both of which fired the Swiss 20x138mmB "Solothurn Long" cartridge.

The Royal Italian Army designated the gun Cannone-Mitragliera da 20/65 (lit. "Cannon-Machinegun 20/65"), and the mount modello 35 (model 1935), or mod.35 for short. Later, a mod.39 (1939) and a mod.40 (1940) system were introduced, featuring the same gun but in new mounts. The "20/65" part of the name refers to the caliber and barrel length of the gun (20 mm L/65).

== Ground version ==
Designed for use against aircraft and ground targets, it was effective against light tanks; its armour-piercing round could penetrate 30 millimeters of armour at 500 meters. It had a two-wheeled trailer, but due to its structural weakness that limited the towing speed to 20 km/h, the weapon was usually transported on a truck bed.

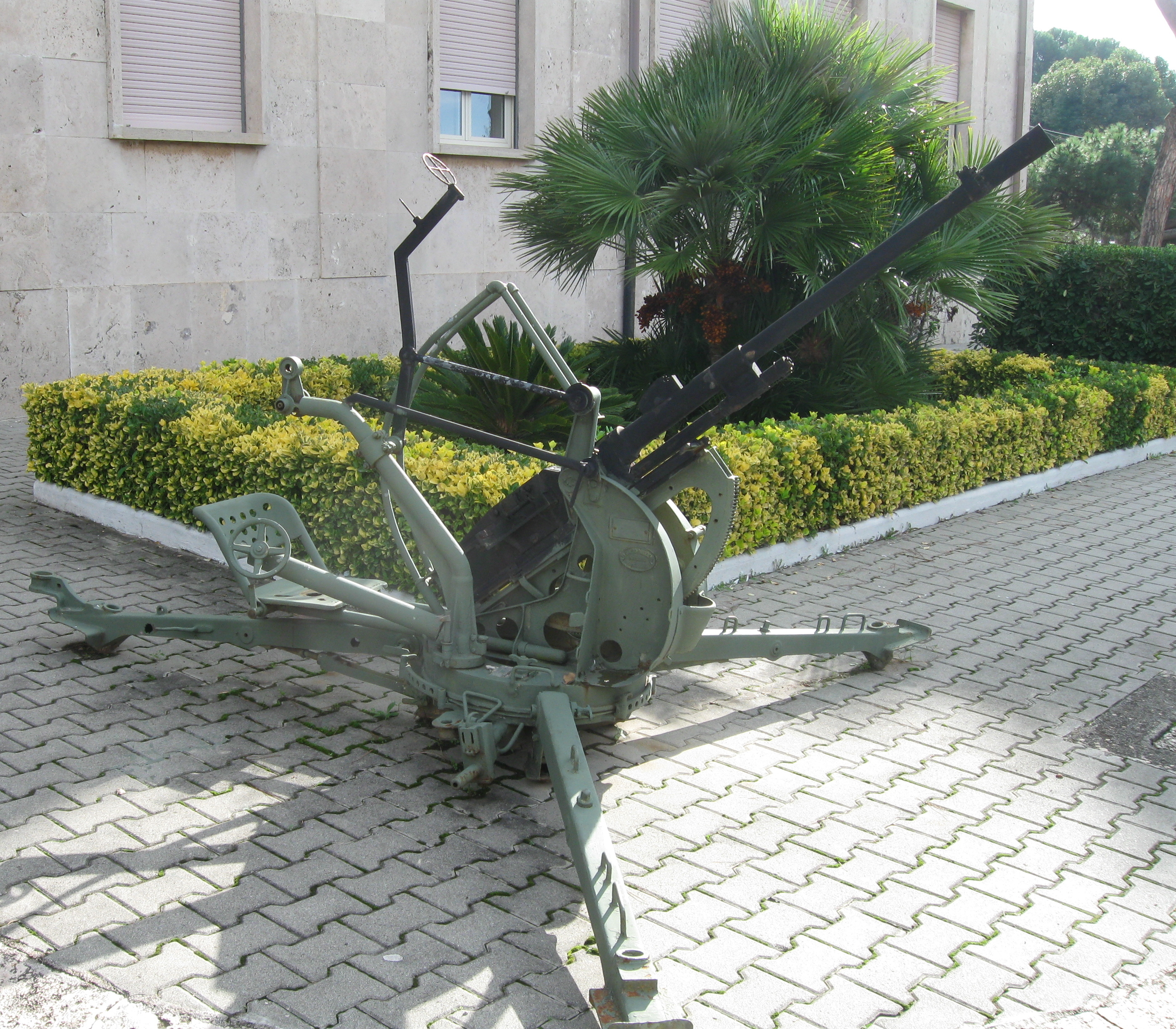
Breda 20/65 in single mount deployed as a tripod

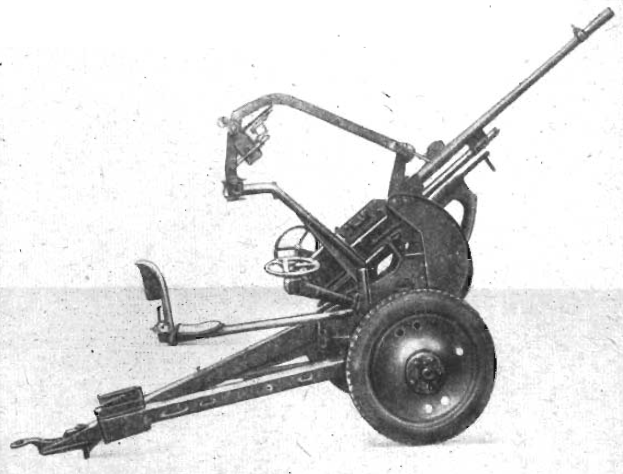
Breda 20/65 in single mount deployed with wheels

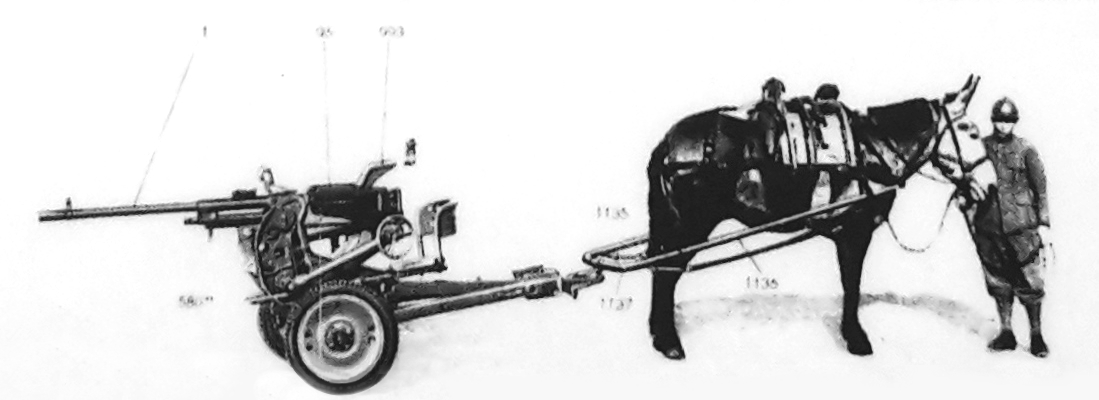
Breda 20/65 on wheeled mount drawn by a mule

In addition to use as an anti-aircraft gun, the 20 mm Breda was mounted as the main armament in several vehicles. In Italian Later the gun was fitted to Fiat L6/40 light tanks and the AB 41 armoured cars.

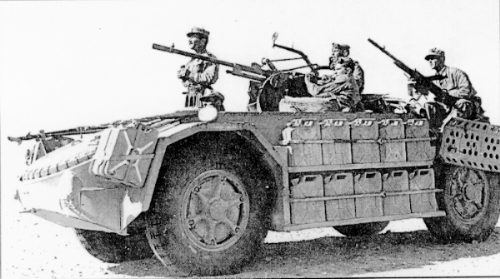
An AS.42 of the Italian Auto-Saharan Company mounted with a 20 mm Breda

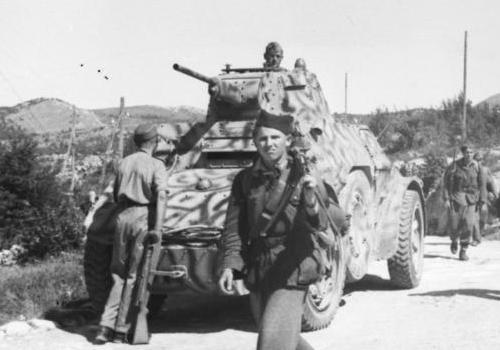
An Italian AB 41 armored car with a Breda 20 mm

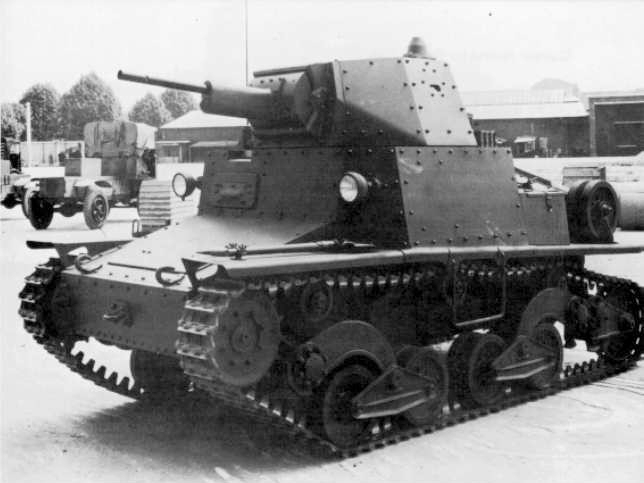
Fiat L6/40 light tank armed with a Breda 20/65 in its turret

== Naval version ==
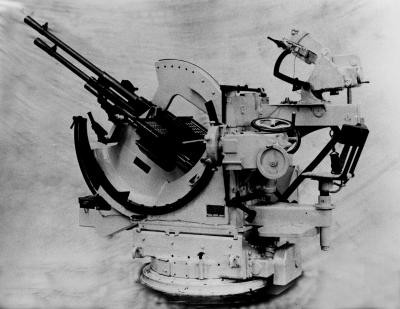
Italian 20 mm Breda in a naval twin-mount

This gun was widely employed by the Regia Marina as a deck-mounted anti-aircraft weapon in most Italian warships, in both single and twin mountings; considered a fairly efficient weapon, in the widespread Model 1935 twin mounting, it shared with the similar Cannone-Mitragliera da 37/54 the operating systems and therefore its flaws, namely high vibrations and the requirement for a strong supporting structure. Of the two single mountings (Model 1939 and 1940), the latter (widely used on small units like corvettes, and MAS), partly corrected these faults and had a better sight; however, overall the Breda 20 mm was considered somewhat inferior to the Oerlikon 20 mm cannon (used by the Regia Marina from 1941). All the mountings had an elevation of −10 to +90 degrees.

The 1935 twin-mounting fitted the guns next to each other with the left gun (in direction of aim) placed on a level above the right gun so as to clear the horizontal ammunition feeding port.

== Users ==
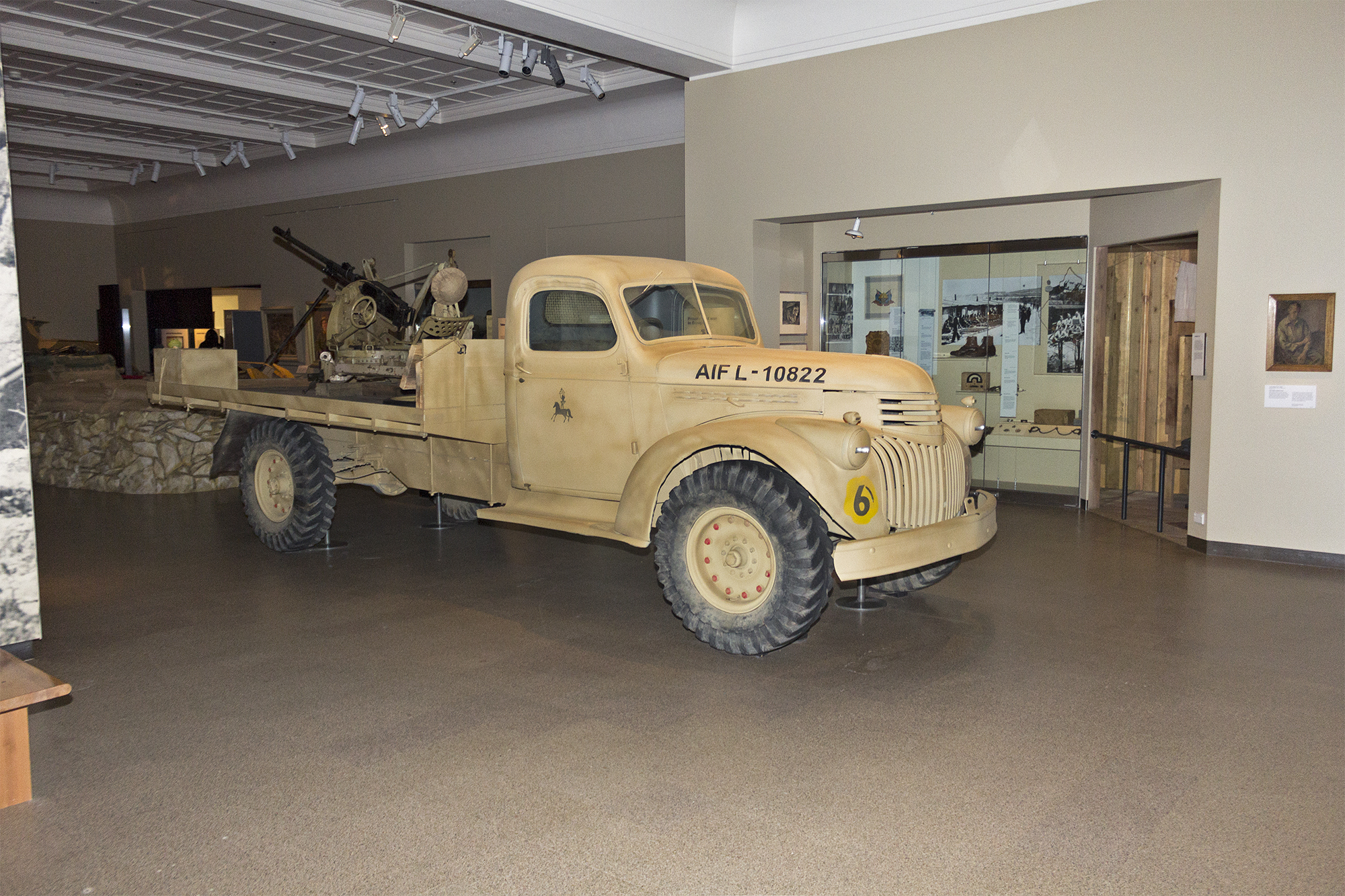
20 mmm Breda mounted on the bed of a 1941 Chevrolet Model 41-E22 General Service truck of the Australian Imperial Force on display in the World War II gallery at the Australian War Memorial

- Australia
- China – among various other warring Chinese military factions of the Chinese Civil War
- Costa Rica
- Dominican Republic
- Ecuador
- Finland – designation: 20 ItK/35, Breda
- Germany – designation: 2 cm MG 282 (i), 2 cm Breda (i)
- Italy
- Slovakia
- Spain – among the other warring Italian military factions of the Spanish Civil War
- Sweden – designation: 20 mm akan M/38
- United Kingdom
- Yugoslavia

=== British commonwealth ===
In North Africa, the Commonwealth forces captured many 20 mm Bredas during Operation Compass, enabling the Australian 2/3 Light Anti-Aircraft Regiment, parts of the 4th Anti-Aircraft Brigade (which had a total of 42 Bredas in its Light Anti-Aircraft batteries during the Siege of Tobruk) and one battery of 106th (Lancashire Hussars) Regiment, RHA to be equipped with them.

Captured Bredas were used by the Long Range Desert Group and Royal Australian Navy and Royal Navy vessels including HMAS Vendetta, HMAS Perth and HMS Ladybird, and at least one Marmon-Herrington Mk II armoured car.

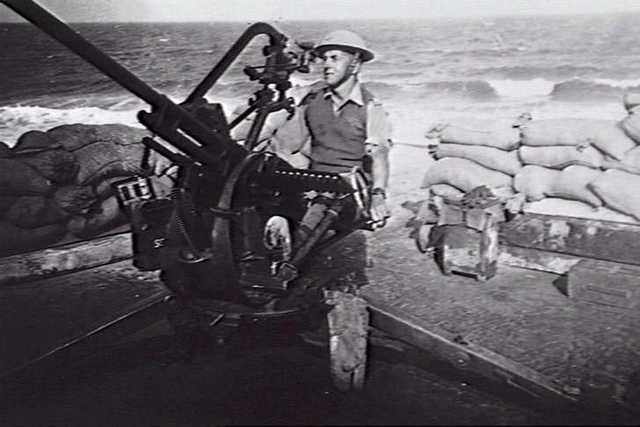
20 mm Breda of the 8th Battery, Australian 2/3 Light Anti-Aircraft Regiment, Derna, Libya, March 1941

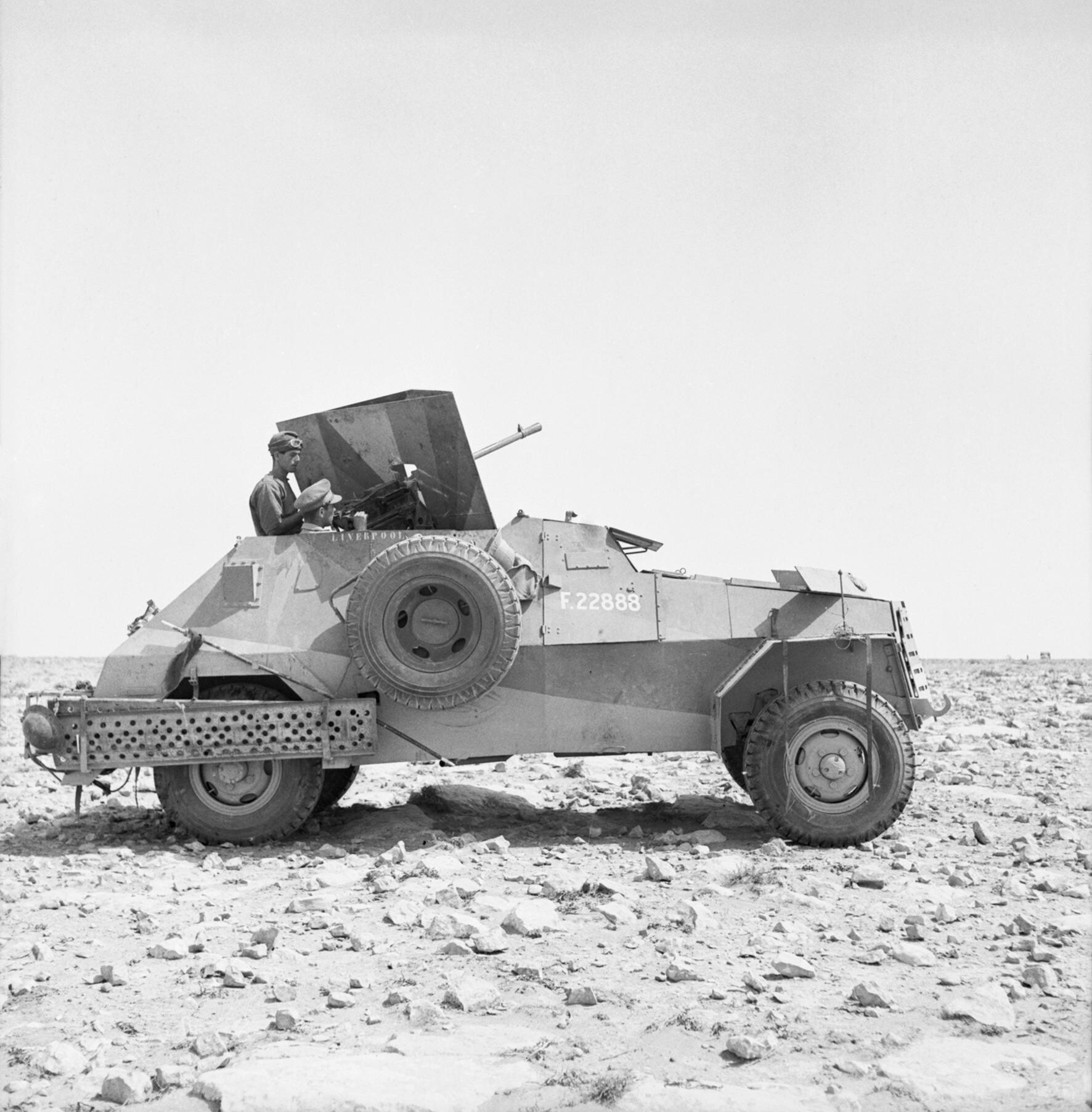
A Marmon-Herrington Mk II armoured car armed with an Italian 20 mm Breda, near Tobruk, Libya, 8 May 1941

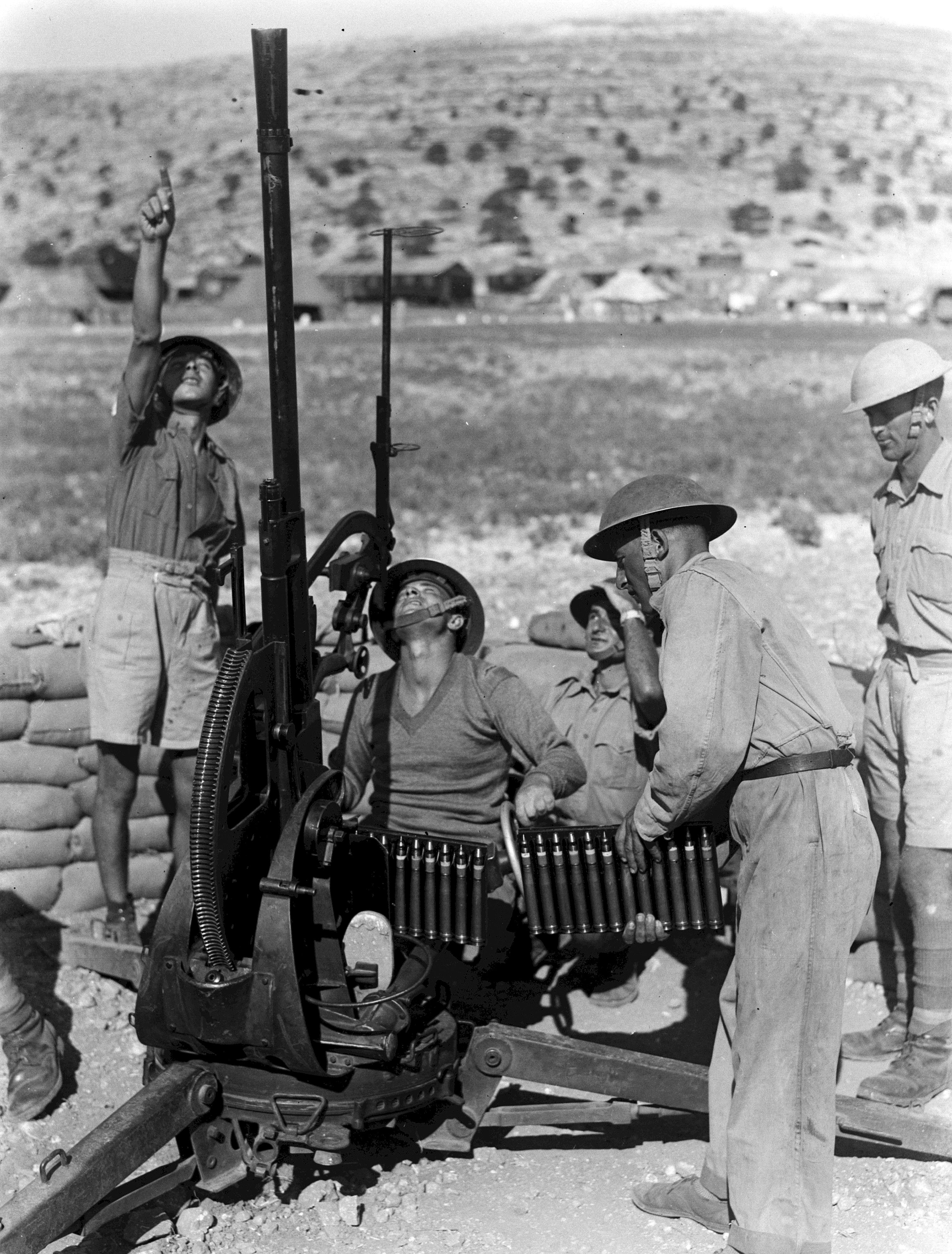
Jewish volunteers in the British Army training with the 20 mm Breda on the Carmel range near Haifa, 20 july 1941

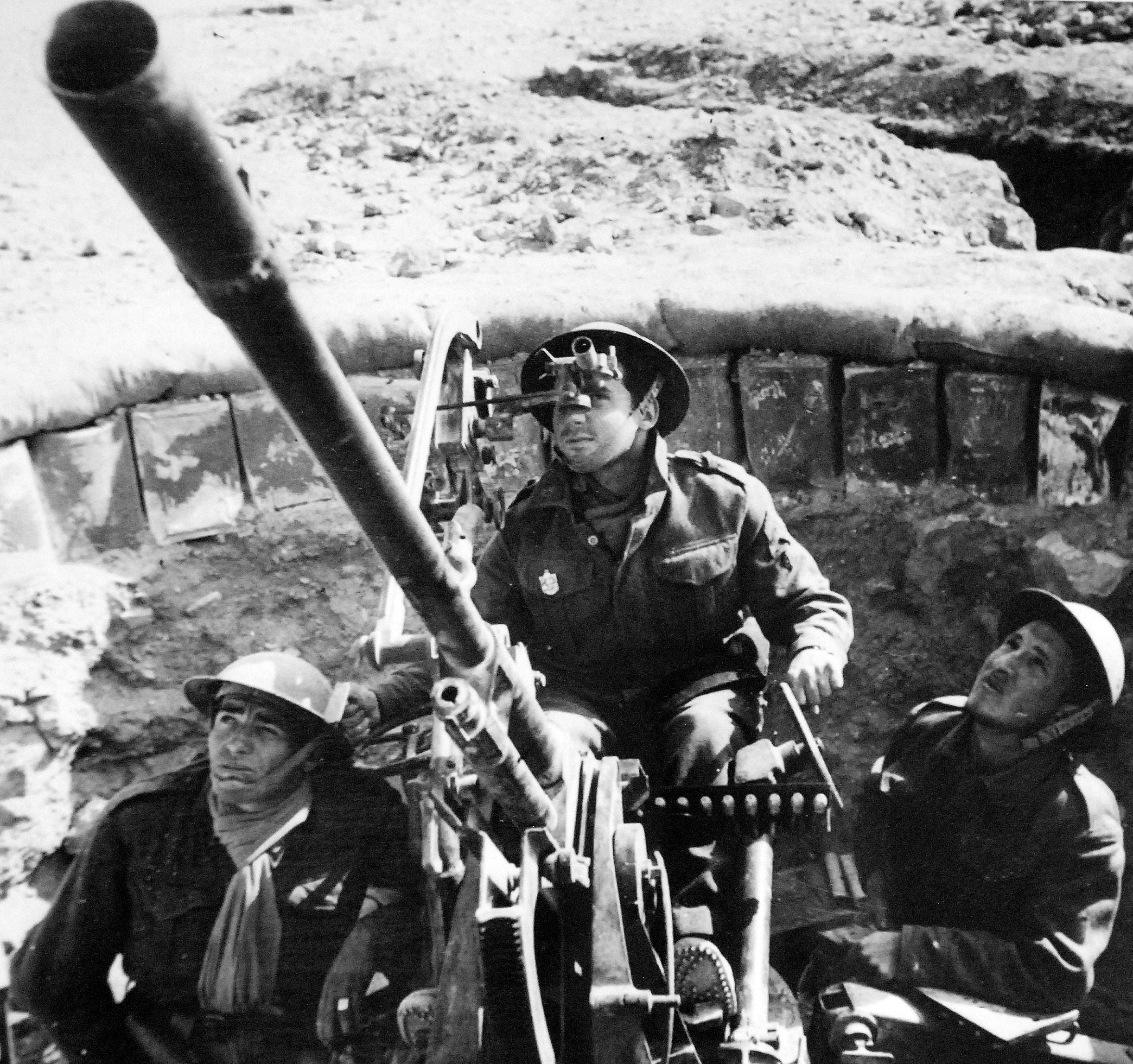
Free French anti-aircraft crew using a captured Italian 20 mm Breda anti-aircraft gun, May 1942

=== China ===
During the Second Sino-Japanese War (World War 2 in China), Chinese Nationalist Army soldiers used the 20 mm Breda during the Battle of Xinkou, shooting down 3 Japanese planes. The 20 mm Breda was not only used in the anti-aircraft role but was also used to destroy Japanese tanks and armored vehicles.

=== Ecuador ===
The Ecuadorian Army bought some Breda guns before the Ecuadorian–Peruvian War but lost 9 of them during the war.

=== Finland ===
After the Winter War had begun, Finland bought 88 Breda guns from Italy, designating them 20 ItK/35 (Finnish: IlmatorjuntaKanuuna, "Anti-Aircraft Cannon" m/1935), the last arriving during the Interim Peace in June 1940. Five of the Finnish Bredas were lost in action during the Continuation War. In addition, the four Italian-built Jymy class motor torpedo boats operated by the Finnish Navy each had one 20 mm Breda cannon on the rear deck.

The Finnish Defence Forces used the 20 Breda as a training weapon for anti-aircraft crews for several decades after the end of World War II. In 1985 there were still 76 guns remaining in the inventory, but all of these were discarded later during that decade.

=== Spain ===
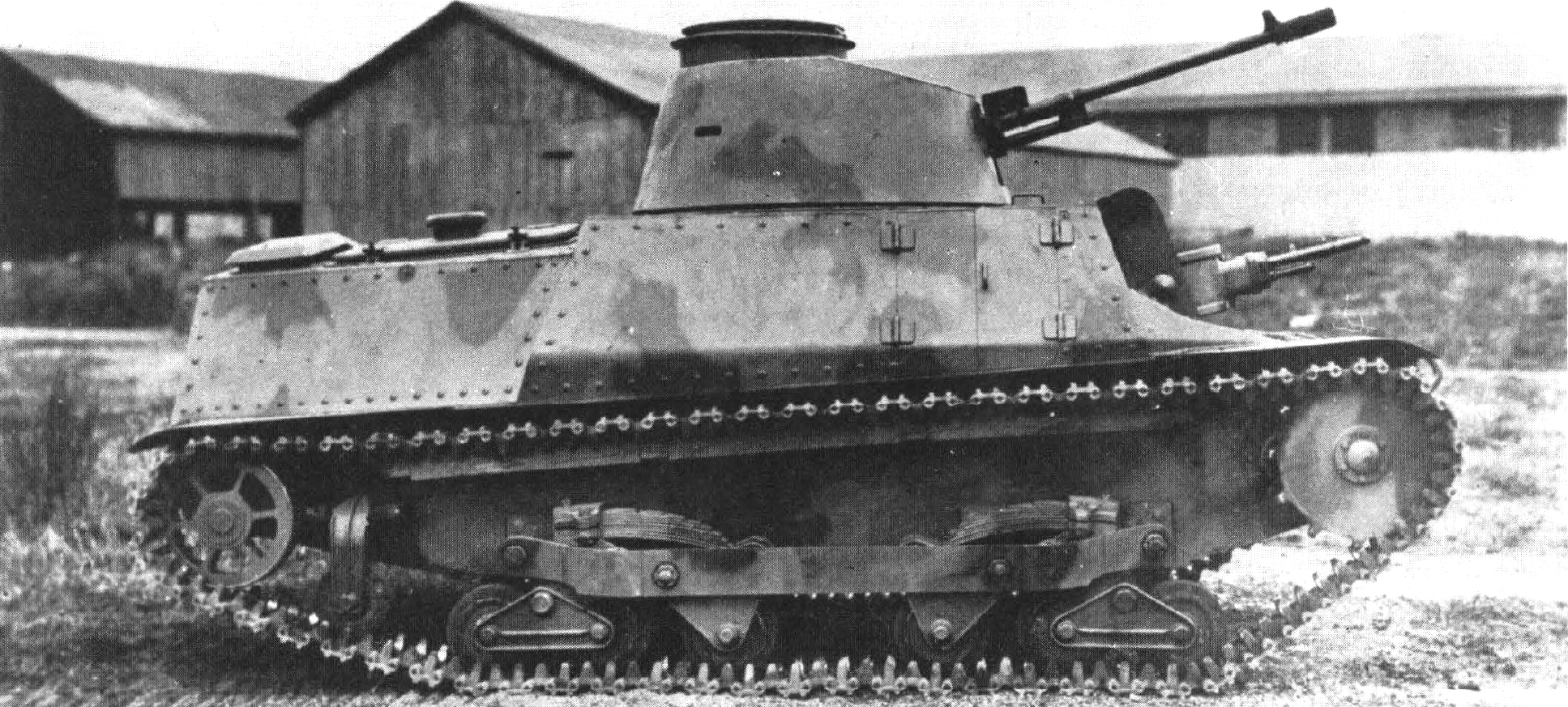
The Carro de Combate de Infantería tipo 1937 infantry tank with a 20 mm Breda in the turret

The gun was used by the Spanish Nationalists during the Spanish Civil War as both an anti-aircraft gun and as an anti-tank gun. In the latter case, it was also used as a tank gun, initially fitted into four converted Panzer Is, in an effort to give them fighting capability against the Soviet T-26s fielded by the Republican forces, as the Panzer I originally only featured two rifle-caliber machine guns. It was also fitted to a prototype infantry tank known as the Carro de Combate de Infantería tipo 1937.

=== Sweden ===
In 1940 the Swedish Navy received a number of Breda 20/65 naval guns as part of their purchase of two Spica-class torpedo boats, in Sweden becoming HSwMS Romulus (27) & HSwMS Remus (28) in the "Romulus-class". In Swedish service the guns were designated 20 mm automatkanon M/38 ("20 mm autocannon model of 1938"), or 20 mm akan M/38 for short. The guns primarily used the Italian naval twin-mount and shared ammunition commonality with the Swedish army's '20 mm akan m/39' (2 cm Flak 30) anti air guns purchased around the same time.

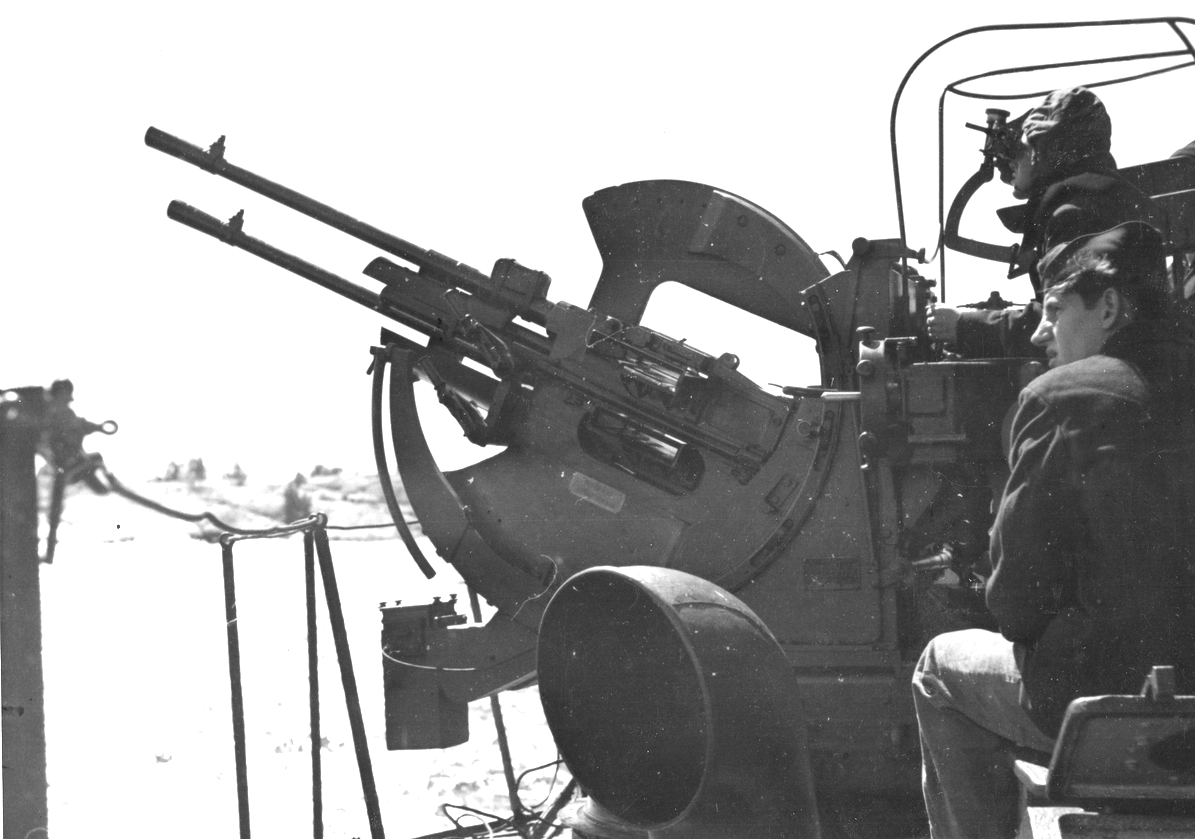
Swedish 20 mm akan M/38 (20/65 Breda in naval twin-mount) on the Italian built HSwMS Remus (28)

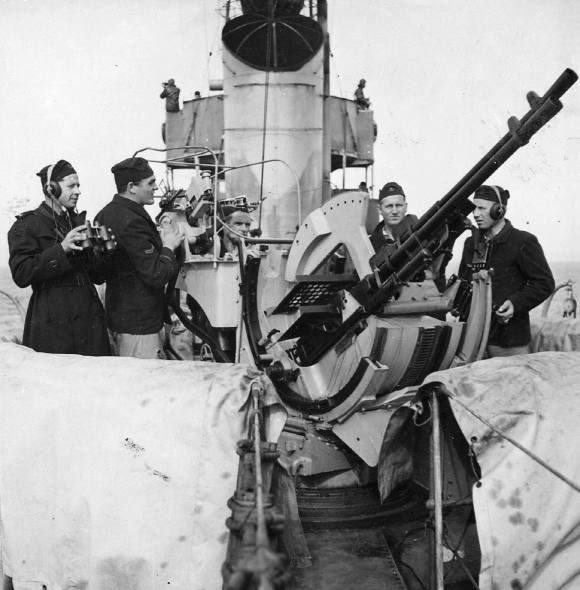
Swedish 20 mm akan M/38 (20/65 Breda in naval twin-mount) on the Italian built HSwMS Romulus (27)

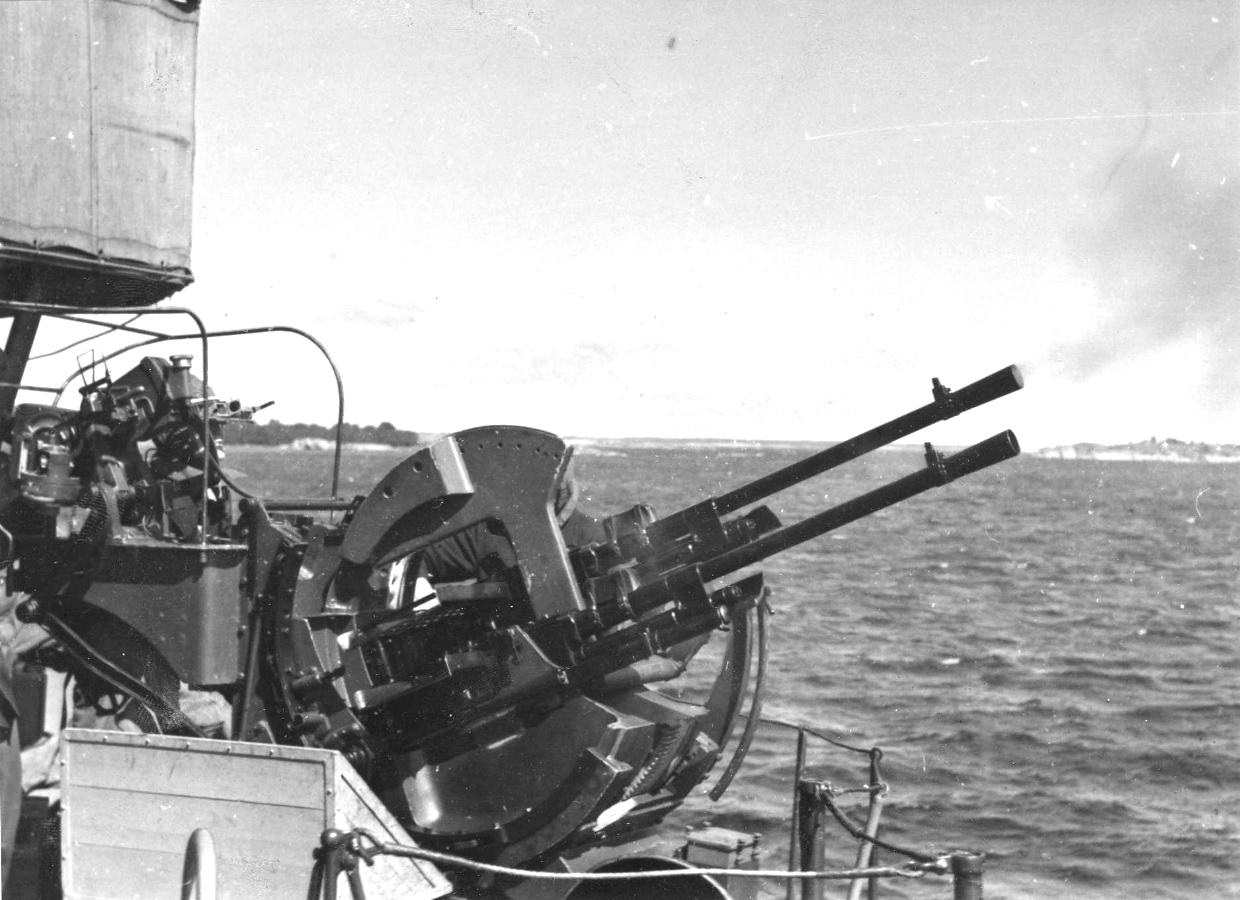
Swedish 20 mm akan M/38 (20/65 Breda in naval twin-mount) on the Italian built HSwMS Remus (28)

=== Yugoslavia ===
The Kingdom of Yugoslavia bought 120 Breda guns in 1939 and they were delivered before the invasion of Yugoslavia.

== See also ==
- Cannone-Mitragliera da 20/70 (Scotti)
