= Carro de Combate de Infantería tipo 1937 =

Carro de Combate de Infantería tipo 1937 (C.C.I. tipo 1937)
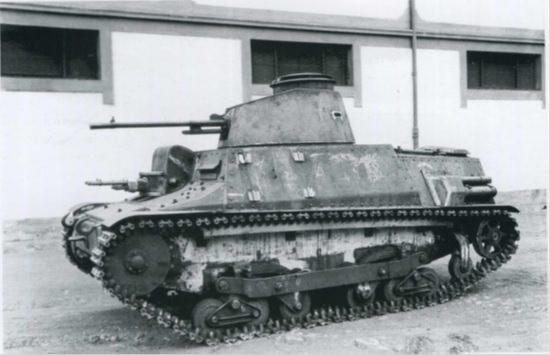
- The sole C.C.I. tipo 1937 prototype.
- Type: Infantry tank
- Place of origin: Francoist Spain

Service history
- Wars: Spanish Civil War

Production history
- Designed: 1937
- Produced: 1937
- No. built: 1

Specifications
- Mass: 8 ton
- Crew: 3: driver, hull gunner, turret gunner
- Main armament: 1 × 20 mm Breda 20/65 mod.35 autocannon
- Secondary armament: 2 × 7.92 mm Hotchkiss Mod. 1914 machine gun
- Engine: 6 cylinder MAN; 100 hp
- Power/weight: 12.5 hp/t
- Maximum speed: 24 kilometres per hour (15 mph)

The Carro de Combate de Infantería tipo 1937 ("Infantry Tank type 1937" in Spanish), often shortened to C.C.I. tipo 1937, was an attempt by the Spanish Nationalists during the Spanish Civil War to create an modern indigenous tank by cannibalising older existing tank stocks. It was armed with a Breda 20/65 mod.35 autocannon in a fully rotating turret, as well as two machine guns in the forward hull. It was overly optimistic and hastily designed, resulting in a problematic design that never entered mass production. Only one prototype was built.

== Gallery ==
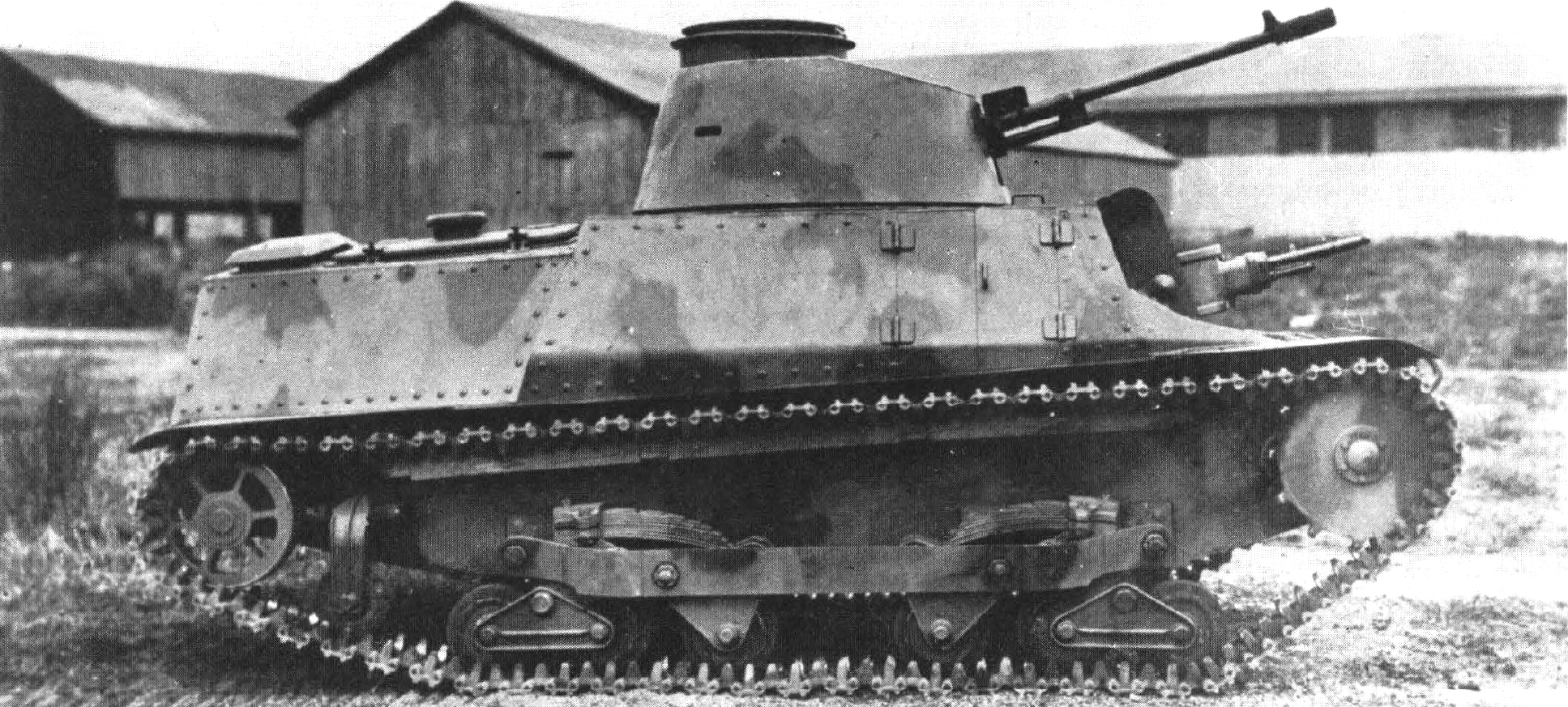
C.C.I. tipo 1937 prototype from the right

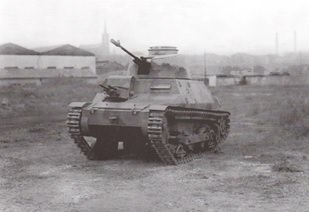
C.C.I. tipo 1937 prototype from the front

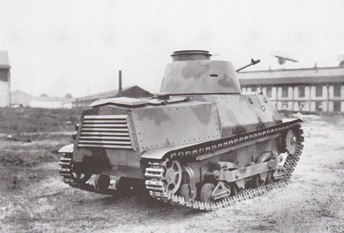
C.C.I. tipo 1937 prototype from the back

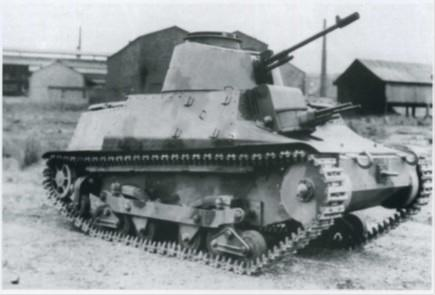
C.C.I. tipo 1937 prototype from the left
