= Trubia A4 =

Spanish light tank

- An image of the Trubia A4, illustrating the improved turret concept
- Type: Light tank
- Place of origin: Spain

Service history
- Used by: Spain
- Wars: Spanish Civil War

Production history
- Manufacturer: Fábrica de Armas de Trubia
- Produced: 1926–1934
- No. built: 4

Specifications
- Mass: 9 tons
- Length: 17 ft 8 in (5.4 m)
- Width: 5 ft 9 in (1.7 m)
- Height: 9 ft (2.7 m)
- Crew: 3
- Armor: 12–16 mm
- Main armament: 3 x .303 in (7.7 mm) Hotchkiss machine guns
- Engine: 75 hp (56 kW)
- Operational range: 100 km or 62 miles
- Maximum speed: 19 mph (30 km/h)

The Trubia A4 was a Spanish experimental light tank developed during the 1920s by the Fábrica de Armas de Trubia. Based on experience gained with the Renault FT during the Rif War, it was intended to provide the Spanish Army with the first domestically produced tank. Four prototypes were built between 1926 and 1934. Although several innovative features were introduced, it never entered production. The surviving vehicles saw limited service during the Spanish Civil War.

== History ==
=== Development ===
Due to their experiences in the Rif War, the Spanish Army decided to fund a development program for a new Spanish light tank. The new vehicle was to be based on the Renault FT, which was the most numerous armored vehicle in service with the Spanish Army at the time and one of the most widely used by foreign armies. The program was spearheaded by Captain of the Artillery Carlos Ruiz de Toledo, who had first commanded the battery of Schneider CA1 assault tanks in Morocco; Toledo felt that the tank would become an extremely important asset in future conflicts and felt that the Spanish Army required a Spanish-built model. As a result, he toured a number of European states in an effort to collect information on new trends in tank design and attempt to integrate these into the Spanish tank program. The first prototype began to be developed in 1925. It was produced in the Trubia Artillery Factory (Fábrica de Artillería Trubia), in Asturias, The resulting tank was known as the Carro de Combate Trubia serie A, or the "Series A Trubia tank". The tank was powered by a four-cylinder Hispano-Suiza 40/50 engine, the same engine the Spanish Army's military trucks had been equipped with since 1915. Given the Spanish Army's opinion that the FT was limited in firepower, the Trubia tank featured a special turret. The turret was designed in two articulated halves, which could traverse independently, each armed with a machine gun. Theoretically, if one of the machine guns jammed, the tank would still have another one to defend itself with. Furthermore, the vehicle's hull was provided with firing ports, to allow the crew to fire small arms from within the tank. This prototype was put through a series of tests, and its success brought about the decision to continue development on a Spanish tank, leading to an improved Trubia tank design, known as the Modelo Trubia 75HP, tipo rápido, serie A (Model Trubia 75 hp, fast tank, series A).

While touring Europe for a second time, in an attempt to integrate foreign design trends into the new Trubia, Captain Ruiz de Toledo found a new type of track system in Germany. Designed to avoid having problems with the tracks coming off the vehicle, the new design substituted the traditional tracks with a system which was held together by a lateral metal wall, with the roadwheels suspended from the chassis. The track system was the most innovative and unique part of the new Trubia light tank. Apart from the new tracks, the Trubia was to have a greater velocity (at least 30 km/h (19 mph)) and greater road range than the FT. While a new machine gun was installed on the glacis plate, the tank's crew was increased from two to three, which caused the hull to be enlarged; this also allowed the engine to be maintained from inside the vehicle, allowing the crew to fix small breakdowns in the field. To refrigerate the engine and the crew, a compressed air dispenser was installed inside the chassis. This solved problems dealing with the crew's claustrophobia and the intake of gasses originating from the engine found in the FT, and made crewing the tank much more ergonomic. The original 50 horsepower (37 kW) was replaced with a more powerful 75 horsepower (56 kW) Daimler four cylinder engine. The transmission had four forward gears and four reverse gears. The new tank proved satisfactory—and even bettered the FT in some aspects—and the Spanish Army ordered the construction of four prototypes. The first prototype was manufactured in 1926. A total of four prototypes were ordered, but production was slow and by 1928 only one of the tanks had been completed, while the other three prototypes were not armed. The completed vehicle, called the Trubia A4, was sent to the Firing School where it was put through numerous tests. In 1931, a second prototype was completed, while the final two were completed in 1934. The original prototype was returned to the factory in 1935, to integrate a number of modernizations and to repair any damage which the vehicle endured during the testing process. The other three tanks were issued to the Milan Infantry Regiment, in Oviedo, where they continued testing.

=== Combat ===
In the Spanish Civil War, the three Trubia A4 prototypes issued to the Milan Infantry Regiment at Oviedo were turned over to the Nationalist uprising during the siege, while the fourth prototype located in the Trubia Factory was taken by the factory's workers and quickly repaired so that it could be pressed into service in the Republican Army. One of the Nationalist ones was blown up by its crew after developing mechanical troubles at Argañosa to prevent its capture. The two surviving tanks were last used against another attempted Republican assault on Oviedo In February 1937, when they spearheaded a successful counterattack in the area of Postigo.

=== Fate ===
It is unknown what happened to the rest of them after the war although they were likely scrapped, however a running replica was built for the Museo de la Historia Militar Española, el Cueto in Asturias.
