= Tanks in the Spanish Army =

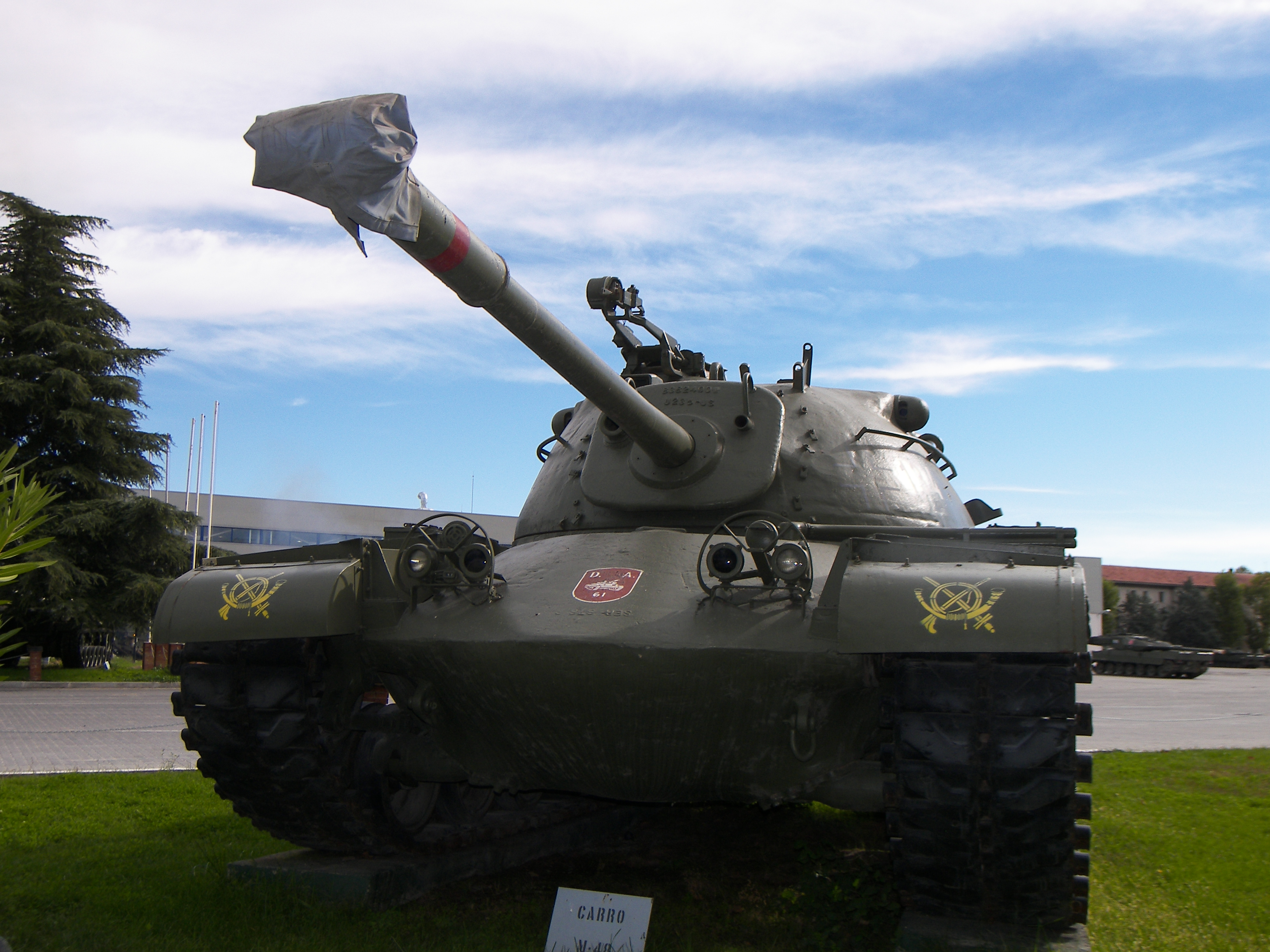
An M48 Patton tank of the Spanish Army on display at the El Goloso Museum of Armored Vehicles in October 2007.

Tanks in the Spanish Army have over 90 years of history, from the French Renault FTs first delivered in 1919 to the Leopard 2 and B1 Centauro models of the early 21st century. The Spanish FTs took part in combat during the Rif War and participated in the first amphibious landing with tanks in history, at Alhucemas. In 1925, the Spanish Army began to undertake a program to develop and produce a Spanish tank, an upgraded version of the Renault FT, called the Trubia A4. Although the prototype performed well during testing, the tank was never put into mass production. Spain also experimented with the Italian Fiat 3000, acquiring one tank in 1925, and with another indigenous tank program called the Landesa. However, none of these evolved into a major armor program, and as a result the FT remained the most important tank, in numbers, in the Spanish Army until the beginning of the Spanish Civil War.

Between July 1936 and April 1939, during the Spanish Civil War, the two opposing armies received large quantities of tanks from foreign powers. Spain's Second Republic received tanks from the Soviet Union, many of which were captured by the Nationalists and pressed into service against their former masters, while the Nationalists were aided by the Germans and Italians. The Spanish Civil War, although the testing grounds for the nations which would ultimately take part in World War II, proved inconclusive with regard to the proof of mechanized warfare. Despite attempts by Soviet, German and Italian advisers and soldiers to use newly devised mechanized theories, the lack of quality crews and the tanks, and the insufficient number of tanks provided bad impressions on the usefulness of tanks on their own.

The Spanish Army ended the Spanish Civil War with a fleet of light tanks. Looking to field more modern and capable tanks, the Spanish government and army approved a venture to design and manufacture a better light tank, known as the Verdeja. Although the tank proved extremely capable, a lack of raw materials and incentives doomed the program to failure. Furthermore, the army's requirements were temporarily satisfied by the procurement of Panzer IVs in late 1943. However, the failure to acquire more Panzer IVs led Spain to field a largely antiquated collection of light tanks and an insufficient number of medium tanks. In 1953, the United States and Spain signed a military aid program agreement which led to the supply of M47 Patton and M48 Patton tanks. The American decision to not allow Spain to deploy the new equipment during the war with Morocco caused Spain to look elsewhere for a supplement to their fleet of Patton tanks, ending with the procurement of the AMX-30E, based on the French AMX-30.

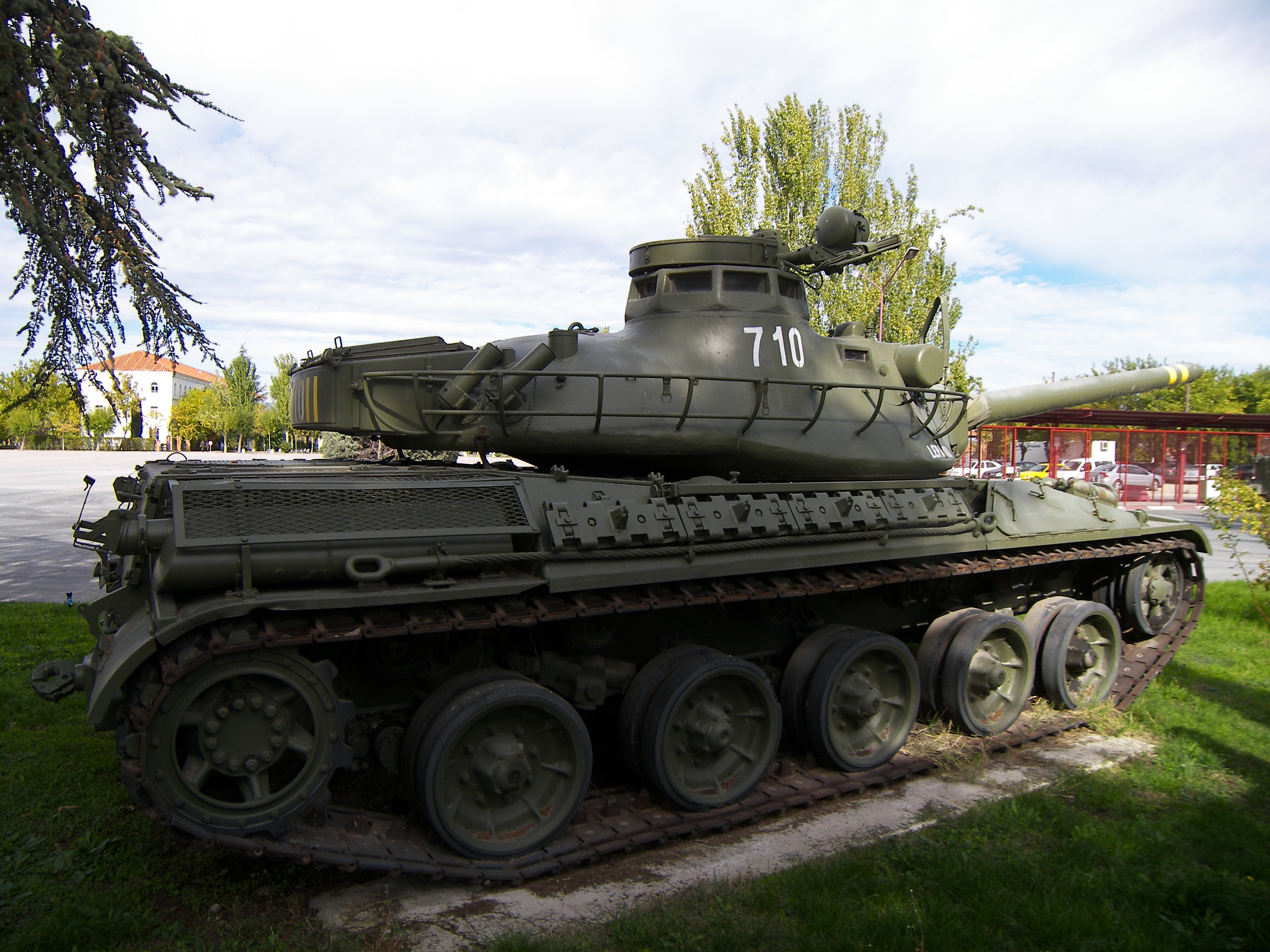
An AMX-30E tank on display at El Goloso

Almost immediately after, the Spanish Army and the Spanish Ministry of Defense began to look for a future Spanish tank. This turned into the Lince tank program. Despite numerous bids the Lince program failed, both for financial reasons and because of the decision to instead modernize the existing fleet of AMX-30Es, and to procure a large number of American M60 Patton tanks to replace the fleet of older Patton tanks. Over half of the AMX-30Es were upgraded to a standard known as the AMX-30EM2, while the rest suffered a more finite modification known as the AMX-30EM1. However, the M60s and modernized AMX-30Es did not provide Spain with a sufficiently modern tank for the next century. In 1994, the Spanish Ministry of Defense began to negotiate with the German government over the purchase of the Leopard 2. Ultimately, 108 Leopard 2A4s were procured and integrated into the Spanish Army, while 219 Leopard 2Es were built in Spain, based on the German Leopard 2A6. The Leopard 2E and Leopard 2A4 replaced the fleet of M60 Patton tanks, while Spain's AMX-30EM2s were replaced by Italian B1 Centauro anti-tank cavalry vehicles. Presently, the Spanish Army possesses 108 Leopard 2A4s and 219 Leopard 2Es.

== Birth of the Spanish tank force: 1919–1926 ==
=== Background ===
Before the First World War, the Spanish Army bought a unarmored Schneider-Brillié truck in 1909 to be used in Melilla, where armed conflict with local tribes was going on. This was a French bus platform that was fitted with an armoured body in Spain, to be used as troop transport. Although the Schneider-Brillié model 1909 was big, slow and its performance was not good, the Spanish Army learned the value of armored vehicles and bought a second one. Spanish Army officers appreciated the advantages of using advanced weapons technology in the Colonial War in Spanish Morocco and followed First World War advances.

=== First purchases ===
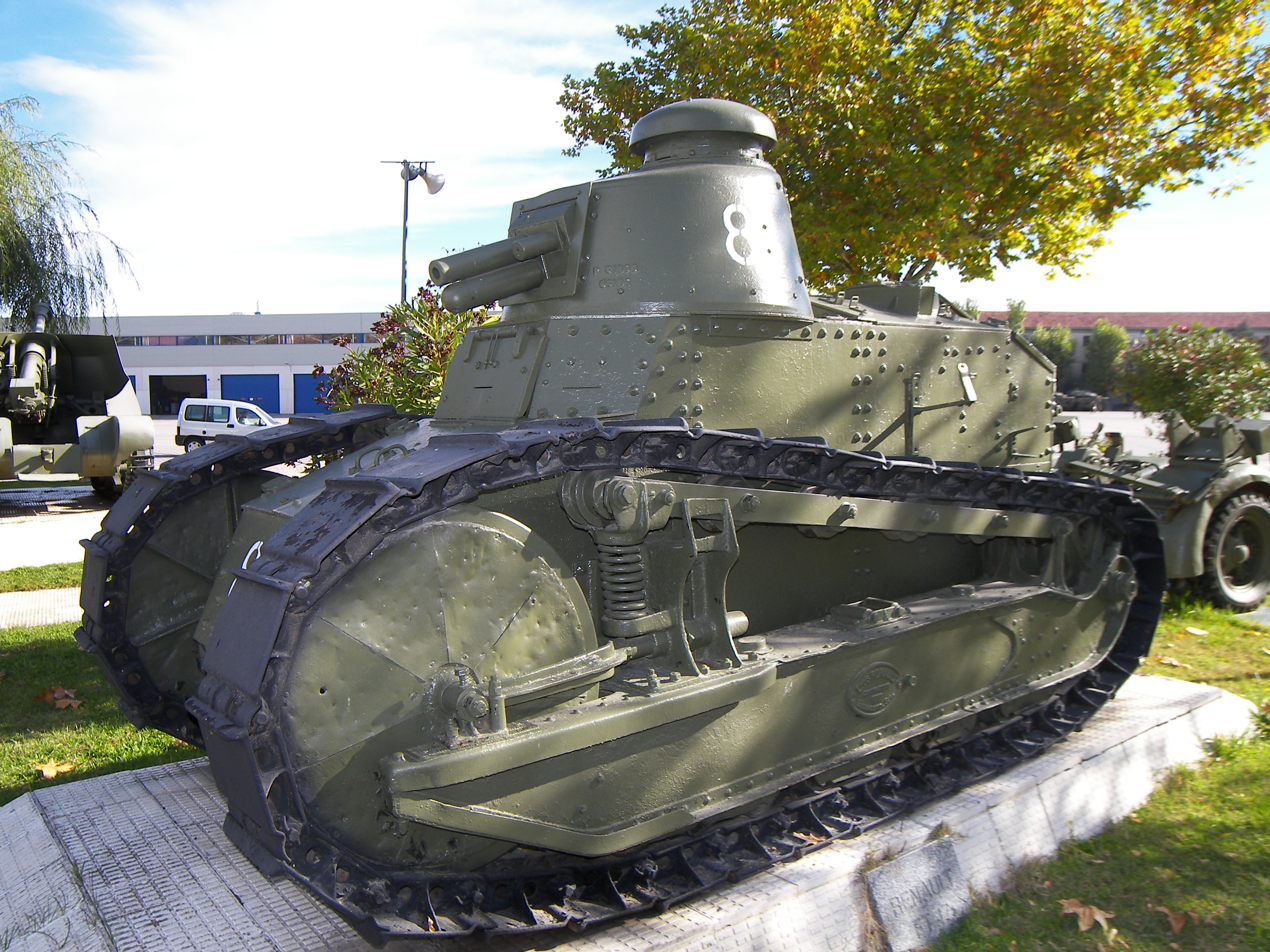
Renault FT of the Spanish Army, at the El Goloso Museum of Armored Vehicles

The Spanish army's interest in the tank began near the end of World War I, when a formal petition for one Renault FT light tank was made to the French government on 28 October 1918. This purchase, however, was not processed until 15 January 1919. Spain's Comisión de Experiencias, Proyectos y Comprobación del Material de Guerra (Experiences, Projects and Confirmation Commission) issued a formal order for an FT, armed with a 37-millimeter (1.5 in) cannon, and days later extended the order to include another three cannon armed tanks, and another FT armed with a machine gun. On 5 March the order was authorized and then extended further to include two more FTs, armed with the 37-millimeter (1.5 in) cannon. On 20 March the French government declared that they could not process the sale, and on 12 April the process to acquire these vehicles began anew.

In May 1919, the French acceded to the sale of a single FT light tank to the Spanish Army, delivered the next month. This particular FT was armed with an 8-millimeter (0.31 in) Hotchkiss machine gun, and was later re-armed with a Spanish 7-millimeter (0.28 in) machine gun. Upon inspection by the Spanish government, it was decided to procure another ten—including eight armed with machine guns and two armed with cannons. The French government declared that there were no vehicles available for sale, and later added that under no circumstances would they allow Spain to rearm these vehicles with the Spanish 7 millimeters (0.28 in) machine gun, and consequently denied the sale. As a result, Spain began to approach other governments, including Great Britain and the United States, but with no success.

=== Rif War ===
Following Spain's colonial defeat at the Battle of Annual, on 22 July 1921, another military envoy was sent to France to petition for more tanks. This time, the French government consented and agreed to the sale of ten machine gun armed FTs and a single command tank. The command tank was an FT chassis, with the turret replaced by a superstructure, carrying a single communications radio. These were presented to the third section of the Escuela Central de Tiro, or the Central Shooting School, on 12 January 1922, and organized into a company of twelve light tanks. In September 1921, the Spanish government also procured six Schneider CA1 tanks and deployed these to Morocco as early as 28 February 1922. On 13 March 1922, six FTs were unloaded at Melilla, as well.

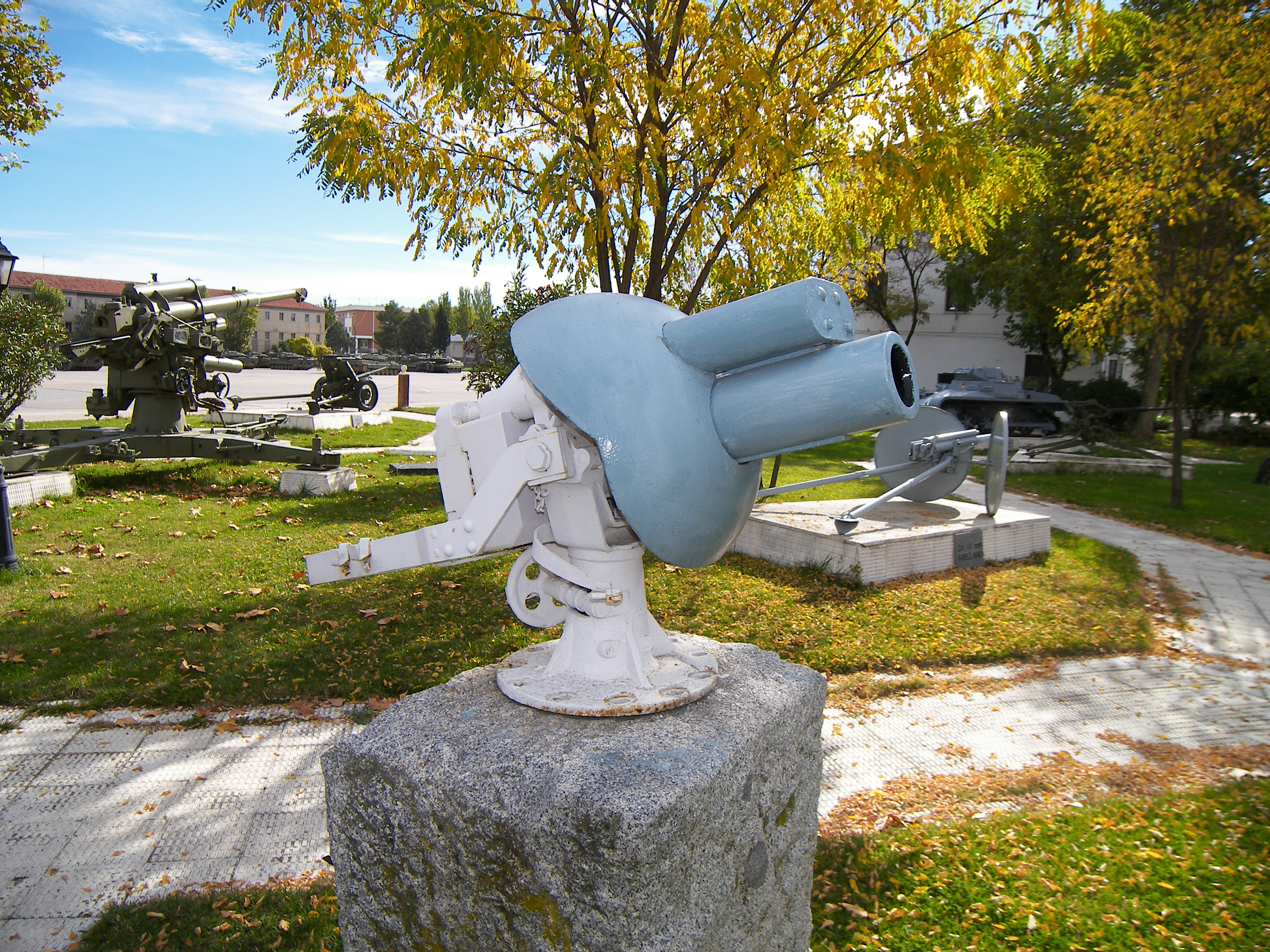
Lone surviving piece of a Schneider CA1 tank used by the Spanish Army

On 18 March 1922, the company of FT light tanks took part in its first combat operation, during the Rif War. Ordered to operate with the Spanish Legion, the force was to capture the town of Tunguntz, in Northern Morocco. Surprising the defenders with their appearance, the armored company advanced, and the legionnaires behind, and captured the town of Anvar. Advancing towards Tunguntz, the tanks began to come under heavy fire, as their advance had isolated them from the legionnaires due to the speed. As a result, the tanks were forced to withdraw to Anvar to fall back on the protection of the infantry. Two FTs were abandoned by their crew because of mechanical problems and were later destroyed by the Moroccan defenders with dynamite. A post-action analysis of the action decided that the poor performance of the tanks company was a direct result of poor cooperation with the infantry, the lack of reliability of the tanks' machine guns and the lack of prior training before being rushed to the front. Thereafter, Spain's armored company was used almost continuously in small-scale operations between late 1922 and September 1925. On 8 September 1925, Spain's armor would take part in the first amphibious landing with tanks in history.

After being refitted with brand new FTs to replace losses incurred during the three years of operations in Morocco, the tank company was transferred to Ceuta to prepare for the amphibious operations planned to place in and around Al Hoceima Bay. In the days previous to the Alhucemas landing, the armored company took part in a number of training exercises, with four K-type landing craft, specially modified to allow them to carry three tanks each. However, on the day of the landings the landing craft hit a shoal 50 meters (55 yd) from the beach; as a result, the armored company was not able to land until the next day, on 9 September 1925. Upon landing, the vehicles were used to support the left flank of the Spanish attack and aided in the capture of the heights surrounding the beaches and controlling the exit points towards the inland.

The Rif War came to an end in May 1926, and the armored company was relocated to the Spanish mainland in July of that year.

== Early indigenous tank development programs: 1925–1935 ==
With their experiences in Morocco, the Spanish Army decided to fund a development program for a new Spanish light tank. The new vehicle was to be based on the Renault FT, which was the most numerous armored vehicle in service with the Spanish Army at the time and one of the most widely used by foreign armies. The program was spearheaded by Captain of the Artillery Carlos Ruiz de Toledo, who had first commanded the battery of Schneider CA1 assault tanks in Morocco; Toledo felt that the tank would become an extremely important asset in future conflicts and felt that the Spanish Army required a Spanish-built model. As a result, he toured a number of European states in an effort to collect information on new trends in tank design and attempt to integrate these into the Spanish tank program. The resulting tank was known as the Carro de Combate Trubia serie A, or the "Series A Trubia Tank".

=== Trubia light tank ===
The first prototype development began in 1925. Produced in the Trubia Artillery Factory (Fábrica de Artillería Trubia), in Asturias, the tank was powered by a four-cylinder Hispano-Suiza 40/50 engine, the same engine the Spanish Army's military trucks had been equipped with since 1915. Given the Spanish Army's opinion that the FT was limited in firepower, the Trubia tank featured a special turret. The turret was designed in two articulated halves, which could traverse independently, each armed with a machine gun. Theoretically, if one of the machine guns jammed, the tank would still have another one to defend itself with. Furthermore, the vehicle's hull was provided with firing ports, to allow the crew to fire small arms from within the tank. This prototype was put through a series of tests, and its success brought about the decision to continue development on a Spanish tank, leading to an improved Trubia tank design, known as the Modelo Trubia 75HP, tipo rápido, serie A (Model Trubia 75 hp, fast tank, series A).

While touring Europe for a second time, in an attempt to integrate foreign design trends into the new Trubia, Captain Ruiz de Toledo found a new type of track system in Germany. Designed to avoid having problems with the tracks coming off the vehicle, the new design substituted the traditional tracks with a system which was held together by a lateral metal wall, with the roadwheels suspended from the chassis. The track system was the most innovative and unique part of the new Trubia light tank. Apart from the new tracks, the Trubia was to have a greater velocity (at least 30 kilometers per hour (19 mph)) and greater road range than the FT. While a new machine gun was installed on the glacis plate, the tank's crew was increased from two to three, which caused the hull to be enlarged; this also allowed the engine to be maintained from inside the vehicle, allowing the crew to fix small breakdowns in the field. To refrigerate the engine and the crew, a compressed air dispenser was installed inside the chassis. This solved problems dealing with the crew's claustrophobia and the intake of gasses originating from the engine found in the FT, and made crewing the tank much more ergonomic. The original 50 horsepower (37 kW) was replaced with a more powerful 75 horsepower (56 kW) Daimler four cylinder engine. The transmission had four forward gears and four reverse gears. The new tank proved satisfactory—and even bettered the FT in some aspects—and the Spanish Army ordered the construction of four prototypes.

The first prototype was manufactured in 1926. A total of four prototypes were ordered, but production was slow and by 1928 only one of the tanks had been completed, while the other three prototypes were not armed. The completed vehicle, called the Trubia A4, was sent to the Firing School where it was put through a series of tests. In 1931, a second prototype was completed, while the final two were completed in 1934. The original prototype was returned to the factory in 1935, to integrate a number of modernizations and to repair any damage which was done to the vehicle during the testing process. The other three tanks were issued to the Milan Infantry Regiment, in Oviedo, where they continued testing.

=== Other tank programs ===
While the Trubia was being developed, the Spanish Army acquired an Italian Fiat 3000A. Ordered in October 1924, it was received in January 1925, and assigned to the Central Firing School. There, it went through a series of experiments and tests. The tank was originally developed as a near copy of the Renault FT, of which Italy had previously attempted to procure one hundred units. It had a smaller chassis and was powered through a 50 horsepower (37 kW) engine. The FIAT 3000A had a turret with two 6.5-millimeter (0.26 in) machine guns; this was later improved with a 37-millimeter (1.5 in) cannon and designated the FIAT 3000B.

In 1928, the Trubia Factory, under Major of the Artillery Victor Landesa Domenech, designed and began production of a prototype of a new armored tractor; these were named after him, as the Landesa. The unarmed tractor finished production in 1930 and went through a series of tests. Between 1931 and 1932 the vehicle went through a series of upgrades in the factory and was later sent to Madrid for further testing, where it passed satisfactorily in April 1932. Landesa, who had at this time been promoted to Lieutenant Colonel, began a preseries of three vehicles, motored by the L-2000 55 horsepower (41 kW) engine, designed by Daimler-Benz. Ultimately, two were produced and set for testing with the Spanish Republican Army, and another nine were ordered with the idea of using them to tow Škoda 76.5-millimeter (3.01 in) anti-aircraft cannons. All the while, the Trubia Factory began to plan an armored and armed version of the vehicle for the Spanish Army. Two were produced by 1934, although the Trubia Factory experienced troubles in producing the L-2000 engines; as a result, they were not powered by the beginning of the Spanish Civil War in 1936. They were armed with a single 7-millimeter (0.28 in) machine gun.

== Tanks during the Spanish Civil War: 1936–1939 ==
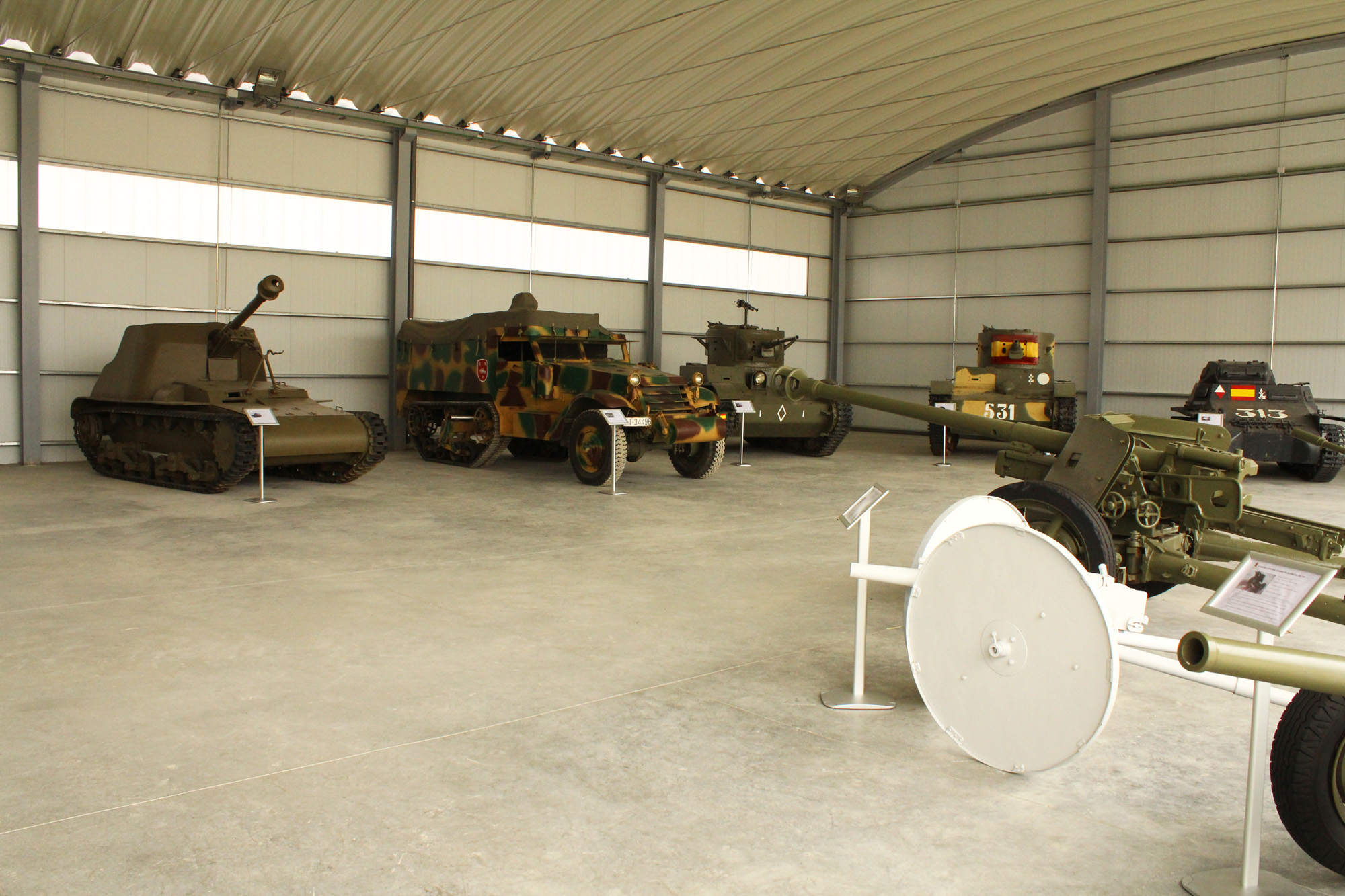
Some of the tanks used during the Spanish Civil War at the Museum of Armored Media located at the El Goloso military base (Madrid). In the background two T-26s, each with a color scheme (Republican/Nationalist) and on the right a Panzer I. On the far left a Verdeja.

At the start of the Spanish Civil War, the Spanish Army counted on a total of ten Renault FTs in working condition distributed equally amongst two light tank regiments; one in Madrid and the other in Sevilla. The former (1st Light Tank Regiment) fell under the control of the Second Spanish Republic's army, while the 2nd Light Tank Regiment (in Zaragoza) was integrated into the Nationalist army. The lone Fiat 3000A is thought to have been in service at this time, but was cannibalized for parts. Spain's six Schneider CA1 assault tanks were put into service with the Republican Army, and saw combat around Madrid before and during the siege of Madrid, and during the siege of the Alcázar in Toledo. They were destroyed during the siege of Madrid. The three Trubia A4 prototypes issued to the Milan Infantry Regiment at Oviedo were turned over to the Nationalist uprising, while the fourth prototype located in the Trubia Factory was taken by the factory's workers and quickly repaired so that it could be pressed into service in the Republican Army. A Landesa armored tractor in Trubia was also modified by the Republicans to carry on machine guns and converted into a light tank.

=== Armor of the Popular Front (Spanish Republic Government) ===
Spain's Republican Forces fabricated a number of different armored vehicles throughout the war. Although serving little military purpose, due to the poor quality of their design and construction, they were important factors in lifting the Popular Front's military's morale. Factories in the northern areas of Spain produced a fair number of armored tractors and trucks; for example, sixteen armored vehicles, denominated Naval-Somua, were manufactured based on the chassis of the French Somua bus. The Trubia Factory, at this time working for the Republic, manufactured between 15 and 20 light tanks known as the Trubia-Naval, which were heavily influenced by the Landesa and the Trubia A4. However, most construction revolved around the armoring of trucks, known as Tiznaos for the grey color of their steel armor. Due to the weight of the armor and the low power output of their engines, many were not able to move more than 20 meters (22 yd) without breaking down. These were mostly constructed in the heavily industrialized regions in northern Spain and in Catalonia. The factories of Levante, under Soviet guidance, built what was considered to be one of the best armored trucks of the war—the UNL-35. These vehicles were based on the Soviet ZiS-5 truck, and were fabricated between early 1937 and March 1939 at a rate of no more than five per month. Also, based on other chassis, such as Ford's model 817T, around 120 UNL-35s were manufactured.

T-26 shipments during the Spanish Civil War
Date	Ship	Number of vehicles	Additional information
15 October 1936	Komsomol	50	Led by Lieutenant Colonel Krivoshein
30 November 1936	Cabo Palos	37	Led by General D.G. Pavlov
30 November 1936	Mar Caribe	19	
6 March 1937	Cabo Santo Tomé	60	
8 March 1937	Darro	40	
7 May 1937	Cabo Palos	50	
13 March 1938	Gravelines	25	Last shipment received

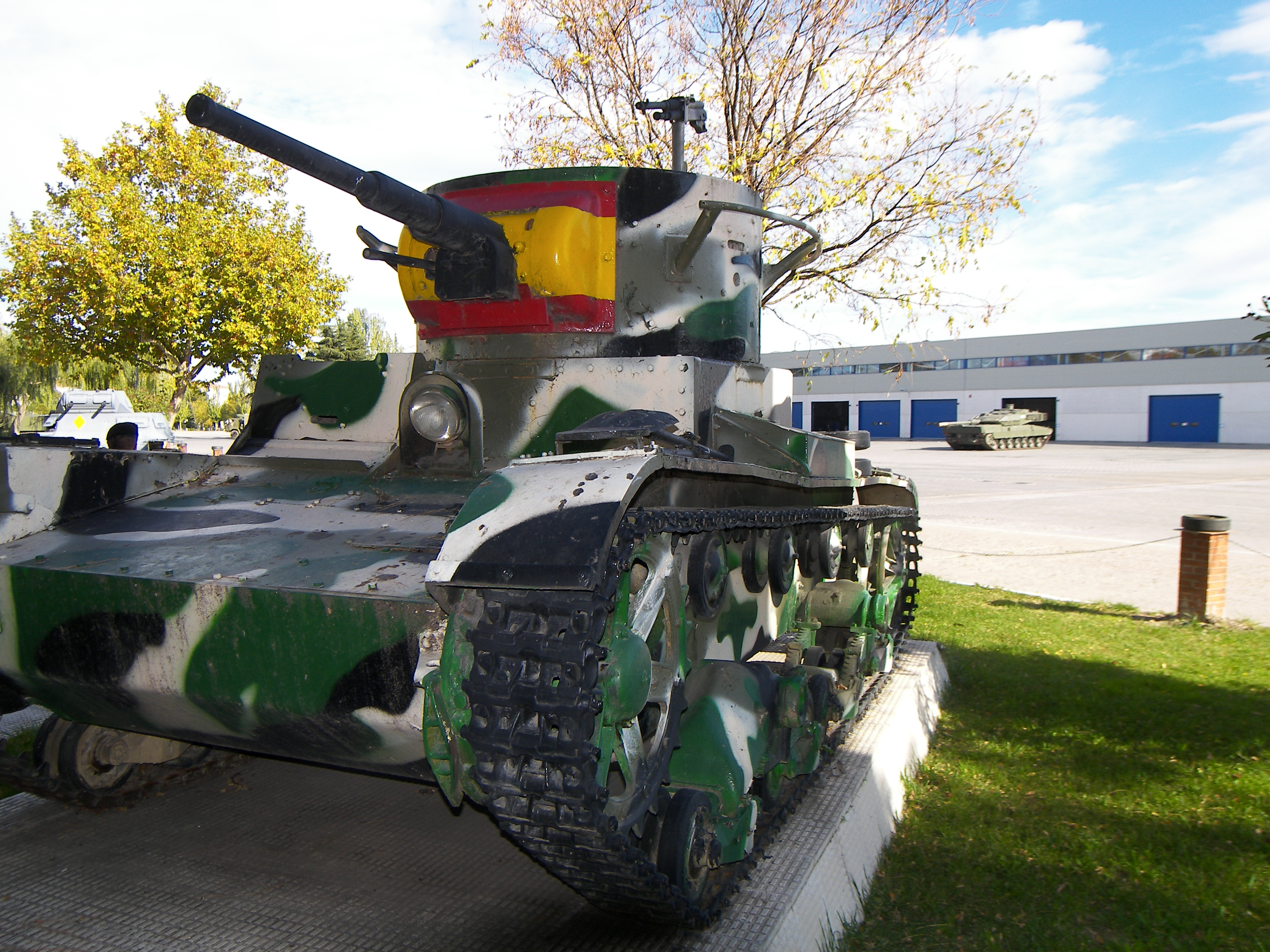
Soviet T-26 supplied to the Popular Army during the Spanish Civil War (see also Combat history of the T-26)

On 15 October 1936, the first shipment of 50 Soviet T-26 light tanks arrived at Cartagena. These were put into combat as early as 26 October, under the leadership of Soviet Lieutenant Colonel Semyon Krivoshein, south of Madrid. The first combat operation in Spain for the T-26 was near the town of Seseña, when a Republican tank company counterattacked against the spearhead of the Nationalist's drive towards Madrid. The counterattack, although partially successful, did not hinder the Nationalist advance. By the beginning of the operation, the tanks had separated themselves from the infantry, following them. However, the Republican armor successfully surprised a company of Nationalist infantrymen, who had mistaken them for Italian allies, and routed them. The tank company then continued towards the town of Esquivias, to the West, where they were counterattacked by cavalry from the Moroccan Legion and finally forced to withdraw. Lacking infantry support, a number of T-26s were knocked out by Nationalist infantrymen using wine bottles as bomblets. The tank company returned through Seseña, which had been reoccupied by Nationalist infantry, and came under heavy fire. Despite the withdrawal, the counterattack was heavily publicized in Madrid, by the Republic, as a victory. The lack of success is attributed to the lack of coordination between Republican tanks, infantry and artillery. Although it is commonly mentioned that Spain received 312 T-26s, this number includes 16 FTs, delivered by Poland, and 15 T-26s which never actually made it to Spain. Ultimately, 281 T-26s were delivered to Spain during the Spanish Civil War.

The Soviet Union also supplied Spain with 50 BT-5 tanks. Although slightly heavier than the T-26, the BT-5 was faster; it was capable of reaching velocities of 65 kilometers per hour (40 mph) with tracks, on road, and 90 kilometers per hour (56 mph) with wheels. However, given the non-ideal nature of Spanish terrain, the BT-5 was rarely capable of taking advantage of its speed. The loss of many of the Republic's BT-5s during the Battle of the Ebro caused them to retire the tank to their reserves. The BT-5 was a product improvement of J. Walter Christie's fast tank concept, using Christie suspension, and was armed with a 45-millimeter (1.8 in) tank gun.

=== Organization of Popular Front armored forces ===
The first 50 T-26 tanks which arrived in Spain, under the command of Krivoshein, were crewed by Soviet personnel. Nevertheless, the Soviet lieutenant colonel opened a training school in the town of Archena, near Cartagena, recruiting mainly truck and bus drivers from cities such as Madrid and Barcelona. The next month, he opened a second school in Alcalá de Henares, north of Madrid. However, only Communist soldiers were allowed to crew Soviet tanks, and as a result the pool of soldiers to recruit from was narrow and often less adept drivers were picked over better ones, due to their political ideologies. For example, in one instance a tank commander broke contact with the enemy because he had not learned how to fire his main gun. Furthermore, at first, the Soviet trainers did not have interpreters to communicate with their Spanish students.

With training underway, and the tanks quickly put into combat, the first 50 vehicles were organized into the Popular Army's first tank battalion. The battalion was equipped with three tank companies (each company containing ten tanks) and a headquarters company; each company had three platoons, with three tanks a piece, and a command tank. By mid-November a second battalion was organized. Later that month, Krivoshein and his deputy (Major Greisser) were recalled to the Soviet Union and replaced by General Dmitry Pavlov. In December 1936, General Pavlov organized new Soviet armored vehicles into an armored brigade, made up of four tank battalions and a reconnaissance company. This brigade, known as Brigada de Carros de Combate (Tank Brigade), was composed of 56 tanks and 68 other armored vehicles, and immediately saw combat around Madrid, including in the battles of Jarama and Guadalajara. However, the brigade was used to support Republican infantry forces and not as a mobile armored group, and as a result its strategic role during the war was limited by its misuse. In July 1937, the brigade took part in the Battle of Brunete, the largest tank battle to that date in the war, with some 150 Republican tanks taking part. The battle was also one of the few examples during the Spanish Civil War of the use of tanks to exploit a penetration along the front. However, the battle cost the Popular Army around 159 armored fighting vehicles.

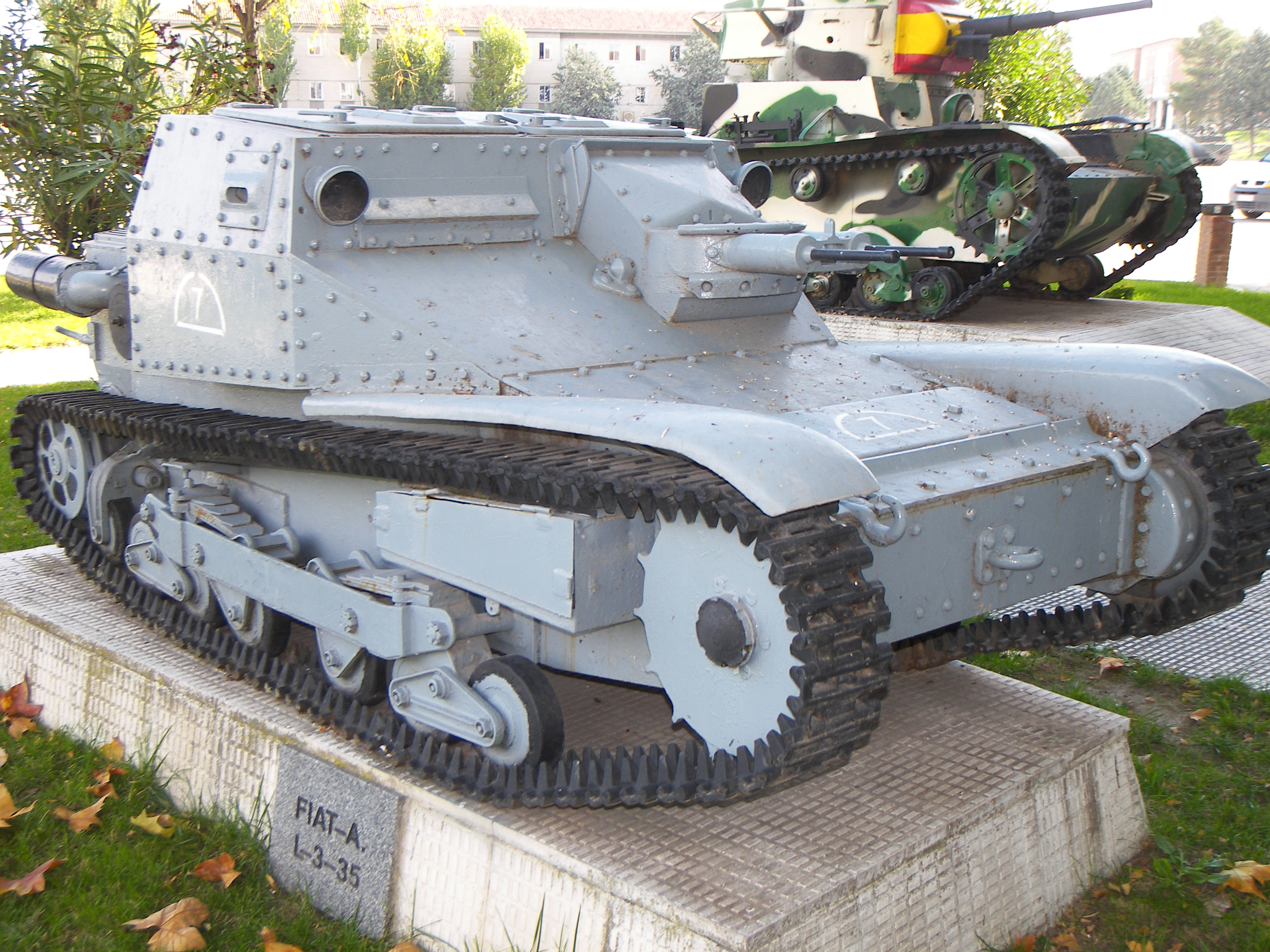
A CV-33 of the Spanish Army, at El Goloso

After the Battle of Brunete, the brigade was reorganized into a new Spanish division, known as the División de Ingenios Blindados (Armored Vehicles Division). This was composed of a tank brigade and an armored brigade; the latter was made up of lighter armored fighting vehicles, such as the BA-6. It was put under the command of Spanish Colonel Sánchez Paredes. By this time, most of the Soviet tankers had returned to the Soviet Union to provide information on mechanized warfare in Spain. The only Soviet unit left was the heavy tank regiment, armed with brand new BT-5s which had not been used in combat yet. This regiment was crewed by both Soviet and veteran Spanish tankers, and was put under the command of Soviet Colonel Kondriatev. Finally, the division also disposed of an infantry brigade and an anti-tank artillery company. However, by this time the Republican military command had relegated the tank to the role of merely infantry support, dissuaded by the poor performance of Republican armor to that date. The last major battle Republican armor would take part in was the Battle of the Ebro, in 1938.

The Soviets deduced that although tank formations in Spain were not large enough to perform an ideal mechanized penetration of an enemy's lines, too large tank formations were also not ideal due to uneven terrain preventing their use en masse. As a result, armored commanders like Pavlov considered the tank's best role to be infantry support. The Republican use of armor during the Spanish Civil War was not a good demonstration of deep mechanized battle.

=== Armor of the Nationalists (Spanish Rebel Army) ===
CV-33/35 shipments during the Spanish Civil War
Date	Number of vehicles
26 August 1936	5
7 October 1936	10
8 December 1936	20
January & February 1937	24
March 1937	24
April 1937	12
September 1937	16
April 1938	12
November & December 1938	32
Total	155

During the Spanish Civil War, the Nationalist Army only developed a single tank, the Carro de Combate de Infantería tipo 1937 (Infantry Tank model 1937). Taking advantage of the capture of the Trubia Factory in the north, in 1937, the Nationalists-based it on the Republican Trubia-Naval, the German Panzer I, the T-26 and the Italian CV-33. It was designed to unite the best of all three major light tanks used by the Nationalist Army during the war. However, it did not perform as well as expected, and it was not put into mass production. The Nationalist Army did manufacture a small number of armored trucks and tractors, as well as beginning the development of the Verdeja light tank, but none of these contributed with distinction to the Nationalist effort against the Popular Army.

The first foreign tanks to enter service with the Nationalists were five Italian CV-33s, which arrived at the city of Vigo on 26 August 1936. These arrived with ten crewman, who would serve as instructors. The tanks were armed with two 8-millimeter (0.31 in) machine guns and had a maximum of 15 millimeters (0.59 in) of steel armor. On 10 December 1936, Italian dictator Benito Mussolini decided to send combat troops to Spain, in a bid to end the war as early as possible. These men were organized into the Corpo Truppe Volontarie (CTV; Volunteer Corps), and by the end of the year their ranks had swelled to an estimated 47,000 men; 20,000 of which came from the Italian Army, and 27,000 of which originated from the Blackshirts. The corps was put under the command of Italian General Mario Roatta. The first major battle for the CTV came in March 1938, when it decided to engage Republican forces during the Battle of Guadalajara. A force of some 35,000 men, including 81 tanks, attacked on 8 March 1937. Failing to take into account the meteorological conditions of the battlefield, by the following day the Italian troops found themselves attacking over ground that had turned into mud due to the heavy rains. The slow speed of the advance allowed the Republican Air Force to persistently raid advancing Italian forces, dispersing entire columns off the main roads and forcing them to stall in the mud. A Republican counterattack on 18 March, led by Pavlov's armored brigade, forced the Italians to withdraw. Nationalist air support failed to provide close air support for Italian troops because runways had become water-logged, while Italian armor proved no match against the heavier and faster T-26 and BT-5 tanks. Officially, the Italians lost an estimated 2,700 soldiers during the campaigning around Guadalajara; the Republican Army lost an estimated 4,000. According to other sources, the CTV lost an estimated 5,000 casualties during the battle. However, armor losses were relatively low, as the Republicans lost 7 T-26s and the Italians lost 19 CV-33s. Despite this initial setback, the Italian government continued the supply of personnel and equipment to the CTV in Spain, and by late 1938 the Italian volunteer's corps was equipped with three tank battalions. By the end of the war, a total of 155 CV-33s were delivered to Spain.

Panzer I deliveries to Spain (1936–1939)
Date	Number of vehicles
October 1936	41
December 1936	21
August 1937	30
End of 1937	10
January 1939	30
Total:	122

The Germans delivered a total of 122 Panzer I light tanks to the Spanish Army over the course of the war. The first shipment arrived in October 1936, consisting of 41 tanks. These tanks would see combat as early as 30 October, around Madrid, when they engaged a column of Republican armored cars, which were able to knock out the German tanks at ranges of 500 meters (550 yd), with their larger guns. Although the use of armor penetrating ammunition fired from the Panzer I's 7.92-millimeter (0.312 in) machine guns could penetrate the armor of the T-26 at ranges of up to 150 meters (160 yd), Republican tankers simply began to engage from ranges of up to 1,000 meters (1,100 yd), using their heavier 45-millimeter (1.8 in) tank guns. Furthermore, the sights on the T-26 were calibrated for ranges far longer than those calibrated on German equipment. This disadvantage in firepower led the Nationalist Army to experiment with the adoption of the Italian 20-millimeter (0.79 in) Breda anti-aircraft gun for its fleet of Panzer Is. Firing a 140-gram (4.9 oz) perforating projectile, this cannon could penetrate up to 40 millimeters (1.6 in) of steel armor at a range of 250 meters (270 yd). The installation of the gun required the top of the tank's turret to be cut off and extended upwards, increasing the vehicle's profile and decreasing the visibility of the crew. Furthermore, the new gun's sights were located within an open crease to the front of the new turret extension, forcing the gunner to aim and fire from a relatively unsafe position. Although originally the Nationalists were aiming to equip at least one Panzer I in each platoon of each battalion with the larger gun, only four prototypes were completed. The capture of Republican T-26s and their return to service with the Nationalist Army made the modification of the Panzer I unnecessary, while later attempts to up-gun the German light tank failed because of the lack of available 20-millimeter (0.79 in) Breda guns. There were also attempts to mount a 37-millimeter (1.5 in) anti-tank gun and a 45-millimeter (1.8 in) tank gun, taken from a captured Soviet vehicle, but these failed before any prototypes were completed.

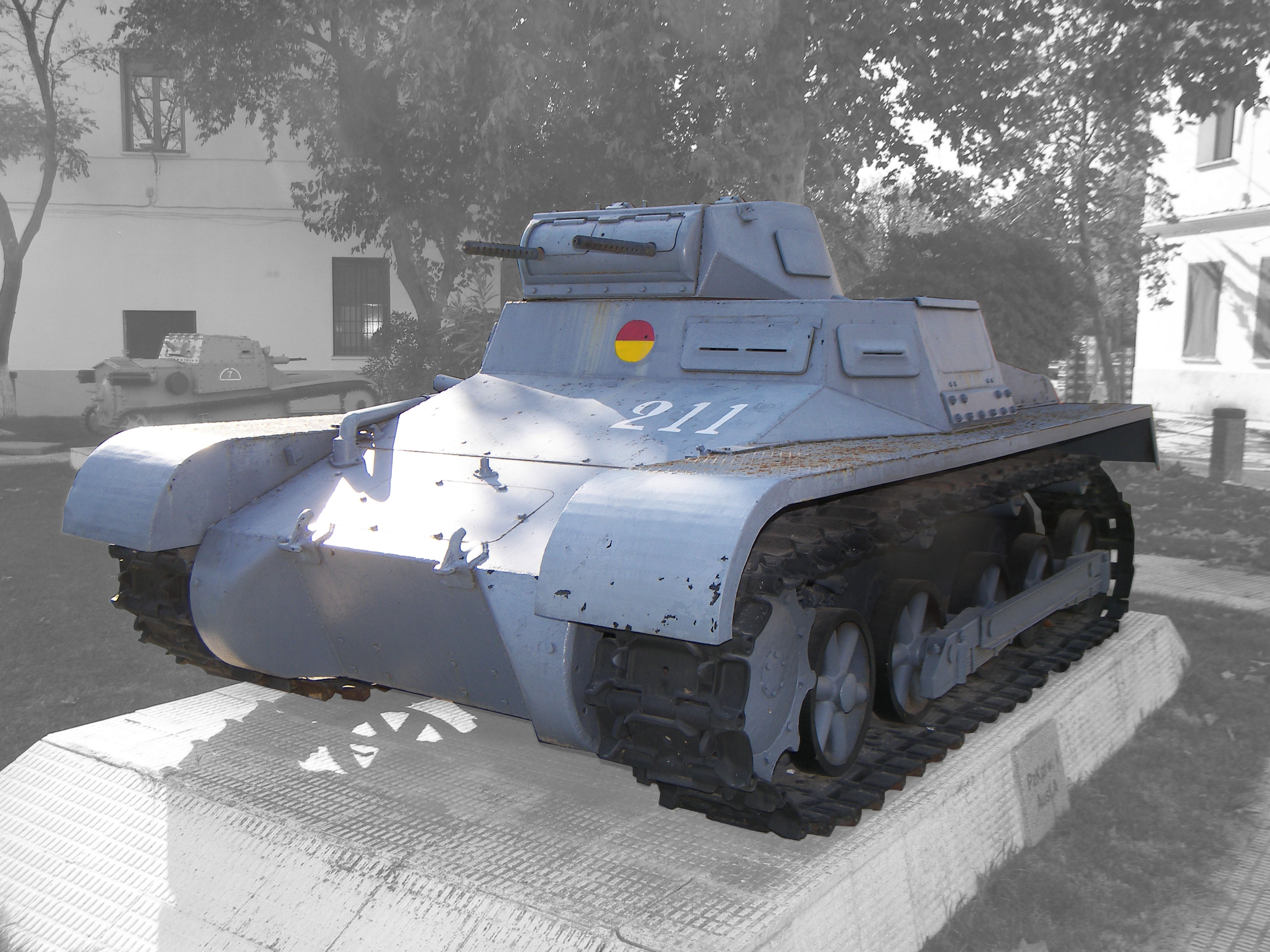
The Panzer I heavily influenced the Verdeja's turret design

The Nationalist's tank disparity with Republican forces caused Nationalist commanders to offer Spanish soldiers up to 500 pesetas for each captured T-26. Due to the number of T-26s captured and put back into service against their previous masters, the Soviet Union also inadvertently became the largest provider of armored fighting vehicles of the Nationalist Army. An estimated total of 178 T-26s were captured during the Spanish Civil War, including 98 put back into service, 30 irreparable vehicles used for spare parts, and 50 T-26s not pressed into service with the Nationalist Army. In May 1939, France turned over 10 T-26s, which had been interned after they had retreated across the border, to Nationalist Spain. The number of captured BT-5s amounted to much less. By May 1938, the Nationalist tank force had only put into service 4 BT-5s, as opposed to 39 T-26s. The first Nationalist tank company outfitted with T-26s entered combat during the Battle of Brunete, between 18–23 July 1937. Ultimately, the amount of captured equipment caused the Nationalists to organize a recuperation unit, designed to recuperate Soviet armor off the field and repair them so that they could return to combat.

== Post-war era: 1939–1953 ==
At the end of the Spanish Civil War, the Spanish Army could count on 144 Panzer Is and CV-33s, and 139 T-26s. Panzer Is and CV-33s were organized as "light tanks", denominated Type Is, while the T-26s were considered "medium" tanks and categorized as Type IIs. These were organized into four armored regiments, including the 1st Tank Regiment (based in Madrid), the 2nd Tank Regiment (in Sevilla) and the 3rd and 4th Tank Regiments. The 3rd's organization was based upon that used by Nationalist forces during the Spanish Civil War, while the 4th's was based on that used by the Italian CTV. In 1941, a fifth regiment was created in North Africa.

=== Verdeja tank program ===
Between late 1937 and 1938, Captain Félix Verdeja Bardales began to privately develop the concept for a new light tank. The new tank would take into consideration all the qualities and problems with existing tanks in service with the Nationalist Army, including the Panzer I and T-26, and combine a number of characteristics which would make it the best light tank in service at the time. His ideal light tank included a 45-millimeter (1.8 in) tank gun, with 360-degree traverse and an elevation of 72 degrees. At the same time, the vehicle was to have the lowest possible silhouette, and no less than 15 millimeters (0.59 in) of all-around armor, and 30 millimeters (1.2 in) on the front. Furthermore, the armor was to be sloped to maximize its efficiency and chance of an incoming projectile ricocheting. With a maximum velocity of 70 kilometers per hour (43 mph), the light tank was to be powered by a 120 horsepower (89 kW) engine. Furthermore, the vehicle's mechanical reliability was to improve upon that of the existing tanks in service with the Nationalist Army. Despite initial obstacles, including opposition to an indigenous Spanish tank program from German General Wilhelm Ritter von Thoma, the first prototype was delivered in late 1938; this prototype was built from spare parts taken from a number of different tanks. The prototype performed well in testing and a new prototype was ordered.

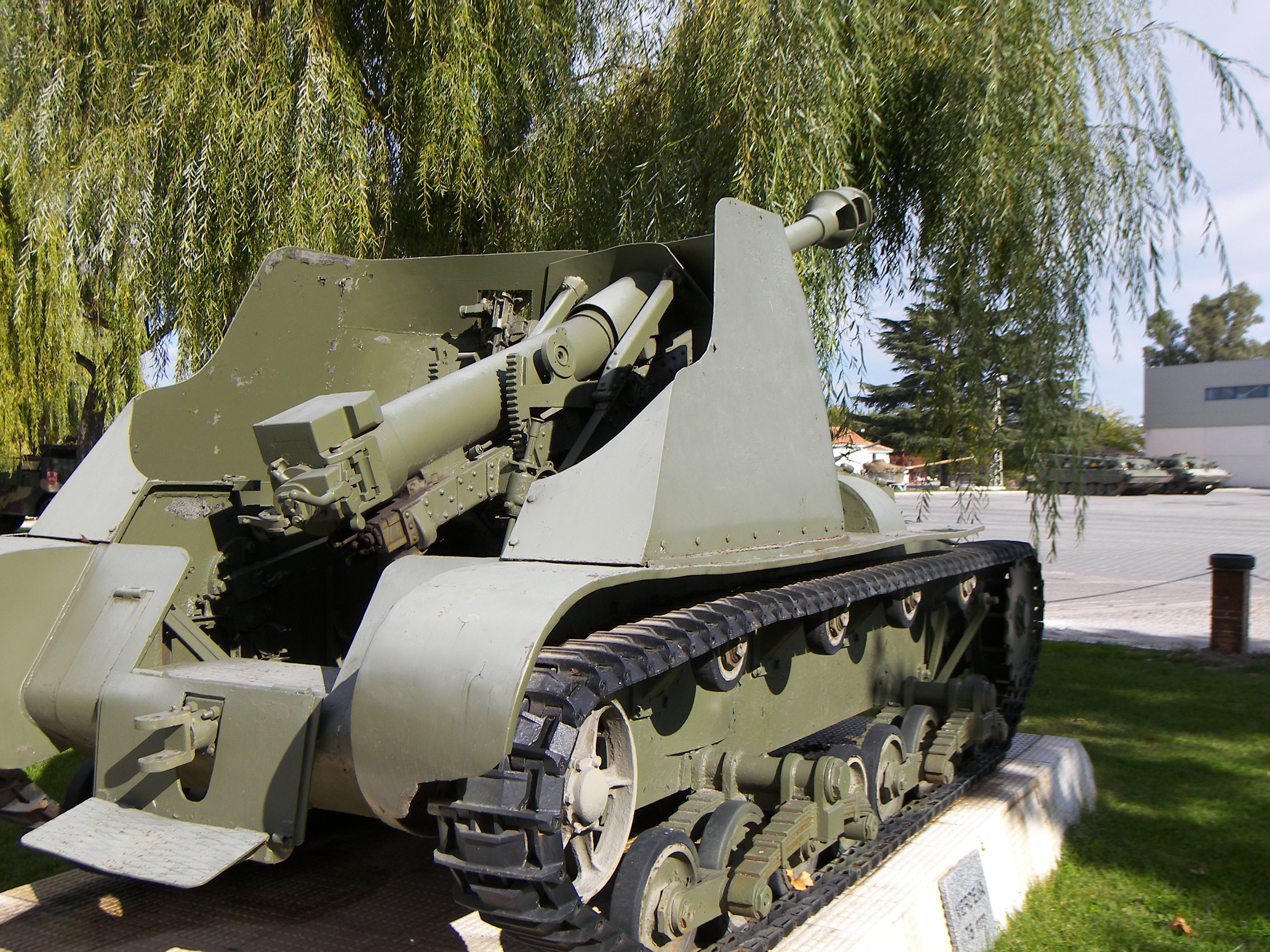
The Verdeja 75 mm Self-Propelled Howitzer, with the gun system visible

The new prototype was much closer to what Captain Verdeja had originally planned. The chassis was enlarged, and the engine was moved to the left side of the front compartment of the hull. The volume of the fuel tanks and the thickness of the armor was also increased, while the height of the turret was decreased by sloping the turret's sides. One of the most unusual—at the time—developments for the tank were the tracks, designed to eliminate the possibility of having them slide off when the tank was moving. The tank had a sprocket to the front of the hull, on each side, and a tensioner to the rear. The tracks were guided by four return rollers and four roadwheels. The tracks had previously been tested on the original prototype; they were designed to fit around the roadwheel, and consequently lock themselves into place, avoiding the possibility of slipping off. The construction of the prototype was postponed until May 1940, due to a shortage of funds, and the tank was finally delivered to the proving grounds of Carabanchel for testing. The prototype was denominated the Verdeja 1, and competed against a T-26B in a number of different tests. Ultimately, the Verdeja scored a total of 243 points, as compared to 205 scored by the T-26. The testing resulted in a number of modifications, including higher suspension to allow climbing over taller obstacles, the increase in armor thickness, increase of the body width and the creation of an empty space at the rear, to allow for the future installation of a communications radio. After two months work, the Verdeja 1 was returned for testing and this time scored a total of 261.98 points. Although the success of this prototype persuaded the Spanish government to issue an order for the construction of 1,000 tanks, ultimately lack of incentives to develop the relevant industrial infrastructure; the poor economic situation after the Spanish Civil War and absence of foreign clients, soon caused the production program to collapse.

As the Verdeja 1 program dissolved, Captain Verdeja began to design a successor, taking into consideration the lessons learned during the opening campaigns of the Second World War. The new design featured a reorganized engine bay at the rear of the chassis, which meant moving the drive sprocket to the rear as well. The movement of the engine's location allowed for better cooling of the vehicle's motor and the fighting compartment, as well as allowing the turret to be moved forward. The vehicle's armor was also increased substantially. This new tank was not approved for production or further development, due to continued postponement of the production of the Verdeja 1 for reasons which included offers by the German government to supply the Panzer IV's engine for the Verdeja 1. Although production of the new vehicle finally began in 1942, it was not until August 1944 that the Verdeja 2 prototype was delivered. The decision to purchase a number of German armored vehicles delayed the decision to begin production of the Verdeja 2; ultimately the vehicle was left untouched until 1950, when there was a failed attempt to mount a new engine.

The Verdeja series compared to the T-26 and Panzer I
	Verdeja 1	Verdeja 2	Verdeja 75 mm	T-26B	Panzer I Ausf. B
Weight	6.5 t (7.16 tons)	10.9 t (12.01 tons)	6.5 t (7.16 tons)	9.4 t (10.36 tons)	5.4 t (5.95 tons)
Gun	45 mm cannon (1.77 inches)	45 mm cannon	75 mm howitzer (2.95 in)	45 mm cannon	7.92 mm machine gun (0.312 in)
Ammunition	72 rounds	146 rounds	32 rounds	122 rounds	2,250 rounds
Road range	220 km (140 mi)	220 km (140 mi)	220 km (140 mi)	175 km (109 mi)	200 km (120 mi)
Maximum speed	44 km/h (27 mph)	46 km/h (29 mph)	44 km/h (27 mph)	31.1 km/h (19 mph)	50 km/h (31 mph)
Armor	7–25 mm (0.28–0.98 in)	10–40 mm (0.39–1.57 in)	7–25 mm (0.28–0.98 in)	7–16 mm (0.28–0.63 in)	7–13 mm (0.28–0.51 in)

Beginning in 1945, the now-Major Verdeja was ordered to begin designing an artillery piece using a rapid-firing 75 millimeter L/40 howitzer designed by Sociedad Española de Construcción Naval, based on the Verdeja 1 chassis. The chassis' roof and rear wall were eliminated, and instead a gun shield placed over the front. A mechanical brake was installed next to the idler wheel, stopping rearwards movement of the artillery piece during the firing process. The availability of the required parts and the lack of complicated changes meant that the vehicle was quickly prepared and tested extensively. The fate of the self-propelled piece was much the same as that of the Verdeja 2, and the vehicle was left untouched at the proving grounds in Carabanchel until 1973, when it was moved to the Spanish base Alfonso XIII, housing the then Mechanized Infantry Regiment Wad Rass nº 55. It was soon moved to another base, and finally delivered to the base of El Goloso, outside of Madrid, as a part of an armored vehicles museum.

=== German armor in service with the Spanish Army ===
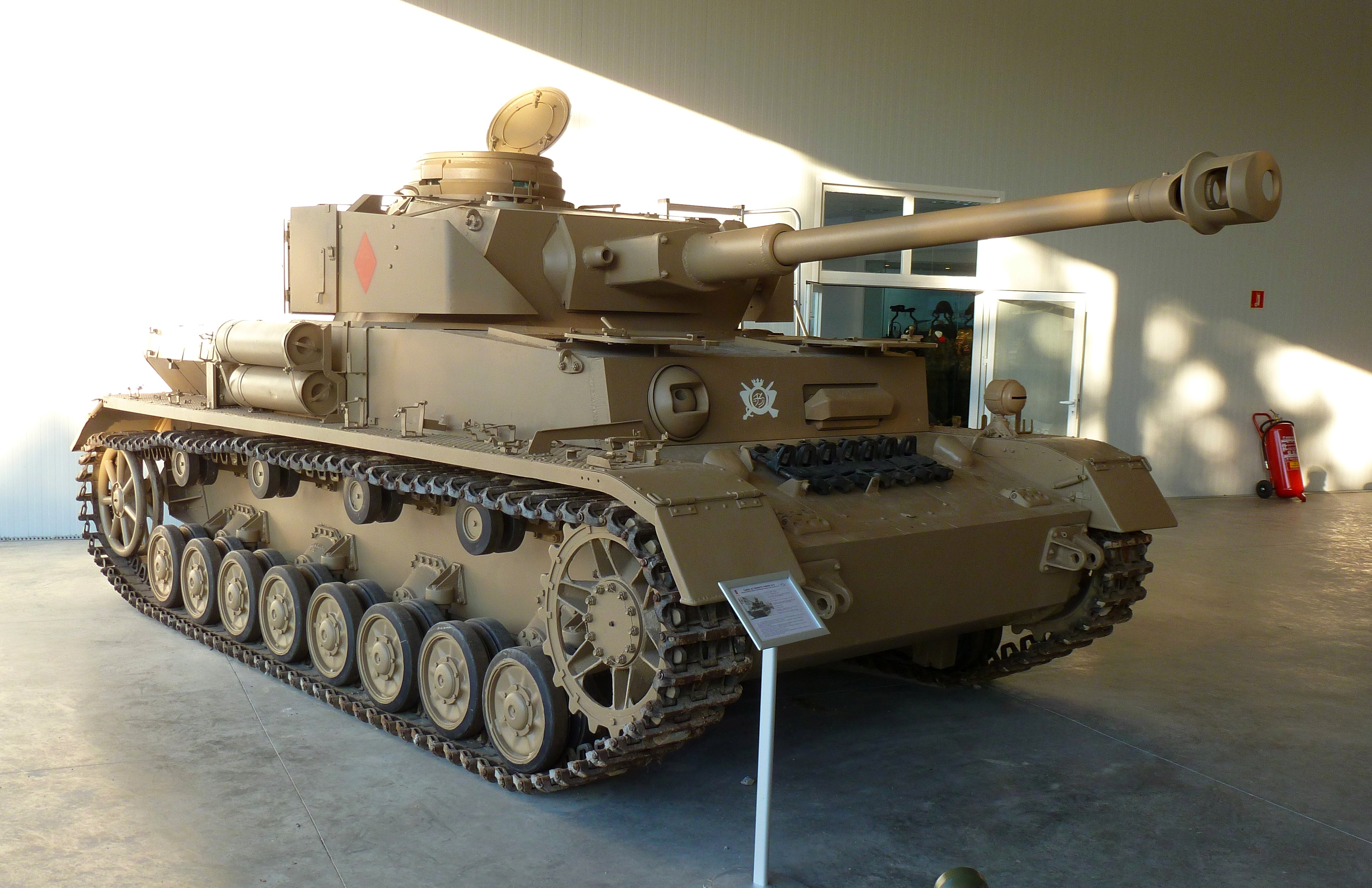
Panzer IV Ausf. H, El Goloso Museum of Armored Vehicles, Madrid, Spain

In 1943, the Spanish Army and government decided to replace much of its armor, after studying war in Europe and North Africa. Tanks such as the Panzer I and T-26 were obsolete, as compared to newer tanks such as the Soviet T-34 and German Panther tank. As a result, on 15 March 1943 Spain began to negotiate with the Wehrmacht over the acquisition of modern materiel. The petition asked for 250 Panzer IIIs and 100 Panzer IVs. In return, the Germans instead offered a sale of 20 Panzer IVs and 10 Sturmgeschütz IIIs. On 29 April, Spain accepted Germany's offer. The Panzer IVs sold were of the Ausf. H variant, and arrived in Spain on 6 December 1943. The Panzer IV Ausf. H included the longer 75-millimeter (3.0 in) tank gun, and the homogeneous 80-millimeter (3.1 in) steel plate on the glacis.

As early as January 1944, Spain again began to negotiate with Germany for more equipment. The new program revolved around the sale of 33 Panzer IVs, three of which would be of the command variant. Another offer was made for 67 more Panzer IVs at a later date; a result, the two programs together summed up to a potential procurement of 100 Panzer IVs. Spain also suggested the purchase of a number of Tiger tanks, although this offer never amounted to anything serious. Regardless, the program to acquire another 100 Panzer IVs never materialized. The 20 Panzer IVs received in late 1943 were organized into two companies, distributed among two battalions in the armored regiment of the Armoured Division No. 1 "Brunete".

At the end of World War II, the Spanish Army counted on a tank force composed of 20 Panzer IVs, 10 StuG IIIs, 116 T-26s, 93 Panzer Is (including command vehicles), 60 CV-33s and 80 armored cars. In 1949 the armored regiment was reorganized into two battalions of 60 T-26s, with two command Panzer Is, six combat versions of the Panzer I and two CV-33, which were used for reconnaissance, each. A third battalion was composed of the 20 Panzer IVs, plus six Panzer Is. The regiment numbered an estimated 1,500 personnel and 100 tanks.

== American military aid: 1954–1970 ==
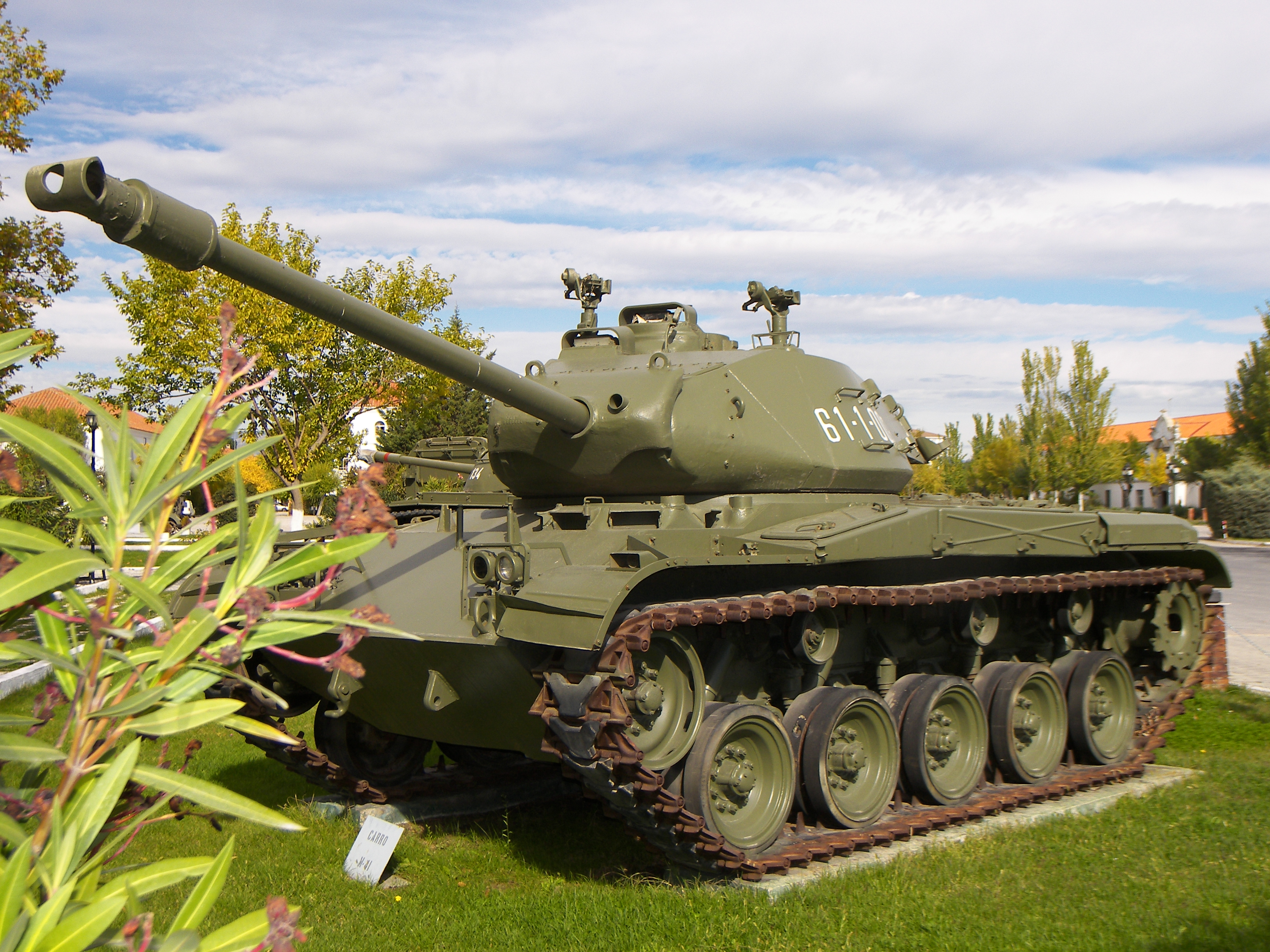
An M41 Walker Bulldog of the Spanish Army, on display at El Goloso.

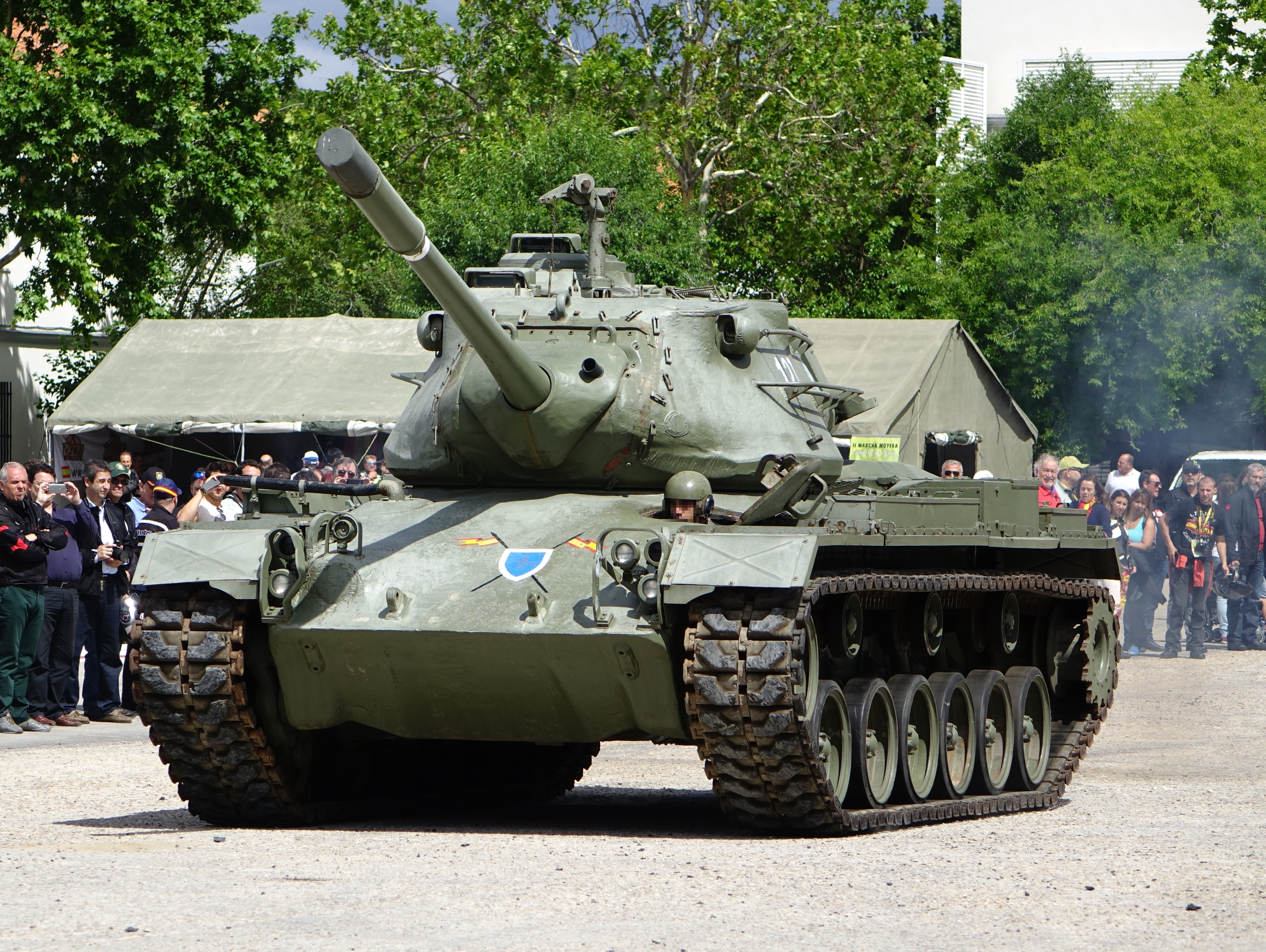
A Spanish M47 Patton. Despite being completely obsolete, serving practically nothing more than for instruction, the M-47s were for decades the most numerous tanks in the Spanish arsenal.

By the mid-1950s, the state of the Spanish Army's tanks was deteriorating. Spain's armored force composition remained the same until February 1954, when the United States delivered the first twelve M47 Patton tanks to the Spanish Army. These were a product of a military aid program the United States had signed with Spain in 1953. By 1957, the Spanish Army had received a total of 29 M47 tanks. Over the course of the 1950s, Spain received a total of 389 M47 Patton tanks. Throughout the 1960s, Spain received 65 M48 Patton tanks and 66 M48A1s. The M47 and M48 tanks were an important modernization of Spain's armored firepower. For example, while the T-26 was armed with a 45-millimeter (1.8 in) cannon, the American tanks were armed with the much more powerful 90-millimeter (3.5 in) tank gun.

While a Panzer IV's (Ausf. G) 75-millimeter (3 in) L/43 tank gun could penetrate 77 millimeters (3 in) of steel armor at 1,800 meters (2,000 yd) (using the Panzergranate 39), the M47 (using the M348 high-explosive anti-tank (HEAT) warhead) could penetrate 190 millimeters (7.5 in) from its 90-millimeter (3.5 in) tank gun. Further, the M47's armor was 110 millimeters (4.3 in) thick on the glacis plate, and 178 millimeters (7 in) thick on the turret front. Spain also received a number of M41 Walker Bulldog light tanks. These were organized into the Villaviciosa Light Armored Cavalry Regiment, while four were also organized into the Alcázar de Toledo Armored Infantry Regiment as reconnaissance tanks.

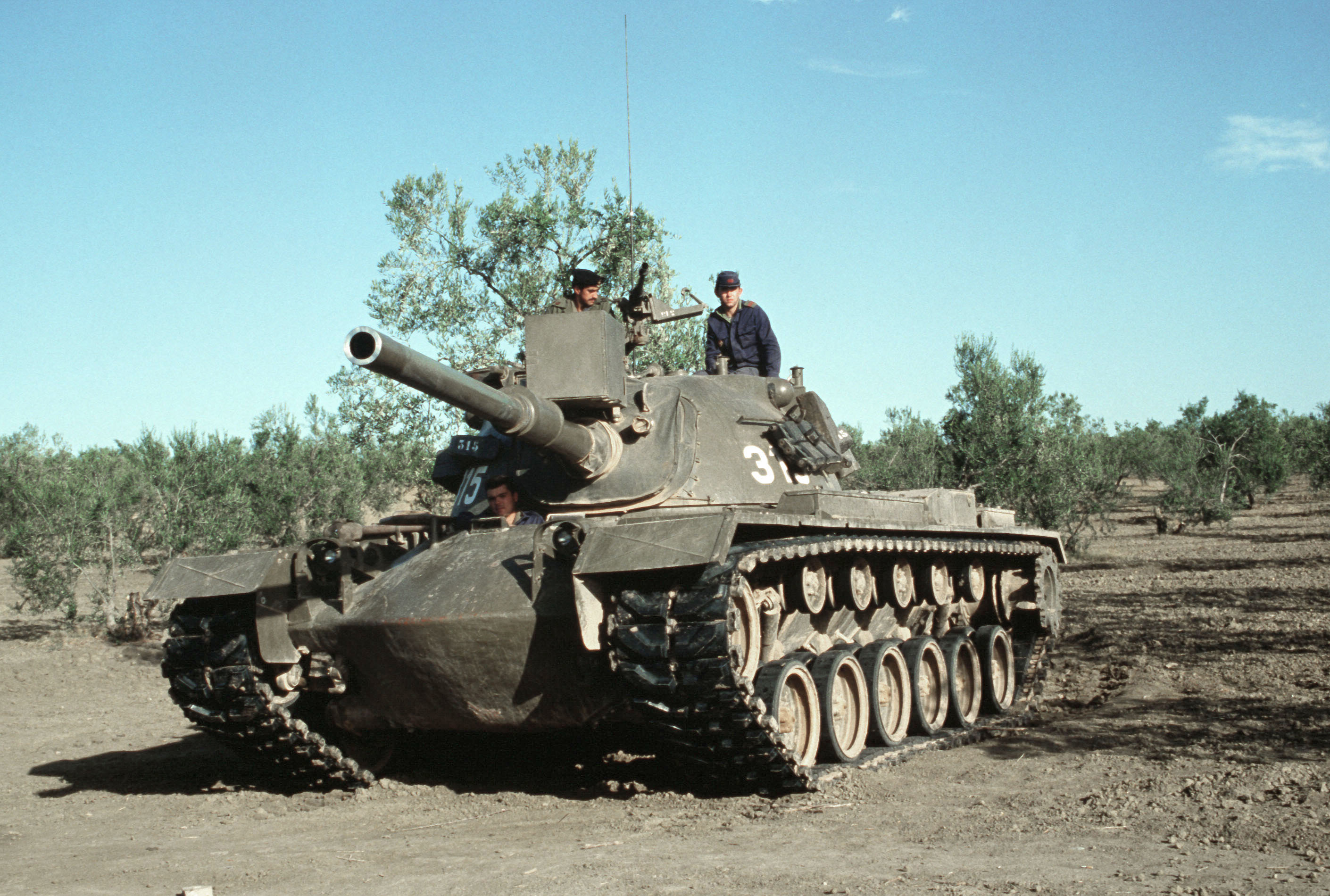
One M48 Patton medium tank participate in the joint US Spanish military Exercise CRISEX '83.

Between 1953 and 1968, the Spanish Army received a total of 446 medium battle tanks (M47s and M48s), 123 light tanks (M24s and M41s), as well as 30 armored recovery vehicles (the M74). In 1970, the United States agreed to extend the military aid program by another five years, giving Spain another 66 M48A2 tanks and 17 M41A3s.

The vehicles received were organized based on a reorganization of the Brunete Armored Division in 1965. This included the General Staff, based at El Pardo, and the Nucleo de Tropas Divisionario (Divisionary Troop Nucleus). The latter was formed by the Villaviciosa Light Armored Cavalry Regiment, the Campaign Artillery Regiment, the 1st Anti-Air Artillery Group, the 1st Engineering Regiment and the Divisionary Logistics Group. Also in the division was the XI Mechanized Infantry Brigade, which included the 6th Saboya Motorized Infantry Regiment, the 55th Uad Ras Mechanized Infantry Regiment, the XI Self-Propelled Artillery Group, the XI Engineering Battalion and the XI Logistics Group. Finally, the division also made use of the XII Armored Brigade, which was formed by the 61st Alcázar de Toledo Armored Infantry Regiment, the 31st Asturias Mechanized Infantry Regiment, the XII Self-Propelled Artillery Group, the XII Engineering Battalion and the XII Logistics Group. The majority of the division's armor was located in the Alcázar de Toledo Armored Infantry Regiment, which contained two regiments of 48 M48s and 54 M47s, respectively.

== Late Cold War: 1970–1991 ==
=== Western Sahara crisis and Purchase of French tanks ===
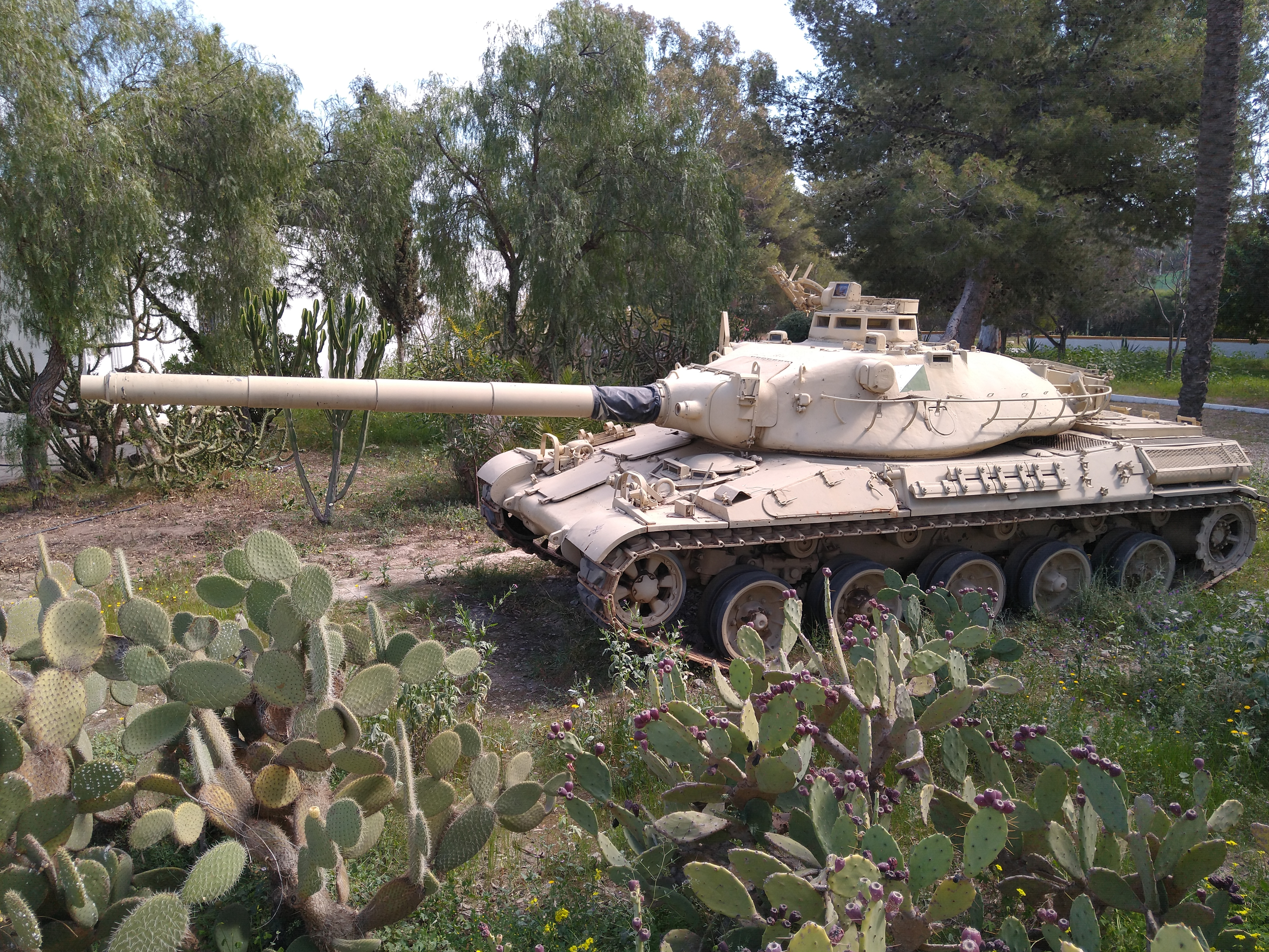
An AMX-30E in the Museographic Collection of the Spanish Legion in Almería

The United States' ban on the usage of American ordnance supplied as military aid to Spain during the 1957–58 Ifni War pushed Spain to look for alternative equipment which could be freely employed in the Spanish Sahara. Throughout the 1960s, the Spanish government had approached the governments of France and West Germany, hoping to procure either the AMX-30 or the Leopard 1, respectively. Ultimately, the Germans were unable to sell the Leopard tank on account of the gun system being British; at the time, the British Labour Party had decided not to sell to the government of Francisco Franco in Spain. As a result, in May 1970 Spain and France agreed to the sale of 19 AMX-30 main battle tanks. The first six AMX-30s were delivered in November 1970, and these were immediately issued to a new armoured company of the Spanish Legion, stationed in Spanish Sahara. All 19 AMX-30s purchased from France in 1970 were delivered to the Spanish Legion, in the Spanish Sahara. Beginning in 1974, Spain began to manufacture the AMX-30 (now denominated the AMX-30E), with production of the first batch of 180 tanks ending on 25 June 1979. The second batch, this time of 100 AMX-30Es, were produced between 1979 and 1983. This gave the Spanish Army a total of 299 AMX-30Es.

The AMX-30E was armed with the 105-millimeter (4.1 in) modele F1 tank gun, and was powered by the HS-110 680 horsepower (510 kW) diesel engine. With a fuel tank of 970 liters (210 imp gal), the tank had a road range of 600 kilometers (370 mi) and the fuel was, on average, sufficient for 18 hours of travel. The tracks had a life of at least 5,000 kilometers (3,100 mi). However, Spain's new tanks began to suffer a number of mechanical problems, dealing with the reliability of the original engine and transmission. Therefore, the Spanish Army and Santa Bárbara Sistemas (the vehicle's manufacturer in Spain) began to look into a series of modifications to improve the AMX-30. By this time, the Spanish Army had already begun upgrading its M47 and M48 Patton tanks to the M47E and M48E models, which made them equivalent to the M60 Patton tank in capabilities.

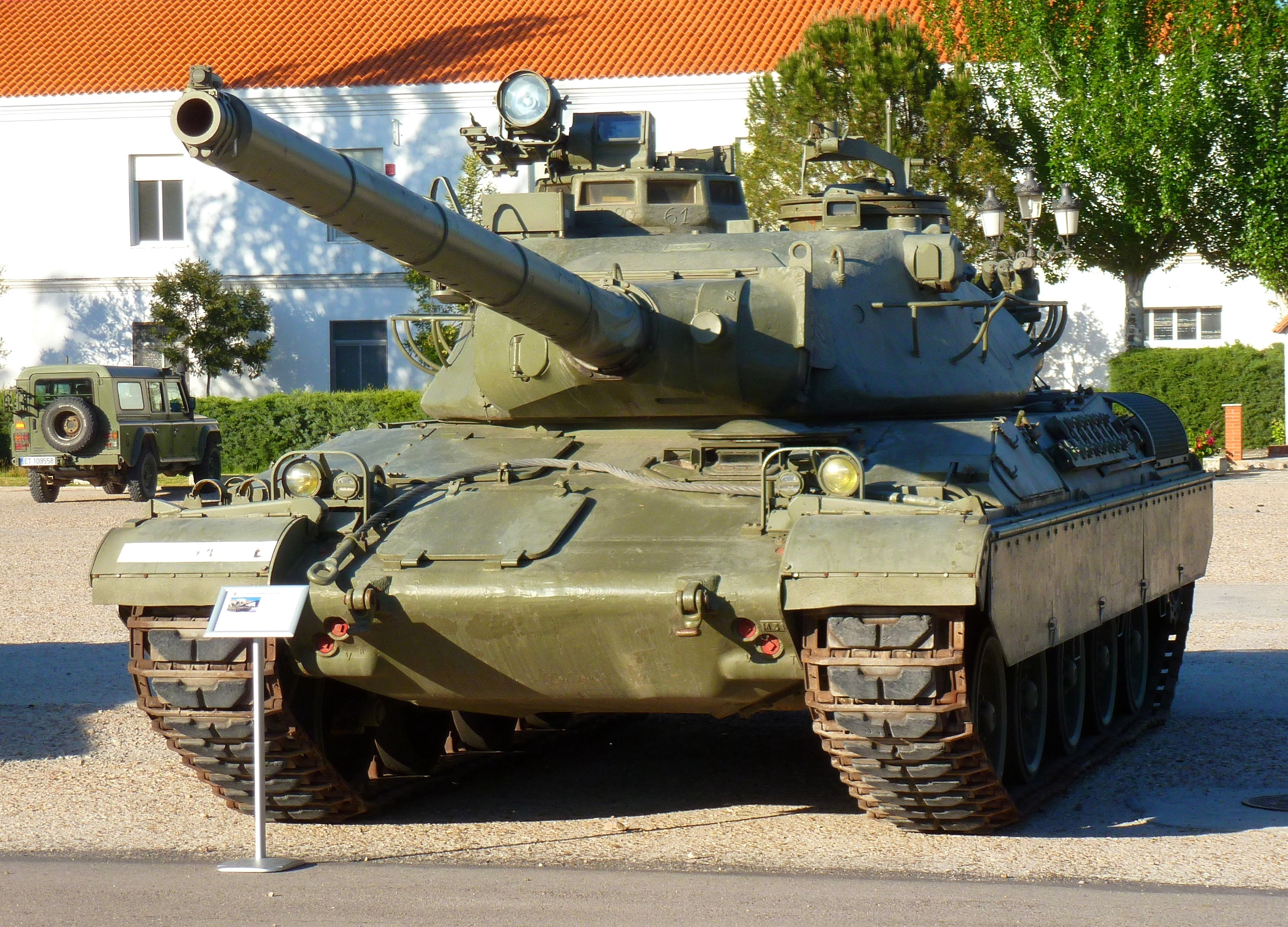
An AMX-30EM2 on display at the Museum of Armoured Vehicles of El Goloso

From the late 1970s Spain had upgraded 330 M47 tanks to the M47E and E1 standard with AVDS-1790-2A diesel engines and CD-850-6A transmissions like those in the M60A1 and elimination of the bow gunners position. Another 46 were further upgraded to the M47E2 standard with a German Rheinmetall Rh-105-30 105 mm gun. Eighteen of the Spanish M48's were locally upgraded to the M48A5E standard, essentially matching the American M48A3 configuration for the Marines. Fifty four M48A2 tanks (1 battalion) acquired from Germany were locally upgraded to the M48A5E1 standard which was equivalent to the American M48A5, followed by and 108 from the United States upgraded to the M48A5E1 which provided a passive M35 periscope for the gunner, AM/VVS-2 passive periscope for the driver and the TEESS engine smoke laying system. From 1983 a further 54 tanks were upgraded to the M48A5E2 standard with a Hughes Mk 7 fire control system similar to that of the M60A3 featuring a passive night vision sight for the gunner, laser rangefinder, and analog electronic ballistic computer. A further 110 were upgraded in 1984. A further upgrade of these to the M48A5E3 standard from 1991 featuring a gun stabilization system and thermal gunners sight was cancelled with the availability of surplus American M60A3 TTS tanks retired under CFE.

=== Lince Programme (Lynx) ===
While the army was studying a possible modernisation of its brand-new AMX-30E fleet, the Spanish Ministry of Defense had set aside 120 billion pesetas (1.1 billion dollars) for a future tank programme and attracted interest from five foreign companies. A bid by Krauss-Maffei's, known as the Lince, provided the clearest technical designs. The tank would be 49 metric tons (54 short tons) and equipped with a 120-millimeter main gun. It could fire this gun on the move and aim at targets with effectiveness in day and night operations. Fitted with a 1,200 horsepower (894.84 kW) engine, the Lince could travel as fast as 70 kilometers per hour (43.50 mph) on the roads. Although heavily based on the Leopard 2A4, the Lince was smaller and lighter, trading protection for mobility. Specifically, the Lince prioritised enhanced mobility over the irregular Spanish terrain. Furthermore, size restrictions were imposed due to the existing capabilities of Spain's railroad and highway network. Although the reduced armor conflicted with the problems that the Spanish had with AMX-30E's thin armour, the Lince used a multi-layer armor similar to that of the German Leopard 2A4, providing greater protection than standard armour for a similar weight. The protection was further enhanced by the low profile turret, again similar to that of the Leopard 2A4. Despite the offer and ongoing collaboration with the Italians, Spanish investment in the German-Spanish Lince programme grew up to 200 billion pesetas (1.8 billion dollars). However, the Spanish government did not announce any winner for the contract. This indecision led Krauss-Maffei to freeze their bid for the Lince. Krauss-Maffei also cited the loss of millions of dollars due to failures on part of Santa Bárbara Sistemas, who would manufacture the Lince. In 1987, the Lince program was pushed aside and postponed by the Spanish Ministry of Defense's decision to instead go on with the modernisation of the Spanish Army's AMX-30E fleet. Ultimately, the purchase of a number of M60 Patton tanks, the modernisation of the AMX-30E and the continued fiscal problems finally caused the Spanish Ministry of Defense to cancel the Lince programme in 1989.

=== 1990s modernization ===
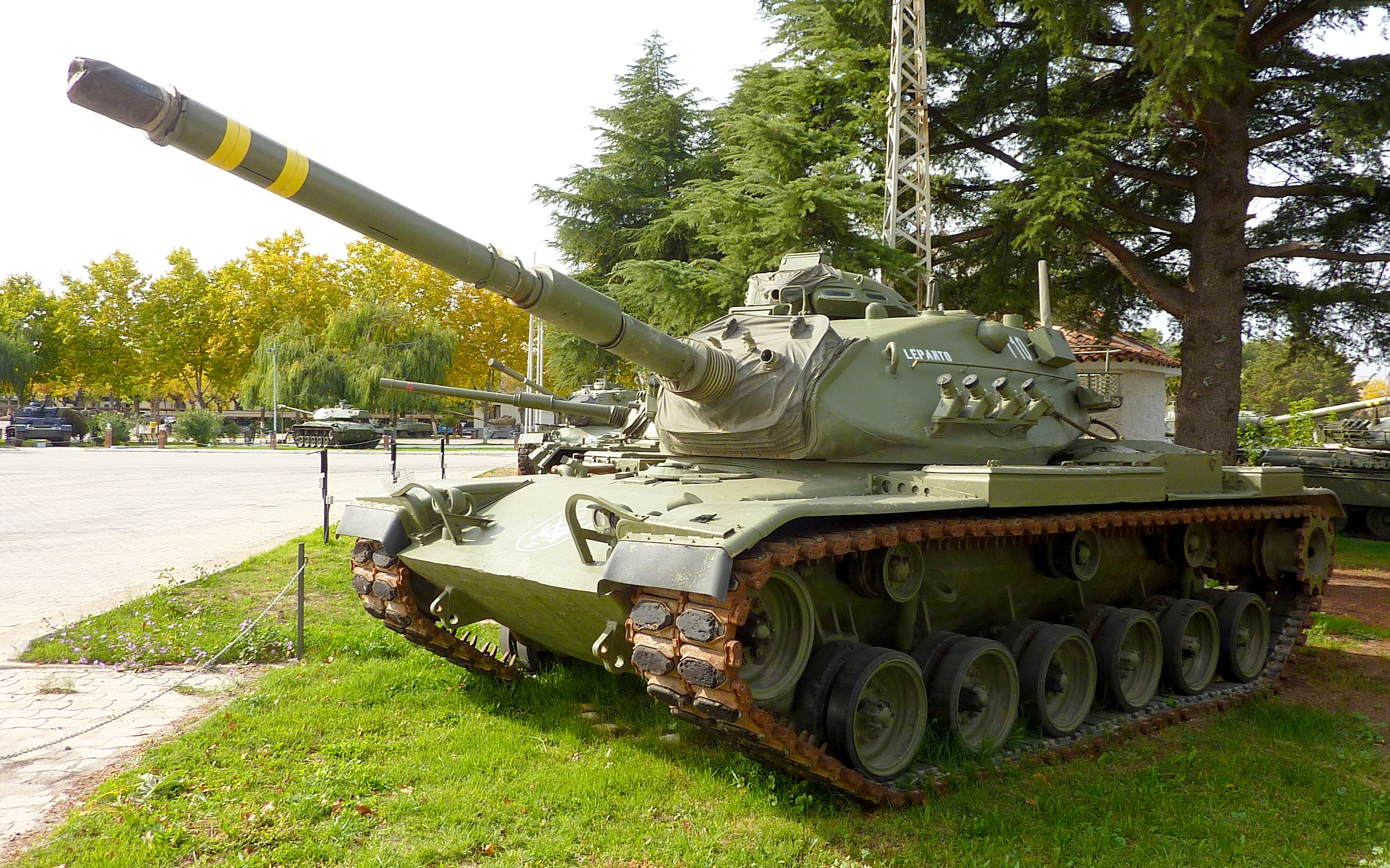
A Spanish M60A3

Between 1989 and 1993, 150 AMX-30Es were modernised to what would become known as the AMX-30EM2. The modernisation entailed the introduction of a new armour piercing discarding sabot round, the modification of the turret hatch to allow the installation of a larger anti-aircraft machine gun, and a brand new fire control system. Besides these modernisations of the tank's firepower, the mobility of the tank was improved through the exchange of the old engine and transmission for the more reliable MTU 833 Ka-501 diesel engine, producing 850 horsepower (630 kW), coupled with the German ZF LSG-3000. A new smoke machine, linked to the tank's new engine, was also installed. The other 149 AMX-30Es went through a less expensive and extensive modification, known as the AMX-30EM1. These received the American Allison CD-850-6A three speed transmission (two forward and one reverse); however, the new transmission caused extensive overheating in the engine compartment. These 149 AMX-30EM1s would eventually be replaced by US surplus M60A3 Patton tanks, purchased from the United States, in the early 1990s.

== Modern Spanish armor: 1992–present ==
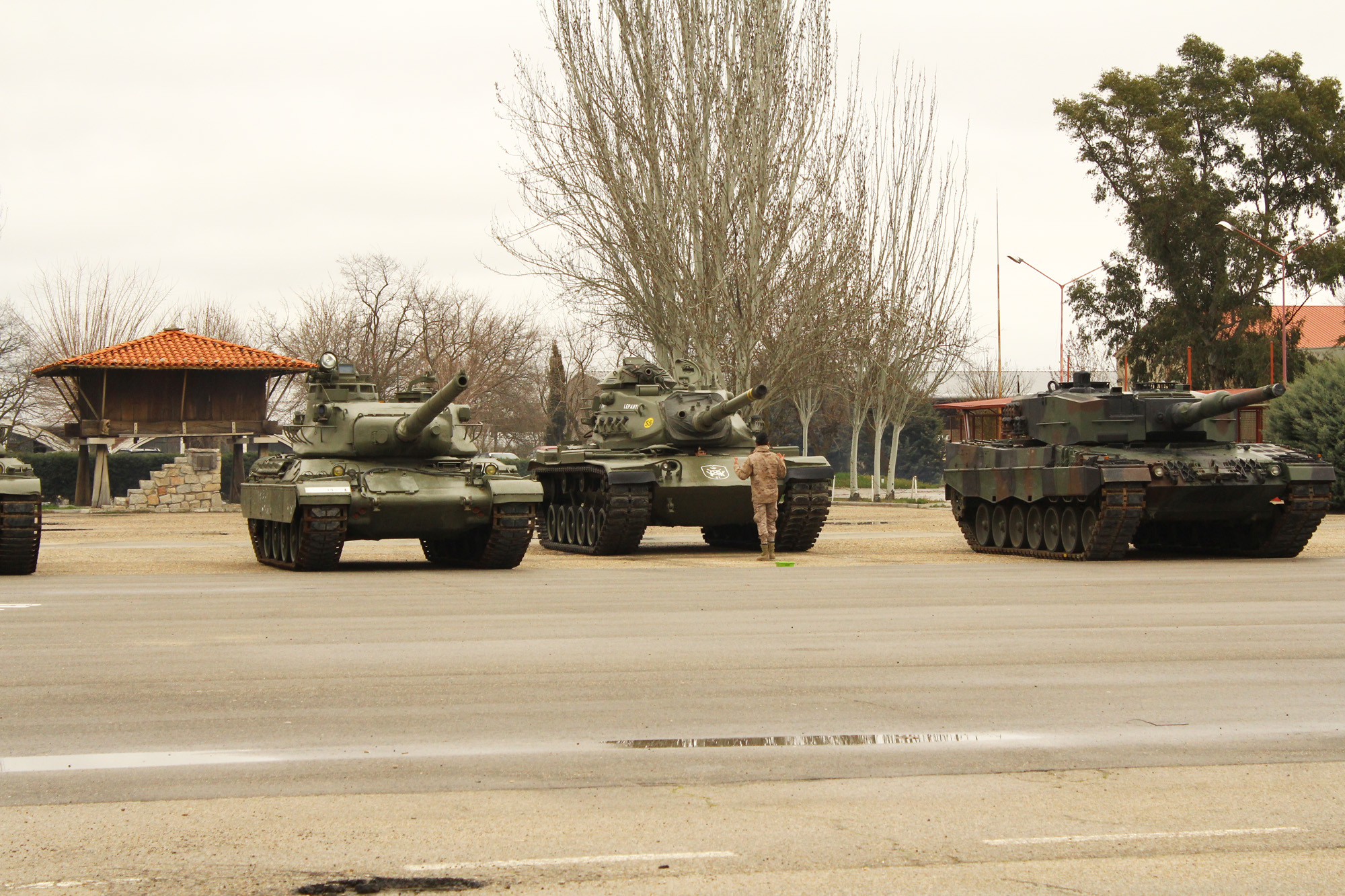
From left to right: an AMX-30E, a M60 Patton and a Leopard 2A4 in the Museum of Armored Units of El Goloso.

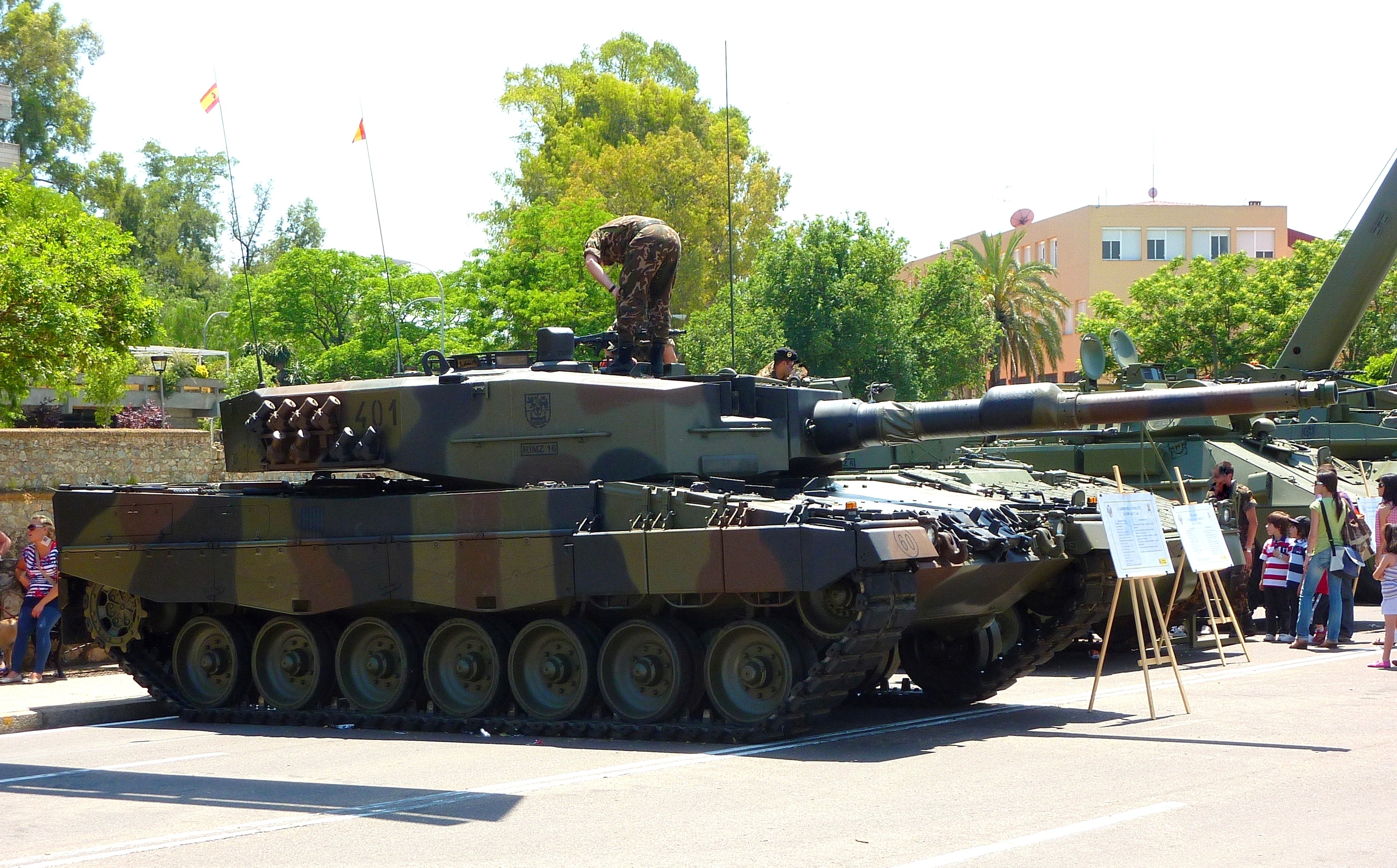
A Spanish Leopard 2A4 in 2010. Spain initially leased 108 Leopard 2A4s in 1995 from Germany. The lease was extended from 2001 to 2005. Later, it bought them for 15 million euros.

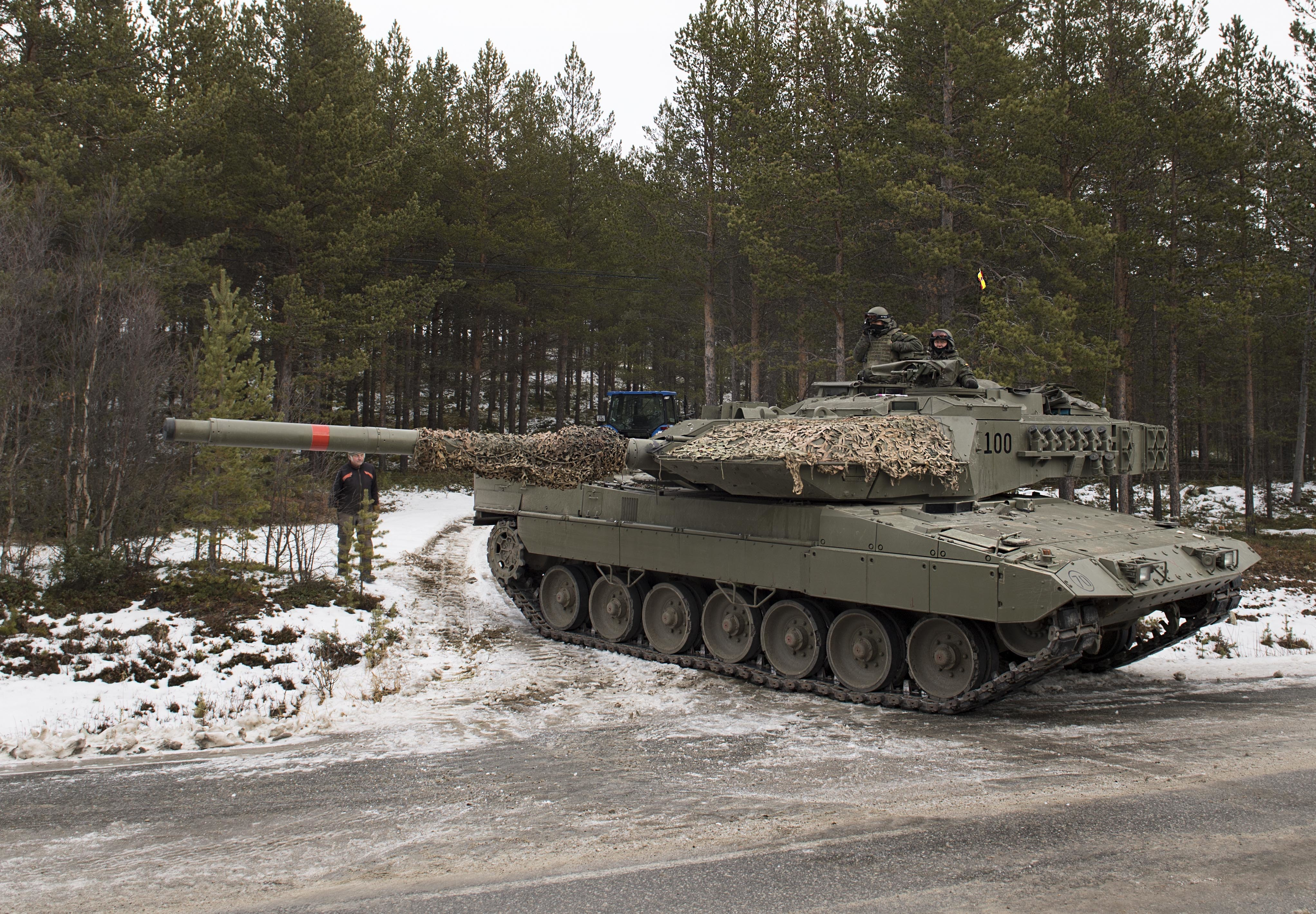
A Spanish Leopard 2E (Main battle tank) in 2018.

In the early 1990s, due large numbers of tanks were being withdrawn from Central Europe in compliance with the Treaty on Conventional Armed Forces in Europe the Spanish Army received 244 M60 tanks to replace its aging fleet of M47Es and M48Es, and its troublesome AMX-30EM1s. However, these did not represent a great improvement over the existing fleet, and as a result as early as 1994 the Spanish government had already begun to negotiate for a future Spanish tank, which would replace the M60. Although the Germans offered Spain surplus Leopard 1 tanks and Soviet equipment incorporated into the German Army after the reunification of Germany, the Spanish government declined these offers and pressed for the Leopard 2.

In March 1994, the Spanish Ministry of Defense created Programa Coraza 2000 (Programme Armour 2000), which focused on the procurement and integration of new armament for the Spanish Army's modernisation. The program included the procurement and integration of a Spanish derivative of the German Leopard 2, known as the Leopard 2E into the Spanish Army. The programme's scope extended to the integration of 108 Leopard 2A4s, which were leased to Spain in late 1995. Apart from procurement, Programa Coraza was meant to prepare the Spanish Army logistically for the introduction of new matériel.

A memorandum of understanding was signed on 9 June 1995 between the German and Spanish governments, setting the foundations for an acquisition of up to 308 brand-new Leopard 2Es. These were to be assembled in Spain by Santa Bárbara Sistemas, with 60–70 percent of the components manufactured by Spanish companies, and production taking place between 1998 and 2003. Furthermore, the German government agreed to lend the Spanish Army 108 Leopard 2A4s for training purposes for a period of five years. These vehicles were delivered between November 1995 and June 1996. In 1998, Spain agreed to procure the ceded Leopard 2A4s and reduce production of the brand-new Leopard 2E to 219 vehicles. In 2005 it was declared that the 108 Leopard 2A4s were to cost Spain 16.9 million euros, to be paid by 2016. The Leopard 2Es, based on the German Leopard 2A6, were produced between 2002 and 2008.

While the M60s were replaced by the Leopard 2s, the AMX-30EM2s were replaced by the Italian B1 Centauro anti-tank vehicle in the early years of the 2000s (decade).

== See also ==
- History of the tank
- List of interwar armoured fighting vehicles
- Tanks in World War II
- Tank classification
- List of military vehicles
- List of armoured fighting vehicles by country
