= Schneider-Brillié model 1909 =

First armored vehicle to ever enter battle in 1911

Armoured vehicle Schneider-Brillié model 1909
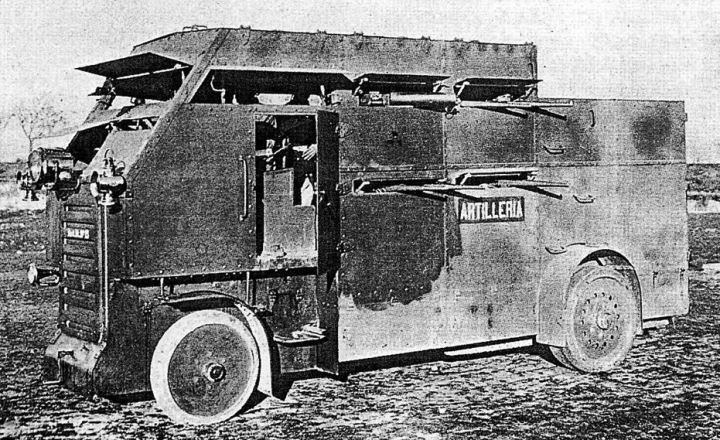
- "Schneider-Brillié" model 1909
- Type: Armored vehicle
- Place of origin: Spain – France

Service history
- In service: 1910–1915
- Used by: Spain
- Wars: Kert campaign Rif War

Production history
- Designer: Schneider
- Manufacturer: Spanish Army
- No. built: 2 (24 purchased)

Specifications
- Mass: 5,500 kg (12,100 lb)
- Crew: 2
- Armor: 5-mm rolled armor plates
- Main armament: 2 x 7 mm Vickers machine guns
- Secondary armament: Infantry rifles
- Engine: Schneider 4-cylinder petrol 6798 cc 40 hp (30 kW)
- Power/weight: 7,2 hp/tonne
- Operational range: 100 km
- Maximum speed: 18 km/h (11 mph)

The Spanish armored vehicle Schneider-Brillié model 1909 was the first armored vehicle to ever enter battle.

Based on a truck of French origin, the Spanish army transformed it into an armored car and was used in operations during the Kert campaign, armed with Vickers machine guns that were installed in Spain and rifles.

== Development ==
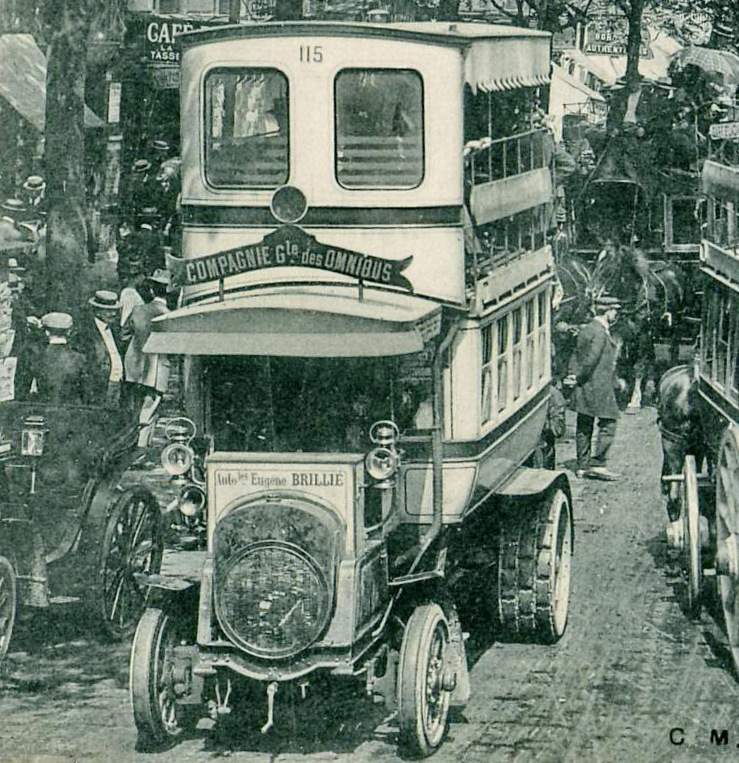
Brillié-Schneider P2 built for the parisian transportation company Compagnie générale des omnibus (between 1907 and 1911)

The Spanish Automobile Military Transport was established in 1879 when the Spanish Army decided to acquire steam locomotives for the transport and handling of coastal artillery pieces. Two Aveling & Porter mod. 1871 locomotives were purchased for the Royal Ordnance Factory in Trubia and the Royal Artillery in Seville. These locomotives were the first motorised vehicles of the Spanish Army.

In the first decade of the 20th century, the Spanish Army began to develop procedures for the acquisition and maintenance of motor vehicles.

The Spanish Army decided after the 1909 Second Melillan campaign to acquire unarmoured trucks "Schneider-Brillié" model 1909 based on unarmored trucks designed by the French engineer Eugène Brillié. The truck was built by the workshops of Schneider & Cie on the chassis of the Parisian double-decker bus Schneider-Brillié P2.

The Spanish Army wanted protection from small arms fire and the ability to transport soldiers or payloads inside the hull. In November 1909, King Alfonso XIII authorized the acquisition of what would become the first armored vehicle of the Spanish army: a Schneider-Brillié armored vehicle, model 1909. Still without an official name, the vehicle arrived in Spain on June 30, 1910, and five days later it was delivered to the Artillery Automotive School (Escuela de Automovilismo de Artilleria) located in Carabanchel. There it was given the name "Artillery n°15", and the inscription "ARTILLERIA" was written on the sides of the vehicle. During its first year in service, the vehicle was used to train mechanics and drivers, and the army tested the vehicle making trips from Carabanchel to Segovia, several times and by different routes, through the ports of León and Navacerrada.

Bolted and riveted to a wooden frame, the vehicle's hull consisted of 5-mm rolled armor plates. The Schneider company claimed that the armor could withstand a rifle-caliber bullet at a range of 100 meters.

The front of the armored vehicle contained the driver's seat and controls. The middle section of the vehicle was used as a troop transport compartment and could accommodate two machine gun crews and 10 soldiers with ammunition. For this reason, the hull of the vehicle was unusually high and had a pronounced box-like shape. The armament consisted of two 7 mm Vickers machine guns, mounted on the sides of the fighting compartment. The crews were able to fire personal weapons such as rifles and pistols due to the presence of embrasures on the sides. The rear fuselage was designed to accommodate payloads of up to 1500 kg.

The armored vehicle was equipped with a four-cylinder gasoline engine with an output of 40 hp at 1000 rpm. The transmission was manual with a 3-speed manual override, giving three forward speeds and one reverse. The base vehicle was a Schneider 4x2 commercial Ps-4000 truck chassis. The front wheels were single-steered front tires. The rear wheels were dual-drive. The tubeless tires were made by Continental. Since the wheels were spoked, Schneider made armored rims for them.

The armored vehicle had a fuel capacity of 100 liters. Its autonomy was 100 km at its optimum average technical speed. The maximum speed on well-paved roads was 18 km/h. The weight of the Schneider-Brillie 1909 armored vehicle, fully equipped with crew and armament, was 5500 kg. The vehicle was able to transport about 10 gunners, two riflemen, one driver, and one commander.

== Service ==
The Algeciras Conference took place in Algeciras, Spain, and lasted from 16 January to 7 April 1906 to find a solution to the First Moroccan Crisis of 1905 between France and Germany, which arose as Germany responded to France's effort to establish a protectorate over the independent state of Morocco.

The Spanish protectorate in Morocco was established on 27 November 1912 by a treaty between France and Spain that converted the Spanish sphere of influence in Morocco into a formal protectorate. The Spanish protectorate consisted of a northern strip on the Mediterranean and the Strait of Gibraltar, and a southern part of the protectorate around Cape Juby, bordering the Spanish Sahara.

After more than 19 months, the armored Schneider-Brillié "Artillery No. 15", was sent to the front on 17 January 1912.

Three days later, the vehicle arrived in Nador, where it was placed under the command of the artillery commander, Rafael de Carranza Garrido, and transferred days later to Zeluán. It was assigned missions such as supplying military posts, safe transportation of personnel, surveillance, protection of sensitive points, evacuation of the wounded. The Schneider-Brillié became the first armored vehicle to ever enter battle. The second armored vehicle to be used in combat was the Italian Automitragliatrice Corazzata Fiat Arsenale mod. 1912 during the Italo-Turkish War in September 1912 in Libya. At the end of the Kert campaign, the armor of the vehicle was removed and the vehicle was converted into a normal transport truck.

A second Schneider-Brillié "Artillery No. 19", similar to the previous one, was acquired in September 1911. It was assigned the Second Motorized Brigade at Melilla and sent to Tétouan, and later repatriated to the Artillery School in Madrid in 1915.

Based on the experience acquired with the Schneider-Brillié, the Spanish Army continued the development of armored vehicles and saw combat during the Rif war. Some of these armored vehicles, together with the Schneider CA-1, later took part at the beginning of the Spanish Civil War.

== See also ==
- Tanks in the Spanish Army
