= Sylvia Daunert =

Spanish-American bioanalytical chemist

Sylvia Daunert FRSC
- Education: University of Barcelona (PharmD, PhD); University of Michigan (MS)
- Awards: National Science Foundation CAREER Award; Fellow of the Royal Society of Chemistry; Fellow of the National Academy of Inventors
- Scientific career
- Fields: Bioanalytical chemistry; biosensors; nanotechnology
- Institutions: University of Miami Miller School of Medicine; University of Kentucky

Sylvia Daunert is a Spanish-American bioanalytical chemist and academic known for her work in biosensors, bioanalytical chemistry, and biomedical nanotechnology. She is a professor and the Lucille P. Markey Chair in the Department of Biochemistry and Molecular biology at the University of Miami Miller School of Medicine. Daunert has been elected a Fellow of the Royal Society of Chemistry and the National Academy of Inventors.

== Education ==
Daunert earned a PharmD from the University of Barcelona in 1982. She received a Master of Science in medicinal chemistry from the University of Michigan in 1985, followed by a PhD in bioanalytical chemistry from the University of Barcelona in 1991.

== Career ==
Daunert held faculty appointments at the University of Kentucky from 1994 to 2010, serving in the departments of chemistry and pharmaceutical sciences. She was later Gill Eminent Professor of Biological and Analytical Chemistry.

In 2010, she joined the University of Miami Miller School of Medicine as professor and Lucille P. Markey Chair in the Department of Biochemistry and Molecular Biology. She has held several leadership roles at the University of Miami, including Director of the Dr. JT Macdonald Foundation Biomedical Nanotechnology Institute, Director of Frost Institutes and University STEM Centers and Institutes, and Interim Director of the Frost Institute for Chemistry and Molecular Sciences.

== Research ==
Daunert's research is in bioanalytical chemistry, bionanotechnology, biosensor development, molecular diagnostics, and drug delivery, with applications in biomedical and environmental monitoring. A recurring theme in her work has been the use of genetically engineered proteins and living cells as analytical sensing systems. In 2000, Daunert and colleagues reviewed the use of genetically engineered whole-cell sensing systems that couple biological recognition with reporter genes. Related studies have examined bacterial biosensors for arsenite and arsenate in drinking water and whole-cell systems for detecting quorum sensing molecules such as autoinducer-2.

Her work has also addressed stimuli-responsive biomaterials and nanotechnology-based drug delivery. A 2005 study in Nature Materials reported the use of genetically engineered proteins to alter the responsive properties of hydrogels. Later collaborative work reviewed nanotechnology-based approaches to drug delivery and investigated nanodrug formulations for neurological and infectious-disease applications, including opioid antagonist nanodrugs for ischemic stroke and therapeutic nanoparticles for Zika virus.

Daunert's group and collaborators have developed point-of-care and paper-based diagnostic systems. These include a paper-strip and smartphone-based test for bacterial vaginosis and an isothermal point-of-care test for screening for SARS-CoV-2. During the COVID-19 pandemic, Florida Trend reported that University of Miami biomedical researchers led by Daunert were developing a point-of-care coronavirus test in collaboration with Heat Biologics.

Another area of her research concerns environmental and occupational exposure monitoring. In work associated with the Firefighter Cancer Initiative, Daunert and collaborators evaluated silicone wristbands as passive sampling systems for measuring polycyclic aromatic hydrocarbon exposure among firefighters. Her collaborative work on microbial signaling has also included studies of quorum-sensing molecules in disease-related contexts, including Crohn's disease and microbiome-associated depressive-like behavior in mice.

== Awards and honors ==
- National Science Foundation CAREER Award (1995)
- Cottrell Scholar Award, Research Corporation for Science Advancement (1997)
- A. F. Findeis Award, American Chemical Society (2001)
- Albert D. and Elizabeth H. Kirwan Memorial Prize, University of Kentucky (2009)
- Bill Barfield Award, Kentucky Water Resources Research Institute (2009)
- Provost's Award for Scholarly Activity, University of Miami (2014)
- Honorary title of Ilustrísima Señora Doctora, Spain (2015)
- Inducted into the Royal Academy of Pharmacy of Spain (2015)
- Academic d'Honor, Reial Acadèmia de Farmàcia de Catalunya (2016)
- Elected Member, Academy of Sciences of the Institute of Bologna (2022)
- Fellow of the Royal Society of Chemistry (2023)
- Elected Fellow, Academy of Sciences, Engineering and Medicine of Florida (2024)
- Elected Fellow, Global Academy of Nanotechnology (2025)
- Fellow, National Academy of Inventors (2025)
