= AMX-30E =

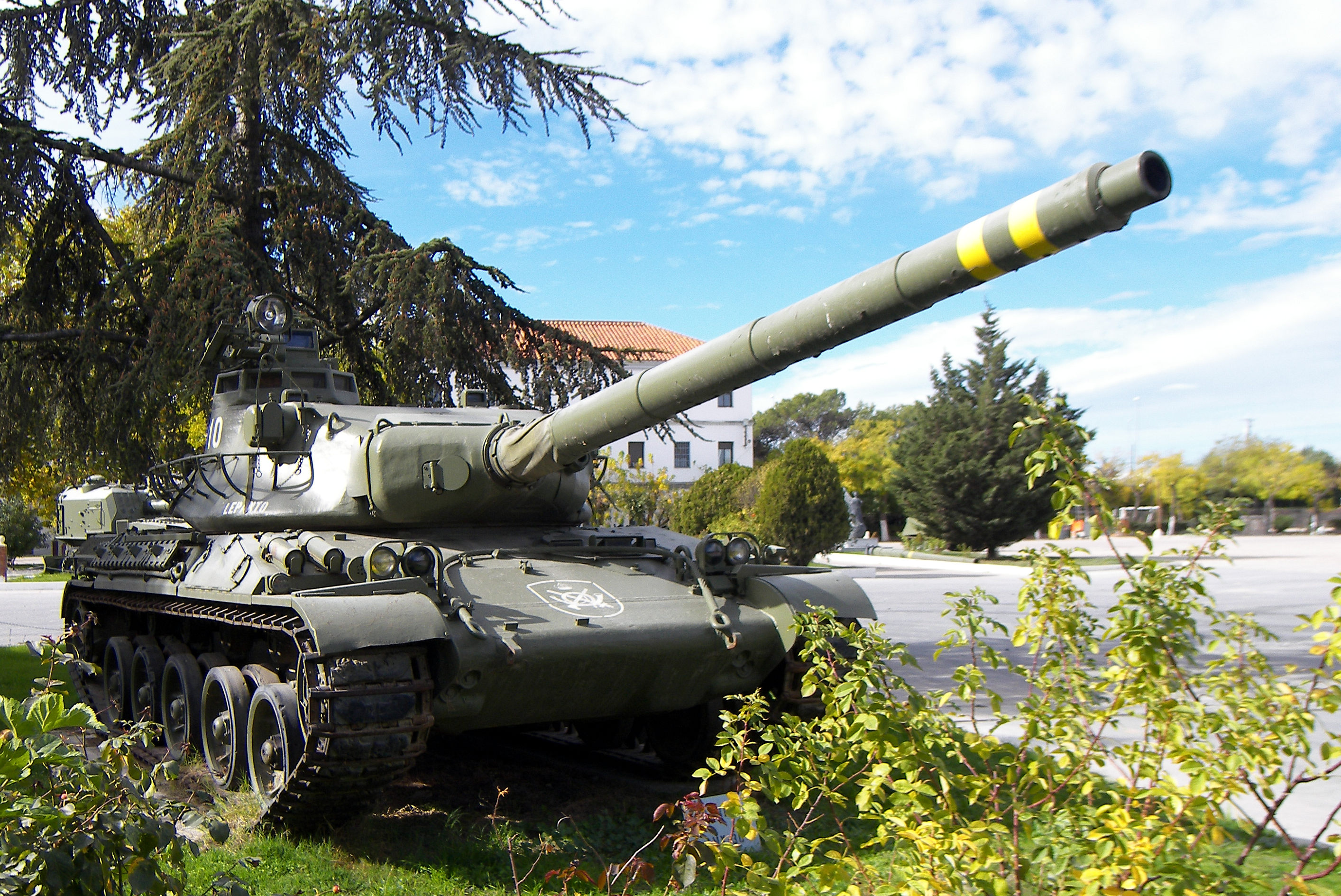
- An AMX-30E on display at the Museum of Armored Vehicles of El Goloso, in Spain
- Type: Main battle tank
- Place of origin: France; Francoist Spain / Spanish transition to democracy (1975–1982) / Spain

Service history
- In service: 1970–2002
- Used by: Spain

Production history
- Designer: GIAT
- Designed: 1974
- Manufacturer: Santa Bárbara Sistemas
- Produced: 1974–83 (manufactured in Spain)
- No. built: 299
- Variants: AMX-30EM1 & AMX-30EM2

Specifications
- Mass: 36 tonnes (39.68 short tons)
- Length: 9.48 meters (31.1 feet)(hull length)
- Width: 3.1 meters (10 feet)
- Height: 2.87 meters (9.4 feet)
- Crew: 4
- Armor: 80 mm (3.1 in)
- Main armament: 105 mm Modèle F1 tank gun (4.13 in)
- Secondary armament: 1× coaxial 12.7 mm M2 Browning machine gun 1× MG1S3A 7.62×51 mm NATO general-purpose machine gun roof-mounted
- Engine: Hispano-Suiza HS-110 12-cylinder 670.7 hp (500.1 kW)
- Power/weight: 20 metric horsepower to tonne (16.9 hp/STon)
- Transmission: 5SD-200D 5-speed
- Suspension: Torsion bar
- Ground clearance: .45 meters (1.5 feet)
- Fuel capacity: 962 liters (211.6 imp gal; 254.1 U.S. gal)
- Operational range: 400 kilometers (250 mi)
- Maximum speed: 65 kilometers per hour (40.39 mph)

The AMX-30E (E stands for España, Spanish for Spain) is a Spanish main battle tank based on France's AMX-30. Although originally the Spanish government sought to procure the German Leopard 1, the AMX-30 was ultimately awarded the contract due to its lower price and the ability to manufacture it in Spain. 280 units were manufactured by Santa Bárbara Sistemas for the Spanish Army, between 1974 and 1983.

First acquired in 1970, the tank was to supplement Spain's fleet of M47 and M48 Patton United States tanks and to reduce Spain's reliance on American equipment in its army. The first 19 AMX-30 tanks were acquired from France in 1970, while another 280 were assembled in Spain. It was Spain's first mass-produced tank and developed the country's industry to the point where the government felt it could produce a tank on its own, leading to the development of the Lince tank project in 1985. It also offered Santa Bárbara Sistemas the experience which led to the production of the Leopard 2E in late 2003. Although final assembly was carried out by Santa Bárbara Sistemas, the production of the AMX-30E also included other companies in the country. Total production within Spain amounted to as much as 65% of the tank.

Spain's AMX-30E fleet went through two separate modifications in the late 1980s, a modernization program and a reconstruction program. The former, named the AMX-30EM2 (150 tanks), sought to modernize and improve the vehicle's automotive characteristics, while the latter, or the AMX-30EM1 (149 tanks), resulted in a more austere improvement of the tank's power plant by maintaining the existing engine and replacing the transmission. Both programs extended the vehicle's lifetime. Spain's fleet of AMX-30EM1s was replaced in the late 1990s by the German Leopard 2A4, and the AMX-30EM2s were replaced by Centauro wheeled anti-tank vehicles in the early 21st century.

Although 19 AMX-30Es were deployed to the Spanish Sahara in 1970, the tank never saw combat. In 1985 Indonesia expressed interest in the AMX-30E, while in 2004 the Spanish and Colombian governments discussed the possible sale of around 40 AMX-30EM2s. Both trade deals fell through.

== Background ==
In 1960, Spain's tank fleet was composed mainly of American M47 Patton tanks, with some newer M48 Patton tanks. The M47s had been acquired by the Spanish army in the mid-1950s, replacing the previous fleet of 1930s-vintage Panzer I, T-26 and Panzer IV tank designs. During the 1957-58 Ifni War, the United States' ban on the usage of American ordnance supplied earlier as military aid to Spain pushed Spain to look for alternative equipment which could be freely employed in the Spanish Sahara.

In the early 1960s, Spain looked towards its European neighbors for a new tank. The Spanish government first approached Krauss-Maffei, the German manufacturer of the Leopard 1, and the company applied for an export license from the German Economics Ministry. Spain's status as a non-NATO country meant that the decision to grant the export license had to be reviewed by the Bundessicherheitsrat (Federal Security Council), or the BSR, which was responsible for the coordination of the national defense policy. Ultimately, the council ruled that Krauss-Maffei could sign an export contract with Spain. The deal was, however, stalled by pressure from the United Kingdom's Labour Party on the basis that the Leopard's 105-millimeter (4.13 in) L7 tank gun was British technology. Meanwhile, Spain tested the French AMX-30 between 2 and 10 June 1964.

The Leopard 1 and the AMX-30 originated from a joint tank development program known as the Europanzer. For a tank, the AMX-30 had a low silhouette; the height of the tank was 2.28 meters (7.5 feet), compared to the Leopard's 2.6 meters (8.5 feet). In terms of lethality, the AMX-30's Obus G high-explosive anti-tank (HEAT) round was one of the most advanced projectiles at the time. Because HEAT warheads become less efficient during spin stabilization induced by the rifling of a tank-gun barrel, the Obus G was designed so that the shaped charge warhead was mounted on ball bearings within an outer casing, allowing the round to be spin stabilized through the rifling of the gun without affecting the warhead inside. The Obus G was designed to penetrate up to 400 millimetres (16 inches) of steel armor. On the other hand, the Leopard was armed with the L7A3 tank gun, capable of penetrating the frontal armor of most contemporary tanks. Although the Leopard boasted greater armor than the AMX-30—partially accounting for the weight difference between the two tanks—the latter was sold at a cheaper price.

	M47 Patton	M48 Patton	Leopard	AMX-30
Weight	46.44 t (51.19 short tons)	53.5 t (58.97 tons)	42.2 t (46.52 tons)	36 t (39.68 tons)
Gun	90 mm L/48 M36 rifled (3.54 inches)	90 mm L/48 M41 rifled (3.54 in)	105 mm L7A3 rifled (4.13 in)	105 L/56 F2 rifled (4.13 in)
Ammunition	71 rounds	62 rounds	55 rounds	50 rounds
Road range	128 km (80 mi)	482.8 km (300.0 mi)	600 km (370 mi)	500–600 km (310–370 mi)
Engine output	810 PS (595.75 kW)	750 PS (551.62 kW)	830 PS (610 kW)	680 PS (500.14 kW)
Maximum speed	48 km/h (30 mph)	48.28 km/h (30.00 mph)	62 km/h (39 mph)	65 km/h (40 mph)

In May 1970, the Spanish government decided to sign a contract with the French company GIAT to begin production of the AMX-30. However, it was not the advantages of the French vehicle itself that influenced the decision. Rather, it was the UK's unwillingness to sell their L7 tank-gun, the low cost of the AMX-30, and the French offer to allow Spain to manufacture the tank, that led the Spanish Army to favor the French armored vehicle.

== Production ==
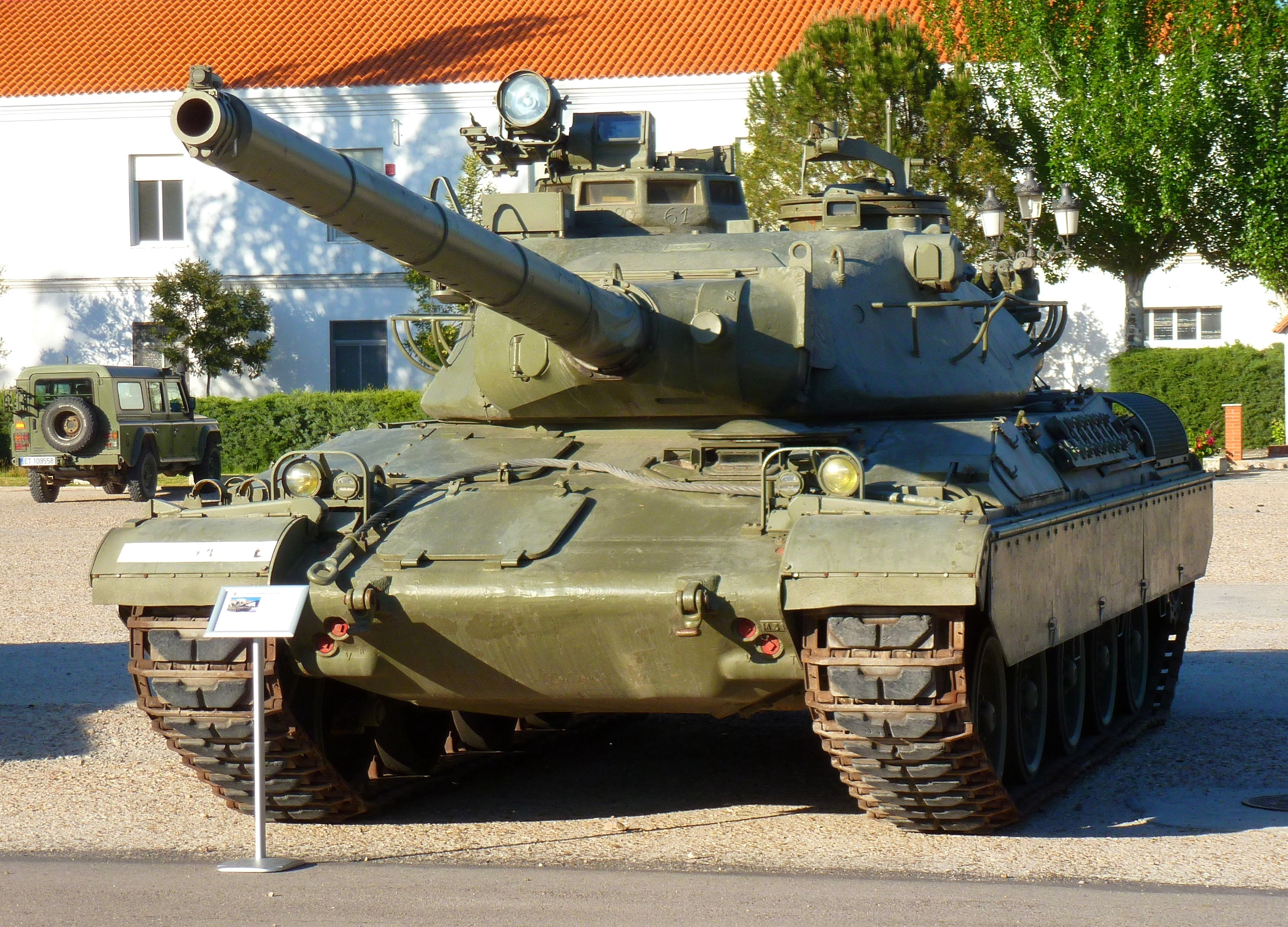
Front view of an AMX-30E

On 22 June 1970, the Spanish Ministry of Defense signed an agreement of military cooperation with France, which outlined plans for the future acquisition of around 200 tanks for the Spanish Army. Of these, 180 were to be manufactured under license in Spain and 20 were to be manufactured by France. Ultimately, GIAT was contracted to manufacture 19 tanks. These were delivered to the Spanish Legion's Bakali company, deployed in the Spanish Sahara. The first six AMX-30s were delivered by rail to the Spanish border city of Irún, in the Basque Country, and then transferred to Bilbao. Finally, they were shipped by the Spanish Navy, on the transport Almirante Lobo, to El Aaiún in the Spanish Sahara. This unit existed until 1975, when it was disbanded and its tanks transferred to the Uad-Ras Mechanized Infantry Regiment.

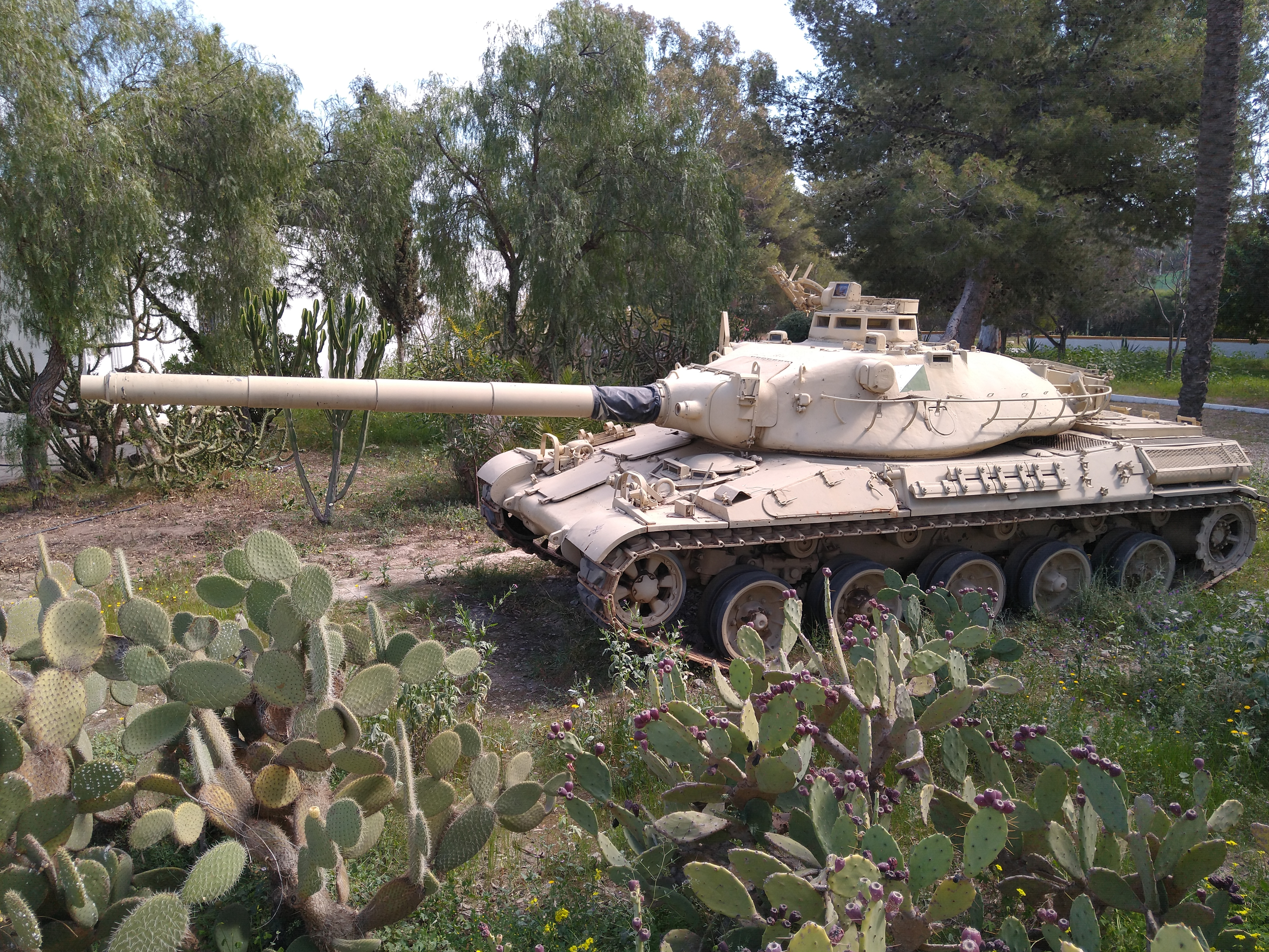
An AMX-30E in the Museographic Collection of the Spanish Legion in Almería

This agreement laid the foundations for the upcoming tank plant at the industrial polygon of Las Canteras, near the town of Alcalá de Guadaíra. Several parts of the tank were subcontracted to other Spanish companies, including Astilleros Españoles (turret), Boetticher, Duro Felguera and E. N. Bazán. The grade of local production varied per batch. The first 20 tanks were to have 18% of each vehicle manufactured in Spain; the next 40 would have 40% of the vehicle manufactured in Spain. The other 120 had 65% of the tank manufactured in the country. Production began in 1974, at a rate of five tanks per month, and ended on 25 June 1979. The first five tanks were delivered to the Uad Ras Mechanized Infantry Regiment on 30 October 1974. This batch also replaced the M41 Walker Bulldog light tanks and M48 Patton tanks in the Armored Cavalry Regiment Villaviciosa and the Armored Infantry Regiment Alcázar de Toledo, receiving 23 and 44 tanks, respectively.

On 27 March 1979, prior to the end of production of the first batch, the Spanish Army and Santa Bárbara Sistemas signed a contract for the production and delivery of a second batch of 100 AMX-30Es. In 1980, after the 200th AMX-30E was delivered to the Spanish Army, the tank's patent was awarded to Spain. This allowed minor modifications to be done to the vehicle without having to consult GIAT. It also meant that the degree of local construction of each vehicle augmented considerably. Production of the second batch lasted between 1979 and 1983. By the time production ended, the Spanish Army fielded 299 AMX-30Es (280 produced between 1974 and 1983, and 19 delivered from France in 1970) and 4 training vehicles delivered in 1975. Santa Bárbara Sistemas also manufactured 18 Roland España (denominated AMX-30RE) anti-air vehicles and 10 AMX-30D armored recovery vehicles. The average cost per tank, in the first batch, was 45 million pesetas (US$642,800). Cost per tank increased during the second batch to 62 million pesetas (885,700 dollars).

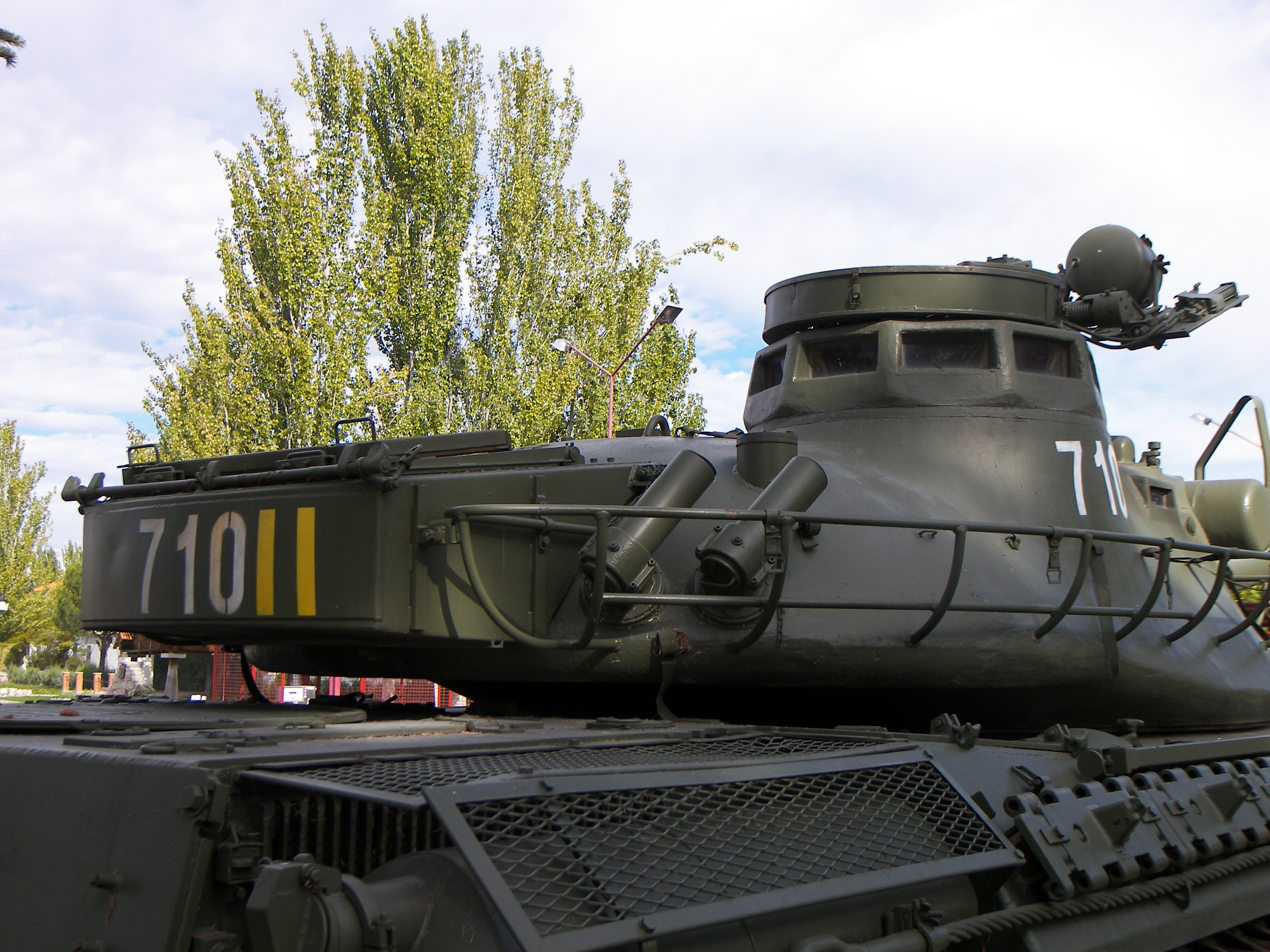
Close-up of the AMX-30E's turret bustle, grenade launchers and commander's hatch

Although brand new, the AMX-30E entered service with automotive issues, including problems with the antiquated 5SD-200D transmission. Consequently, as the first production batch began to end, the Spanish Army and Santa Bárbara Sistemas began to study possible upgrades. The main objectives were to increase the power and the reliability of the power pack, an improvement to the tank's firepower and accuracy, as well as to increase the vehicle's ballistic protection and overall survivability. A number of modernization packages were proposed, including a suggestion to mount the AMX-30E's turret on a Leopard 1's chassis. Other options included swapping the existing power pack for a new American diesel engine and transmission or exchanging the power pack for a new German diesel engine and transmission. More austere versions of these same options were offered, pairing the existing HS-110 engine with the already mentioned transmissions. Another prototype was produced using the Leopard's more modern tracks, and another similar prototype mounted a new 12.7-millimeter (0.5 in) machine gun for the loader's position. France's GIAT also offered to modernize Spain's AMX-30Es to AMX-30B2 standards, a modernization being applied to French AMX-30s.

=== Modernization ===
Ultimately, a mixed solution named Tecnología Santa Bárbara-Bazán (Santa Bárbara-Bazán Technology) (or TSB) was chosen. The improvement of the tank's mobility entailed replacing the HS-110 diesel engine with an MTU 833 Ka-501 diesel engine, producing 850 metric horsepower (625 kW), and the transmission with a German ZF LSG-3000, compatible with engines of up to 1,500 metric horsepower (1103 kW). The first 30 engines were to have 50% of the engine manufactured in Spain; the rest, 73% were to be produced indigenously. This new engine gave the modernized tank a power ratio of 23 metric horsepower per tonne (21.13 hp/S/T). The new engine was coupled with the AMX-30B2's improved torsion-bar suspension, which used larger diameter torsion-bars and new shocks.

To improve the tank's firepower, the gun mount around the loader's turret hatch was modified to allow the installation of a 12.7-millimeter (0.5 in) machine gun, while the main gun's firepower was augmented through the introduction of the new CETME437A armor-piercing, fin-stabilized discarding sabot (APFSDS). The gun's accuracy was improved through the installation of the new Mark 9 modification A/D fire control system, designed by Hughes Aircraft Company. The new system allowed firing during the day and during night operations, and increased the likelihood of a first round impact. The fire control system was also modernized through the exchange of the old M282 gunner's periscope with a new periscope and a new Nd:YAG laser rangefinder. A new ballistics computer, the NSC-800, was issued, as well as a new digital panel for the gunner, designed and manufactured by the Spanish company INISEL. The tank commander also received a control unit that allowed the choice of ammunition for the gun and provided information on the ballistics of the round and the target to be engaged. As a result, the loader received a presentation unit to display information on which round to load into the gun's breech and to communicate ballistic data received, including angular velocity, wind velocity, gun elevation and vehicle inclination. The fire control system also allowed for the future upgrade to a more sophisticated stabilization system for the tank's main gun. Survivability improvements included the addition of new steel side-skirts, a new smoke generating system linked to the engine and a new fire suppression system.

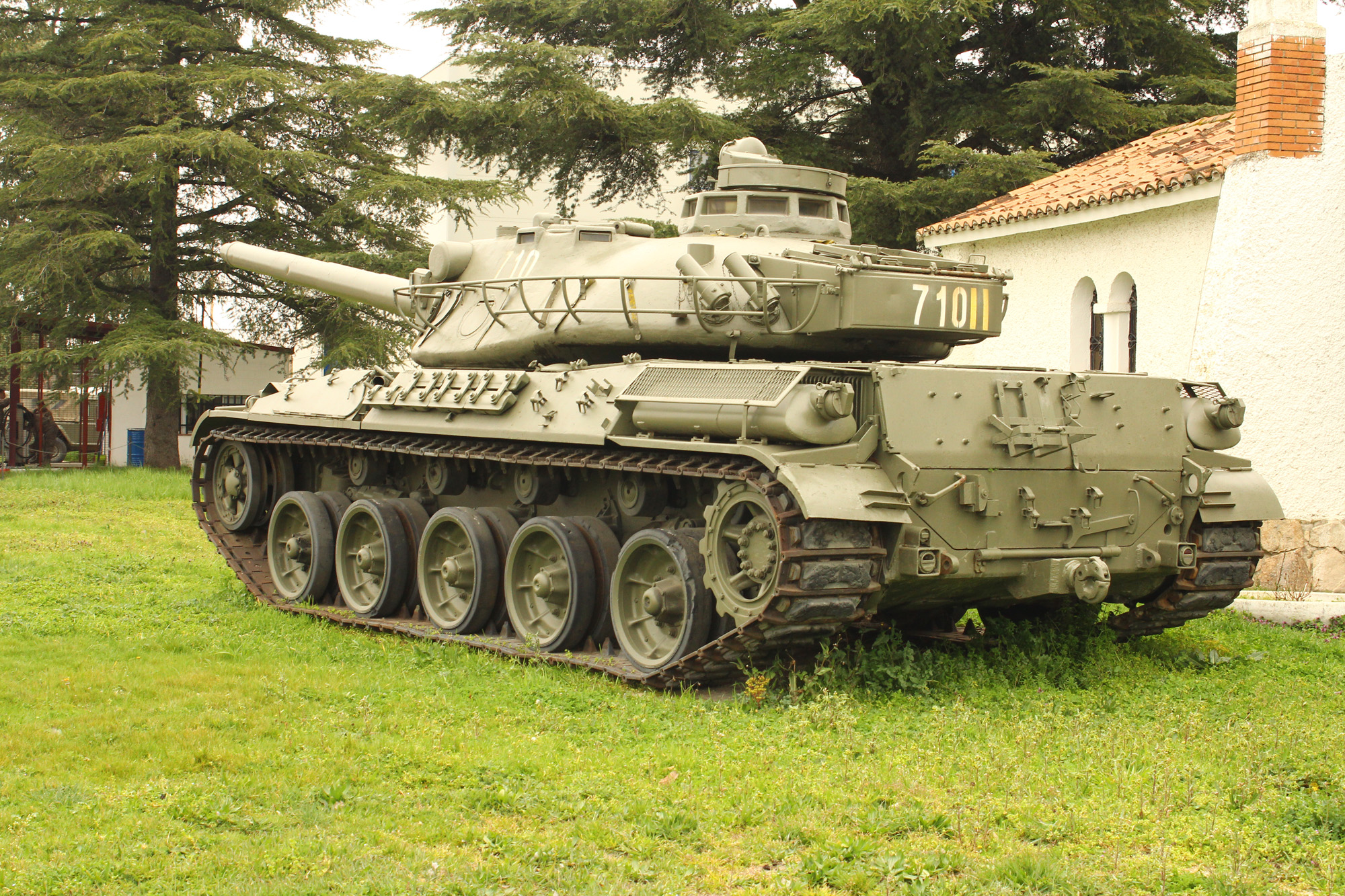
A side and back view of the AMX-30E on display at El Goloso

One hundred fifty AMX-30Es received this modernization package and were designated AMX-30EM2s. The program began in 1989 and ended in 1993. Ultimately, Spain's AMX-30EM2s were replaced by brand-new Centauro anti-tank vehicles, which were partially manufactured in Spain, in the early 21st century.

=== Reconstruction ===
The other 149 AMX-30Es were reconstructed to improve their mobility. The reconstruction consisted of the replacement of the original French transmission with the American Allison CD-850-6A. Furthermore, several parts of the tank, such as the brakes, were renovated in order to bring them up to their original standards. The CD-850-6A was an automatic transmission, with a triple differential providing two forward velocities and one reverse velocity. However, the new transmission resulted in a new problem. The excessive heat produced by the transmission reduced the vehicle's range. The reconstruction of the 149 AMX-30Es began in 1988, and these were designated AMX-30EM1s. In the early 1990s Spain received a large number of M60 Patton tanks, replacing its fleet of M47s and M48s, as well as its AMX-30EM1s.

== Export ==
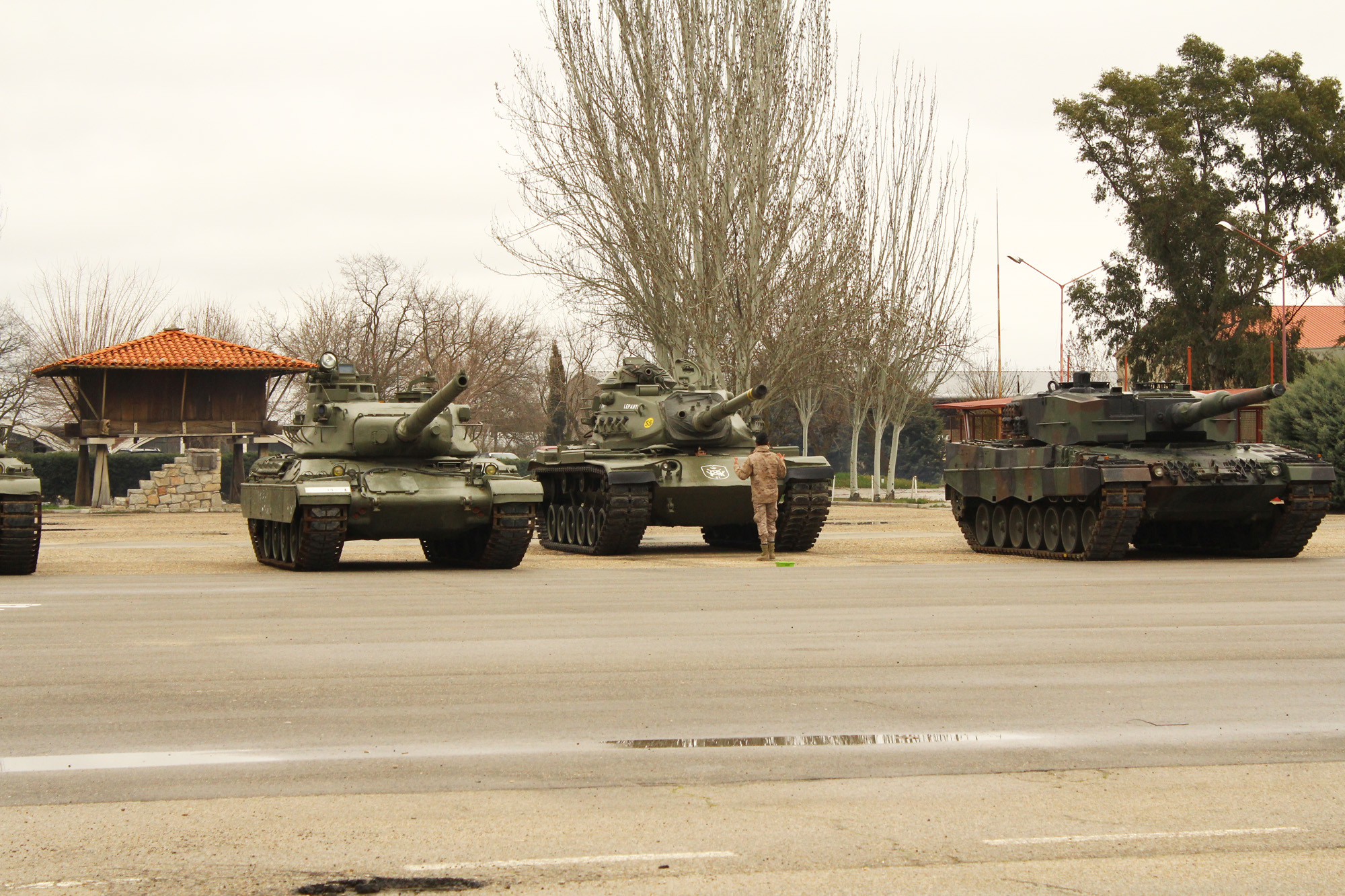
From left to right: an AMX-30E, a M60 Patton and a Leopard 2A4 in the Museum of Armored Units of El Goloso.

In the mid-1980s Indonesia approached Spain in an attempt to procure armaments for the modernization of its armed forces. Of the possible armaments for sale, Indonesia expressed interest in the procurement of the AMX-30. Although this deal fell through, in 2004 the Spanish and Colombian governments agreed on the sale of between 33 and 46 second-hand AMX-30EM2s, which had recently been replaced in the Spanish Army. However, the deal was cancelled after José María Aznar was replaced by José Luis Rodríguez Zapatero as prime minister of Spain, and the new Spanish government declared that Spain didn't even have enough AMX-30EM2s in working condition to sell to Colombia.

== See also ==
- Tanks in the Spanish Army
- List of armoured fighting vehicles by country
