= Lince (tank) =

Spanish proposed main battle tank

- Mock-up of the German-Spanish Lince
- Type: Main battle tank
- Place of origin: Spain, West Germany

Specifications
- Mass: 49 t (54 short tons)
- Length: 7.10 m
- length: (Length with gun) 9.068 metres (29.75 ft)
- Width: 3.74 m (12.3 ft)
- Height: 2.50 m (8.2 ft)
- Crew: 4
- Armor: Composite armour
- Main armament: Rheinmetall 120 mm L/44 tank-gun (4.72 inches)
- Secondary armament: 2 x 7.62 mm machine guns
- Engine: MTU MB 871 Ka 501 12-Cylinder Diesel Engine; 1,200 hp (890 kW)
- Power/weight: 24.50 hp (18.27 kW) per tonne
- Suspension: Torsion bar
- Operational range: 550 km (340 mi)
- Maximum speed: 70 km/h (43 mph)

The Lince (Spanish pronunciation: [ˈlinθe], meaning "Lynx") was a Spanish development programme for a proposed main battle tank that unfolded during the late 1980s and early 1990s. The intention was to replace the M47 and M48 Patton tanks that the Spanish Army had received under the U.S. Mutual Defense Assistance Act between 1954 and 1975, and to complement the AMX-30E tanks manufactured for the army during the 1970s. Companies from several nations, such as German Krauss-Maffei, Spanish Santa Bárbara, and French GIAT, made bids for the development contract. The main priorities were mobility and firepower, with secondary priority placed on protection; the Lince tank was to have been lighter and faster than its competitors. To achieve a sufficient level of firepower and protection, the Lince was to use Rheinmetall's 120 mm L/44 tank-gun and German composite armour from the Leopard 2A4.

The Spanish government decided to upgrade its fleet of AMX-30Es in the late 1980s. The focus on upgrading Spain's AMX-30E's distracted attention from the Lince plan, which was eventually shelved in 1990 after Spain acquired many M60 Patton tanks, which were no longer required by the U.S., in accordance with the Treaty on Conventional Armed Forces in Europe. These tanks replaced the M47s and M48s, and fulfilled Spain's need to modernize its tank forces in the short term. No prototype of the planned Lince tank was manufactured, and no announcements were made on who would receive the contract. Four years later the Spanish government procured and locally manufactured the Leopard 2, fulfilling the long-term modernisation goal established in the Lince programme.

== Background ==
During the 1950s the Spanish Army was supplied by the United States with 552 M47 and M48 Patton tanks as a mutual defense pact against a potential Soviet invasion of Western Europe. The first tanks were delivered in 1954, and the fleet was upgraded in the 1970s to equal the capabilities of M60 Patton tanks. Spain was, however, interested in replacing these tanks as early as the 1960s with the French AMX-30 or German Leopard 1. Spain eventually decided to buy the French tank and by 1975 the Spanish Army had 299 AMX-30s, designated as AMX-30Es. Of these, 280 tanks were manufactured by the local company Empresa Nacional Santa Bárbara (now Santa Bárbara Sistemas) who received the AMX-30 patent from the French company GIAT. As the first batch of production of AMX-30s ended, the French Army and Santa Bárbara began a research programme for an eventual modernisation of the AMX-30 to correct deficiencies such as mechanical reliability, armour protection and the fire control system. In fielding the AMX-30E, the army found its upgraded M47s and M48s to be outdated; its earliest M47 tank was more than 30 years old. The army required a modern tank that could complement its AMX-30Es and started looking for a replacement for its Patton fleet.

== Bidding ==
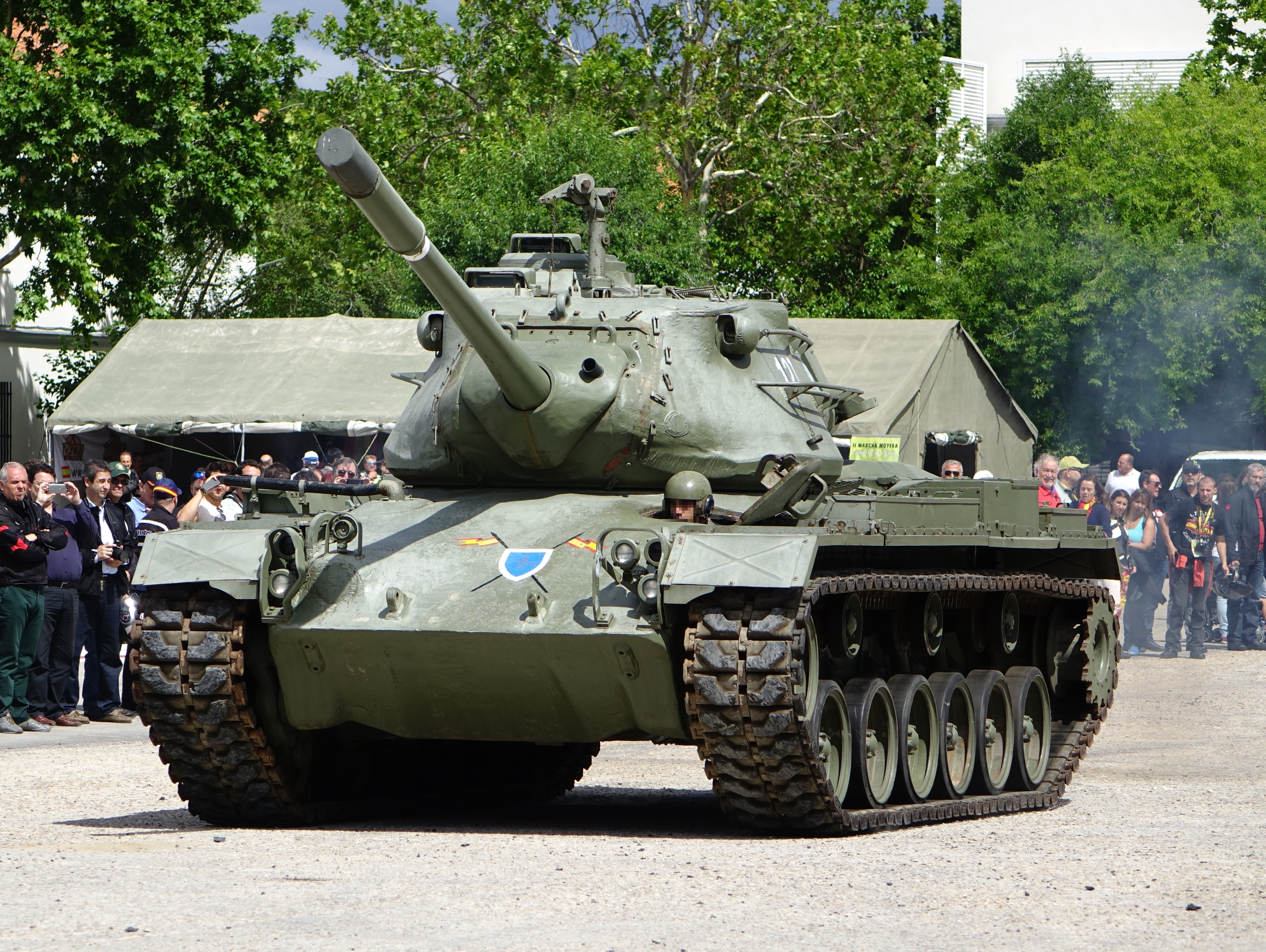
A Spanish M47 Patton. Despite being completely obsolete, serving practically nothing more than for instruction, the M-47s were for decades the most numerous tanks in the Spanish arsenal.

In 1984, the Spanish Ministry of Defense declared its intent to set aside 120 billion pesetas (1.1 billion U.S. dollars) for a future tank program and attracted interest from five foreign companies. German company Krauss-Maffei and Spanish company Santa Bárbara presented a joint bid in mid-1984 that would produce a tank based on 1970s technology. The French government proposed to cooperate with Spain in designing a tank complete with new technology—France would later develop this programme on its own as the Leclerc. However, the French admitted that there would be restrictions placed on Empresa Nacional Santa Bárbara when it came to exporting the tank. The Italian government proposed a similar deal for a cooperative tank design. The American company General Dynamics and British company Vickers offered the M1 Abrams and Valiant, respectively; the Spanish government rejected their offers the following year because of the low likelihood of local production and export of the tank. By late 1985, the only offers still under consideration were those from the German-Spanish collaboration and the French and Italian governments.

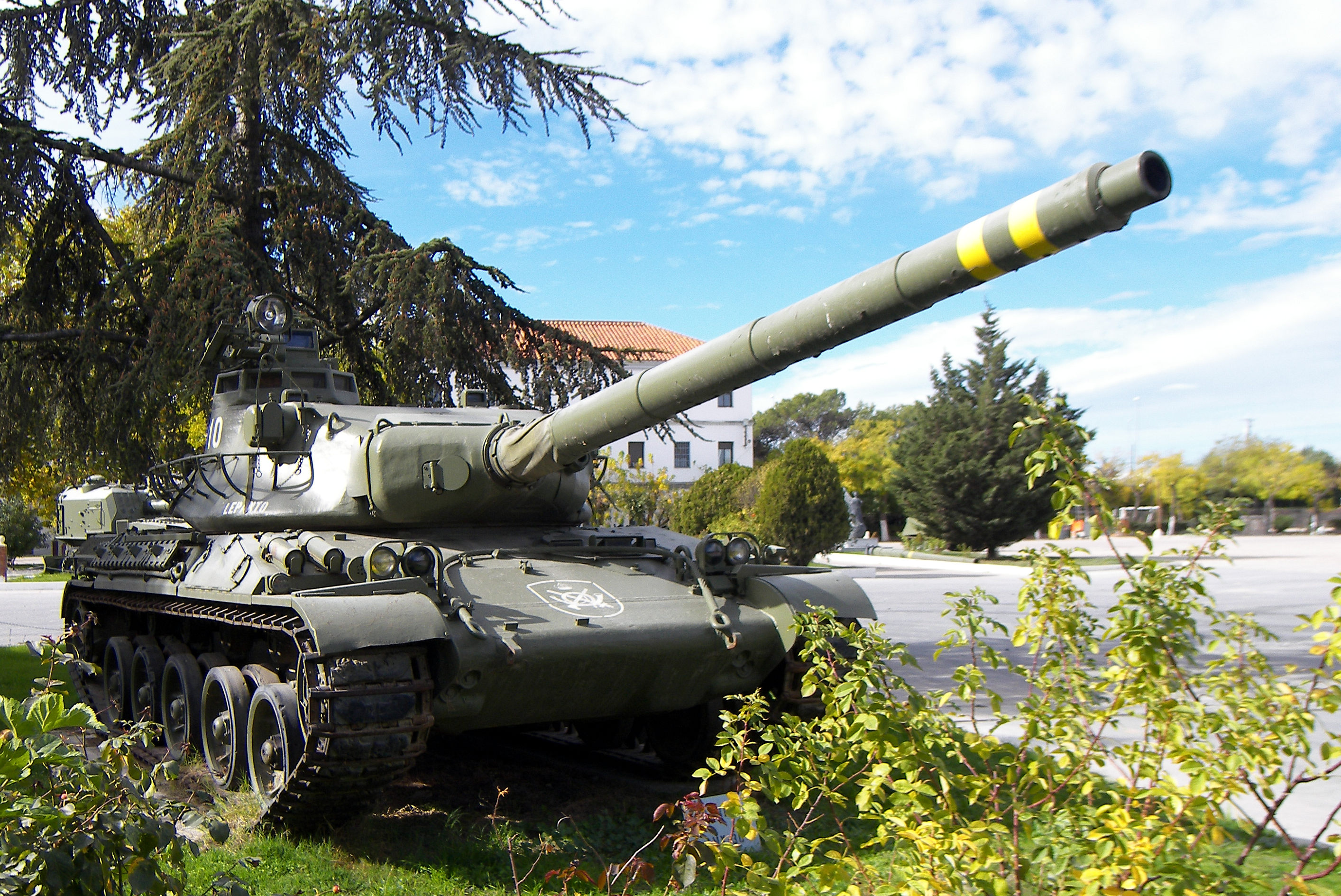
The Lince programme was meant to complement Spain's fleet of AMX-30Es, such as the one pictured.

Krauss-Maffei's Lince bid provided the clearest technical designs. The tank would be 49 tonnes and equipped with a 120-millimeter main gun. It could fire this gun on the move and aim at targets with effectiveness in day and night operations. Fitted with a 1,200 horsepower (890 kW) engine, the Lince could travel as fast as 70 kilometres per hour (43 mph) on the roads. Although heavily based on the Leopard 2A4, the Lince was smaller and lighter, trading protection for mobility. Specifically, the Lince prioritised enhanced mobility over the irregular Spanish terrain. Furthermore, size restrictions were imposed because of the existing capabilities of Spain's railroad and highway network. Although the reduced armour conflicted with the problems that the Spanish had with AMX-30E's thin armour, the Lince used a multilayer armour similar to that of the German Leopard 2A4, providing greater protection than standard armour for a similar weight. The protection was further enhanced by the low profile turret, again similar to that of the Leopard 2A4.

In early 1986, the Ministry of Defense declared that it would choose a contract within a matter of months. News sources cited said that Krauss-Maffei would most likely gain the contract, although the French might get it because of past and existing French armament contracts with Spain. Apart from producing the French-designed AMX-30, the Spanish government also had a contract for Mirage F1 fighter planes and Puma utility helicopters in 1979. In early 1987, France again offered Spain the contract to co-develop and co-produce the AMX-Leclerc. This time it added the lucrative term of joint export. Despite the offer and ongoing collaboration with the Italians, Spanish investment in the German-Spanish Lince program grew to 200 billion pesetas (1.8 billion dollars). However, the Spanish government did not announce a winner for the contract. This indecision led Krauss-Maffei to freeze its bid for the Lince. Krauss-Maffei also cited the loss of millions of dollars because of failures on the part of Santa Bárbara Sistemas, who would manufacture the Lince.

== Decline of the programme ==
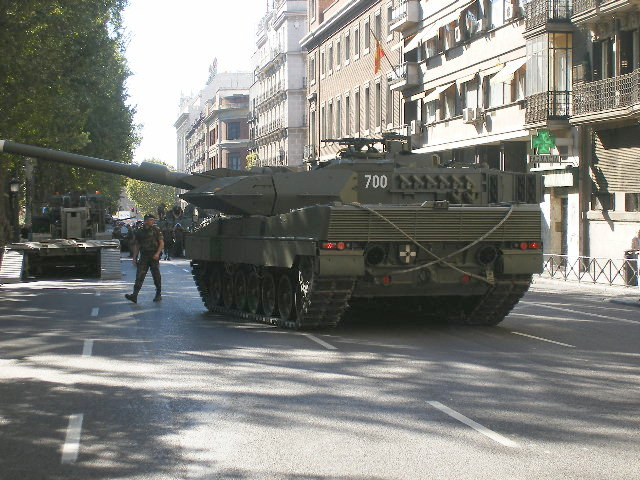
Due to the cancellation of the Lince, Spain opted to procure 219 Leopard 2Es in the late 1990s.

The Spanish Ministry of Defense agreed to modernise the Army's AMX-30Es in 1987 and allotted 16 billion pesetas (155 million dollars) to the programme. From July 1987, the Army upgraded its entire AMX-30E fleet to EM1 and EM2 standards. This upgraded programme posed a threat to the Lince programme. Around the same time, the Spanish government expressed interest in acquiring American M60 Patton tanks that were being retired from Central Europe, in accordance with the Treaty on Conventional Armed Forces in Europe. In October and November, the Spanish government began to negotiate for 400 to 500 M60A1 and M60A3 tanks, and planned to upgrade its acquired M60A1 tanks to M60A3 standards. In December, the United States agreed to transfer 532 M60A1 and M60A3 tanks to replace Spain's M47s and M48s. After receiving 50 of the 272 A1s, Spain cancelled procurement of these tanks and opted to receive only the 260 M60A3s. Because of the modernisation of the AMX-30, the decision to replace older Patton tanks with the M60A3 and Krauss-Maffei's criticism of the management of the indigenous tank programme, the Lince was canceled in 1989. Management issues in Santa Bárbara Sistemas also played a part, including yearly negative balances and the reduction of factory personnel. However, unlike the planned Lince, the M60s only satisfied Spain's immediate need to modernise the Army's tank fleet in the short term. They were not a long-term modernisation solution as Spain's M47s and M48s had already been upgraded to equivalents of the M60.

As a result, Spain negotiated with Germany over the procurement and local production of many Leopard 2A5s; a Memorandum of Understanding was signed between the two in 1995, and the Germans lent 108 Leopard 2A4s to the Spanish Army for five years starting in 1998. In 2005, the Spanish Ministry of Defense declared intention to buy the tanks instead of renting them. The local production terms in the Memorandum allowed Santa Bárbara Sistemas to start producing Leopard 2Es in 2003, and the first platoon of tanks was delivered in December 2003. In comparison to the smaller Lince, the Leopard 2A4 weighs 55 t (61 short tons) and is powered by a 1,500 hp (1,100 kW) diesel engine. The greater weight of the Leopard 2A4 is due in part to its thicker armour, affording greater protection and balancing out the loss in mobility as compared to the Lince.

== Comparison to the alternatives ==
| | Lince | Leopard 2A4 | Leclerc | M1A1 Abrams | M60A3 Patton |
|---|---|---|---|---|---|
| Weight | 49 t (54 short tons) | 55 t (61 short tons) | 55.6 t (61.3 short tons) | 57.10 t (62.94 short tons) | 55.6 t (61.3 short tons) |
| Gun | 120 mm L/44 smoothbore | 120 mm L/44 smoothbore | 120m mm L/52 smoothbore | 120 mm L/44 smoothbore | 105 mm M68 rifled tank-gun |
| Ammunition | 40 rounds | 42 rounds | 40 rounds | 40 rounds | 63 rounds |
| Road range | 550 km (340 mi) | 500 km (310 mi) | 550 km (340 mi) | 450 km (280 mi) | 480 km (300 mi) |
| Engine output | 1,200 hp (890 kW) | 1,500 hp (1,100 kW) | 1,500 hp (1,100 kW) | 1,500 hp (1,100 kW) | 750 hp (560 kW) |
| Maximum speed | 70 km/h (43 mph) | 68 km/h (42 mph) | 71 km/h (44 mph) | 64 km/h (40 mph) | 48.28 km/h (30.00 mph) |

== See also ==
- Tanks in the Spanish Army
- List of armoured fighting vehicles by country

== Bibliography ==
- "Cinco empresas compiten para cofabricar un carro de combate en España". El País (in Spanish). 29 October 1984.
- "El tanque de los noventa". El País (in Spanish). 2 November 1990.
- "Europe". Military Technology. Mönch Editorial Group: 95. 1 January 2006.
- "Carros de Combate Modernos". Maquinas de Guerra (in Spanish). Vol. 1. Planeta-Agostini. 1984.
- "Spain Finalizes Buy of 108 Leopard 2A4 Tanks". Defense Industry Daily. 8 September 2005.
- Bassetts, Lluís (19 January 1987). "Francia ofrece a España la fabricación conjunta de un moderno carro de combate". El País (in Spanish).
- C., P. (2 June 1986). "El INI y un ente público italiano firmarán un protocolo de colaboración" (in Spanish). El País.
- Candil, Antonio (March 1999). Carros de Combate: Evolución, Presente y Futuro (PDF) (in Spanish). Madrid: Isdefe. ISBN 84-89338-18-3. Archived from the original (PDF) on 18 March 2009.
- Candil, Antonio (1 March 2004). "Leopard 2E MBT Delivery Begins". Military Technology. Mönch Editorial Group: 2.
- Candil, Antonio. "Un entorno industrial plagado de dificultades: La fabricación del Carro de Combate Leopard 2E en España (I)". Fuerza Terrestre (in Spanish). 3 (49). MC Ediciones: 8.
- de Mazarrasa, Javier (1990). Carro de Combate AMX-30E (in Spanish). Aldaba Militaria. p. 104. ISBN 84-86629-29-2.
- Green, Michael (2005). M1 Abrams at War. St. Paul, MN: Zenith Press. ISBN 0-7603-2153-1.
- González, Miguel (25 May 1990). "España quiere modernizar sus carros de combate con los sobrantes en Centroeuropa". El País (in Spanish).
- González, Miguel (2 November 1990). "España negocia la adquisición de hasta 500 carros de combate que serán retirados de Centroeuropa". El País (in Spanish).
- González, Miguel (31 December 1990). "Defensa cifra en 1.500 millones el coste de los 532 tanques estadounidenses que recibirá a partir de 1992". El País (in Spanish).
- Jerchel, Michael; Uwe Schnellbacher (1998). Leopard 2 Main Battle Tank 1979–1998. Osprey Publishing. pp. 48. ISBN 1-85532-691-4.
- Kolodziej, Edward A. (1 June 1980). "France and the Arms Trade". International Affairs. 56 (1). Royal Institute of International Affairs: 54–72. doi:10.2307/2615719. JSTOR 2615719.
- Lathrop, Richard; John McDonald (2003). M60 Main Battle Tank 1960–91. Oxford, United Kingdom: Osprey Publishing. p. 48. ISBN 1-84176-551-1.
- Manrique, José María; Lucas Molina (2002). La Brunete: 1ª Parte (in Spanish). Valladolid, Spain: Quirón Ediciones. p. 80. ISBN 84-96016-27-7.
- Moncure, Lieutenant Colonel John (March–April 1997). "Leclerc: New French Tank, Like the M1A2, Uses Digital Architecture" (PDF). ARMOR magazine. Armor Center.
- Perez-Guerra, Jaime (1 April 1987). "Spanish AMX-30 MBT upgrade program". Jane's International Defence Review. Jane's.
- Simpkin, Richard E. (1979). Tank Warfare: An analysis of Soviet and NATO tank philosophy. London: Brassey's. p. 232. ISBN 978-0-904609-25-7.
- Yárnoz, Carlos (2 January 1989). "España eliminará decenas de carros de combate al concluir la negociación sobre desarme en Europa". El País (in Spanish).
- Yárnoz, Carlos (3 December 1987). "Fabricantes alemanes de armas critican el programa del futuro tanque español". El País (in Spanish).
- Yárnoz, Carlos (3 December 1987). "Francia propone a España la construcción conjunta de un nuevo carro de combate". El País (in Spanish).
- Yárnoz, Carlos (31 March 1986). "El Gobierno elegirá el mes próximo el carro de combate de los noventa". El País (in Spanish).
- Yárnoz, Carlos (30 December 1985). "Serra descarta a EE UU y Reino Unido para cofabricar los nuevos carros". El País (in Spanish).
- Yárnoz, Carlos (24 May 1984). "Técnicos españoles y alemanes han presentado el diseño del futuro carro de combate para el Ejército". El País (in Spanish).
- Zaloga, Steven (1999). The M47 and M48 Patton Tanks. Oxford, United Kingdom: Osprey Publishing. pp. 48. ISBN 1-85532-825-9.
