= Leopard 2E =

Spanish main battle tank

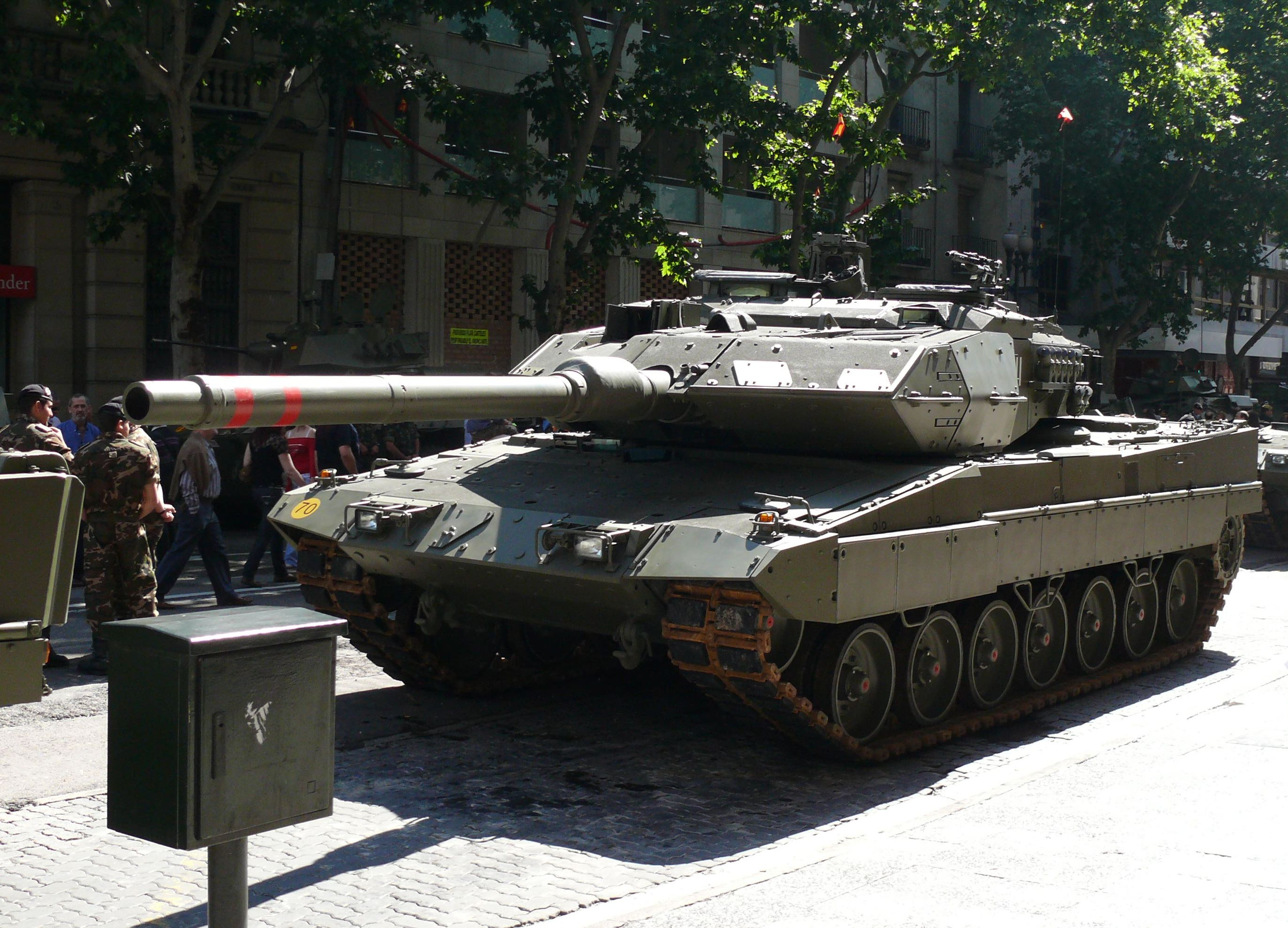
- Spanish Leopard 2E in Zaragoza, June 2008
- Type: Main battle tank
- Place of origin: Spain; Germany

Service history
- In service: December 2002–present
- Used by: Spain

Production history
- Designer: Krauss-Maffei Wegmann
- Manufacturer: General Dynamics Santa Bárbara Sistemas
- Unit cost: €10.95m including spares etc.
- Produced: 2001–2008
- No. built: 219

Specifications
- Mass: approx. 63 tonnes (69.4 short tons)
- Length: 7.7 m (25.3 ft)
- Width: 3.7 m (12.1 ft)
- Height: 3 m (9.8 ft)
- Crew: 4
- Armor: Composite armor
- Main armament: Rheinmetall 120 mm L/55
- Secondary armament: 2 × 7.62 mm MG3s
- Engine: MTU MB 873 Ka-501 12-cylinder diesel 1,500 PS (1,500 hp; 1,100 kW) at 2,600 rpm
- Power/weight: 23.8 PS/t (17.5 kW/t)
- Transmission: Renk HSWL 354
- Suspension: Torsion-bar
- Fuel capacity: 1,060 litres (280.02 US gal)
- Operational range: 500 km (310 mi)
- Maximum speed: 70 km/h (43 mph)

The Leopardo 2E or Leopard 2A6E (E stands for España (Spanish for 'Spain')) is a variant of the German Leopard 2 main battle tank (specifically the Leopard 2A6 variant), tailored to the requirements of the Spanish army, which acquired it as part of an armament modernization program named Programa Coraza, or Program Cuirass. The acquisition program for the Leopard 2E began in 1994, five years after the cancellation of the Lince tank program that culminated in an agreement to transfer 108 Leopard 2A4s to the Spanish army in 1998 and started the local production of the Leopard 2E in December 2002. Despite postponement of production owing to the 2003 merger between Santa Bárbara Sistemas and General Dynamics, and continued manufacturing issues between 2006 and 2007, 219 Leopard 2Es have been delivered to the Spanish army.

The Leopard 2E is superior to the M60 Patton tank, which it replaced in Spain's mechanized and armored units. Its development represented a total of 2.6 million man-hours' worth of work, 9,600 of them in Germany, at a total cost of €2.4 billion. This makes it one of the most expensive Leopard 2s built. Indigenous production amounted to 60% and the vehicles were assembled locally at Sevilla by Santa Bárbara Sistemas. It has thicker armor on the turret and glacis plate than the German Leopard 2A6, and uses a Spanish-designed tank command and control system, similar to the one fitted in German Leopard 2s. The Leopard 2E is expected to remain in service until 2025.

== Spanish armour programs 1987–1993 ==
By 1987, the Spanish army was equipped with 299 French-designed AMX-30Es, assembled by Santa Bárbara Sistemas, and 552 American M47 and M48 Patton tanks. The AMX-30Es were put into service in 1970, while the latter went into service in the mid-1950s. Although Spain's M47s and M48s were modernized to M47Es and M48Es, bringing them to near equivalence with the M60 Patton tank, the Spanish army considered them antiquated. In 1984, when deciding to replace its Patton tanks, the Spanish government declared its intention to produce a whole new main battle tank locally, since known as the Lince. Five companies expressed interest in bidding, including Krauss-Maffei in a partnership with Santa Bárbara Sistemas, GIAT with what became the Leclerc, General Dynamics with the M1 Abrams and Vickers with the Valiant. While the M1 Abrams and Valiant bids were not accepted, the bidding continued until 1989 when it was officially cancelled.

Instead, the Spanish government opted to replace its older Patton tanks with American M60 Patton tanks retired from Central Europe in accordance with the Treaty on Conventional Armed Forces in Europe. Although the Spanish army was originally to receive 532 M60 and M60A1 tanks, only 260 M60A3s were ultimately delivered, of which 244 were put into active service in the army. In the late 1980s the Spanish Ministry of Defense approved a modernization program for 150 of its AMX-30Es and a reconstruction program for the remaining 149 vehicles of this type, restoring them to their original condition. However, neither the M60s nor the AMX-30s were a considerable improvement over Spain's fleet of M47 and M48 Patton tanks.

Since the existing tank fleet did not meet the Spanish army's needs, Spain opened talks with Germany and Krauss-Maffei over the possibility of future collaboration in regards to Spain's future tank, and sent a military delegation to Germany in 1994. Although the Germans offered Spain surplus Leopard 1 tanks and Soviet equipment incorporated into the German army after the reunification of Germany, the Spanish government declined these offers and pressed for the Leopard 2.

== Programa Coraza ==
In March 1994, the Spanish Ministry of Defense created Programa Coraza 2000 (Program Breastplate 2000), which focused on the procurement and integration of new armament for the Spanish army's modernization. The program included the Leopard 2E and the Pizarro infantry combat vehicle, as well as the Eurocopter Tiger attack helicopter. The program's scope extended to the integration of 108 Leopard 2A4s, which were leased to Spain in late 1995. Apart from procurement, Programa Coraza was meant to prepare the Spanish army logistically for the introduction of new matériel.

=== Leopard 2A4 ===
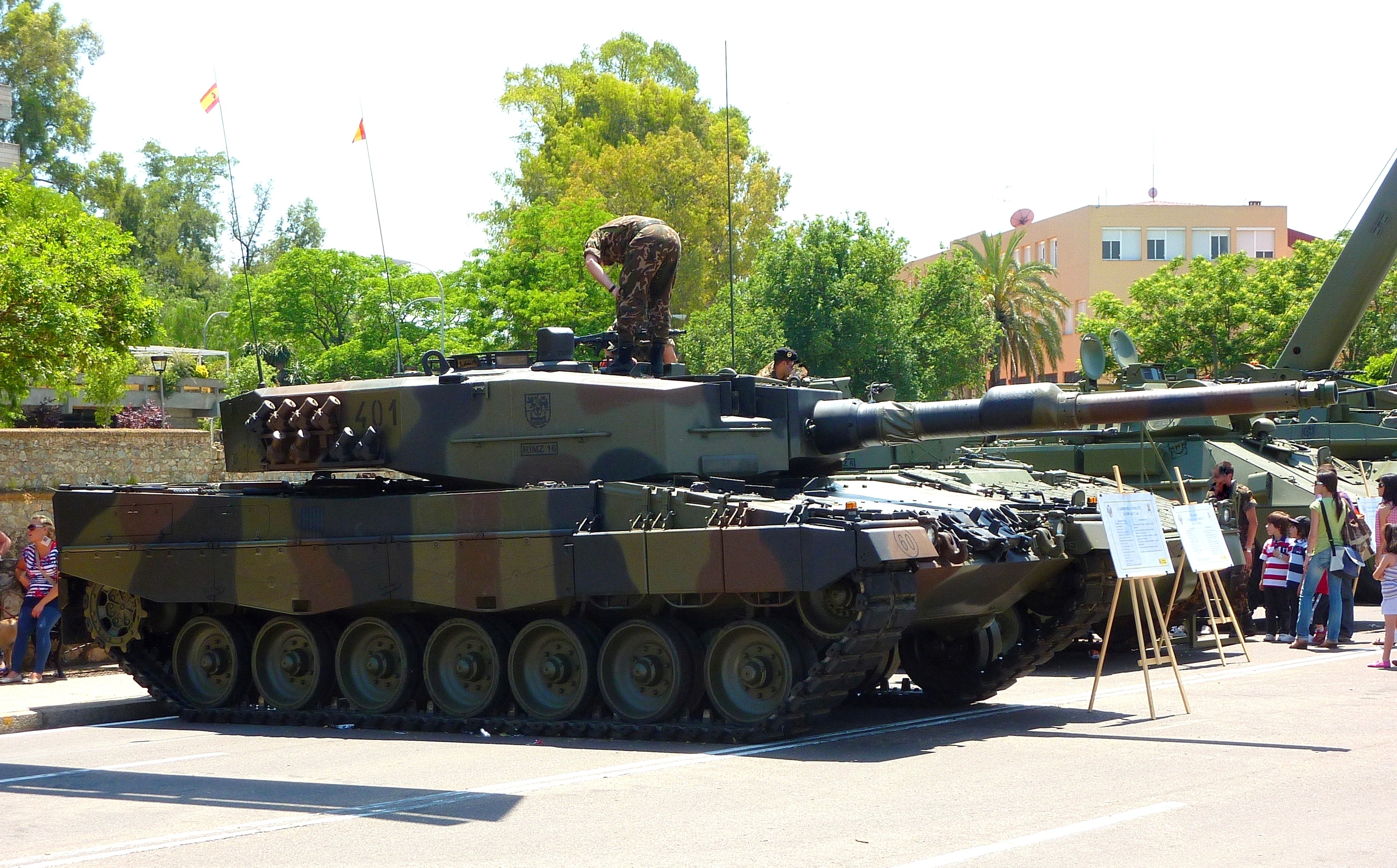
A Spanish Leopard 2A4 in 2010. Spain initially leased 108 Leopard 2A4s in 1995 from Germany. The lease was extended from 2001 to 2005. Later, Spain bought them for 15 million euros.

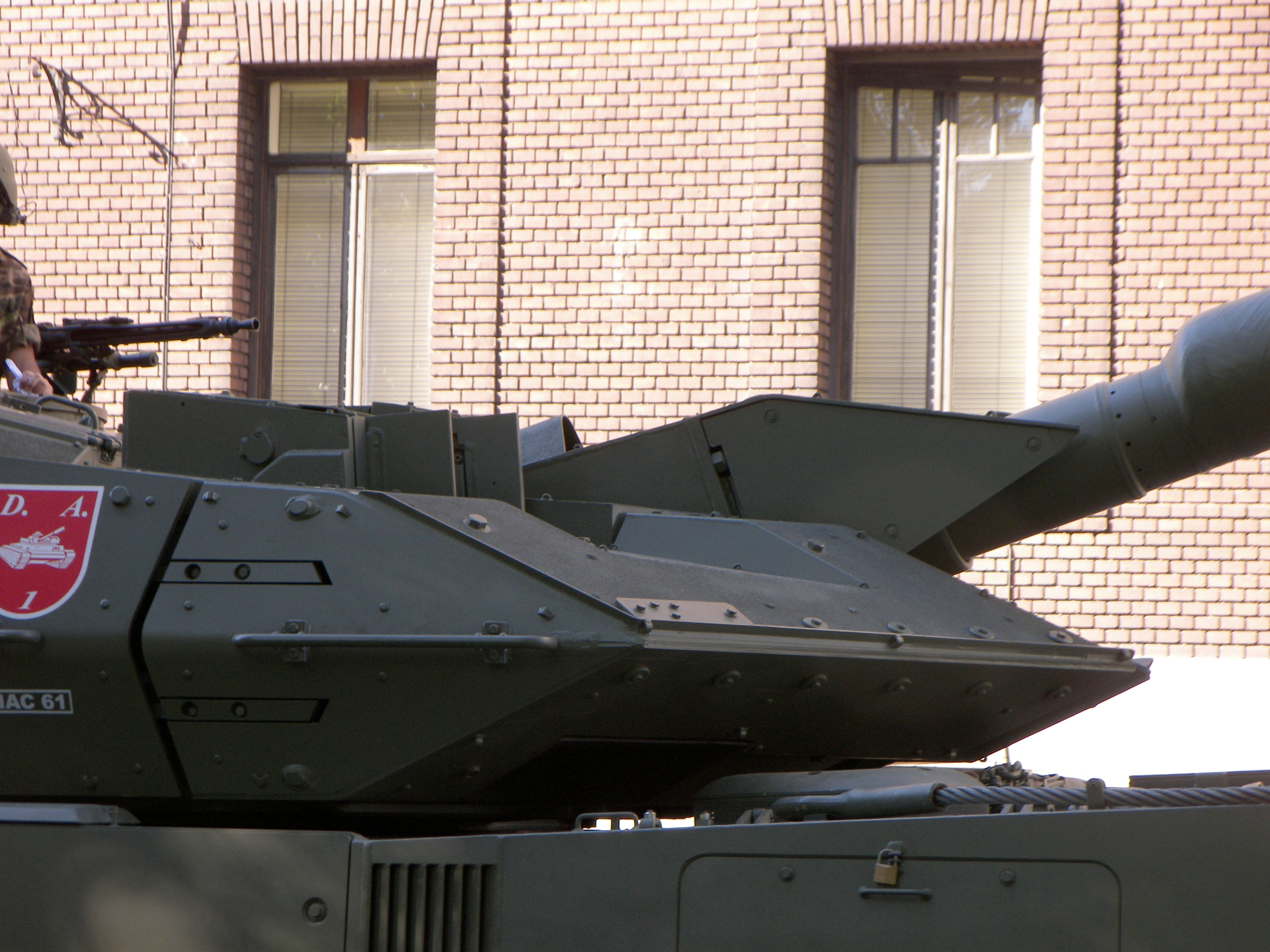
Close-up of the Leopard 2Es turret armor

A memorandum of understanding was signed on 9 June 1995 between the German and Spanish governments, setting the foundations for an acquisition of up to 308 brand-new Leopard 2Es. These were to be assembled in Spain by Santa Bárbara Sistemas, with 60–70 percent of the components manufactured by Spanish companies, and production taking place between 1998 and 2003. Furthermore, the German government agreed to lend the Spanish army 108 Leopard 2A4s for training purposes for a period of five years. These vehicles were delivered between November 1995 and June 1996. In 1998, Spain agreed to procure the ceded Leopard 2A4s and reduce production of the brand-new Leopard 2E to 219 vehicles. In 2005 it was declared that the 108 Leopard 2A4s were to cost Spain just €16.9m, to be paid by 2016.

The Leopard 2A4s equipped X and XI Mechanized Infantry Brigade, which at the time formed part of Eurocorps. As production of the Leopard 2E began and these units received Leopard 2Es, their Leopard 2A4s re-equipped the Alcántara Armored Cavalry Regiment, based in Melilla.

Spain's Leopard 2E is based on the Leopard 2A6, and incorporates the add-on wedge armor of the Leopard 2A5 on the turret. This armor maximizes the armor depth that a kinetic energy penetrator must travel through to enter the internal volume of the turret. Like the Swedish Leopard 2S (Strv 122), the Leopard 2E has increased armor thickness on the hull's glacis plate, the turret frontal arc and the turret roof, bringing the vehicle's weight close to 63 tonnes (69.4 tons). The vehicle's protection is augmented by the added armor that is built into the tank during the manufacturing process, as opposed to being added on after assembly as is the case for German Leopard 2A5s and 2A6s. As a consequence, the Leopard 2E is one of the best-protected Leopard 2s in service.

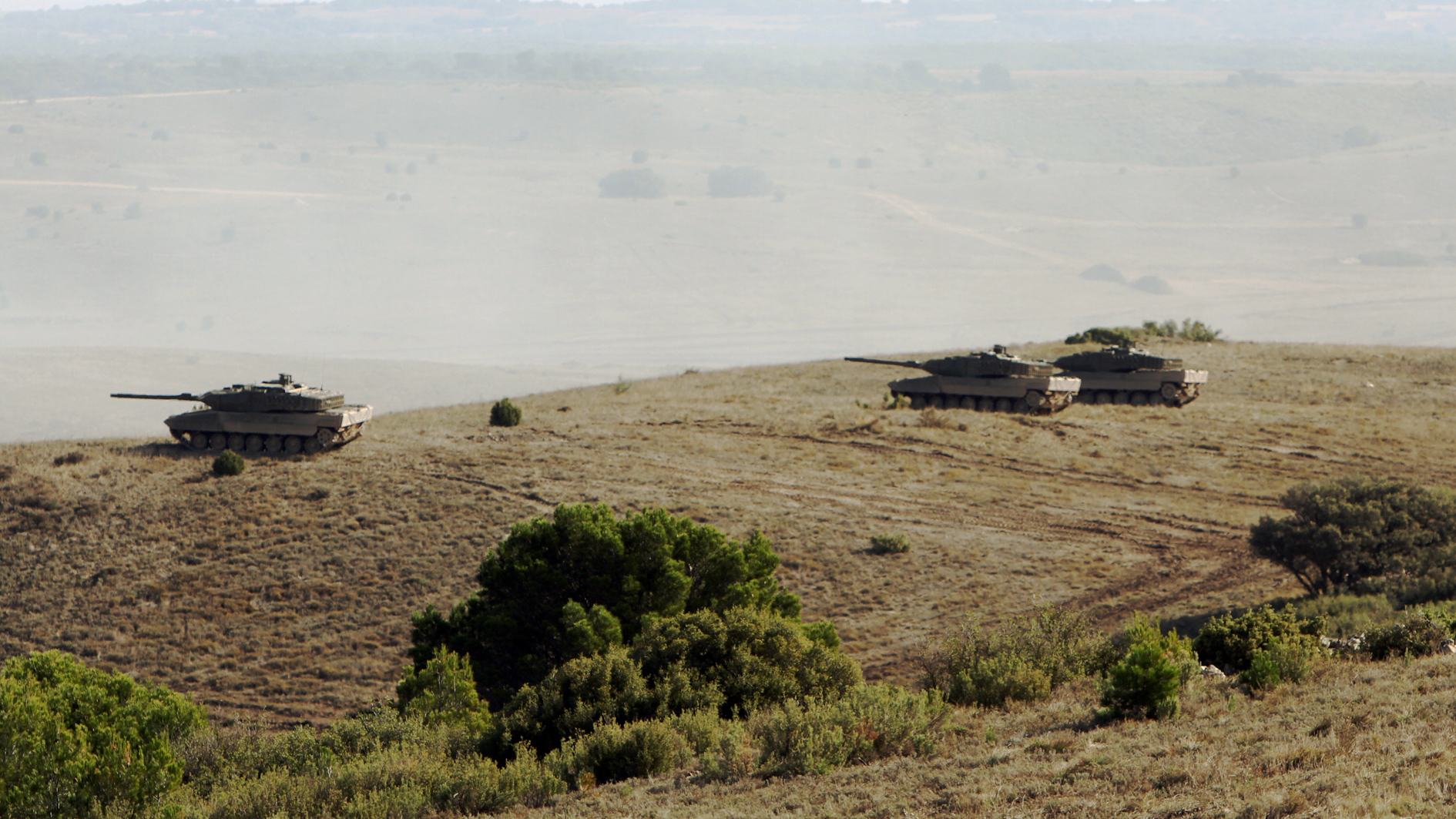
Spanish Leopard 2E tanks during NATO Exercise Trident Juncture 2015 DV Day (2015)

The tank is armed with Rheinmetall's 120-millimeter (4.7 in) L/55 tank-gun, and is capable of adopting a 140-millimeter (5.5 in) gun. Both the tank commander and gunner have identical second-generation thermal viewers, derived from those of the TOW 2B Light Launcher System. These are integrated into the tank by Indra and Rheinmetall Defense Electronics. Indra provides the tank's command and control system, called the Leopard Information and Command Equipment (LINCE), based on the Swedish and German Integrierte Führungssysteme (IFIS). Other differences between the Spanish Leopard 2E and other Leopard 2A6s include an auxiliary power unit, manufactured by SAPA, an air-conditioning system and new rubber pads for the vehicle's tracks to increase their lifespan on the irregular Spanish terrain. About 60% of each Leopard 2E was manufactured in Spain, as opposed to 30% for the Swedish Leopard 2s, for example.

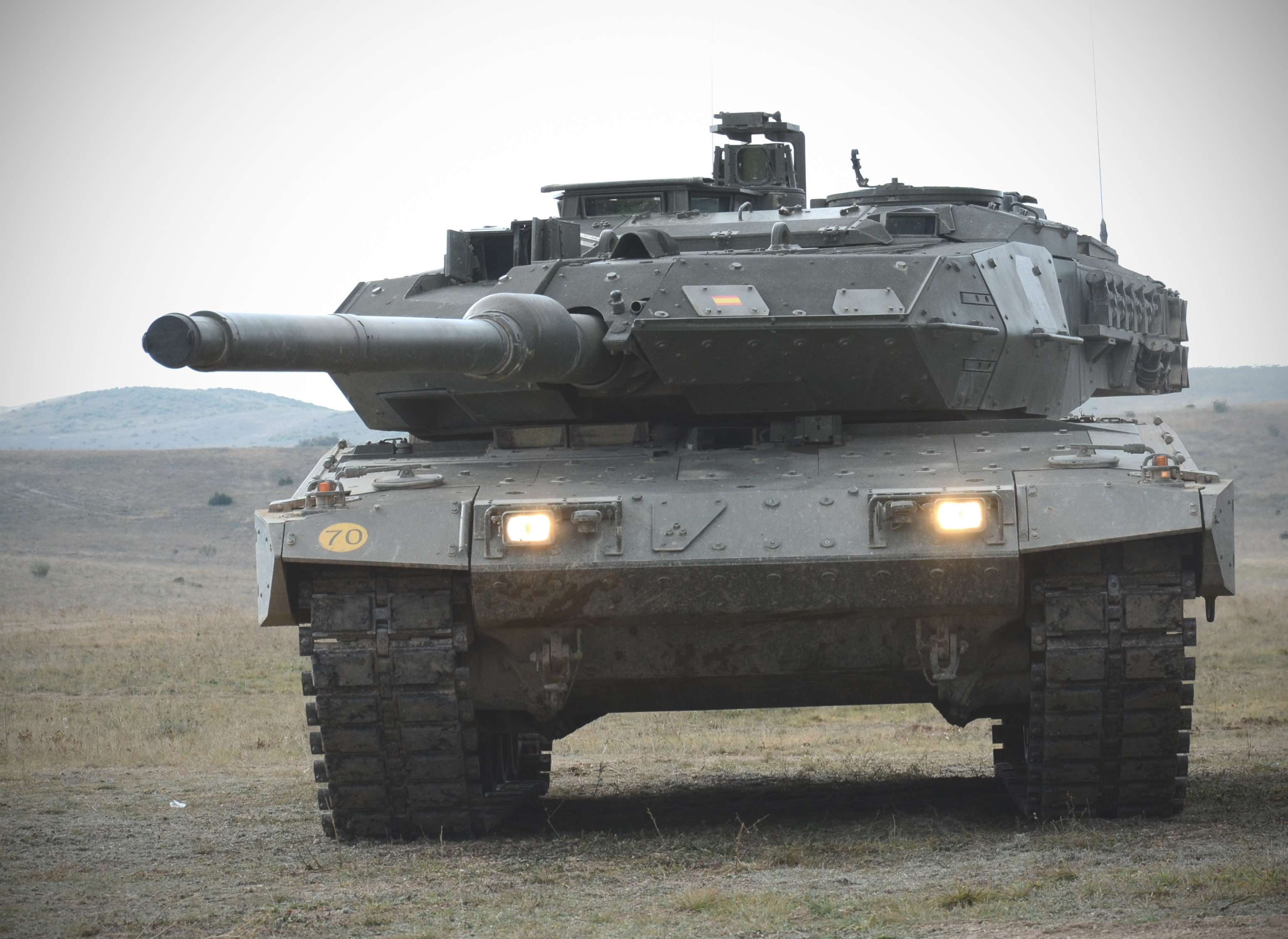
Front view of a Leopard 2E in 2015

Although the final contract for the production of Spanish Leopard 2Es was signed in 1998, calling for a production rate of four tanks per month, the first Leopard 2Es were not manufactured until late 2003. This was largely due to the merging of Santa Bárbara Sistemas with General Dynamics, and Krauss-Maffei's reservations regarding the sharing of the Leopard 2's technology with a rival company manufacturer of the M1 Abrams. Krauss-Maffei delivered 30 Leopard 2Es between 2003 and 2006. Production by Santa Bárbara Sistemas was delayed after assembly had begun; between January and November 2007, for example, only three of the 43 Leopard 2Es to be delivered to the Spanish army were actually delivered—with 15 more being delivered before the end of the year to make up for the earlier production problems. By 1 July 2006 the Spanish army had received 48 Leopard 2Es and nine Büffel armored recovery vehicles, which was only a quarter of those contracted. Production of the Leopard 2E was planned to end by 2007 but was extended into 2008.

The Leopard 2E replaced the Leopard 2A4 in Spanish mechanized units, which in turn replaced M60s in cavalry units. Both versions of the Leopard 2 are expected to remain in service with the Spanish army until 2025. In terms of industrial scale, the production and development of the Leopard 2E represents a total of 2.6 million man-hours of work, including 9,600 in Germany. It is one of the most expensive Leopard 2s built; the original contract was worth €1,910m but the final cost was €2,399m.

=== Comparison with other tanks in Spanish service ===
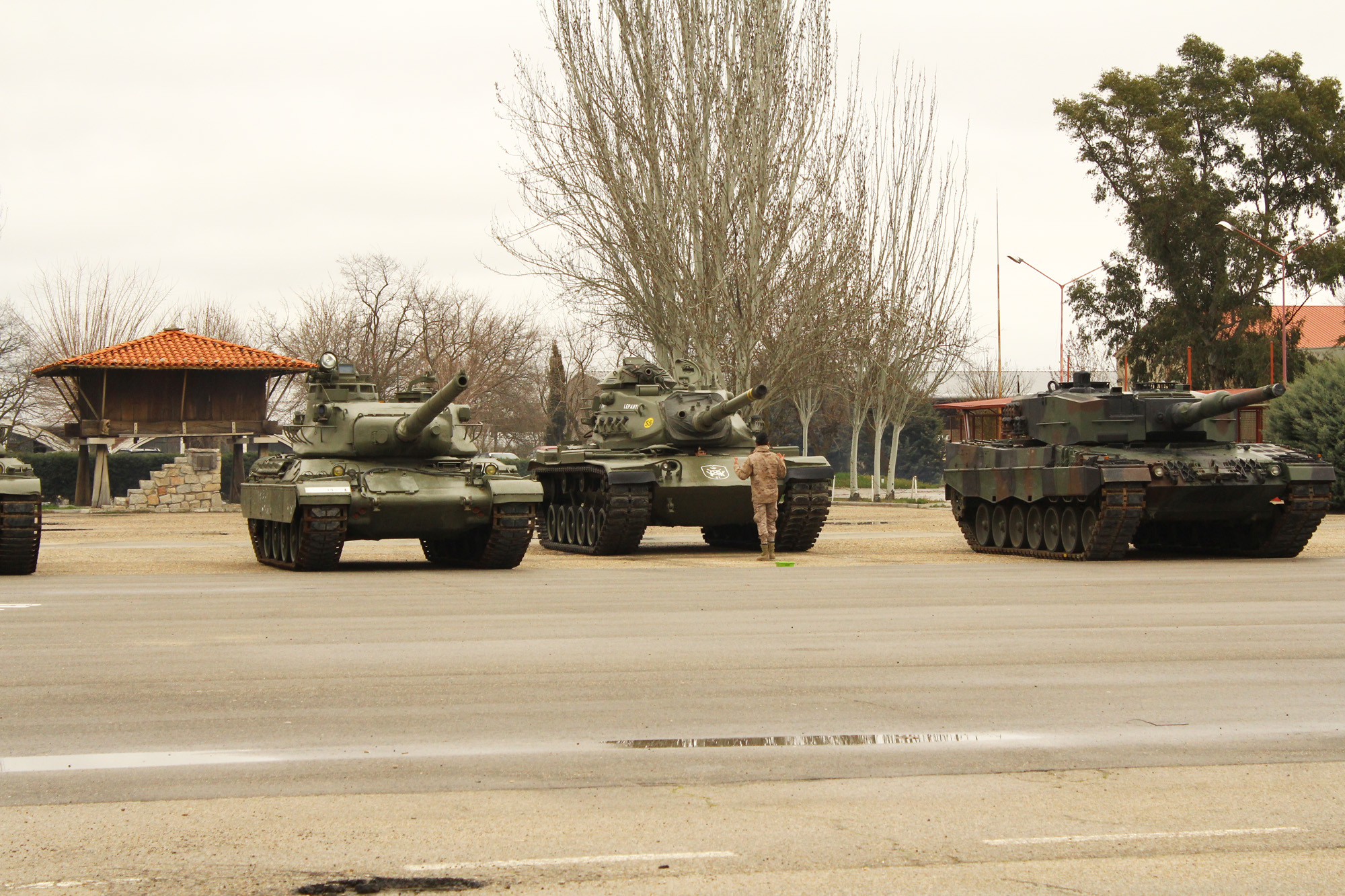
From left to right: an AMX-30E, a M60 Patton and a Leopard 2A4 in the Museum of Armored Units of El Goloso.

The Spanish army replaced its M60 Patton tanks and AMX-30s with the Leopard 2 between 1995 and 2008, a considerable improvement in capability. Previously, the Spanish army was equipped with M47 and M48 Patton tanks, which were upgraded to near M60 equivalency during the late 1970s and during the 1980s. Both the Leopard 2A4 and Leopard 2E sport a much more powerful gun than the AMX-30 and M60 tanks. The Leopard 2's 1,500 horsepower (1,100 kW) engine provides greater power than the M60A3's 750 hp (560 kW) and the AMX-30EM2's 850 hp (630 kW) engines. On the other hand, the Leopard 2 carries fewer, but larger, rounds than the M60A3.

	Leopard 2E	Leopard 2A4	M60A3	AMX-30EM2
Weight	63 t (69.45 tons)	55 t (60.63 tons)	55.6 t (61.1 tons)	36 t (39.68 tons)
Gun	120 mm L/55 smoothbore (4.72 in)	120 mm L/44 smoothbore (4.72 in)	105 mm M68 rifled tank-gun (4.13 in)	105 mm rifled (4.13 in)
Ammunition	42 rounds	42 rounds	63 rounds	Not available
Road range	500 km (310 mi)	500 km (310 mi)	480 km (300 mi)	400 km (250 mi)
Engine output	1,500 PS (1,500 hp; 1,100 kW)	1,500 PS (1,500 hp; 1,100 kW)	750 hp (560 kW)	850 hp (630 kW)
Maximum speed	70 km/h (43 mph)	68 km/h (42 mph)	48 km/h (30 mph)	64 km/h (40 mph)

== See also ==
- Tanks in the Spanish Army
- List of armoured fighting vehicles by country
- Stridsvagn 122
- Leopard 2PL
