= Santa Bárbara Sistemas =

Spanish defense contractor based in Madrid

- Trade name: GDELS - Santa Bárbara Sistemas
- Formerly: Empresa Nacional Santa Bárbara
- Type: Subsidiary
- Industry: Defense
- Predecessor: Instituto Nacional de Industria
- Founded: 1960; 66 years ago
- Headquarters: Madrid, Spain
- Area served: Worldwide
- Products: Armoured fighting vehicles; Artillery; Firearms; Ammunition; Explosives; Turrets
- Services: Military vehicle maintenance and modernization
- Parent: General Dynamics European Land Systems (General Dynamics)
- Website: www.gdels.com

Santa Bárbara Sistemas is a Spanish defense contractor based in Madrid, integrated under General Dynamics European Land Systems (GDELS), a business unit of General Dynamics which consolidated in one structure all European subsidiaries of GDLS.

It is one of the primary suppliers of the Military of Spain and is responsible for the assembly of heavy vehicles such as the Spanish Army's Leopard 2E main battle tank and the Pizarro infantry combat vehicle. The primary lines of business of Santa Bárbara Sistemas are armoured vehicles, special and amphibious vehicles, weapons systems, munitions and missiles, and Research & Development. The company is delivering the prototypes of the UK's Scout SV AFV through General Dynamics in the UK.

General Dynamics acquired the company from the Spanish government 25 July 2001.

== History ==
SBS was founded in 1960 by bringing together factories of the Spanish Ministry of Defense under the Instituto Nacional de Industria. These included arsenals in Sevilla, Oviedo, Trubia and A Coruna.

SBS was denationalised by Spain and acquired by General Dynamics Europe in July 2001.

In June 2024 SBS announced the reactivation of its artillery gun barrel manufacturing capacity at Trubia.

== Products and programmes ==
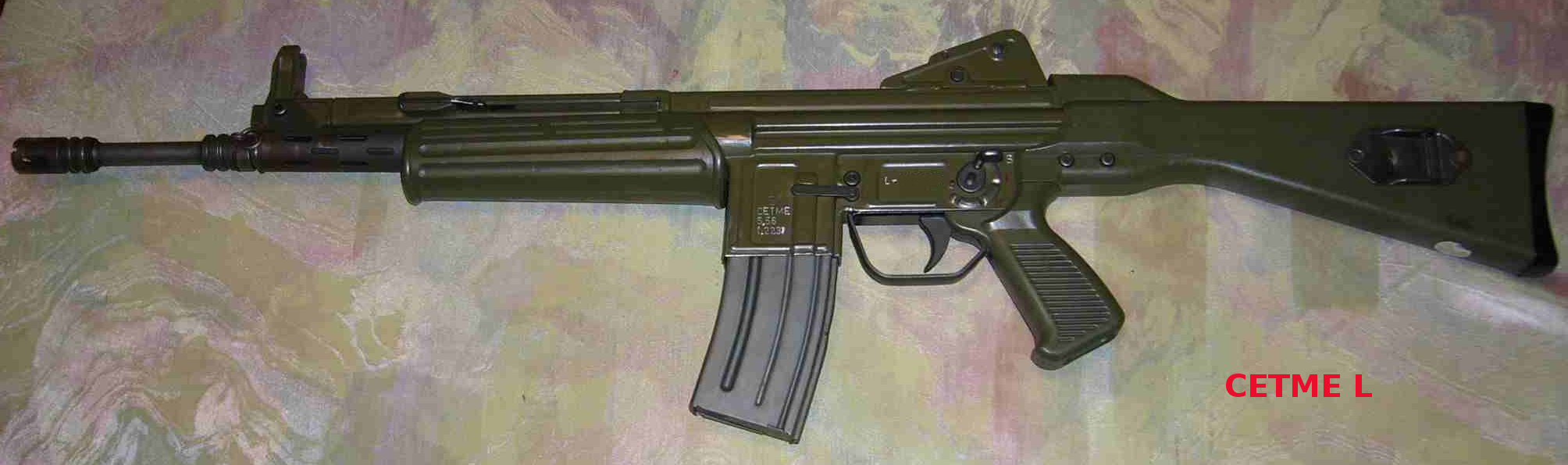
CETME L Assault rifle

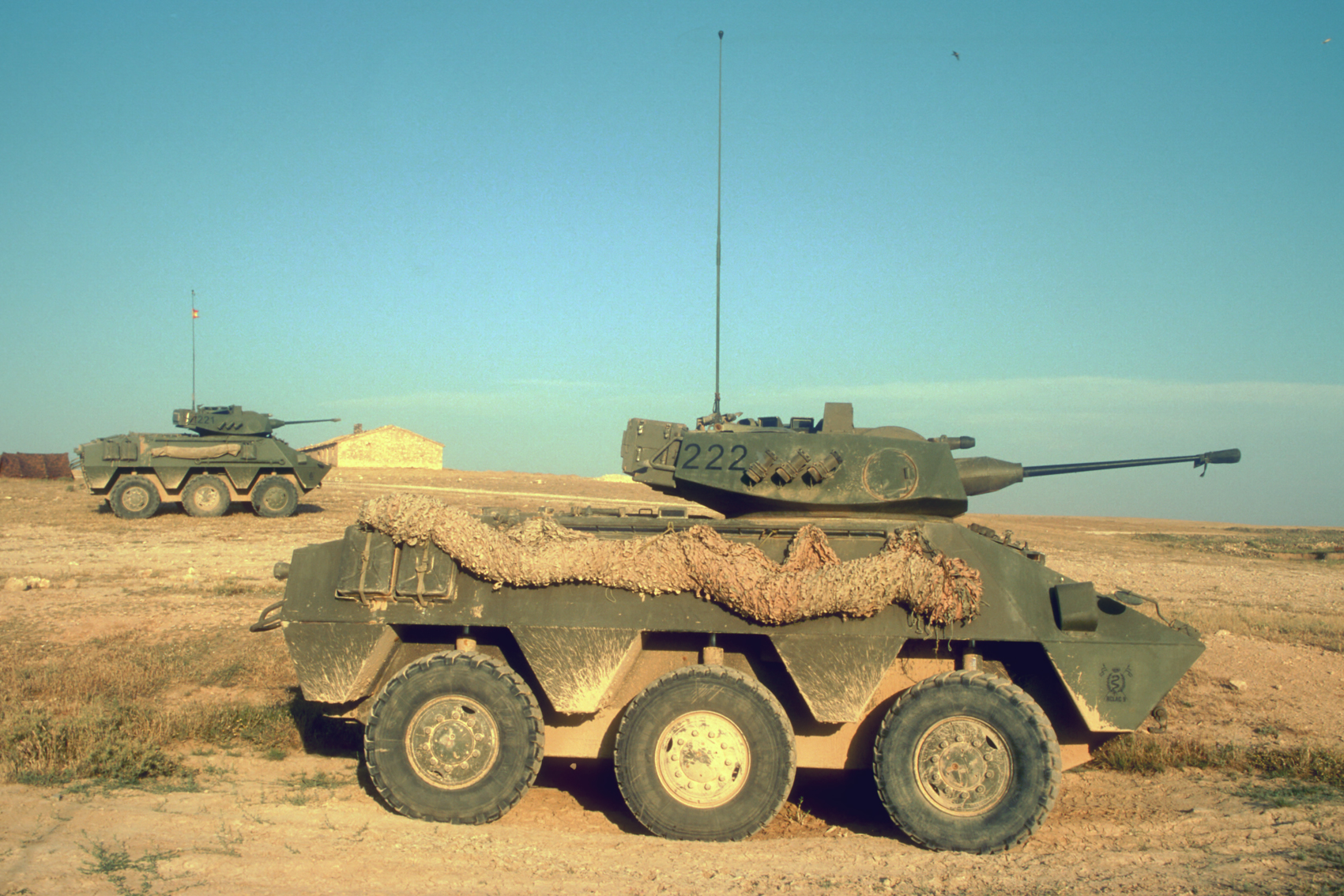
VEC-M1

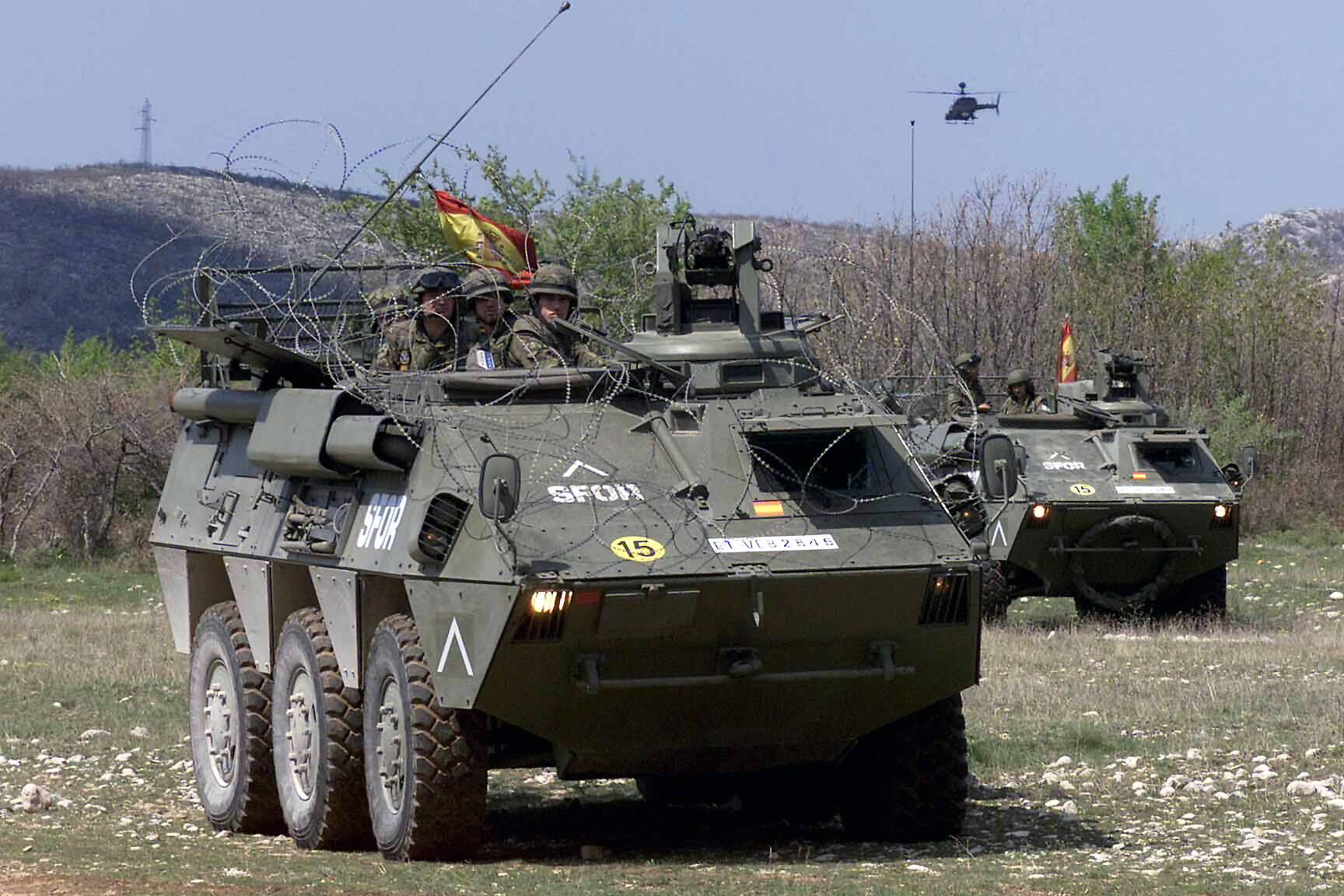
BMR

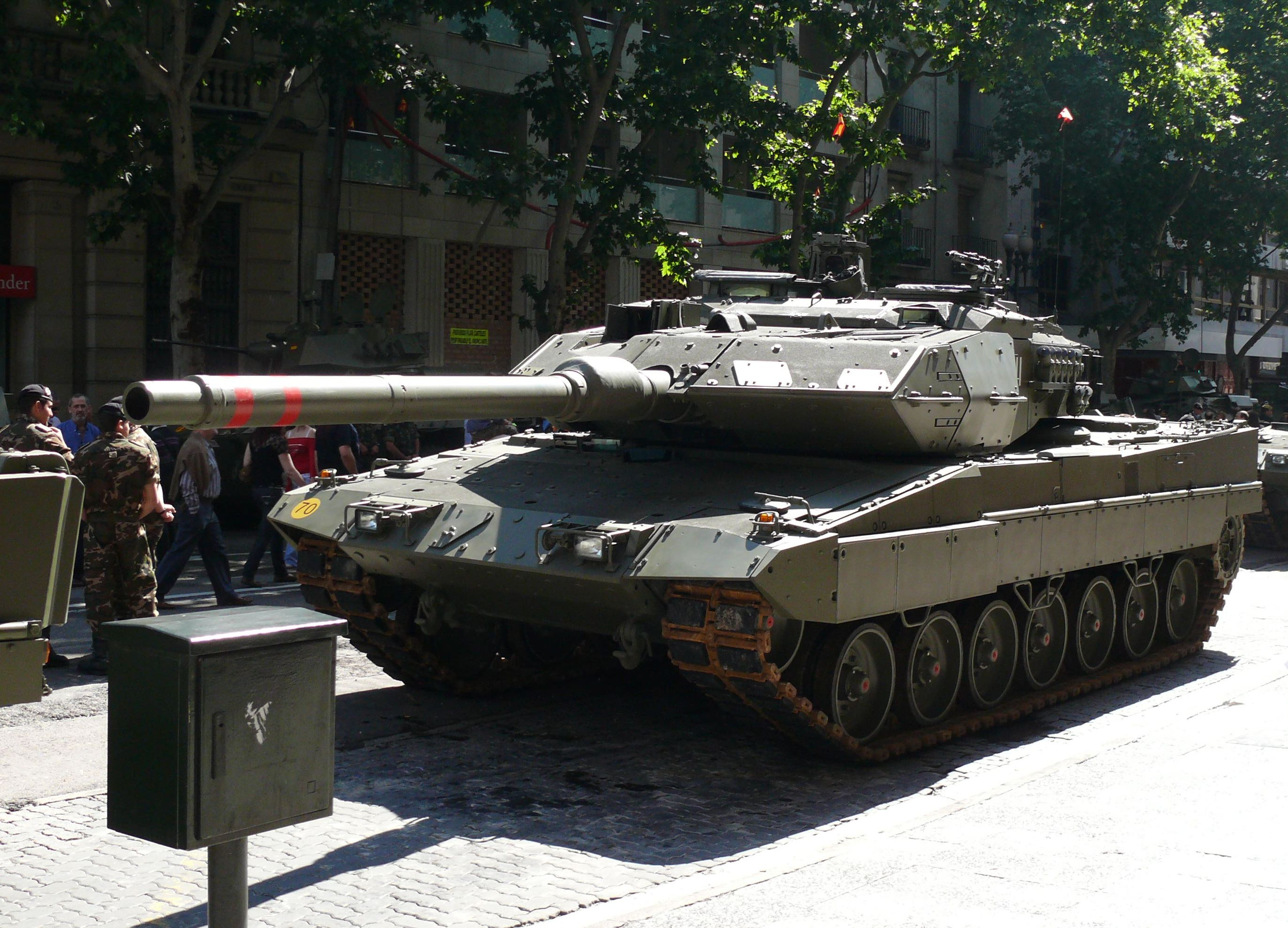
Leopard 2E Tank

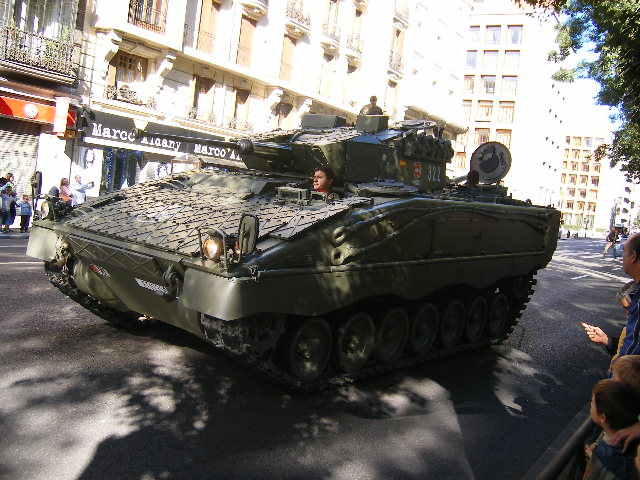
ASCOD / Pizarro Infantry fighting vehicle

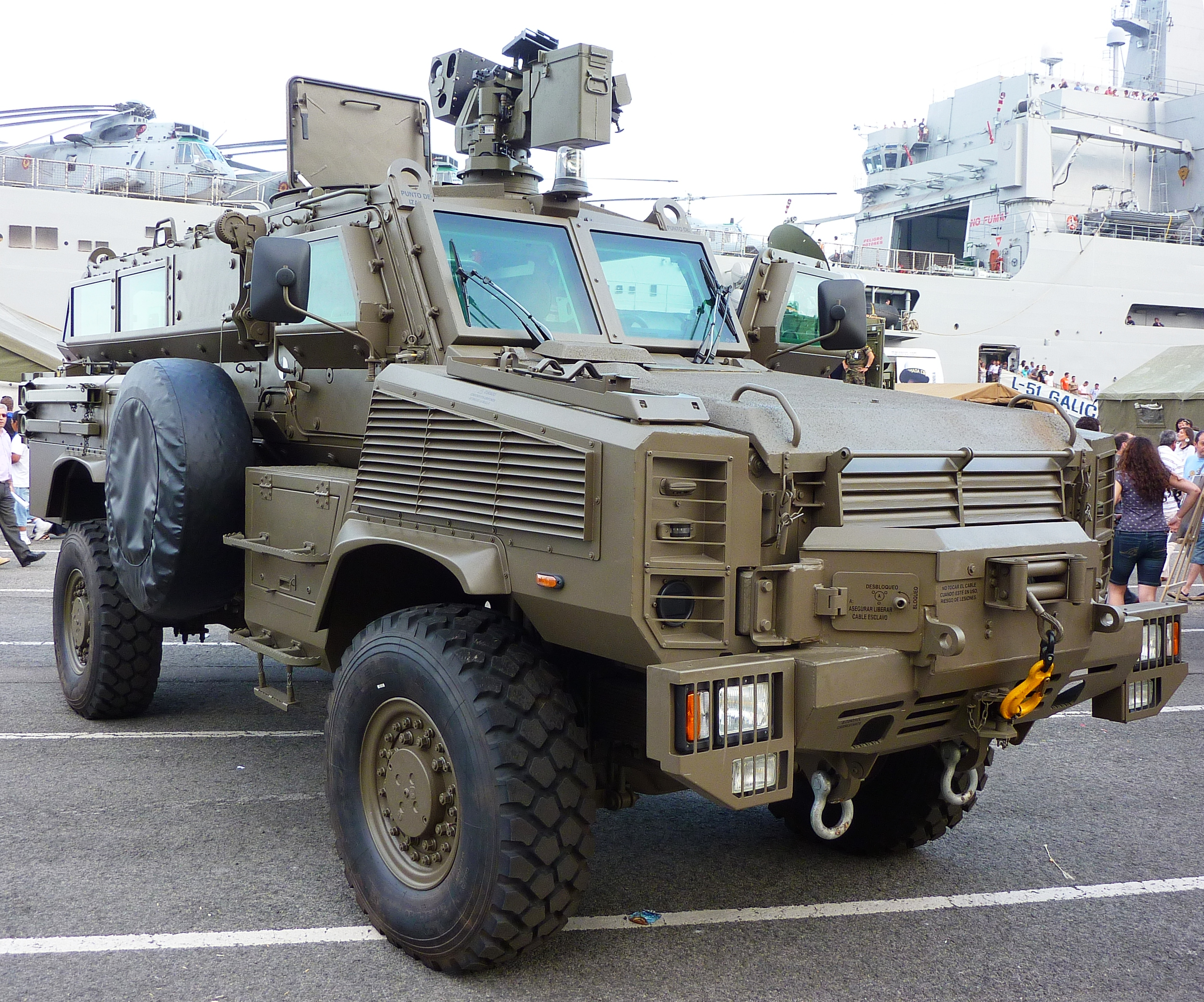
Rg-31 of the Spanish Army

=== Weapons and systems ===
- Firearms:
  - CETME - Assault rifle
  - CETME Ameli - Light machine gun
  - CETME L - Assault rifle
  - LAG 40 - Automatic grenade launcher
- Artillery:
  - Santa Bárbara Sistemas 155/52 SIAC
- Gun turrets:
  - TC-25 - Turret
  - TC-13 - Turret
  - TC-3 - Turret
  - TC-7 - Turret
  - TC-19 - Turret
  - TC-9 - Turret

=== Munitions and powders ===
- Powders
  - Pólvora Dx
  - Pólvora Esferoidal
- Munitions
  - Artillery
  - Small Caliber
  - Medium Caliber
  - Tank ammunitions
- Explosives
  - Cutting and perforating explosives

=== Armoured vehicles ===
- Tracked Vehicles
  - Pizarro - Infantry fighting vehicle
  - Scout SV
- Wheeled Vehicles
  - BMR- Vehículo blindado medio de ruedas
  - VCR Dragón - Vehículo blindado medio sobre ruedas
  - VEC- Vehículo blindado de exploración de caballería

=== Cooperative programs ===
- Armoured vehicles
  - Leopardo 2E - Tank
  - RG-31 Mk5E, local assembly of the units bought by the Spanish Army.
  - AMX-30E - Tank
- Weapons and systems
  - G36E - Assault rifle
  - Mauser Mk30 - Automatic cannon
  - MG3 - General purpose machine gun
  - Heckler & Koch MG4 - Light machine gun
- Missiles
  - Warhead and other system components
  - Meteor program
  - Anti-tank Missile Spike: Partial manufacture and assembly line of the missiles acquired by the Spanish Army and the Spanish Marines, under the license of Rafael Advanced Defense Systems Ltd.
- Civilian Sector
  - Aeronautics
  - Thermal and surface components

=== Modernisation programs ===
- Tanks
  - AMX-30E
  - M60 Patton
- Armoured vehicles
  - BMR 2
