= Scorpius Holdings =

US biotech company

Scorpius Holdings, Inc.
- Formerly: Heat Biologics Inc.; Nighthawk Biosciences
- Type: Public
- Traded as: Nasdaq: SCPX
- Industry: Biotechnology
- Founded: 2008; 18 years ago
- Headquarters: Morrisville, North Carolina, U.S.
- Area served: Morrisville, North Carolina, New Brunswick, New Jersey, and San Antonio, Texas, U.S.
- Key people: Jeffrey Wolf (Founder and CEO)
- Products: HS-110, HS-130, PTX-35 and COVID-19 program
- Website: ir.scorpiusbiologics.com

Scorpius Holdings, Inc. (formerly known as Heat Biologics Inc. and Nighthawk Bioscienses) is a U.S. contract development and manufacturing company. Heat Biologics was founded by Jeff Wolf and Eckhard Podack, in conjunction with the University of Miami and Seed-One Ventures. The company is based in Morrisville, North Carolina.

== History ==
In 2008, Heat Biologics was founded by Jeff Wolf and Eckhard Podack, in conjunction with the University of Miami and Seed-One Ventures. The company relocated to North Carolina in 2011. NCBiotech provided $225,000 of initial funding the same year.

On July 24, 2013, Heat Biologics stock went public on NASDAQ under ticker symbol HTBX.

In 2017, Heat Biologics acquired an 80% controlling interest in Pelican Therapeutics.

In 2019, the company moved its headquarters to Morrisville, North Carolina.

In 2020, the Miller School of Medicine at the University of Miami collaborated with Heat Biologics to develop a COVID-19 vaccine using gp-96 to express antigens associated with COVID-19.

In 2021, Heat Biologics began Phase 2 clinical trials for a new non-small cell lung cancer treatment (HS-110). It also initiated a Phase 1 trial for HS-130, its off-the-shelf cell line engineered to stimulate T-cells to assist in immune response to disease.

The company changed its name to NightHawk Biosciences in 2022.In 2024, the company restructured, dropping its R&D efforts and shifting to a contract development and manufacturing organization.In December 2025, the company's manufacturing and development assets were sold to Tivic Health Systems.

== Pipeline products ==
=== HS-110 ===
HS-110, also called viagenpumatucel-L, is in Phase II in NSCLC, in combination with cyclophosphamide. Another Phase I study is combining HS 110 with nivolumab and other checkpoint inhibitors.Development on HS-110 was halted in November 2022.

=== HS-130 ===
HS-130 is in Phase I clinical trial for patients with solid tumors. HS-130 is an allogeneic (“off-the-shelf”) cell line engineered to express OX40 ligand fusion protein (OX40L-Fc). OX40 ligand is a key co-stimulator of T cells that augments antigen-specific CD8+ T cell responses.

=== COVID-19 Vaccine ===
The company initiated a COVID-19 vaccine collaboration with the University of Miami in March 2020 using their gp96 platform which activates the human immune system to combat infectious diseases with the potential of generating long-term immune responses.

=== PTX-35 ===
PTX-35 was in Phase I clinical trial for patients with solid tumors. PTX-35 was a potential first-in-class T cell co-stimulator targeting TNFRSF25 (Death Receptor 3). Favorable safety profile was demonstrated in mice and non-human primates. PTX-35's development plan focused on cancer immunotherapy.Development on PTX-35 was halted in November 2022.
