= Lehr =

Lehr may refer to:

- Lehr (glassmaking), a kiln for annealing glass
- Lehr (surname)
- Lehr, North Dakota, U.S.
- Lehr Infantry Battalion of the Prussian and Imperial German Armies, 1819–1914
- Lehr Infantry Regiment of the German Army in World War I
- Lehr-Brigade (mot.) 900, a German Army brigade during World War II
- Panzer Lehr Division, a German armored division during World War II
- Lehr, a district of Ulm, Germany

== See also ==
- Lahr (disambiguation)
- Lehrer, a surname
- Lehrs, a surname
- Lerner (disambiguation)
