= Yechiel =

Wikimedia disambiguation page

- Gender: Male

Origin
- Origin: Hebrew
- Meaning: May God live

Other names
- Related names: Jehiel יְחִיאֵל (Yekhiyyel/Yeħiyyêl) (Hebrew)

Yechiel (Hebrew: יְחִיאֵל) is a Hebrew masculine given name meaning "May God live" or "God shall live". Alternative spellings of Yechiel include Jehiel, Yehiel, Yechi'el, and Yiddish variants include Ichel, Ychel, Echiel, Cheil, and Chil.

Several people in the Hebrew Bible have this name.

The name may also refer to:

== People ==
- Yehiel Bar (born 1975), Israeli politician
- Jehiel Brooks (1797–1886), American soldier and politician
- Yehiel De-Nur (1909–2001), Israeli writer
- Yehiel Dresner (1922–1947), Israeli paramilitary fighter
- Yechiel Eckstein (1951–2019), American rabbi
- Yechiel Fishel Eisenbach (1925–2008), Israeli rabbi
- Jehiel R. Elyachar (1898–1989), American engineer
- Yechiel Michel Epstein (1829–1908), Lithuanian rabbi
- Yechiel Granatstein (1913–2008), Polish-born Jewish author and writer
- Yehiel Lasri (born 1957), Israeli politician and mayor
- Yechiel Leiter (born 1959), Israeli political scientist and civic leader
- Yechiel Lerer (1910–1943), Polish poet
- Yehiel Rabinowitz (born 1939), French artist
- Yechiel Shemi (1922–2003), Israeli sculptor
- Yehiel Tzagai (born 1983), Israeli football player
