= Leyrer =

Leyrer is a surname. Notable people with the surname include:

- Edith Leyrer (born 1946), Austrian actress
- Marcus Leyrer (1929–2017), Austrian fencer

== See also ==
- Lehrer
- Lerer
