= Granatstein =

Granatstein is a surname. Notable people with the surname include:

- Jack Granatstein (born 1939), Canadian historian
- Solly Granatstein (fl. 1990–2019), American television producer and director
- Yechiel Granatstein (1913–2008), Polish-born Jewish author
