= Lehr (surname) =

Lehr is a surname. Notable people with the surname include:

- Anna Lehr, American silent film actress
- Clarence Lehr (1886–1948), American baseball player
- Devon Lehr, American television writer and screenwriter
- George W. Lehr (1937–1988), American politician from Missouri
- Henry Solomon Lehr (1838–1923), American educator, founder of Ohio Northern University
- Henry Symes Lehr (1869–1929), American socialite
- Jane Lehr, American electrical engineer
- John Lehr (born 1967), American actor
- John Lehr (photographer) (born 1975), American photographer
- John C. Lehr (1878–1958), American politician, U.S. Representative from Michigan
- Justin Lehr (born 1977), American baseball pitcher
- Lew Lehr (1895–1950) American comedian, writer and editor
- Marguerite Lehr (1898–1987), American mathematician
- Matt Lehr (born 1979), American football player
- Robert Lehr (1883–1956), German politician
- Stanford Lehr (1912–1992), American politician, member of the Pennsylvania House of Representatives
- Ursula Lehr (1930–2022), German gerolontogist and politician
- Zella Lehr, American singer and entertainer
- Dylan Lehr, American rapper and songwriter
