= Lehrs =

Lehrs is a surname of German origin. It may refer to the following people:

- Ernst Lehrs (1894–1979), German anthroposophist
- Karl Lehrs (1802–1878), German classicist
- Max Lehrs (1855–1938), German art historian
- Philipp Lehrs (1881–1956), German herpetologist

== See also ==
- Lehr (disambiguation)
- Lehrer
