= Sd.Kfz. 265 Panzerbefehlswagen =

German armored command vehicle

Panzerbefehlswagen
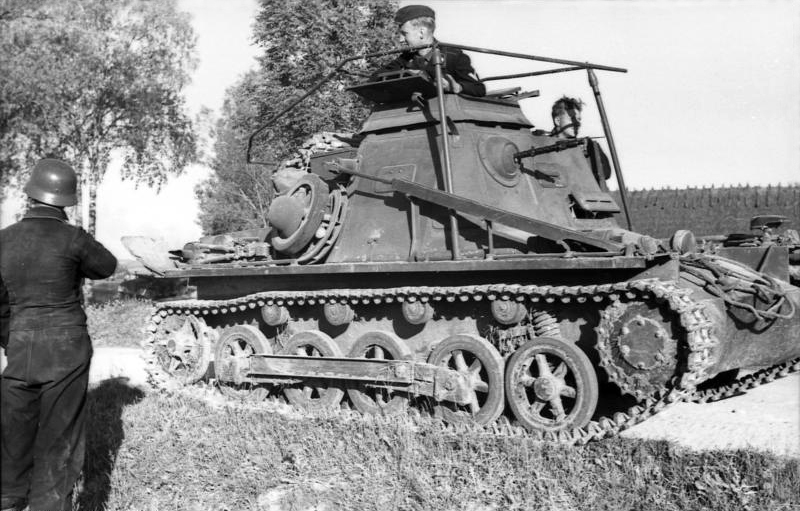
- Panzerbefehlswagen on Panzer I Ausf. B chassis
- Type: Light tank
- Place of origin: Nazi Germany

Service history
- In service: 1939–1945
- Used by: Nazi Germany; Kingdom of Hungary
- Wars: Second World War

Production history
- Designed: 1938
- Manufacturer: Krupp, Daimler-Benz
- Produced: 1938–1939
- No. built: 190

Specifications
- Mass: 5.8 tonnes (6.4 short tons; 5.7 long tons)
- Length: 4.445 m (14 ft 7.0 in)
- Width: 2.08 m (6 ft 10 in)
- Height: 1.72 m (5 ft 8 in)
- Crew: 3; Commander, Driver and Radio Operator
- Armor: 6 to 13 mm (0.24 to 0.51 in)
- Main armament: One 7.92 mm MG13 machine gun
- Engine: Maybach NL38TR inline six-cylinder water cooled gasoline engine. 100 metric horsepower (74 kW)
- Suspension: Quarter-elliptical leaf spring suspension.
- Operational range: 290 km (180 mi)
- Maximum speed: 40 km/h (25 mph) on-road

The kleiner Panzerbefehlswagen (English: light armoured command vehicle), known also by its ordnance inventory designation Sd.Kfz. 265, was the German Army's first purpose-designed armoured command vehicle; a type of armoured fighting vehicle designed to provide a tank unit commander with mobility and communications on the battlefield. A development of the Army's first mass-produced tank, the Panzer I Ausf. A, the Sd.Kfz. 265 saw considerable action during the early years of the war, serving in Panzer units through 1942 and with other formations until late in the war.

The kleiner Panzerbefehlswagen, is commonly referred to as a command tank, but as it is without a turret or offensive armament and merely is built on the chassis of the Panzer I light tank, it does not retain the capabilities or role of a tank. Instead, it functions more along the line of an armoured personnel carrier in conveying the unit commander and his radio operator under armour about the battlefield.

== History ==
The Sd.Kfz. 265 was designed to fulfill a growing need within the German Army for a command tank, following the realization that the leaders of a massive panzer formation would themselves have to travel in a tank of some type. This vehicle would have to carry extra equipment and personnel to assist the field commander in his duties. The Panzer I Ausf A then in service lacked a transmitter, and thus was unsuitable for commanders as they would have to leave the tank and rely on more vulnerable vehicles to carry a transmitter in order to be able to issue orders to their formation.

Wishing to retain the Panzer I's armour and mobility, it was decided to modify the Panzer I Ausf. A to do the job. Not entirely satisfactory, significant chassis redesign was required, though this ultimately provided the basis for improvements in the combat tank line as well.

== Design ==
To increase space for a unit commander, radio operator, and a FuG 6 radio transmitter with associated gear, the rotating turret and main armament of the Panzer I combat tank was removed. A tall, fixed superstructure was installed which contained space for the commander and radio operator to work, and a single ball-mounted machine gun was mounted in the front armour of this to give the tank a measure of defensive firepower. Fittings in the vehicle provided for carriage of 900 rounds of ammunition for the machine gun, which was either an MG 34 or older MG 13 in some examples, though in the field it was common for the gun and ammunition storage to be removed to allow for additional internal space. While room existed within this structure for map boards, paperwork and other kit required for operational command and radio operation, the vehicle's interior remained small, a factor leading to its rapid replacement by conversions of larger tanks.

Six such conversions were made but meanwhile a new chassis was developed with offered more space for the modifications, and all production vehicles were made on this larger base. In addition to more space, the original tank's 60 hp 4-cylinder air-cooled Krupp M305 engine was replaced by a 100 hp 6-cylinder liquid-cooled Maybach NL38TR to power not only the vehicle, but the newly installed equipment. The new chassis was more satisfactory and would go on to form the basis for the second mass-produced Panzer I, the Ausf. B.
