= Lehrer =

Lehrer, alternatively Lehr, Lehrian or Lehrmann, is a surname that can be either Germanic or Jewish.

== Origin ==
=== Teacher ===
The most probable option for the origin of the Lehrer surname is from the word Lehrer, meaning teacher or rabbi in the German language. This may be religious or it may describe a teacher at any traditional secular school but also a tutor or an instructor.

=== Locational ===
The origin may be topographical and derive from the ancient pre-7th-century word lehr akin to the English 'leah', and as such describing an enclosure suitable for agriculture or a water meadow, one which was flooded in winter but dried out for summer grazing. There are several places in Southern Germany and Austria called 'Lehr'. These place names might have derived from water meadows.

=== Jewish Lehrers ===
There is a well documented family that trace their lineage to a Jewish teacher in Poland. While possible, it appears very unlikely that the southern German and the Jewish family lines are connected.

The possible link from the Rhineland Lehrers to the Polish line relates to emigration from France and southern Germany. There was no systematic, official method of emigration, and few emigration lists are available, yet significant numbers of emigrants were known to leave southern Germany and Alsace during the following periods:

- 1618 to 1648 and immediately after: The Thirty Years' War created large movements in and around what is today southern Germany.
- 1650 to 1750: Large numbers depart central Europe for the new opportunities in America
- 1722: Alsatian colonies established in the Holy Roman Empire (Austria-Hungary).
- 1764 to 1786: Alsatians colonise Russia, Ukraine, and Banat.
- 1789 to 1791: About 500,000 refugees flee the French Revolution for neighbouring nations and the Americas. About half later returned.
- 1804 to 1832: Additional Alsatians emigrate to Ukraine, Bessarabia, and Banat.

The registres d'options de noms 1808 became a de facto census of the Jewish people of France. According to a list in the Archives Nationales, there were 46,054 Jewish people in France who chose permanent names. The majority were in the departments of Bas-Rhin, Haut-Rhin, and Moselle, areas that some Lehrer families lived in. In each, the head of a family, usually the husband and father, gives for each family member his or her name, date and place of birth, and the surname and forenames chosen.

=== Germanic Lehrers ===
There are a number of Lehrer families originating in southern Germany, north, west France, Austria and Bavaria, although unlikely some of these different lineages may all originate from the one family. By following the birth places of the people furthest back in the known Lehrer family lines, as we move further back in time, there is a consistent movement into the Rhineland, in particular to two nearby cities either side of the Rhine, Landau and Strasbourg.

The earliest known record of births and marriages for Lehrer families are the children of Georg Lehrer and his wife Sibilla who lived in Bayern, Germany. They had three known children who were baptised in Evangelisch, Landau in Pfalz Stadt, Pfalz, Bavaria:

- Christianus Lehrer – baptised 18 August 1577
- Maria Lehrer – 2 June 1581
- Margaretha Lehrer – 24 May 1584

Commercial heraldry websites indicate that there is a Lehrer family crest, although they promote other surnames of a similar spelling as having the same family crest. If there is a Lehrer crest, likely recordings of who this was issued to and where they were from would be in German Bavaria or Württemberg as during the late 1500s and the early part of the 1600s, almost all recorded Lehrer, birth, death and marriages appear to be in this region.

In the late 1600s and early 1700s, the recorded births, deaths and marriages spread out through the Rhineland and include Alsace which was partially independent and is now a part of France, Austria, Wurrtemburg and other parts of Germany. By the late 1700s and early 1800s, a significant number of Lehrers moved elsewhere around the world, specifically to the Americas.

== Notable people with the surname ==
- Andy Lehrer (1930–2014), Romanian entomologist
- Brian Lehrer (born 1952), American talk show host
- Erica Lehrer, American anthropologist, curator, and academic
- Gustav Lehrer (born 1947), Australian mathematician and researcher
- Harry Lehrer (1904–1972), American pharmacist, physician, and real estate speculator
- Heidi Lehrer (born 1966), a sprint canoer from Antigua and Barbuda
- Jacob Lehrer (born 1964), a sprint canoer from Antigua and Barbuda
- Jim Lehrer (1934–2020), American journalist, television news anchor, and author
- Jonah Lehrer (born 1981), American author and blogger
- Josh Lehrer, a commercial and fine-art photographer
- Kate Lehrer (born 1939), American writer and book reviewer
- Keith Lehrer (born 1936), American philosopher
- Leibush Lehrer (1887–1964), American Yiddish pedagogue, writer, philosopher and lyricist
- Lucky Lehrer (born 1958), American drummer
- Mia Lehrer (born 1953), Salvadorian-American landscape architect
- Natasha Lehrer, British writer and literary translator
- Pieter Lehrer (born 1965), a sprint canoer from Antigua and Barbuda
- Riva Lehrer (born 1958), American painter, author, and disability activist
- Robert Lehrer (1929–2017), American actor
- Scott Lehrer, sound engineer
- Steven Lehrer (born 1944), American physician, writer and translator
- Tom Lehrer (1928–2025), American singer-songwriter, satirist, pianist, and mathematician
- Warren Lehrer (born 1955), American author and artist/designer

== See also ==
- Lehr (disambiguation)
- Lerer
- Lerner (disambiguation)
