= Panzerjäger I =

German tank destroyer

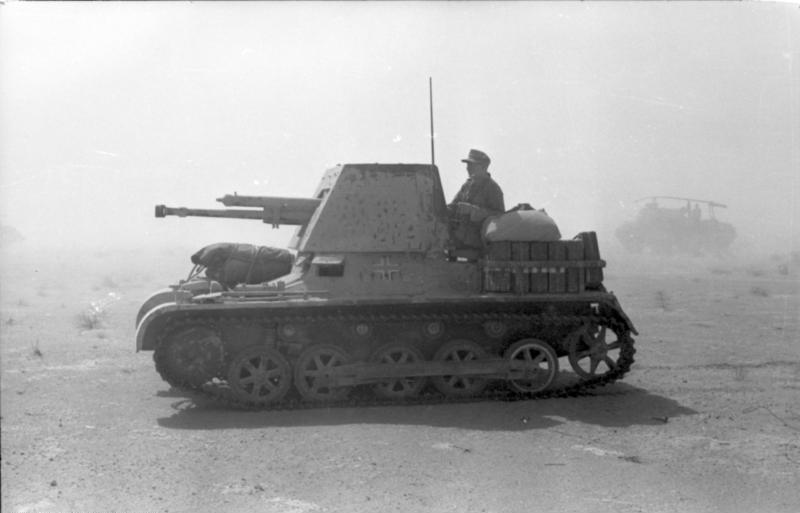
- A Panzerjäger I in North Africa
- Type: Panzerjäger; Self-propelled anti-tank gun
- Place of origin: Nazi Germany

Service history
- In service: 1940–1943
- Used by: Nazi Germany
- Wars: World War II

Production history
- Designer: Alkett
- Designed: 1939–1940
- Produced: March 1940– February 1941
- No. built: 202

Specifications
- Mass: 6.4 t (14,000 lb)
- Length: 4.42 m (14 ft 6 in)
- Width: 2.06 m (6 ft 9 in)
- Height: 2.14 m (7 ft)
- Crew: 3
- Elevation: −8° to +12°
- Traverse: 35°
- Armor: 6–14.5 mm
- Main armament: 4.7 cm (1.9 in) Pak(t)
- Engine: 3.8 litres (230 cu in) 6-cylinder, water-cooled Maybach NL38 TR; 100 hp (75 kW)
- Power/weight: 15.6 hp (11.6 kW) / tonne
- Transmission: 6 speed ZF F.G.31
- Suspension: leaf-spring
- Ground clearance: 29.5 cm (11.6 in)
- Fuel capacity: 146 L (39 US gal)
- Operational range: 140 km (87 mi)
- Maximum speed: 40 km/h (25 mph)

The Panzerjäger I (English: "tank hunter mark I") was the first German Panzerjäger ("tank hunter") to see service in the Second World War. It mounted the Czech 4.7 cm KPÚV vz. 38 (German designation "4.7 cm Pak (t)") anti-tank gun on a converted open-topped Panzer I Ausf. B chassis. It was intended to counter heavy French tanks like the Char B1 bis that were beyond the capabilities of the 3.7 cm Pak 36 anti-tank gun and extended the life of the obsolete Panzer I chassis. A total of 202 Panzer I chassis were converted to Panzerjäger I standard in 1940–41, and were employed in the Battle of France, in the North Africa campaign and on the Eastern Front.

== Design and production ==
The Panzer I turret was removed and a fixed gun shield added to protect the armament and crew. The anti-tank gun was mounted on a pedestal in the fighting compartment after wheels, axle and trails were removed, but retained its original gun shield. It normally carried 74 antitank and 10 HE shells. Alkett and contractors built 202 vehicles, the first series of 132 by Alkett in 1940. Ten of the second series of 70 were assembled by Alkett while the remainder were assembled by Klöckner-Humboldt-Deutz in 1940 and 1941. The first series had a five-sided shield.; vehicles in the second series are recognizable by their seven-sided gun shield.

The formal name was 4.7 cm PaK(t) (Sf) auf Panzerkampfwagen I ohne Turm, translating as "4.7 cm antitank gun (Czech) (self-propelled) on armoured combat vehicle I without turret".

Armor: thickness/slope from vertical
| | Front | Side | Rear | Top/bottom |
| Gun shield | 14.5 mm (0.57 in) at 27° | 14.5 mm (0.57 in) at 27° | none | none |
| Superstructure | 13 mm (0.51 in) at 22° | 13 mm (0.51 in) at 12° | 13 mm (0.51 in) at 0° | 6 mm (0.24 in) |
| Hull | 13 mm (0.51 in) at 27° | 13 mm (0.51 in) at 0° | 13 mm (0.51 in) at 17° | 6 mm (0.24 in) |

== Organization ==
Panzerjägers were organized into companies of nine vehicles, with three companies per battalion, although for the French Campaign, anti-tank battalion Panzerjäger-Abteilung 521 had just six vehicles in each company. For the remainder of the war, they were used solely by independent antitank battalions, with two exceptions post the Balkans campaign, one company was assigned to the SS-Brigade Leibstandarte der SS Adolf Hitler and another to PanzerjägerAbteilung 900 of Lehr-Brigade (mot.) 900 ("900th Motorized Training Brigade") in preparation for Operation Barbarossa.

== Combat history ==
Panzerjäger-Abteilung 521, 616, 643 and 670 had 99 vehicles in the Battle of France. Only Panzerjäger-Abteilung 521 participated in the campaign from the beginning; the other three were still training until a few days after the campaign began but were sent to the front as training finished.

Twenty-seven Panzerjäger I equipped Panzerjäger-Abteilung 605 in North Africa. It arrived in Tripoli, Libya between 18 and 21 March 1941. Five replacements were sent in September 1941 but only three arrived on 2 October, the others being lost when the freighter Castellon was sunk by the submarine HMS Perseus. At the start of the British Operation Crusader the battalion was at full strength but lost thirteen vehicles during the battles. Four more replacements were sent in January 1942 so that it mustered seventeen at the beginning of the Battle of Gazala. Despite the shipment of another three vehicles from September–October 1942, the battalion only had eleven by the beginning of the Second Battle of El Alamein. The last two replacements were received by the battalion in November 1942.

Abteilung 521, 529, 616, 643 and 670 were equipped with 135 Panzerjäger I for Operation Barbarossa. They were assigned as given below for the opening stages of the battle:

| Abteilung | Corps | Army | Army Group |
|---|---|---|---|
| 521 | XXIV Corps | 2nd Panzer Group | Army Group Center |
| 529 | VII Corps | 4th Army | Army Group Center |
| 616 | | 4th Panzer Group | Army Group North |
| 643 | XXXIX Corps (mot.) | 3rd Panzer Group | Army Group Center |
| 670 | | 1st Panzer Group | Army Group South |

By 27 July 1941, Abteilung 529 had lost four Panzerjäger I vehicles. On 23 November 1941 it reported that it still had 16 vehicles, although two were not operational. On 5 May 1942, -Abteilung 521 reported that only five of those vehicles still existed. Abteilung 529 had only two on strength when it was disbanded on 30 June 1942. Abteilung 616 seems to have been an exception as it reported all three companies were equipped with the Panzerjäger I, during mid or late 1942.

== Combat assessments ==
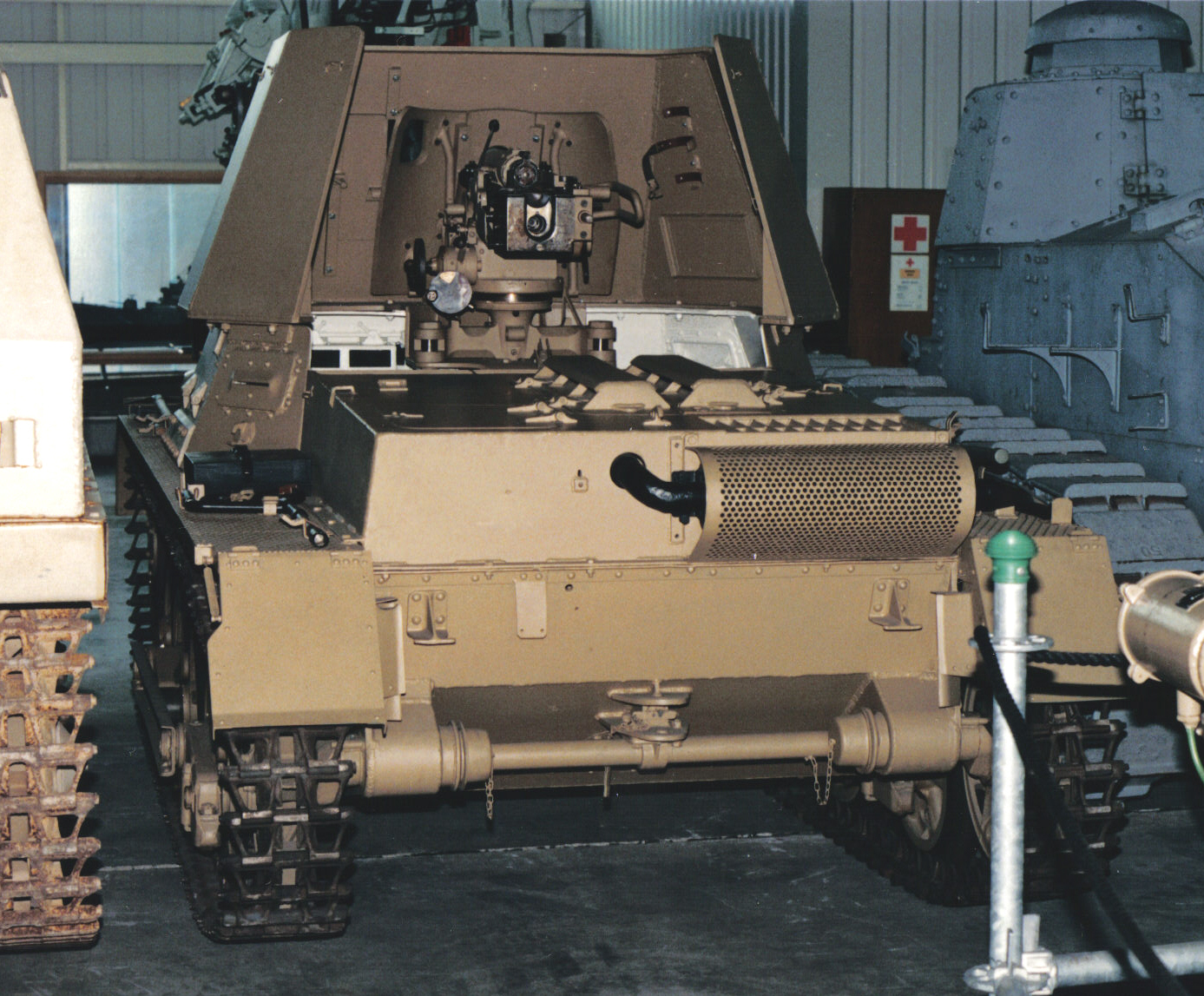
Rear view of a Panzerjäger I from the second series.

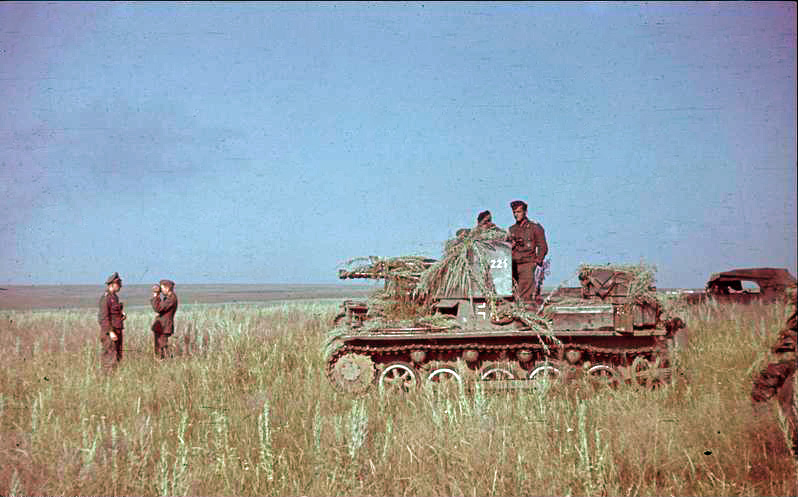
1941 colour photograph of a Panzerjäger I in western Ukraine

Abteilung 643, 25 July 1940
"The 4.7 cm (1.9 in) armor-piercing shells (Panzergranaten) were effective against 45 to 50 millimetres (1.8 to 2.0 in) thick armor at ranges up to 500 metres (550 yd) – sufficient to 600 metres (660 yd). Observation was limited; the crew, with the exception of the driver, had to look over the gun shield to observe what is in front of the Panzerjäger I, resulting in the exposure of body parts to potential dangers; namely shots to the head (also known as Kopfschüsse in German). In effect, the crew behind the gun shield were blind in urban combat, suppressing fire and individual tanks".
Abteilung 521, July 1941
"The effective range of the 4.7 cm Pak(t) is 1,000 to 1,200 metres (1,100 to 1,300 yd) with a maximum range of 1,500 metres (1,600 yd). When attacking an enemy position equipped with anti-tank guns and artillery, namely near Mogilev and Rogachev, its rather tall superstructure presented a target for artillery and anti-tank guns. Thus, the Panzerjäger is destroyed before it can get into action. When large shells explode close-by, shrapnel pierced the thin armor. Russian 4.5 cm (1.8 in) anti-tank guns already penetrated at 1,200 metres (1,300 yd) range. The 1st Kompanie lost five out of the ten vehicles (Kampffahrzeuge) in such actions, of which only two could be repaired."
Abteilung 605, July 1942
"The accuracy of this weapon was commented on; as it will usually hit its target with the first shot at ranges up to 1,000 metres (1,100 yd). However, its penetration qualities were far too low for the necessary combat ranges in the desert of North Africa. The chassis, engine and suspension were constantly in need of care due to the additional weight of the anti-tank gun. In one case, three Mk II (Matilda II infantry tanks) were penetrated at a range of 400 metres (440 yd) by 4.7 cm tungsten-core armor-piercing shell (Pz.Gr. 40). It usually penetrates 60 millimetres (2.4 in) of armor. Therefore, a small percentage of these rounds are desired. The 4.7 cm armor-piercing shell (Pz.Gr. 36(t)) will not penetrate a Mk.II at 600 to 800 metres (660 to 870 yd). But the crew will abandon the tank because fragments spall off the armor on the inside."

== See also ==
- 4,7 cm PaK(t) auf Panzerkampfwagen 35R(f) ohne Turm – similar German vehicle mounting a 47 mm gun on a Renault R35 chassis
- Semovente da 47/32 – comparable Italian vehicle using a 47 mm gun
- TACAM R-1 – Romanian project comparable in characteristics
