= Stielgranate 41 =

Artillery round

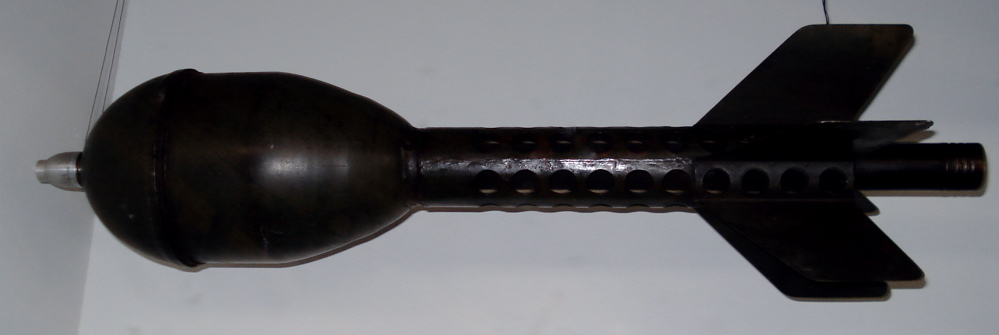
- Type: Spigot bomb
- Place of origin: Nazi Germany

Service history
- Used by: Nazi Germany
- Wars: World War II

Production history
- Designed: 1941
- Produced: 1942–1943
- No. built: 636,000

Specifications
- Mass: 8.6 kg (19 lb)
- Length: 739.8 mm (29.13 in)
- Diameter: 158.8 mm (6.25 in)
- Shell: HEAT
- Muzzle velocity: 110 m/s (360 ft/s)
- Effective firing range: 300 m (330 yd)
- Maximum firing range: 800 m (870 yd)
- Filling: 60% TNT and 40% RDX
- Filling weight: 2.42 kg (5.3 lb)
- Detonation mechanism: Impact

The Stielgranate 41 (German: "stick grenade"; model 1941), also known as 3.7 cm Aufsteck Geschoss, was a German shaped charge, fin-stabilized shell, used with the 3.7 cm Pak 36 anti-tank gun to give it better anti-tank performance.

== Design ==
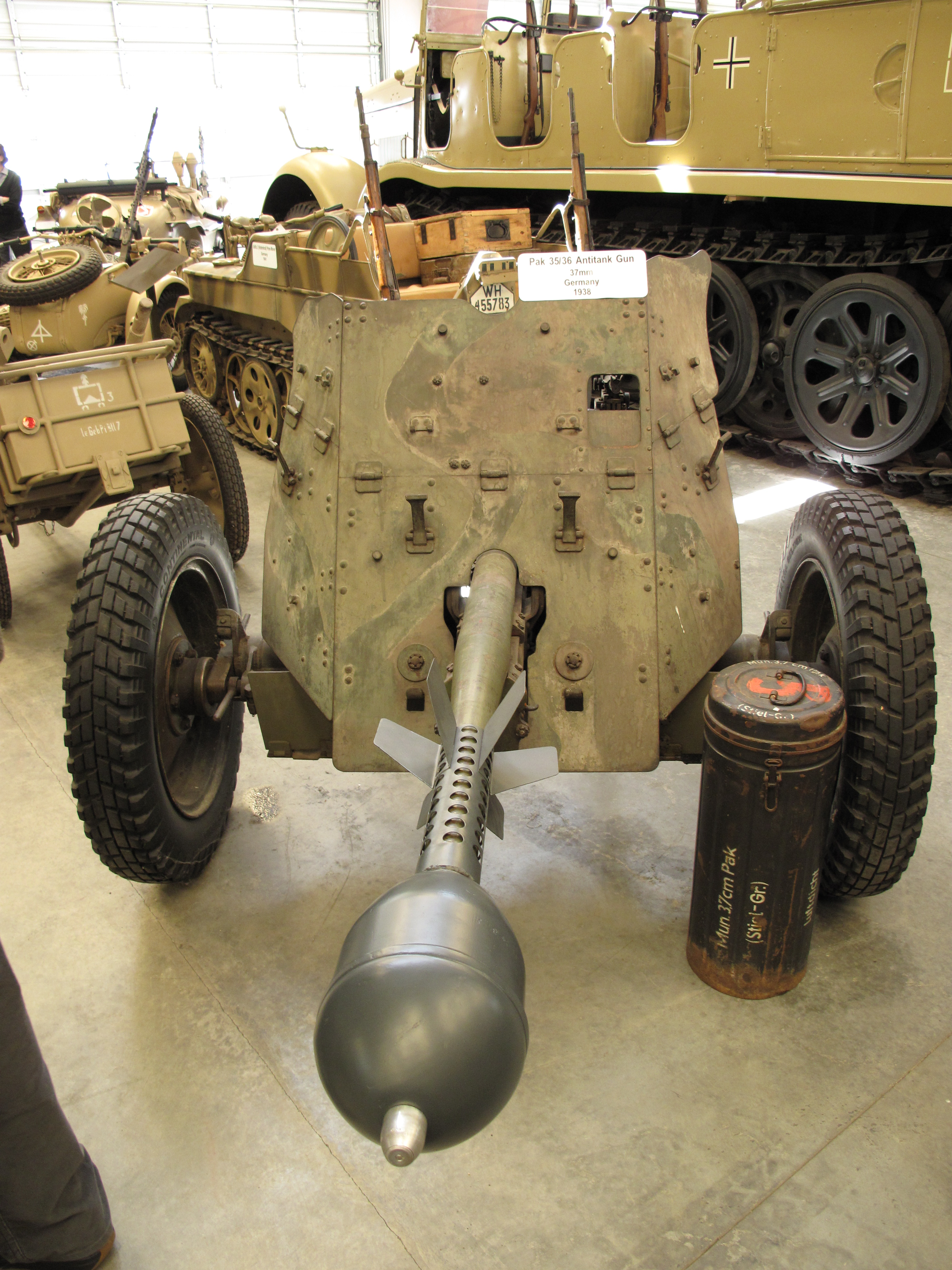
Pak 36 with Stielgranate loaded

The Stielgranate 41 looked like a rifle grenade, only considerably larger. One part of its stem, a 38 cm (15 in) long stick, was placed inside the gun barrel; the other part, a perforated tube with six stabilizing fins was fitted around it. The tube held the grenade in place until it was fired, while the perforations extracted the maximum performance from the propelling hot gases and prevented excessive blow-by.

According to Chamberlain, it was fired using a standard cartridge case containing 216 g (7.6 oz) of nitrocellulose, while Hogg gives a figure of 217 g (7.7 oz) of Ngl R P, (Note: Nitroglyzerinpulver: double base propellant made of nitrocellulose and nitroglycerin, while the R P letters stand for tubular propellant.) with a cork plug sealing the mouth of the cartridge.

It was equipped with two fuzes: the AZ 5075 (Aufschlagzünder 5075) in the nose, for direct hits, and the Bd Z 5130 (Bodenzünder 5130) in the base, to ensure detonation if the target was only grazed. The large caliber of the High-explosive anti-tank (HEAT) warhead and shaped charge containing 2.42 kg (5.3 lb) of cyclonite and TNT, enabled it to penetrate armour 180 mm (7.1 in) thick, enough to defeat any World War II tank. The hit was equally dangerous at any distance, as the shaped-charge effect is not dependent on the velocity of the round at the point of impact. However, the low velocity of the grenade − 110 m/s (360 ft/s) − limited effective range against tanks to 300 m (980 ft) or less.

While it was originally designed for use with the Pak 35/36, it was also used with captured French 47 mm APX anti-tank guns, while a Czech-designed version was used with captured 3.7 cm KPÚV vz. 37 and 4.7 cm KPÚV vz. 38 guns.

== Performance ==
=== Range ===
According to Chamberlain, the Stielgranate 41 had a range of 185 m (607 ft) when fired at an 5° angle while at a 25° it had a range of 783 m (2,569 ft). On the other hand, Hogg gives the following figures: an effective range of 300 m (980 ft) and maximum range of 800 m (2,600 ft).

=== Penetration ===
According to the British Army manuals, the grenade could penetrate about 130 mm (5 in) of rolled homogeneous armour at a 0° angle and 89–102 mm (3.5–4 in) at 30°, while Hogg stated that the Stielgranate 41 could penetrate 180 mm (7.1 in) at any distance.

== History ==
The 3.7 cm PaK 36, was the standard anti-tank gun of the Wehrmacht in 1940. A sound design, it was copied by other nations, and while its penetration was somewhat disappointing, the gun mobility more than compensated for its defects. Once it became clear that the newest Allied tanks could shrug off even direct hits from the PaK 36 by late 1940, the Germans began developing a special spigot bomb in order to give the Pak 36 a chance of destroying enemy tanks, especially since more than 20,000 guns were already issued by mid-1941.

The Stielgranate 41 was also seen as a way of alleviating the shortages of the heavier 5 cm Pak 38 and 7.5 cm Pak 40 anti-tank guns. A total of 600,900 units were produced in 1942 with a further 35,100 in 1943 before production ceased.
