= Panzer I =

German light tank

Panzerkampfwagen I Sd.Kfz. 101
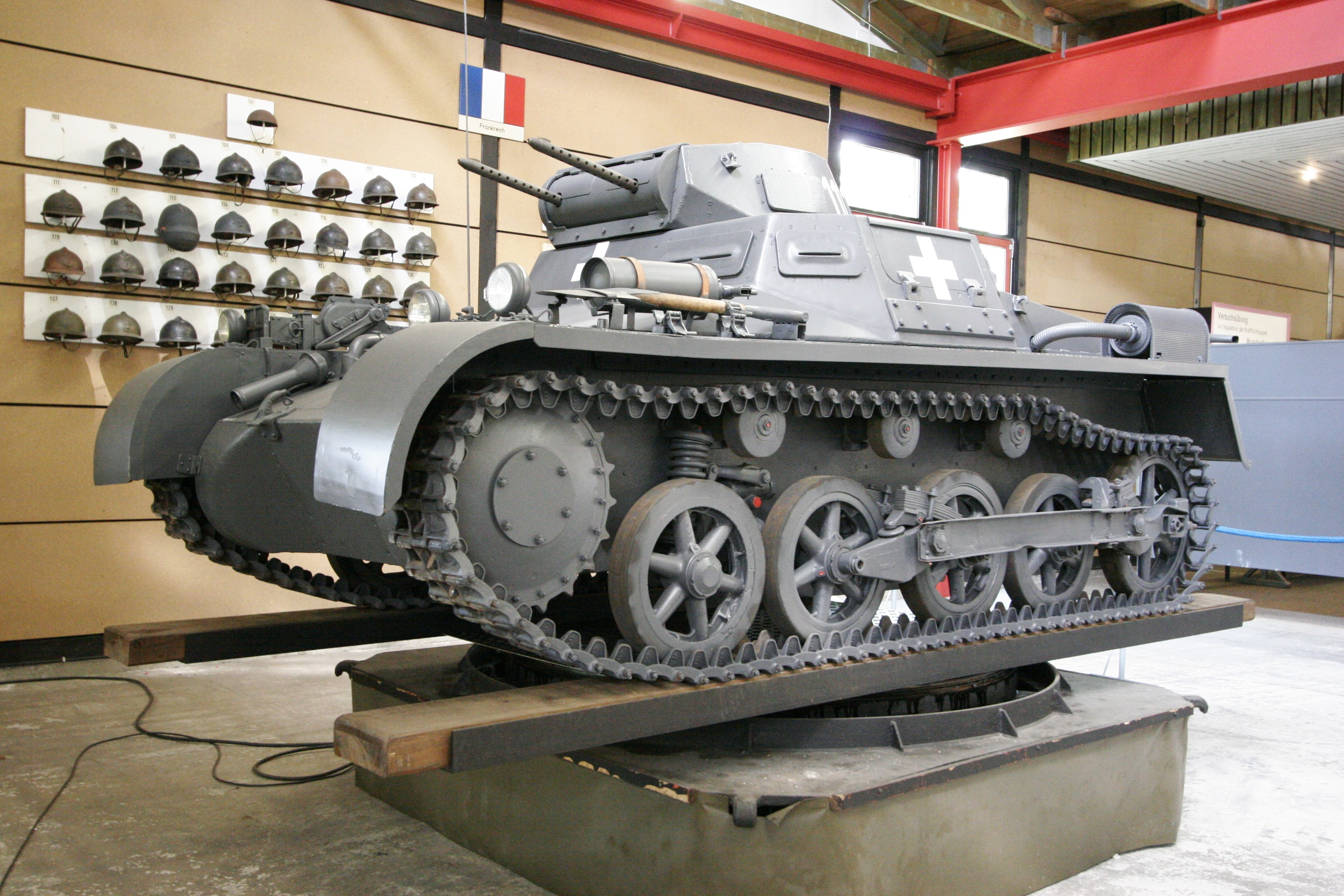
- A Wehrmacht Panzerkampfwagen I Ausf. A light tank on display at the Deutsches Panzermuseum Munster in Munster, Germany.
- Type: Light tank
- Place of origin: Germany

Service history
- In service: 1934–1945
- Used by: Nazi Germany; Bulgaria; Republic of China; Hungary; Francoist Spain
- Wars: Spanish Civil War; World War II; Second Sino-Japanese War

Production history
- Designed: 1932–1934
- Manufacturer: Henschel, MAN, Krupp, Daimler
- Unit cost: 38,000 ℛ︁ℳ︁ (Ausf. B Without weapons)
- Produced: 1934–1938, 1943
- No. built: 1,659 as light tanks 184 as command tanks 445 as training tanks 147 as special convertible chassis

Specifications
- Mass: 5.4 tonnes (6.0 short tons)
- Length: 4.02 m (13 ft 2 in)
- Width: 2.06 m (6 ft 9 in)
- Height: 1.72 m (5 ft 8 in)
- Crew: 2: commander and driver
- Armor: 7–13 mm
- Main armament: 2 × 7.92 mm MG 13 machine guns
- Engine: Ausf.A:Krupp M 305 four-cylinder air-cooled gasoline engine Ausf.B:Maybach NL38 TR Ausf.A:60 PS (59 hp, 44 kW); Ausf.B:100 metric horsepower (74 kW)
- Power/weight: 11.1 PS (8.1 kW)/t
- Suspension: Quarter-elliptical leaf spring suspension.
- Operational range: 200 km (120 mi) on-road; 175 km (109 mi) off-road.
- Maximum speed: 37 km/h (23 mph) on-road; 25 km/h (16 mph) off-road.

The Panzer I was a light tank produced by Nazi Germany in the 1930s. Its name is short for Panzerkampfwagen I (German for "armored fighting vehicle mark I"), abbreviated as Pz.Kpfw. I. The tank's official German ordnance inventory designation was Sd.Kfz. 101 ("special purpose vehicle 101").

Design of the Panzer I began in 1932 and mass production began in 1934. Initially intended only as a training tank to introduce the concept of armored warfare to the German Army, the Panzer I saw combat in Spain during the Spanish Civil War, in Poland, France, the Soviet Union and North Africa during the Second World War, and in China during the Second Sino-Japanese War. Experiences with the Panzer I during the Spanish Civil War helped shape the German Panzerwaffe's invasion of Poland in 1939 and France in 1940. By 1941, the Panzer I chassis design was used chiefly as a basis for tank destroyers and assault guns. There were attempts to upgrade the Panzer I throughout its service history, including by foreign nations, to extend the design's lifespan. It continued to serve in the Spanish Armed Forces until 1954.

The Panzer I's performance in armored combat was limited by its thin armor and light armament of two MG13 machine guns, which were never intended for use against armored targets, being intended for infantry suppression, in line with inter-war doctrine. As a design intended for training, the Panzer I was less capable than many other contemporary light tank designs, such as the Polish 7TP and the Soviet T-26, although it was still relatively advanced compared to older designs, such as the Renault FT, still in service in several nations. Although lacking as a antitank vehicle, it formed a large part of Germany's mechanized forces and was used in all major campaigns between September 1939 and December 1941, where it still performed much useful service against entrenched infantry and other "soft" targets, which were unable to respond even against thin armor, and who were highly vulnerable to machine gun fire. The small, vulnerable light tank, along with its somewhat more powerful successor the Panzer II, would soon be surpassed as a front-line armored fighting vehicle by more powerful German tanks, such as the Panzer III, and later the Panzer IV, Panzer V, and Panzer VI; nevertheless, the Panzer I's contribution to the early victories of Nazi Germany during World War II was significant. Later in the war, the turrets of many obsolete Panzer Is and Panzer IIs were repurposed as gun turrets on defensive fighting positions, particularly on the Atlantic Wall.

== Development history ==
After World War I, the Treaty of Versailles of 1919 prohibited the design, manufacture and deployment of tanks within the Reichswehr. Paragraph Twenty-four of the treaty provided for a 100,000-mark fine and imprisonment of up to six months for anybody who "[manufactured] armored vehicles, tanks or similar machines, which may be turned to military use".

Despite the manpower and technical limitations imposed on the German Army by the Treaty of Versailles, several Reichswehr officers established a clandestine general staff to study World War I and develop future strategies and tactics. Although at first the concept of the tank as a mobile weapon of war met with apathy, German industry was encouraged to look into tank design, while quiet cooperation was undertaken with the Soviet Union. There was also minor military cooperation with Sweden, including the extraction of technical data that proved invaluable to early German tank design. As early as 1926 the German companies Krupp, Rheinmetall and Daimler-Benz were contracted to develop prototype tanks armed with a 75 mm cannon. These were designed under the cover name Großtraktor (large tractor) to veil the true purpose of the vehicle. By 1930 a light tank armed with rapid-fire machineguns was to be developed under the cover name Leichttraktor (light tractor). The six produced Großtraktor were later put into service for a brief period with the 1 Panzer Division; the Leichttraktor remained in testing until 1935.

In the late 1920s and early 1930s, German tank theory was pioneered by two figures: General Oswald Lutz and his chief of staff, Lieutenant Colonel Heinz Guderian. Guderian became the more influential of the two and his ideas were widely publicized. Like his contemporary, Sir Percy Hobart, Guderian initially envisioned an armored corps (panzerkorps) composed of several types of tanks. This included a slow infantry tank, armed with a small-caliber cannon and several machine guns. The infantry tank, according to Guderian, was to be heavily armored to defend against enemy anti-tank guns and artillery. He also envisioned a fast breakthrough tank, similar to the British cruiser tank, which was to be armored against enemy anti-tank weapons and have a large, 75 mm (2.95 in) main gun. Lastly, Germany needed a heavy tank, armed with a 150 mm (5.9 in) cannon to defeat enemy fortifications, and even stronger armor. Such a tank required a weight of 70 to 100 tonnes and was completely impractical given the manufacturing capabilities of the day.

Soon after rising to power in Germany, Adolf Hitler approved the creation of Germany's first panzer divisions. Simplifying his earlier proposal, Guderian suggested the design of a main combat vehicle, which would be developed into the Panzer III, and a breakthrough tank, the Panzer IV. No existing design appealed to Guderian. As a stopgap, the German Army ordered a preliminary vehicle to train German tank crews. This became the Panzer I.

The Panzer I's design history can be traced to the British Carden Loyd tankette, of which it borrowed much of its track and suspension design. After six prototypes Kleintraktor were produced the cover name was changed to Krupp-Traktor whereas the development codename was changed to Landwirtschaftlicher Schlepper (La S) (Agricultural Tractor). The La S was intended not just to train Germany's panzer troops, but to prepare Germany's industry for the mass production of tanks in the near future; a difficult engineering feat for the time. The armament of production versions was to be two 7.92 mm MG 13 machine guns in a rotating turret. Machine guns were known to be largely useless against even the lightest tank armor of the time, restricting the Panzer I to a training and anti-infantry role by design.

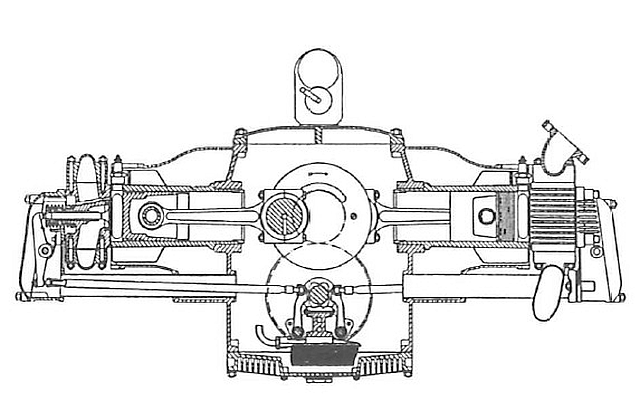
Krupp M305 4-cyl. aircooled flat boxer-engine

The final official designation, assigned in 1938, was Panzerkampfwagen I (M.G.) with special ordnance number Sd.Kfz. 101. The first 150 tanks (1./LaS, 1st series LaS, Krupp-Traktor), produced in 1934, did not include the rotating turret and were used for crew training. Following these, production was switched to the combat version of the tank. The Ausf. A was under-armored, with steel plate of only 13 millimeters (0.51 in) at its thickest. The tank had several design flaws, including suspension problems, which made the vehicle pitch at high velocities, and engine overheating. The driver was positioned inside the chassis and used conventional steering levers to control the tank, while the commander was positioned in the turret where he also acted as a gunner. The two crewmen could communicate by means of a voice tube. Machine gun ammunition was stowed in five bins, containing various numbers of 25-round magazines. 1,190 of the Panzerkampfwagen I Ausf. A were built in three series (2.-4./LaS). A further 25 were built as command tanks.

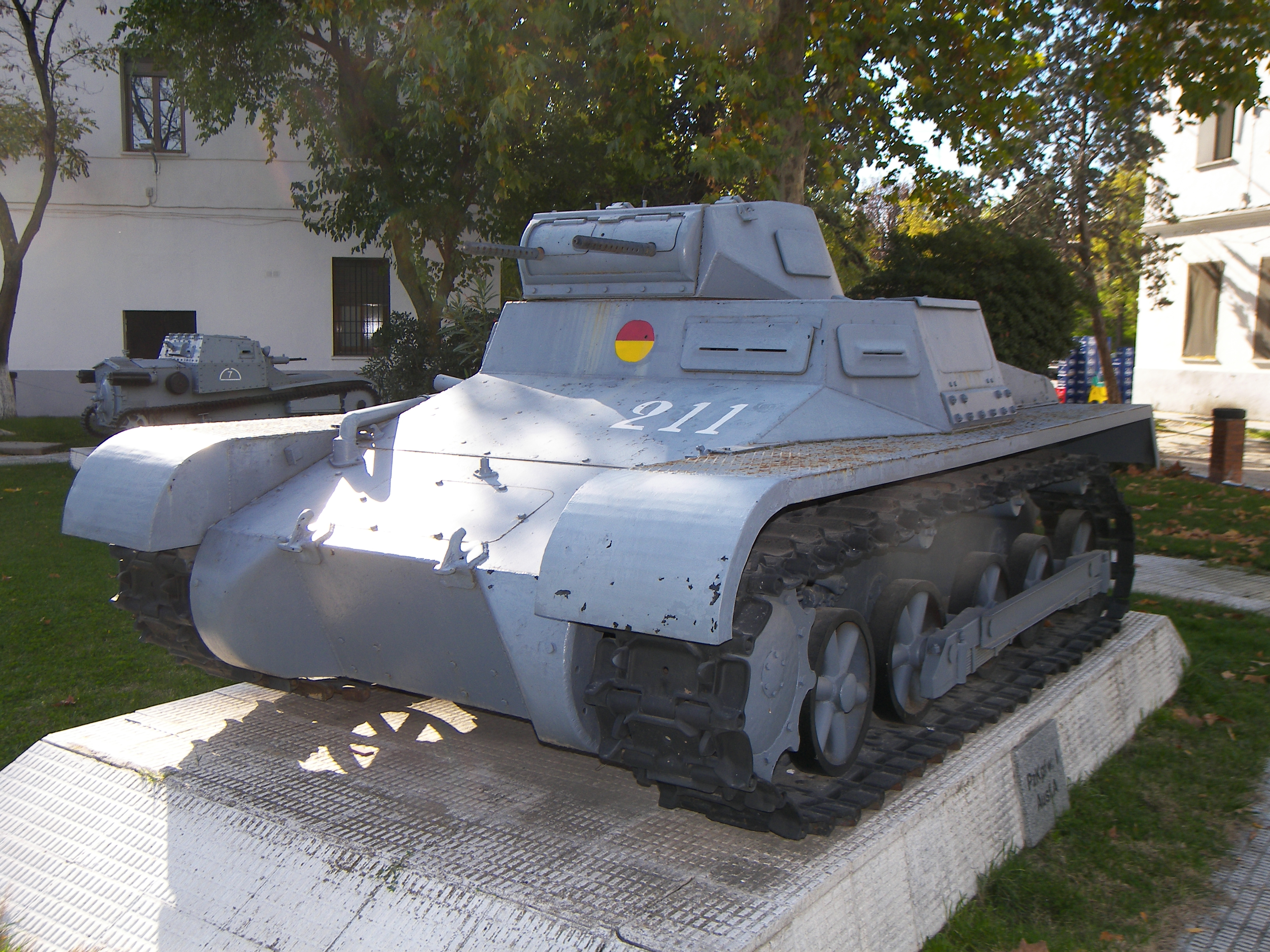
A Spanish Panzer I Ausf. A on display at the El Goloso Museum of Armored Vehicles in Spain. This particular vehicle has its original drive-sprockets and tracks replaced by those of the US M113 armored personnel carrier (APC).

Many of the problems in the Ausf. A were corrected with the introduction of the Ausf. B. The air-cooled engine (producing just 60 metric horsepower (44 kW) was replaced by a water-cooled, six-cylinder Maybach NL38 TR, developing 100 metric horsepower (74 kW), and the ZF FG 35 gearbox was changed to a FG 31. The larger engine required the extension of the vehicle's chassis by 40 cm (16 in), and this allowed the improvement of the tank's suspension, adding another bogie wheel and raising the tensioner. The tank's weight increased by 0.4 tons. Production of the Ausf. B began in August 1936 and finished in the summer of 1937 after 399 had been built in two series (5a-6a/LaS). Further 159 were built as command tanks in two series, and 295 chassis were built as turretless training tanks. 147 more training tanks were built as convertible chassis with hardened armor with the option to upgrade them to full combat status by adding a superstructure and turret.

=== Other frontline-type Panzer I tanks ===
Two more combat versions of the Panzer I were designed and produced between 1939 and 1942. By this stage, the design concept had been superseded by medium and heavy tanks and neither variant was produced in sufficient numbers to have a real impact on the progress of the war. These new tanks had nothing in common with either the Ausf. A or B except name. One of these, the Panzer I Ausf. C, was designed jointly between Krauss-Maffei and Daimler-Benz in 1939 to provide an amply armored and armed reconnaissance light tank. The Ausf. C boasted a completely new chassis and turret, a modern torsion-bar suspension and five Schachtellaufwerk-style interleaved roadwheels. It also had a maximum armor thickness of 30 millimeters (1.18 in), over twice that of either the Ausf. A or B, and was armed with a Mauser EW 141 semi-automatic anti-tank rifle, with a 50-round drum magazine, firing powerful armor-piercing 7.92×94mm Patronen 318 anti-tank rounds. Forty of these tanks were produced, along with six prototypes. Two tanks were deployed to 1st Panzer Division in 1943, and the other thirty-eight were deployed to the LVIII Panzer Reserve Corps during the Normandy landings.

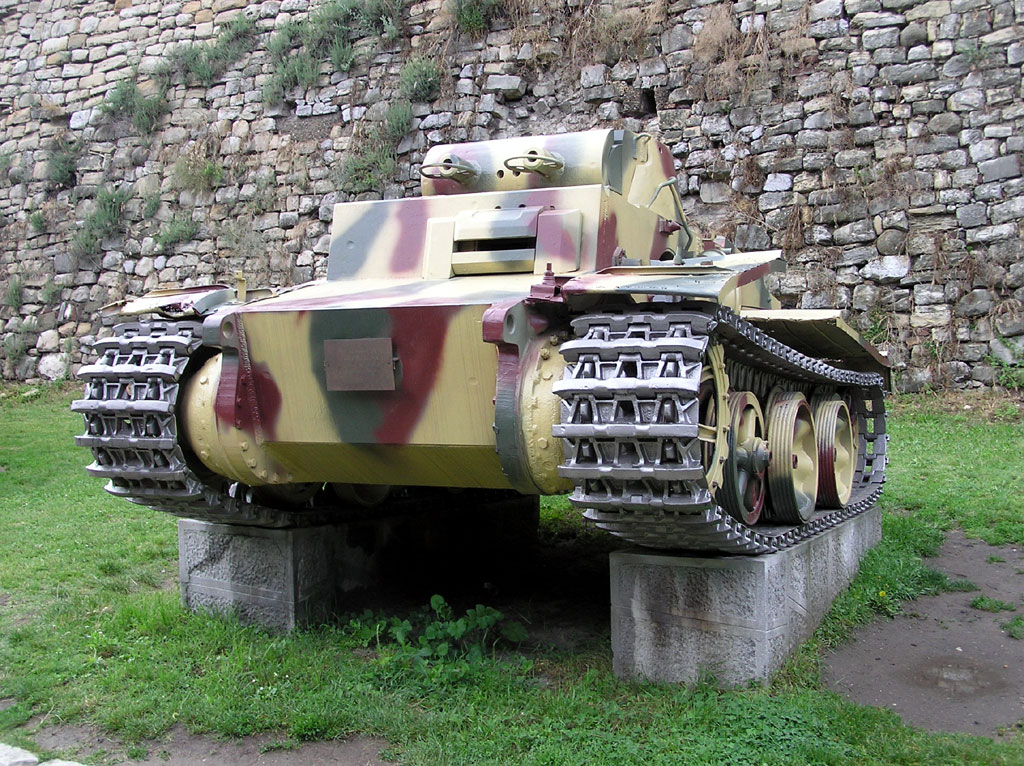
A former German Pz.Kpfw. I Ausf. F on display at the Belgrade Military Museum in Belgrade, Serbia

The second vehicle, the Ausf. F, was as different from the Ausf. C as it was from the Ausf. A and B. Intended as an infantry support tank, the Panzer I Ausf. F had a maximum armor thickness of 80 millimeters (3.15 in) and weighed between 18 and 21 tonnes. The Ausf. F was armed with two 7.92 mm MG-34s. Thirty were produced in 1940, and a second order of 100 was later canceled. In order to compensate for the increased weight, a new 150 horsepower (110 kW) Maybach HL45 Otto engine was used, allowing a maximum road speed of 25 kilometers per hour (15.5 mph) and used five overlapping road wheels per side, dropping the Ausf. C's interleaved units. Eight of the thirty tanks produced were sent to the 1st Panzer Division in 1943 and saw combat at the Battle of Kursk. The rest were given to several army schools for training and evaluation purposes.

== Combat history ==
=== Spanish Civil War ===
On 18 July 1936, war broke out on the Iberian Peninsula as Spain dissolved into a state of civil war. After the chaos of the initial uprising, two opposing sides coalesced and began to consolidate their position—the Popular Front (the Republicans) and the Spanish Nationalist front. In an early example of a proxy war, both sides quickly received support from other countries, most notably the Soviet Union and Germany as both were eager to test their tactics and equipment. The first shipment of foreign AFVs, 50 Soviet T-26 light tanks, arrived on 15 October. The shipment was under the surveillance of Nazi Germany's Kriegsmarine and Germany immediately responded by sending 41 Panzer Is to Spain a few days later. This first shipment was followed by four more shipments of Panzer I Ausf. Bs, with 122 vehicles shipped in total.

The first shipment of Panzer Is was brought under the command of Lieutenant Colonel Wilhelm Ritter von Thoma in Gruppe Thoma (also referred to as Panzergruppe Drohne). Gruppe Thoma formed part of Gruppe Imker, the ground formations of the German Condor Legion, who fought on the side of Franco's Nationalists. Between July and October, a rapid Nationalist advance from Seville to Toledo placed them in position to take the Spanish capital, Madrid. The Nationalist advance and the fall of the town of Illescas to Nationalist armies on 18 October 1936 caused the government of the Popular Front's Second Republic, including President Manuel Azaña, to flee to Barcelona and Valencia. In an attempt to stem the Nationalist tide and gain crucial time for Madrid's defense, Soviet armor was deployed south of the city under the command of Colonel Krivoshein before the end of October. At this time, several T-26 tanks under the command of Captain Paul Arman were thrown into a Republican counterattack directed towards the town of Torrejon de Velasco in an attempt to cut off the Nationalist advance north. This was the first recorded tank battle in the Spanish Civil War. Despite initial success, poor communication between the Soviet Republican armor and Spanish Republican infantry caused the isolation of Captain Arman's force and the subsequent destruction of a number of tanks. This battle also marked the first use of the molotov cocktail against tanks. Ritter von Thoma's Panzer Is fought for the Nationalists only days later on 30 October, and immediately experienced problems. As the Nationalist armor advanced, it was engaged by the Commune de Paris battalion, equipped with Soviet BA-6 armored cars. The 45 mm gun in the BA-6 was more than sufficient to knock out the poorly armored Panzer I at ranges below 500 meters (550 yd).

Comparison of light tanks in the Spanish Civil War
	T-26	Panzer I	CV.33	CV.35
Weight	9.4 t	5.4 t	2.3 t	3.5 t
Gun	45 mm cannon	2× 7.92 mm MG 13	6.5 mm or 8 mm machine gun	8 mm Breda machine gun
Ammunition	122 rounds	2,250 rounds	3,200 8 mm or 3,800 6.5 mm	3,200
Road range	175 km	200 km	125 km	125 km
Armor	7–16 mm	7–13 mm	5–15 mm	5–13.5 mm

Although the Panzer I would participate in almost every major Nationalist offensive of the war, the Nationalist army began to deploy more and more captured T-26 tanks to offset their disadvantage in protection and firepower. At one point, von Thoma offered up to 500 pesetas for each T-26 captured. Although the Panzer I was initially able to knock out the T-26 at close range—150 meters (165 yd) or less—using an armor-piercing 7.92 mm bullet, the Republican tanks began to engage at ranges where they were immune to the machine guns of the Panzer I.

The Panzer I was upgraded in order to increase its lethality. On 8 August 1937, Major General García Pallasar received a note from Generalísimo Francisco Franco that expressed the need for a Panzer I (or negrillo, as their Spanish crews called them) with a 20 mm gun. Ultimately, the piece chosen was the Breda Model 1935, due to the simplicity of the design over competitors such as the German Flak 30. Furthermore, the 20 mm Breda was capable of perforating 40 millimeters of armor at 250 meters (1.57 in at 275 yd), which was more than sufficient to penetrate the frontal armor of the T-26. Although originally 40 Italian CV.35 light tanks were ordered with the Breda in place of their original armament, this order was subsequently canceled after it was thought that the adaptation of the same gun to the Panzer I would yield better results. Prototypes were ready by September 1937 and an order was placed after successful results. The mounting of the Breda in the Panzer I required the original turret to be opened at the top and then extended by a vertical supplement. Four of these tanks were finished at the Armament Factory of Seville, but further production was canceled as it was decided sufficient numbers of Republican T-26 tanks had been captured to fulfill the Nationalist leadership's request for more lethal tanks. The Breda modification was not particularly liked by German crews, as the unprotected gap in the turret, designed to allow the tank's commander to aim, was found to be a dangerous weak point.

In late 1938, another Panzer I was sent to the Armament Factory of Seville in order to mount a 45 mm gun, captured from a Soviet tank (a T-26 or BT-5). A second was sent sometime later in order to exchange the original armament for a 37 mm Maklen anti-tank gun, which had been deployed to Asturias in late 1936 on the Soviet ship A. Andreiev. It remains unknown to what extent these trials and adaptations were completed, although it is safe to assume neither adaptation was successful beyond the drawing board.

Panzer I deliveries to Spain (1936–1939)
Date	Number of Vehicles	Additional information
October 1936	41	Formed part of the Condor Legion
December 1936	21	
August 1937	30	
End of 1937	10	
January 1939	30	
Total:	132	

=== World War II in Europe ===
During the initial campaigns of World War II, Germany's light tanks, including the Panzer I, formed the bulk of its armored strength. In March 1938, the German Army marched into Austria, experiencing a mechanical breakdown rate of up to thirty percent. However, the experience revealed to Guderian several faults within the German Panzerkorps and he subsequently improved logistical support. In October 1938, Germany occupied Czechoslovakia's Sudetenland, and the remainder of the country in March 1939. The capture of Czechoslovakia allowed several Czech tank designs, such as the Panzer 38(t), and their subsequent variants and production, to be incorporated into the German Army's strength. It also prepared German forces for the invasion of Poland.

==== Poland and the campaign in the west ====
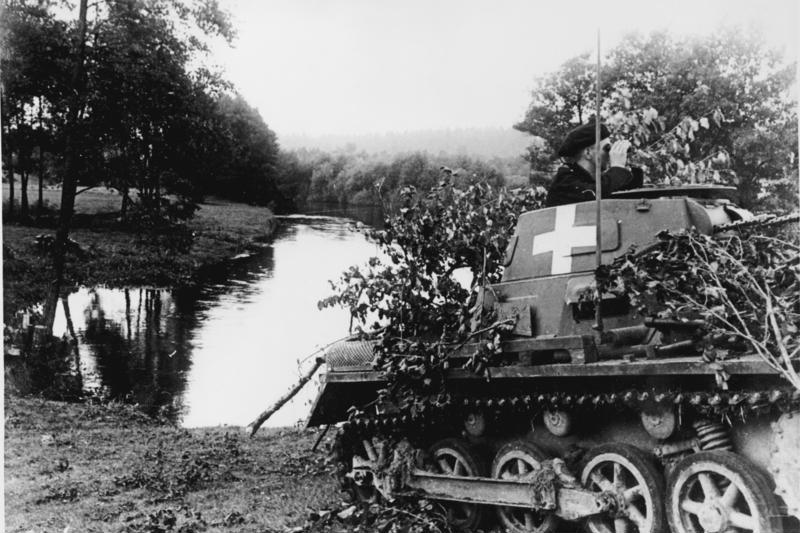
A German Panzer I Ausf A on the bank of the Brda River in Poland during the German invasion of the country, 4 September 1939

On 1 September 1939, Germany invaded Poland using seventy-two divisions (including 16 reserve infantry divisions in OKH reserves), including seven panzer divisions (1., 2., 3., 4., 5., 10., "Kempf") and four light divisions (1., 2., 3., 4.). Three days later, France and Britain declared war on Germany. The seven panzer and four light divisions were arrayed in five armies, forming two army groups. The battalion strength of the 1st Panzer Division included no less than fourteen Panzer Is, while the other six divisions included thirty-four. About 2,700 tanks were available for the invasion of Poland, but only 310 of the heavier Panzer III and IV tanks were available. Furthermore, 350 were of Czech design—the rest were either Panzer Is or Panzer IIs. The invasion was swift and the last Polish pockets of resistance surrendered on 6 October. The entire campaign had lasted five weeks (with help of the Soviet forces, which attacked on 17 September), and the success of Germany's tanks in the campaign was summed up in response to Hitler on 5 September: when asked if it had been the dive bombers who destroyed a Polish artillery regiment, Guderian replied, "No, our panzers!"

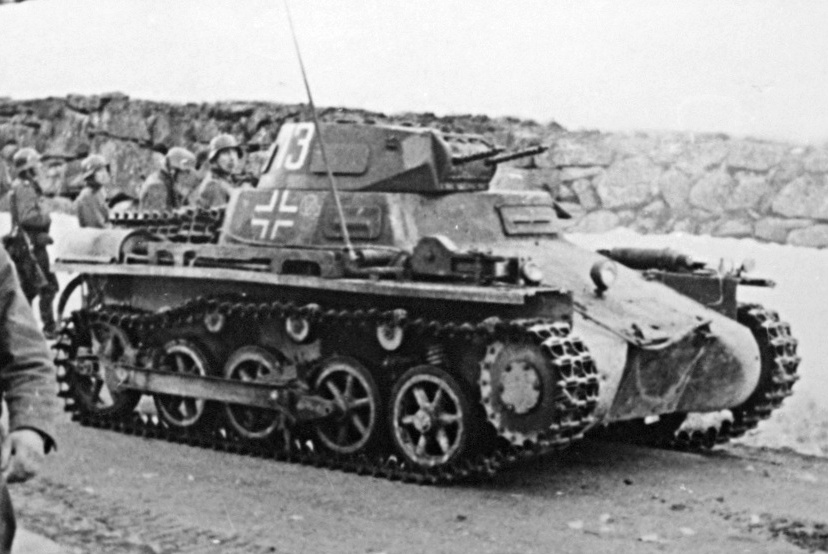
A Panzer I Ausf. A in combat during the Nazi German invasion of Norway

Some 832 German tanks (including 320 PzI, 259 PzII, 40 Pz III, 76 PzIV, 77 Pz35(t), 13 PzBef III, 7 PzBef 38(t), 34 other PzBef and some Pz38(t)) were lost during the campaign, approximately 341 of which never to return to service. This represented about a third of Germany's armor deployed for the Polish campaign. During the campaign, no fewer than half of Germany's tanks were unavailable due to maintenance issues or enemy action, and of all tanks, the Panzer I proved the most vulnerable to Polish anti-tank weapons.

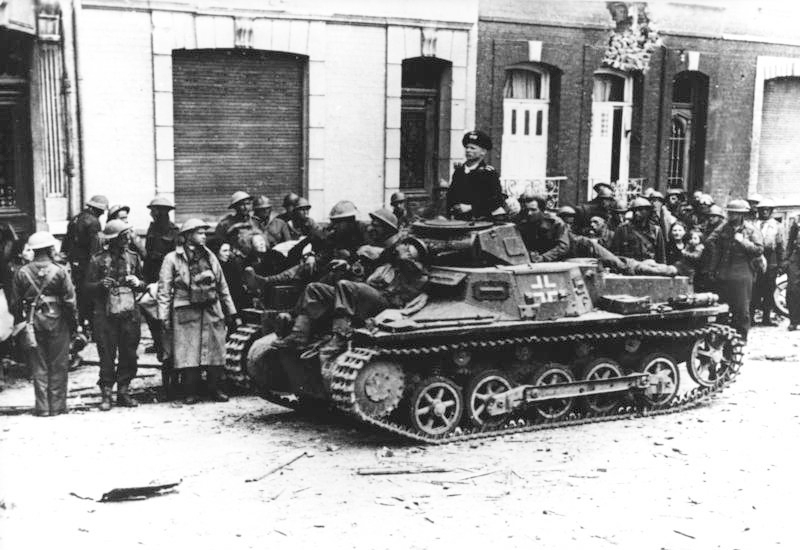
A Panzer I Ausf. B on the streets of Calais, France, in May 1940, while rounding up British prisoners-of-war following the defeat of France by Nazi Germany in that same year

Furthermore, it was found that the handling of armored forces during the campaign left much to be desired. During the beginning of Guderian's attack in northern Poland, his corps was held back to coordinate with infantry for quite a while, preventing a faster advance. It was only after Army Group South had its attention taken from Warsaw at the Battle of Bzura that Guderian's armor was fully unleashed. There were still lingering tendencies to reserve Germany's armor, even if in independent divisions, to cover an infantry advance or the flanks of advancing infantry armies. Although production was increased to 125 tanks per month after the Polish Campaign, losses forced the Germans to draw further strength from Czech tank designs, and light tanks continued to form the majority of Germany's armored strength.

Months later, Panzer Is participated in Operation Weserübung—the invasion of Denmark and Norway.

Despite its obsolescence, the Panzer I was also used in the invasion of France in May 1940. Of 2,574 tanks available for the campaign, no fewer than 523 were Panzer Is, while there were 627 Panzer IIIs and IVs, 955 Panzer II, 106 Czech Panzer 35(t), and 228 Panzer 38(t). For their defense, the French boasted up to 4,000 tanks, including 300 Char B1, armed with a 47 mm (1.7 in) gun in the turret and a larger 75 mm (2.95 in) low-velocity gun in the hull. The French also had around 250 Somua S-35, widely regarded as one of the best tanks of the period, armed with the same 47 mm main gun and protected by almost 55 mm (2.17 in) of armor at its thickest point. Nevertheless, the French also deployed over 3,000 light tanks, including about 500 World War I-vintage FT-17s. German armor enjoyed multiple advantages: radios allowed them to coordinate faster than their British or French counterparts, while the Germans also had superior tactical doctrine and markedly faster speed.

==== North Africa and Balkans ====
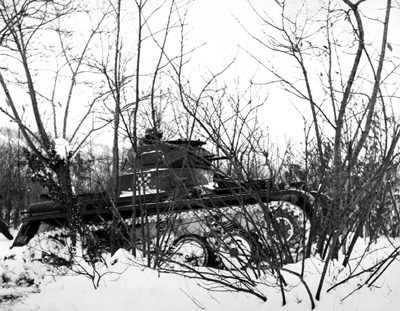
A Panzer I fighting in Yugoslavia in 1941

Setbacks in the Italian invasion of Egypt caused Hitler to dispatch aircraft to Sicily, and a blocking force (the Afrika Korps) to support their ally in the North Africa campaign. This blocking force was put under the command of Lieutenant General Erwin Rommel and included the motorized 5th Light Division and the 15th Panzer Division. This force landed at Tripoli on 12 February 1941 shortly after the British Operation Compass had routed and captured an Italian army in Italian Libya. Upon arrival, Rommel had around 150 tanks, about half Panzer III and IV. The rest were Panzer Is and IIs, although the Panzer I was soon replaced. On 6 April 1941, Germany attacked both Yugoslavia and Greece, with fourteen divisions invading Greece from neighboring Bulgaria, which by then had joined the Tripartite Pact. The invasion of Yugoslavia included six panzer divisions which still fielded the Panzer I. Yugoslavia surrendered 17 April 1941, and Greece fell on 30 April 1941.

==== Against Soviet Russia ====
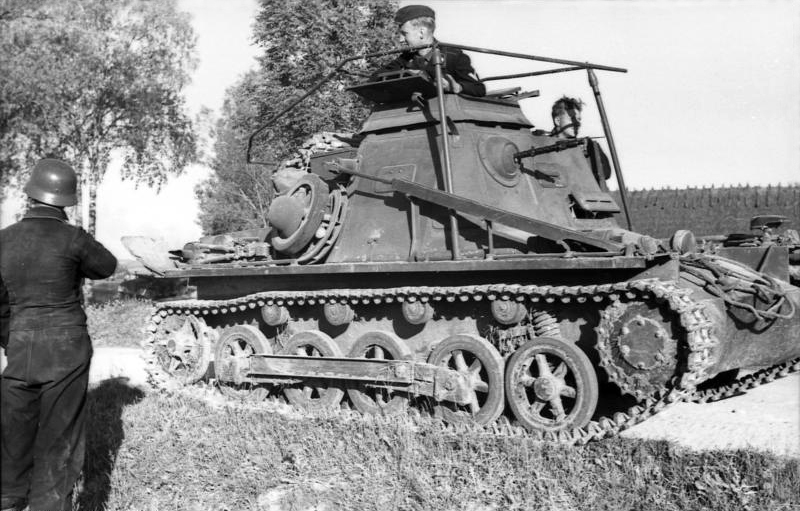
A German Sd.Kfz. 265 kleiner Panzerbefehlswagen armored command vehicle somewhere in Russia, probably in 1941 or 1942

The final major campaign in which the Panzer I formed a large portion of the armored strength was Operation Barbarossa, 22 June 1941. The 3,300 German tanks included about 410 Panzer Is. By the end of the month, a large portion of the Red Army found itself trapped in the Minsk pocket, and by 21 September Kiev had fallen, thereby allowing the Germans to concentrate on their ultimate objective, Moscow. Despite the success of Germany's armor in the Soviet Union, between June and September most German officers were shocked to find their tanks were inferior to newer Soviet models, the medium T-34 and heavy KV tanks. As seen during the Spanish Civil War only five years earlier, the Panzer I was no match for even the weakest Soviet armor. Even armored cars such as the BA-10 proving capable of defeating the Panzer I when fitted with medium-caliber anti-tank weapons. Army Group North quickly realized that none of the tank guns used by German armor could reliably penetrate the thick frontal armor of the KV-1. The performance of the Red Army during the Battle of Moscow and the growing numbers of new Soviet tanks made it obvious the Panzer I was unsuitable for this front of war. Some less battle-worthy Panzer Is were tasked with towing lorries and other light (mainly wheeled) vehicles through the thick mud of the Russian autumn to alleviate logistical and transportation issues and problems at the frontlines.

=== Others ===
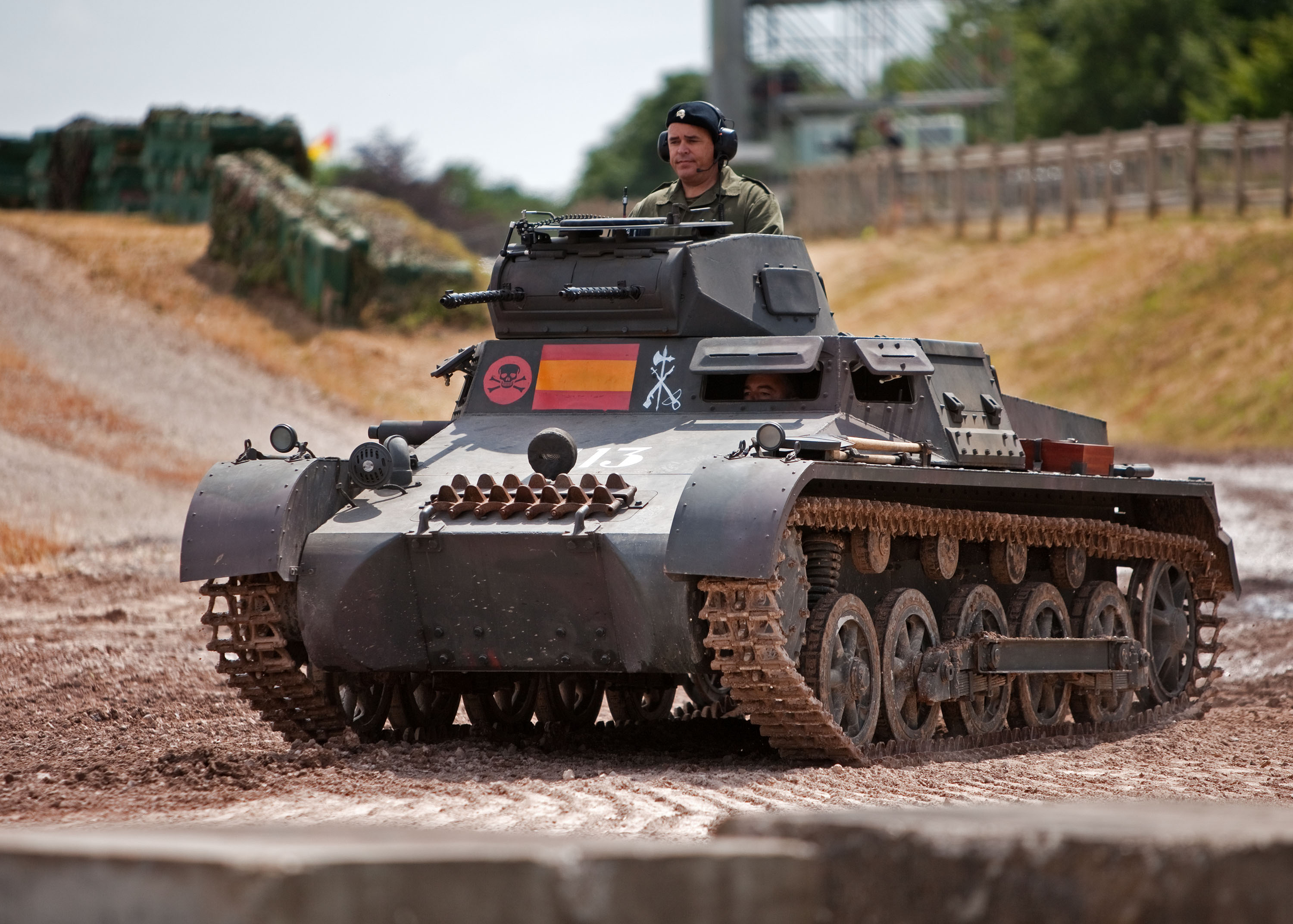
Replica Panzer I at Tankfest 2023, The Tank Museum, Bovington Camp

After Germany, Spain fielded the largest number of Panzer Is. A total of 122 had been exported to Spain during the Spanish Civil War, and, as late as 1945, Spain's "Brunete Armored Division" fielded 93. The Panzer I remained in use in Spain until aid arrived from the United States in 1954, after which they were replaced by the relatively modern M47 Patton. Between 1935 and 1936, an export version of the Panzer I Ausf. B, named the L.K.B. (Leichte Kampfwagen B), was designed for export to Bulgaria. Modifications included up-gunning to a 20 mm gun and fitting a Krupp M 311 V-8 gasoline engine. Although three examples were built, none were exported to Bulgaria, although a single Panzer I Ausf. A had previously been sold. In 1937, around ten Panzer I Ausf. As were sold to the Republic of China (ROC) during a period of strong co-operative ties between the ROC and Nazi Germany, which were subsequently fielded in the Battle of Nanjing by the 3rd Armored Battalion of the ROC's National Revolutionary Army (NRA) to fight against the Imperial Japanese Army (IJA). A final order was supplied to Hungary in 1942, totalling eight Ausf. Bs and six command versions. These were incorporated into the 1st Armored Division and saw combat in late 1942. At least 1 Panzer I Ausf. B was sent to the Army of the Independent State of Croatia.

The British The Tank Museum at Bovington Camp has a rare command version of the tank. The museum announced in 2023 that a Panzer I replica would take part in its 2023 Tiger Day and TANKFEST events. The replica was built in Belgium but is based on one preserved in a Spanish museum. It uses a modern engine and is marked in colours used during the Spanish Civil War.

== Variants ==
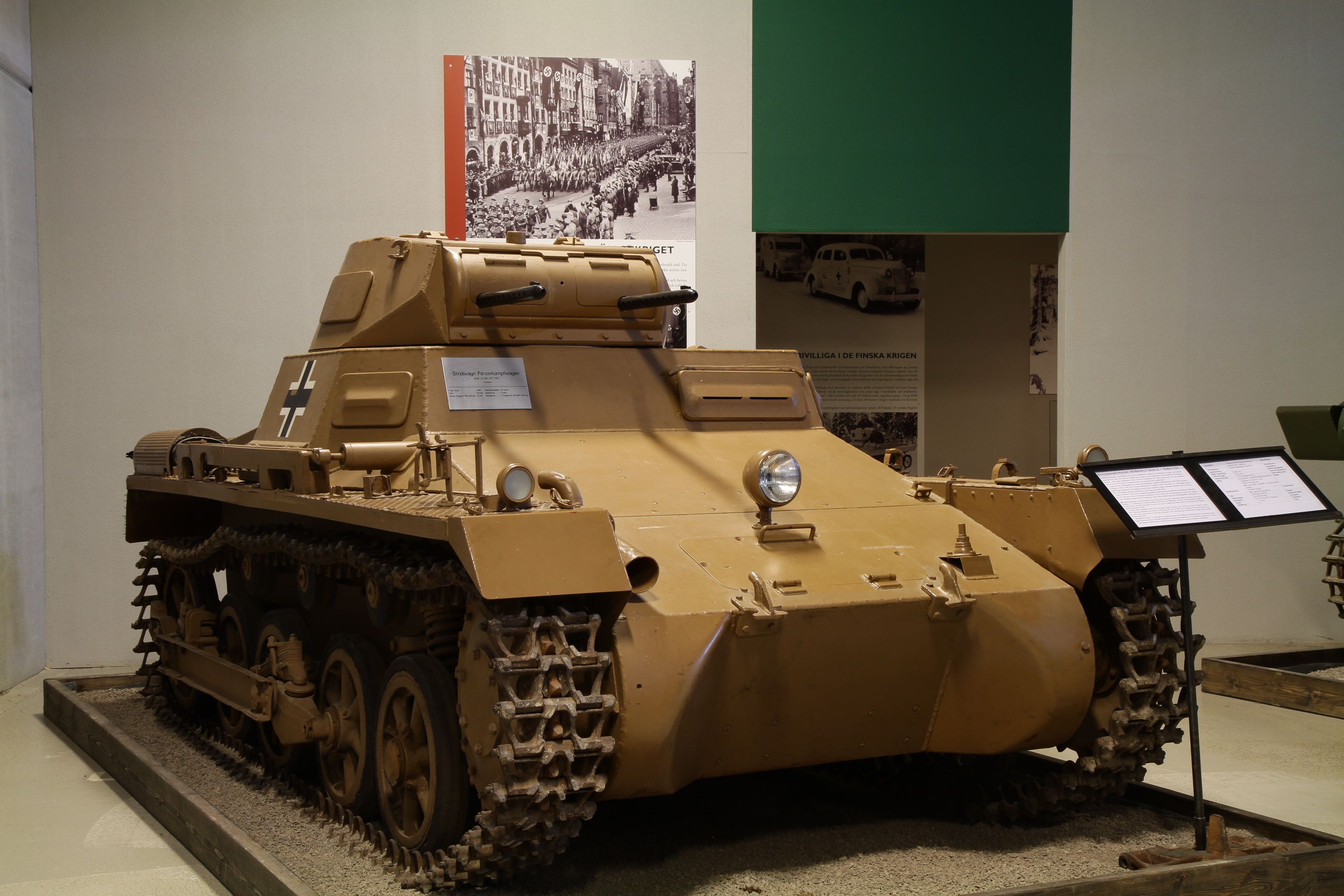
German Panzer I Ausf A, Swedish Tank Museum Arsenalen, Strängnäs, Sweden, 2013

Between 1934 and the mid-1940s, several variants of the Panzer I were designed, especially during the later years of its combat history. Because they were obsolescent from their introduction, incapable of defeating foreign armor, and outclassed by newer German tanks, the Panzer I chassis were increasingly adapted as tank destroyers and other variants. One of the best-known variants was the kleiner Panzerbefehlswagen ("small armored command vehicle"), built on the Ausf. A and Ausf. B chassis—200 of these were manufactured. The Panzer I Ausf. B chassis was also used to build the German Army's first tracked tank destroyer, the Panzerjäger I. This vehicle was armed with a Czech 47 mm (1.85 in) anti-tank gun.

== Surviving vehicles ==
Ausf. A

- Armed Forces Museum, Oslo, Norway
- Swedish Tank Museum Arsenalen, Strängnäs, Sweden
- German Tank Museum, Munster, Germany
- Museum of Armored Media, Madrid, Spain
- American Heritage Museum, Stow, United States
- MM Park, La Wantzenau, France (Restoration project)

Ausf. B

- Museum of Armored Media, Madrid, Spain
- Royal Tank Museum, Amman, Jordan
- Patriot Park, Kubinka, Russia
- Military Technical Museum, Chernogolovka, Russia
- United States Army Ordnance Training and Heritage Center, Fort Gregg-Adams, United States
- Australian Armour and Artillery Museum, Cairns, Australia
- André Becker Collection, Belgium (Hull only)

Turret

- The Wheatcroft Collection, Leicestershire, England
- Defence and Garrison Museum, Aalborg, Denmark
- Tirpitz Museum, Blåvandshuk, Denmark
- Frederikshavn, Denmark
- BAIV BV, Nederweert, Netherlands
- Bundeswehr Military History Museum, Dresden, Germany (also parts of hull and engine)
- Saint-Martin-de-Fenollar, Maureillas-las-Illas, France
- Hellenic Air Force Museum, Acharnes, Greece
- Victory Park, Moscow, Russia

== See also ==
Comparable vehicles include:

- Italy: L3/33 • L3/35
- Japan: Type 94
- Poland: TK-3 and TKS
- Romania: R-1
- Soviet Union: T-27 • T-37A • T-38
- Sweden: Strv m/37
- United Kingdom: Carden Loyd tankette
- United States Marmon-Herrington CTLS • M1 combat car

== Sources ==
- Beevor, Antony (1998). Stalingrad: The Fateful Siege: 1942–1943. Harmondsworth, England: Penguin Books. ISBN 0-670-87095-1.
- Beevor, Antony (1982). The Spanish Civil War. New York: Penguin Books. ISBN 0-14-100148-8.
- Bierman, John; Colin Smith (2002). The Battle of Alamein: Turning Point, World War II. New York: Viking Penguin. ISBN 0-670-03040-6.
- Candil, Antonio J. (March 1999), "Soviet Armor in Spain: Aid Mission to the Republicans Tested Doctrine and Equipment" (PDF), Armor, Fort Knox, KY: US Army Armor Center, pp. 31–38, ISSN 0004-2420, archived from the original (PDF) on 11 January 2012
- Cooper, Matthew (1978). The German Army 1933–1945. Lanham, MD: Scarborough House. ISBN 0-8128-8519-8.
- Daley, John (May 1999), "Soviet and German Advisors Put Doctrine to the Test: Tanks in the Siege of Madrid" (PDF), Armor, Fort Knox, KY: US Army Armor Center, pp. 33–37, ISSN 0004-2420, archived from the original (PDF) on 11 January 2012
- Franco, Lucas M. (2006). "El Tanque de la Guerra Civil Española". Historia de la Iberia Vieja (in Spanish) (13). ISSN 1699-7913.
- Franco, Lucas Molina (2005). Panzer I: El inicio de una saga (in Spanish). Madrid: AF Editores. ISBN 84-96016-52-8.
- Gander, Terry (2006). Tanks & Armour: Panzerkampfwagen I & II. Hersham, Surrey: Ian Allan. ISBN 0-7110-3090-1.
- García, José María; Lucas Molina Franco (2005). La Brunete (in Spanish). Valladolid, Spain: Quiron Ediciones. ISBN 84-96016-28-5.
- García, José María; Lucas Molina Franco (2006). Las Armas de la Guerra Civil Española (in Spanish). Madrid: La Esfera de los Libros. ISBN 84-9734-475-8.
- Guderian, Heinz (1996). Panzer Leader. New York: Da Capo. ISBN 0-674-01016-7.
- Hahn, Fritz (2003). Waffen und Geheimwaffen des deutschen Heeres 1933–1945. Eggolsheim, Germany: Dörfler Verlag.
- Latimer, Jon (2002). Alamein. Cambridge, Mass.: Harvard University Press. ISBN 0-8128-8519-8.
- McCarthy, Peter; Syron, Mike (2002). Panzerkrieg: The Rise and Fall of Hitler's Tank Divisions. New York: Carroll and Graf. ISBN 0-7867-1009-8.
- Miller, David (June 2000). Illustrated Directory of Tanks and Fighting Vehicles: From World War I to the Present Day. St. Paul, MN: Zenith Press. ISBN 0-7603-0892-6.
- Moa, Pío (2003). Los Mitos de la Guerra Civil (in Spanish). Madrid, Spain: Esfera de los Libros. ISBN 84-9734-093-0.
- Perrett, Bryan (1998). German Light Panzers 1932–41. Oxford: Osprey. ISBN 1-85532-844-5.
- Porch, Douglas (2004). The Path to Victory: The Mediterranean Theater in World War II. New York: Farrar, Straus and Giroux. ISBN 0-374-20518-3.
- Ramos, Raúl Arias (2003). El Apoyo Military Alemán a Franco: La Legión Cóndor en la Guerra Civil (in Spanish). Madrid: Esfera del los Libros. ISBN 84-9734-137-6.
- Raus, Erhard (2002). Peter G. Tsouras (ed.). Panzers on the Eastern Front: General Erhard Raus and his Panzer Divisions in Russia, 1941–1945. London: Greenhill Books. p. 253. ISBN 0-7394-2644-3.
- Spielberger, Walter J. (1974). Die Panzerkampfwagen I und II und ihre Abarten (in German). Illustrated by Hilary L. Doyle and Uwe Feist. Stuttgart: Motorbuch Verlag. ISBN 3879433356.
- Kozłowski, Eugeniusz, ed. (1979). Wojna Obronna Polski 1939 (in Polish). Warsaw: Wydawnictwo Ministerstwa Obrony Narodowej. ISBN 83-11-06314-1. OCLC 469408844.
