= Jeffrey Seller =

American theatrical producer (born 1964)

- Born: October 16, 1964 (age 61); Oak Park, Michigan, U.S.
- Education: University of Michigan (1986)
- Occupation: Producer
- Years active: 1996–present

Jeffrey Seller (born October 16, 1964) is an American theatrical producer.

He is known for his work on Rent (1996), Avenue Q (2003), In the Heights (2008), and Hamilton (2015), as well as inventing Broadway's first rush ticket and lottery ticket policies.

== Biography ==
Seller was born in Oak Park, Michigan, on October 16, 1964 at Sinai-Grace Hospital. He was adopted three months later into a Jewish family, and considers himself Jewish. Seller is a 1986 graduate of the University of Michigan.

After school, he moved to New York City, where he worked as a publicist, booking agent and theatrical producer. With his business partner, Kevin McCollum, he produced three Best Musical Tony Award-winning Broadway shows; Rent (1996), Avenue Q (2003), and In the Heights (2008).

With Broadway ticket prices increasing through the 1980s and 1990s, Seller and McCollum invented Broadway's first rush-ticket policy early on in the production of Rent. The idea was to keep the show accessible for people "in their 20s and 30s, artists, Bohemians—the people for whom Jonathan Larson wrote the show." A select number of front-row tickets would be sold for $20 on a first-come first-serve basis. Rush tickets became so popular that people began to sleep on the streets outside the theater to get a spot at the front of the line. Out of concern for the safety for those who participated in the rush ticket policy, Seller and McCollum created Broadway's first lottery ticket policy, which kept cheap tickets accessible to a young audience by selling $20 tickets to the winners of a drawing.

Together, Seller and McCollum also produced De La Guarda (1998), Andrew Lippa's The Wild Party (2000), High Fidelity (2006), [title of show] (2008), the revival of West Side Story (2009), and Bengal Tiger at the Bagdad Zoo (2011). They also executive produced the 2005 film adaption of Rent. In 2012, McCollum and Seller ended their 21-year partnership.

Seller went on to produce Sting's musical The Last Ship (2014) based on the concept album of the same name. After working with Lin-Manuel Miranda on In the Heights, he produced Miranda's next show, Hamilton (2015). Hamilton has gone on to receive widespread critical acclaim and commercial success. In June 2016, Hamilton received 11 Tony awards of a record-breaking 16 nominations, including a Best Musical win for Seller, his fourth Tony Award overall, and his first since his separation from McCollum. Hamilton's success makes Seller the only producer in Broadway history to have produced two Pulitzer Prize-winning musicals.

Shortly after the debut of Hamilton, Seller directed a workshop of a musical made from Jules Feiffer’s young-adult novel, The Man in the Ceiling.

In March 2021, Seller took the Hamilton production to Australia, selling more than 250,000 tickets before the first preview, which Seller stated was "the largest advance in the history of Australia".

Seller's memoir, Theater Kid, was released in May 2025.

== Personal life ==
Seller is gay, and has stated "I can't separate who I am from ... being a gay kid who fell in love with theater". His partner is opera director Yuval Sharon, and he has two adopted children from a prior relationship with photographer Josh Lehrer.

== Books ==
- Seller, Jeffrey (May 6, 2025). Theater Kid: A Broadway Memoir (First hardcover ed.). New York: Simon & Schuster. ISBN 9781668064184. OCLC 1517573919.
