= Lehr-Brigade (mot.) 900 =

German military unit

- Active: 1941–42
- Disbanded: 7 April 1942
- Country: Nazi Germany
- Branch: Army
- Type: Motorized Infantry
- Size: Brigade
- Garrison/HQ: Wehrkreise III
- Equipment: Sturmgeschütz III; Panzerjäger I Sd.Kfz. 251
- Engagements: Operation Barbarossa; Battle of Białystok–Minsk; Battle of Smolensk; Operation Typhoon; Battle of Moscow
- Decorations: Deutsches Kreuz in Gold (9)

Lehr-Brigade (mot.) 900 (Motorized Demonstration Brigade) was formed 17 June 1941 by the German Army from school units in preparation for Operation Barbarossa. As such it was considered an elite as many of its personnel were instructors in tactics from various branch schools. It fought in most of the battles in the central sector of the Eastern Front during Barbarossa, notably the Battles of Minsk, Smolensk, Operation Typhoon and the Battle of Moscow before its remnants were withdrawn in April–May 1942.

== Composition ==
The first battalion of Motorized Infantry Regiment (Infanterie-Regiment (mot.)) 900 was drawn from the School for Mobile Troops (Schule für Schnelle Truppen) in Wünsdorf. The battalion headquarters and the second company were mounted on Sd.Kfz. 251 half-tracks while the first company was mounted on motorcycles. The second battalion came from Infantry School (Infanterieschule) Döberitz. 13. Company (Kompanie) was equipped with two 15 cm sIG 33 and four 7.5 cm leIG 18 infantry guns. 14. Kompanie had six 3.7 cm PaK 36 and two 5 cm PaK 38 towed anti-tank guns.

Two companies of Anti-tank Battalion 900 (Panzerjäger-Abteilung) were equipped with eight PaK 36 and three Pak 38 anti-tank guns each, but the third company had nine self-propelled Panzerjäger I tank destroyers. Artillery Battalion 900 (Artillerie-Abteilung) had four batteries, three of which had four 10.5 cm leFH 18 howitzers each, but the fourth battery had seven Sturmgeschütz III assault guns. Motorized Engineer Battalion 900 (Pionier-Bataillon (mot.)) was formed from Engineer Demonstration Battalion (Pionier-Lehr-Bataillon) 2 in Dessau-Roßlau on 1 May 1941, but only the third company of the battalion was assigned to the brigade. One platoon of this company was equipped with Sd.Kfz. 251 half-tracks. Signal Battalion (Nachrichten-Abteilung) 900 was formed with two companies.

== Combat history ==
Lehr was still moving forward towards the demarcation line between German and Soviet-owned Poland on 22 June 1941 when Operation Barbarossa began and it missed the first few days of the campaign. By the beginning of July it was under the command of the 9th Army of Army Group Center, where it participated in the later stages of the Battle of Białystok–Minsk. By 19 July it was part of the northern wing encircling the Smolensk Pocket, but it quickly moved north-east to rebuff relief efforts by the Soviet 16th and 30th Armies of the Western Front. It was pulled off the front line into tactical reserve on 7 August 1941 and remained there for ten days until renewed Soviet attacks caused it to send it back into combat. It was pulled back into reserve on 26 August and remained there until the opening stages of Operation Typhoon. It stayed in reserve until 6 October when it was released to follow 1st Panzer Division's in its drive to Kalinin. The Soviets forced the Germans to retreat from Kalinin after a month of heavy fighting and Lehr was placed in reserve on 12 November, where it remained until the Soviet Winter Counter-Offensive of 5 December forced the Germans to retreat en masse.

The brigade, and most of its subordinate units, was formally disbanded on 7 April 1942, but the 900th Infantry Regiment remained in Russia until 28 May 1942 when it too was disbanded, its personnel returning to their original units.

=== Subordinations ===
Year	Month	Corps	Army	Army group	Location
1941	July		9th Army	Army Group Center	Minsk
	August	XXXIX Corps (mot.)	3rd Panzer Group	Army Group Center	Smolensk
	September		9th Army	Army Group Center	Smolensk
	October–December			Army Group Center	Kalinin
1942	January	LVI Corps (mot.)	3rd Panzer Group	Army Group Center	Velish
	February	XXXXI Corps (mot.)	9th Army	Army Group Center	Velish
	March–April		9th Army	Army Group Center	Velish
