= Robert Lehrer =

American actor

- Robert Lehrer in 1965
- Born: March 13, 1929; Los Angeles, California, United States
- Died: January 20, 2017 (aged 87); New York City, United States
- Other names: Robert Ad Hoc
- Occupation: Actor

Robert Kafka Lehrer (March 13, 1929; Los Angeles-January 20, 2017; New York City) was a stage, motion picture and television actor.

== Early years and education ==
Robert received bachelor's and master's degrees from UCLA in theater arts. He earned a PhD in theater arts from Stanford University in 1962 with a dissertation entitled "Social Awareness in the Folk Plays of Carl Zuckmayer, 1925-1931." Lehrer served in the US Army during the Korean War.

== Actor ==
Following a five-year apprenticeship with John Houseman's Professional Theater Group in Hollywood (which included a stint at CBS TV), Lehrer continued his acting career in Germany (over thirty-four years), doing commercials for the ZDF (Zweites Deutsches Fernsehen), creating voiceovers for HR Radio (Hessischer Rundfunk), as well as appearing in over thirty English-language stage productions. Lehrer returned to New York, appeared in many Off-Off-Broadway productions, and played Newton in The Private Life of Sir Isaac Newton. He had a principal role in a fall episode of the ABC sitcom Hope & Faith. He was also featured in the films Marie and Bruce, starring Julianne Moore and Matthew Broderick; Virgin (film) starring Elisabeth Moss; Descent (2007 film) starring Rosario Dawson; Our Italian Husband starring Brooke Shields.

== Robert Lehrer film clips ==
- Robert Lehrer in Hope & Faith
- Robert Lehrer in Marie and Bruce
- Robert Lehrer in Virgin
- Robert Lehrer in Descent
- Robert Lehrer in Our Italian Husband
- Robert Lehrer in Managing Patient Care
- Robert Lehrer as The Sunbather
- Robert Lehrer in The Weekend
- Robert Lehrer in A Four Letter Word
- Robert Lehrer in Artemin Goldberg: Custom Tailor of Brassieres
- Robert Lehrer 4 Minute Reel
