= Marguerite Lehr =

American mathematician

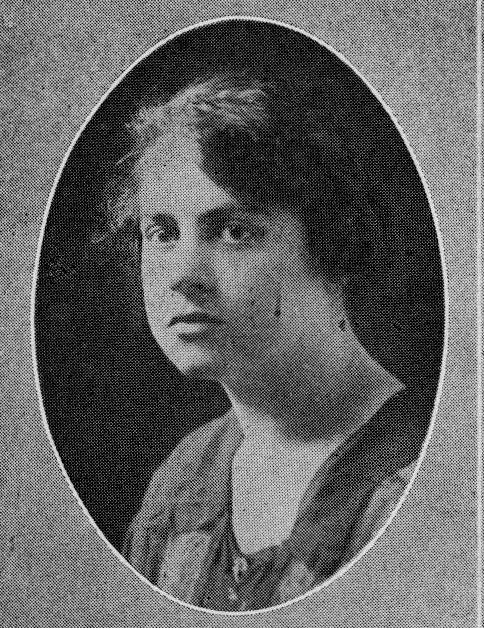
- Born: October 22, 1898; Baltimore, Maryland
- Died: December 14, 1987 (aged 89)
- Awards: Fellow of the American Association for the Advancement of Science

Academic background
- Education: Goucher College; Sapienza University of Rome; Bryn Mawr College

Academic work
- Institutions: Bryn Mawr College,
- Main interests: Mathematician

Marguerite Lehr (October 22, 1898 – December 14, 1987) was an American mathematician who studied algebraic geometry, humanism in mathematics, and mathematics education.

== Early life and education ==
Born on October 22, 1898, to Margaret Kreuter and George Lehr in Baltimore, Marguerite Lehr attended Goucher College for her undergraduate education and graduated with a bachelor's degree in 1919. After her undergraduate education, Lehr moved to Rome to study at the University of Rome for the 1923–1924 academic year, funded by the American Association of University Women and the M. Carey Thomas University Fellowship. In 1925, Lehr earned her Ph.D. at Bryn Mawr College.

== Career and research ==
After earning her doctorate, Lehr stayed at her alma mater, Bryn Mawr, as an instructor; she was promoted to associate lecturer in 1929, assistant professor in 1935, and associate professor in 1937. In 1955, she was made a full professor. While at Bryn Mawr, she had temporary or honorary appointments at several other universities. At Johns Hopkins University, she was an honorary fellow from 1931 to 1932; she was also a visiting fellow at Princeton University from 1956 to 1957. In 1958 she was given a traveling lectureship by the Mathematical Association of America and the National Science Foundation, and was funded to give lectures across the country. She also worked with the MAA and NBC to produce educational films about mathematics, and conducted a televised lecture course on mathematics in 1953 and 1954. While at Princeton, and for the following decade, she was a member of the Woodrow Wilson Fellowship Award committee. She was also a member of the International Federation of University Women awards committee. Lehr lectured at Swarthmore College in the summer of 1944, and researched at the Institut Henri Poincaré in Paris in 1950.

== Honors and awards ==
Lehr was honored by Goucher College for her work with a "distinguished citation" in 1954. She was a fellow of the American Association for the Advancement of Science, a member of the American Mathematical Society, the International Biometric Society, the Institute of Mathematical Statistics, and the Mathematical Association of America.
