= Jane Lehr =

American electrical engineer

Jane M. Lehr is an American electrical engineer whose research concerns pulsed power, liquid dielectrics, and ultra-wideband transmission techniques to lead towards high production of electrical energy and power. She is a professor of electrical and computer engineering at the University of New Mexico, the former president of the IEEE Nuclear and Plasma Sciences Society, and a coauthor of the book Foundations of Pulsed Power Technology.

== Education and career ==
Lehr majored in engineering physics at the Stevens Institute of Technology, where she graduated in 1985. She completed a Ph.D. in electrical engineering at New York University in 1996.

After working in industry, she became a research engineer for the Air Force Research Laboratory at Kirtland Air Force Base in Albuquerque, New Mexico from 1997 to 2002, and then a research physicist at the Sandia National Laboratories in Albuquerque from 2002 to 2013, associated with Sandia's Z Pulsed Power Facility. During this time, she was president of the IEEE Nuclear and Plasma Sciences Society for the 2007–2008 term.

In 2013, she moved to the University of New Mexico as chair of the Department of Electrical & Computer Engineering.

== Book ==
Lehr is a coauthor of the book Foundations of Pulsed Power Technology (with Pralhad Ron, Wiley and IEEE Press, 2018).

== Recognition ==
Lehr was named an IEEE Fellow in 2008, "for contributions to high power switches for generating electromagnetic radiation". She is the 2015 recipient of the Richard F. Shea Distinguished Member Award of the IEEE Nuclear and Plasma Sciences Society, given to her "for outstanding contributions to the leadership of the IEEE Nuclear and Plasma Sciences Society and the IEEE NPSS Pulsed Power Science and Technology Technical Committee".
