= 4.7 cm KPÚV vz. 38 =

Anti-tank gun of Czechoslovak origin

4.7 cm KPÚV vz. 36 4.7 cm KPÚV vz. 38
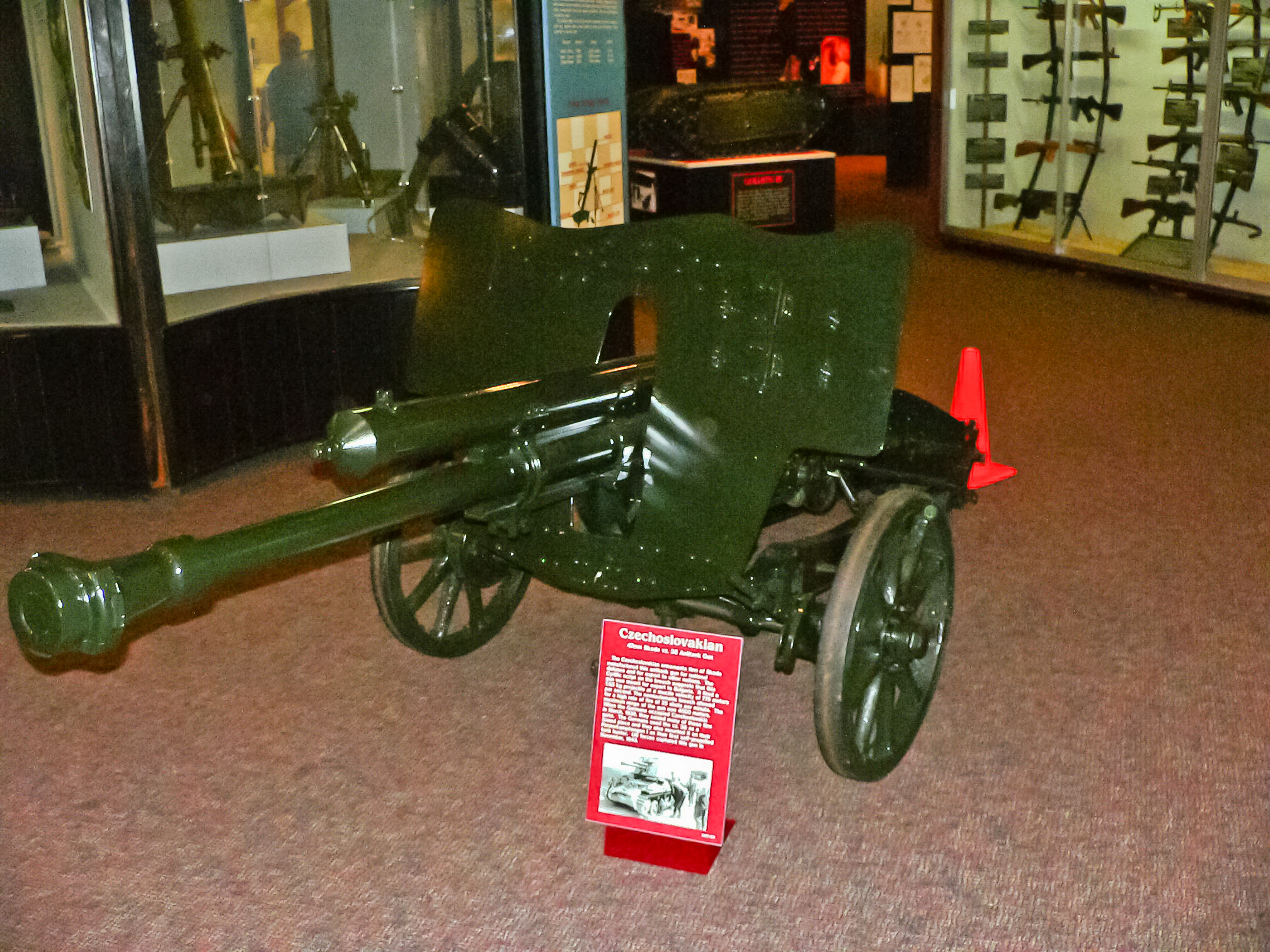
- In the United States Army Ordnance Museum
- Type: Anti-tank gun
- Place of origin: Czechoslovakia

Service history
- In service: 1939–1945
- Used by: Czechoslovakia; Nazi Germany; Romania; Yugoslavia
- Wars: World War II

Production history
- Designed: 1936
- Manufacturer: Škoda Works
- Produced: 1939–1940

Specifications
- Mass: 590 kg (1,300 lbs)
- Barrel length: 2.04 m (6 ft 8 in) L/43
- Diameter: 4.7 cm
- Crew: 4
- Shell: Fixed QF 47×405 mm R
- Shell weight: 1.6 kg (3 lb 8 oz)
- Caliber: 47 mm (1.85 in)
- Carriage: Split trail
- Elevation: -8° to +26°
- Traverse: 50°
- Muzzle velocity: 775 m/s (2,542 ft/s)
- Maximum firing range: 4,000 m (4,375 yds)

The 4.7 cm KPÚV vz. 38 (Czech: kanón proti útočné vozbě vzor 38), also known as the 4.7 cm KPÚV vz. 36 (Czech: kanón proti útočné vozbě vzor 36), is an anti-tank gun produced by the Škoda Works that saw service in World War II.

== History ==
Originally designed for the Czechoslovak Army, some were also sold to Yugoslavia. A number were appropriated by the Germans after the German occupation of Czechoslovakia in 1939 and used under the names 4.7 cm PaK (t) or PaK 36(t). The Germans continued production and mounted the PaK (t) on the Panzerkampfwagen I chassis as the Panzerjäger I tank destroyer. A similar attempt to mount it on the chassis of captured Renault R-35 tanks was less successful.

== Design ==
The barrel has the unique feature of being able to swing 180° so that it lays flat over the trails for transport and the outer part of the trails can also be folded inward to reduce its size. The gun has a small gun shield and wooden-spoked wheels. Despite its dated appearance it was superior to most contemporary designs and the gun is armed with both AP rounds and HE rounds for infantry support.

== Performance ==
Armor penetration
Range	Contact angle 0°
100 m (110 yd)	87 mm (3.4 in)
500 m (550 yd)	69 mm (2.7 in)
1,000 m (1,100 yd)	52 mm (2.0 in)
1,500 m (1,600 yd)	39 mm (1.5 in)

== See also ==
- Weapons of Czechoslovakia interwar period
