= MG 13 =

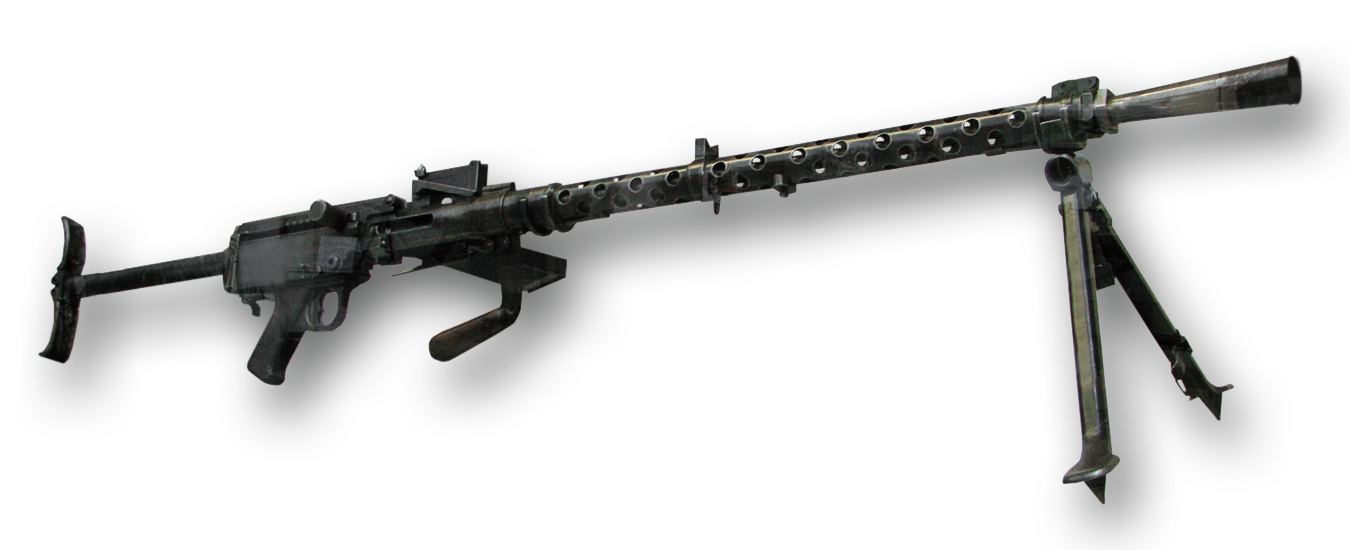
- Maschinengewehr 13
- Type: Light machine gun
- Place of origin: Weimar Republic

Service history
- In service: 1930–1945 (Germany)
- Used by: See Users
- Wars: Spanish Civil War; World War II; Second Sino-Japanese War; Chinese Civil War; Portuguese Colonial War

Production history
- Designed: 1928
- Produced: 1930–1934

Specifications
- Mass: 13.3 kg (29 lb)
- Length: 1,443 mm (56.8 in)
- Barrel length: 718 mm (28.3 in)
- Cartridge: 7.92×57mm Mauser
- Action: Short recoil, fired from closed bolt
- Rate of fire: 600 rounds/min
- Muzzle velocity: 890 m/s (2,900 ft/s)
- Maximum firing range: 2,000 metres (2,200 yd)
- Feed system: 25-round box magazine, or 75-round saddle drum magazine, 5-round stripper clip

The MG 13 (the shortened version of the German word Maschinengewehr 13) is a German light machine gun developed by converting the Dreyse Model 1918 heavy water-cooled machine gun into an air-cooled version.

== History ==
In 1907 Louis Schmeisser of Erfurt patented a machine gun which was named in honor of the inventor of the Dreyse needle gun by the executives of the factory where it was created, which was founded by Dreyse. After the 1912 version of the Dreyse machine gun was evaluated, a new version was designed in 1918 to replace it. This version would eventually serve as the base of the MG 13. The Dreyse machine gun was a heavy, usually tripod mounted, belt-fed and water cooled machine gun.

The 1907 model was succeeded by the 1912 model, which was in turn succeeded by the 1918 model. At some point an order was given to the Suhl-based Simson company, to modernize the 1918 model, which resulted in the creation of the Maschinengewehr 13.

== Usage ==
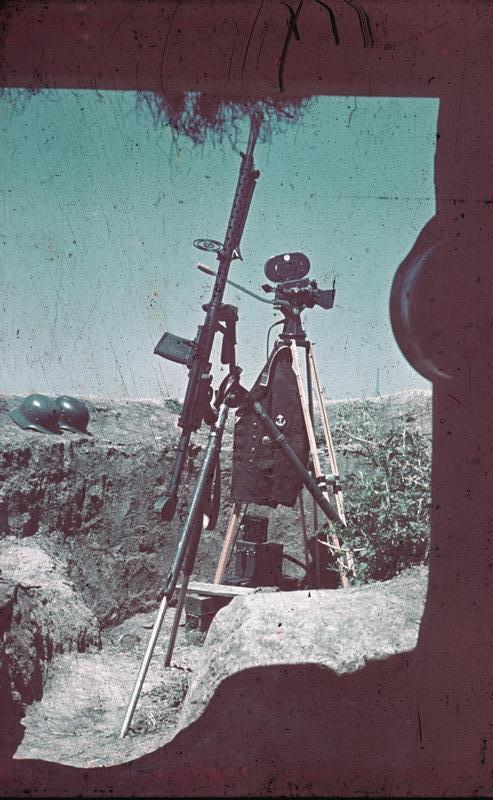
MG 13 in Anti-Aircraft Mount.

The MG 13 was introduced into service in 1930, where it served as the standard light machine gun of Germany until 1935. It was superseded by the MG 34 and later by the MG 42.

An unusual feature of the MG 13 was its double-crescent trigger, which provided a select fire capability without the need for a fire mode selector switch. Pressing the upper segment of the trigger produced semi-automatic fire, while pressing the lower segment of the trigger produced fully automatic fire. It fires from a closed bolt, by using an internal hammer.

Surplus units of the MG 13 were supplied to Francisco Franco and to his Falangist political party in order to assist them in the Spanish Civil War. Later on they were instead sold to his Spanish State, where they retained the original German MG 13 designation. They were also sold to Portugal, where they remained in active service until the late 1940s as the Metralhadora 7,92 mm m/1938 Dreyse.

As the MG 34 was introduced into service, the MG 13 was slowly phased out and placed in storage. However, they were reissued during World War II, primarily to static defense and lower quality units. Because it was fairly easy to handle and to reload the machine gun, these lesser quality troops were generally capable of using the MG 13 rather efficiently.

On later examples a 75-round "double drum" (saddle drum) magazine was also used. It was equipped with a folding butt stock and a carrying handle. It was used in the turret of the Panzerkampfwagen I.

The Chinese Nationalist government also imported the MG 13, together with the Panzerkampfwagen I Ausf. A light tank from Germany, in 1936. A year later, those MG 13s were being used by the Chinese National Revolutionary Army against Japan's Imperial Japanese Army during the Second Sino-Japanese War. Portugal used it as a squad automatic weapon (SAW) during the Portuguese Colonial War, under the name m/938.

The Bundeswehr Museum of German Defense Technology in Koblenz has a specimen of the MG 13 in its collection.

== Users ==
- Weimar Republic
- Nazi Germany
- Norway: After World War II, the Norwegian Police Service received MG 13s that were previously owned by Germany, which were then converted into the MG 13k variant.
- Portugal
- Republic of China
- Spanish State
