= Josh Lehrer =

American photographer

Josh Lehrer is a commercial and fine-art photographer. He is known for his photo series and book, Hamilton: Portraits of the Revolution, which includes cast portraits from worldwide productions of Hamilton including Lin Manuel Miranda, Leslie Odom Jr., Daveed Diggs, and Renée Elise Goldsberry.

He is a graduate of Boston University and the International Center of Photography. He shares two children with his former partner, Jeffrey Seller.
