= Lerer =

Lerer is a surname. Notable people with the surname include:

- Kenneth Lerer, American businessman and media executive
- Seth Lerer (born 1955), scholar of English and Comparative Literature
- Yechiel Lerer (1910–1943), Yiddish poet
