= 3.7 cm Pak 36 =

German anti-tank gun

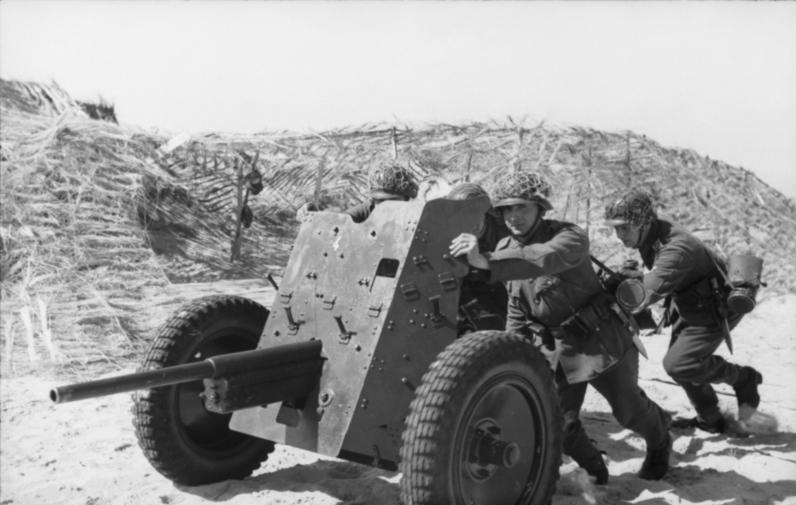
- A Pak 36 in Northern France, 1944
- Type: Anti-tank gun
- Place of origin: Germany

Service history
- In service: 1936–1945
- Used by: See Operators
- Wars: World War II; Second Italo-Ethiopian War; Spanish Civil War; Second Sino-Japanese War

Production history
- Designer: Rheinmetall
- Designed: 1934
- Manufacturer: Rheinmetall
- Unit cost: 900 man-hours 5,730 RM
- Produced: 1933–1943
- No. built: 20,000

Specifications
- Mass: Travel: 450 kg (990 lb); Combat: 327 kg (721 lb)
- Barrel length: 1.66 m (5 ft 5 in) L/45
- Width: 1.65 m (5 ft 5 in)
- Height: 1.17 m (3 ft 10 in)
- Crew: 5 (Commander, gunner, loader, two ammunition bearers)
- Shell: 37×249mmR
- Caliber: 37 mm (1.45 in)
- Elevation: -5° to +25°
- Traverse: 30° right and left
- Rate of fire: 13 rpm
- Muzzle velocity: 762 m/s (2,500 ft/s)
- Maximum firing range: 5,484 m (5,997 yds)

The Pak 36 (Panzerabwehrkanone 36) is a 3.7 cm / 37mm caliber German anti-tank gun used during the Second World War. It was the main anti-tank weapon of Wehrmacht Panzerjäger units until 1942. Developed by Rheinmetall in 1933, it was first issued to the German Army in 1936, with 9,120 being available by the beginning of the war in September 1939 and a further 5,339 produced during the war. As the predominant anti-tank gun design in the world during the late 1930s, demand was high for the Pak 36, with another 6,000 examples produced for export and the design being copied by the Soviet Union as the 45 mm anti-tank gun M1932 (19-K) and by other nations such as Japan.

It first saw service during the Spanish Civil War in 1936, where it performed well against the light tanks of the conflict. It was first used during the Second World War against Poland in 1939 and had little difficulty with any of the Polish tanks. The Battle of France in 1940 revealed its inadequate penetration capability against French and British heavier tanks, particularly the Char B1, and especially the Matilda II, receiving the derisive nicknames "Heeresanklopfgerät" ("army door-knocking device") or "PanzerAnklopfKanone" ("tank door-knocking cannon") from its crews, but it sufficed to defeat the bulk of the Allied armor in the campaign. The invasion of the Soviet Union brought the Pak 36 face to face with large numbers of T-34 and KV-1 tanks, which were invulnerable to damage by penetration. However, 91% of the Soviet tank forces in 1941 consisted of lighter types that lacked sufficient armor to defeat the gun, and the Pak 36 knocked out thousands of such tanks.

The Pak 36 began to be replaced from late 1940 onward by the 5 cm Pak 38 anti-tank gun and from November 1941 by the 7.5 cm Pak 40. This process was accelerated by the engagements with the modern Soviet tanks, and Pak 36 production ceased entirely in early 1943. The introduction in 1942 of the Stielgranate 41 shaped charge gave it the ability to punch through the armor of any Allied tank, but the ammunition's short range made the Pak 36 crews vulnerable to enemy fire and could not solve the gun's basic obsolescence. German paratroopers employed the gun due to its low weight and consequent high maneuverability. The Pak 36 was also used by Axis-allied, second-line, garrison and training units until the end of the war.

== History ==
Design of a horse-drawn, 3.7 cm anti-tank gun (designated 3.7 cm Pak L/45) by Rheinmetall commenced in 1924 and the first guns were issued in 1928. By the early 1930s, it was apparent that horse-drawn artillery was obsolescent, and the gun was modified for motorized transport by substituting magnesium-alloy wheels and pneumatic tires for the original spoked wooden wheels, allowing it to be towed at highway speeds. Re-designated the 3.7 cm Pak 35/36, it began to replace the 3.7 cm Pak L/45 in 1934 and first appeared in combat in 1936 during the Spanish Civil War. It formed the basis for many other nations' anti-tank guns during the first years of World War II. The KwK 36 L/45 was the same gun, but used as the main armament on several tanks, most notably the early models of the Panzer III. The Soviets copied the Pak 36 carriage design for their 45 mm M1937 AT gun.

=== Operational history ===
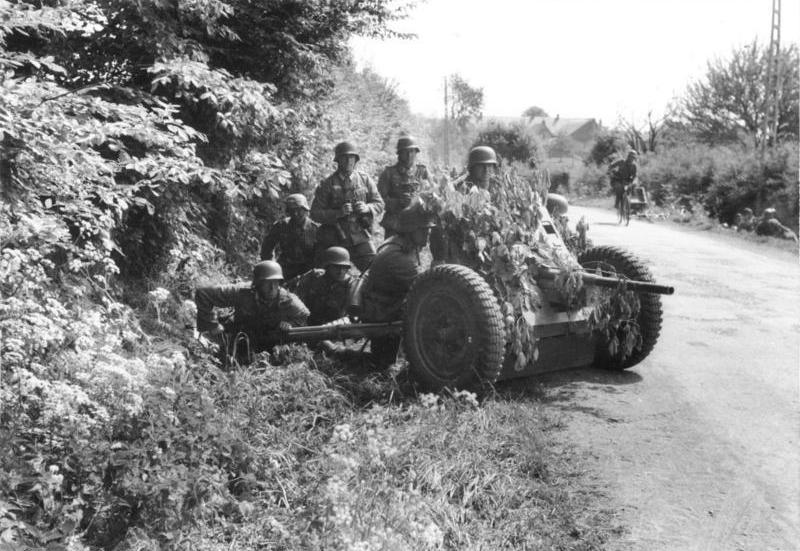
German soldiers with the 3.7 cm Pak 36 anti-tank gun in Belgium, May 1940.

During the May 1940 Western Campaign, the Pak 36, being a relatively small-calibre weapon, was found to be inadequate against heavy Allied tanks like the British Mk II Matilda and the French Char B1 and Somua S35, although it was effective against the most common light tanks of the era, such as the French R35 which represented the majority of the armoured vehicles during the Battle of France.

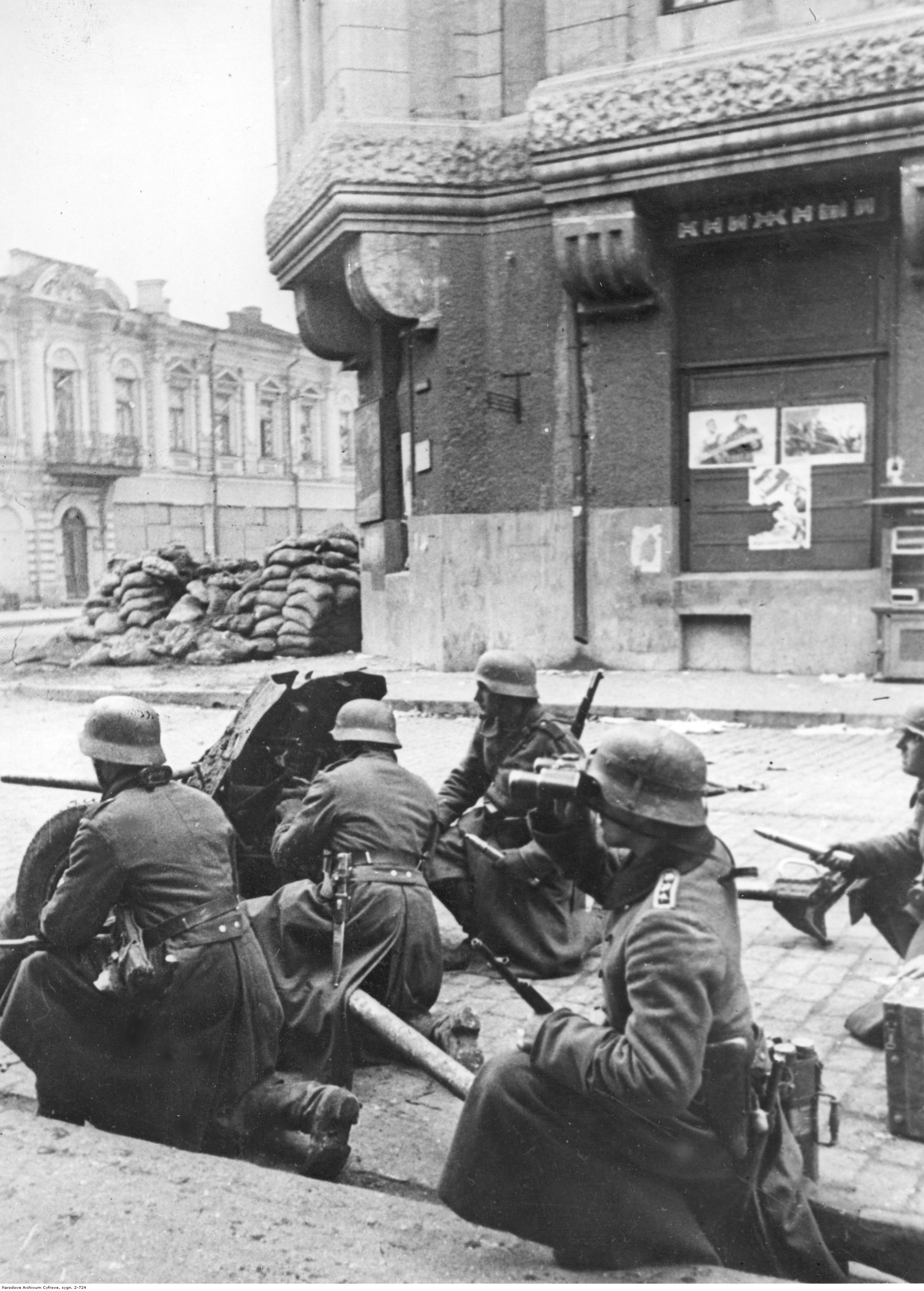
Five German soldiers of the 89th Infantry Regiment with a 3.7 cm Pak 36 anti-tank gun on a Kharkov street during the First Battle of Kharkov in October 1941. A sandbag barricade is visible in the background.

In June 1941, Soviet tank forces consisted of 10,661 T-26, 2,987 T-37/T-38/T-40/T-50s, 59 T-35, 442 T-28, 7,659 BT, 957 T-34, and 530 KVs for a combined total of approximately 23,295 tanks. Thus, during the initial phases of Operation Barbarossa, the Pak 36 could still penetrate the armour of the majority of Soviet AFVs at ranges up to 1000 m from the front, with the notable exception of the T-28s and T-35s, which it could penetrate only at under 100 m; the Pak 36 could not penetrate the relatively thick armour of the T-34s and KV-1s. By late 1941, the widespread introduction of the T-34 on the Eastern Front made the Pak 36 obsolete, considering its poor performance against it. This led to the Pak 36 being nicknamed "Heeresanklopfgerät" (lit. 'army door-knocking device') by German anti-tank crews for its inability to affect the T-34 aside from notifying its presence by futilely bouncing rounds off its armour, regardless of the angle or distance.

The addition of tungsten-core shells (Pzgr. 40) slightly improved the armour penetration of the Pak 36, finally enabling it to damage the T-34, but only by a direct shot to the rear or side armour from point-blank range – an unlikely and dangerous scenario. However, despite its continued impotence against the T-34, it remained the standard anti-tank weapon for many units until 1942. The advantages of the Pak 36 were its relative ease of handling and mobility (it could be brought into action very rapidly by as few as two men since it weighed only 432 kg); good quality optics/aiming devices; ease of concealment due to its small size; and high rate of fire.

The Pak 36 began to be replaced by the new 5 cm Pak 38 in mid-1941. As it was gradually replaced, many were removed from their carriages and added to Sd.Kfz. 251 halftracks for use as light anti-armour support. The guns were also passed off to the forces of Germany's allies fighting on the Eastern Front, such as the 3rd and 4th Romanian Army. This proved particularly disastrous during the Soviet encirclement (Operation Uranus) at the Battle of Stalingrad when the Romanian forces, already demoralized and understrength, bore the brunt of the main Soviet armored thrust and were unable to stop the Soviet advances due to their grossly inadequate anti-tank weaponry. The Pak 36 also served with the armies of Italy, Finland, Hungary, and Slovakia.

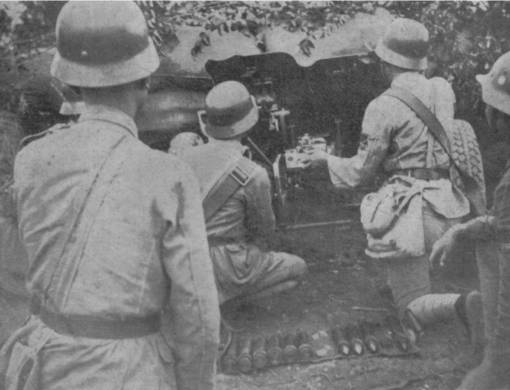
Stahlhelm-wearing Chinese soldiers deploying a Pak 36.

Although the Pak 36 quickly became ineffectual in the European and Russian theatres, in China the gun was still viable as an effective anti-tank gun. It could destroy the Japanese Type 95 Ha-Go and Type 97 Chi-Ha tanks, since their armour protection was quite weak. For example, during the Battle of Taierzhuang, Chinese Pak 36s destroyed a good number of Japanese tanks.

== 3.7 cm Pak 36 L/45 ammunition ==
PzGr

- Projectile weight: 0.685 kg
- Muzzle velocity: 745 m/s

PzGr 40

This was a type of tungsten-core ammunition, being lighter and with a higher muzzle velocity, produced in small quantities.

- Projectile weight: 0.368 kg
- Muzzle velocity: 1,020 m/s

Hit probability versus 2.5 m x 2 m target
Range	Penetration	in training	in combat
100 m	64 mm	100%	100%
500 m	31 mm	100%	100%
1000 m	22 mm	100%	85%
1500 m	20 mm	95%	61%
2000 m	mm	85%	43%

Penetration figures given for Pzgr 40 and an armoured plate 30 degrees from the horizontal.

Revised penetration statistics due to HE burster size, projectile weight, and possible decreases of early war metal quality.
Ammunition type	Muzzle velocity	Penetration										
Ammunition type	Muzzle velocity	100 m	250 m	500 m	750 m	1000 m	1250 m	1500 m	1750 m	2000 m	2500 m	3,000 m (9,800 ft)
Pzgr. APHE	745 m/s	49 mm (1.9 in)	45 mm (1.8 in)	40 mm (1.6 in)	35 mm (1.4 in)	30 mm (1.2 in)	27 mm (1.1 in)	23 mm (0.91 in)	20 mm (0.79 in)	18 mm (0.71 in)	14 mm (0.55 in)	11 mm (0.43 in)

=== Stielgranate 41 ===
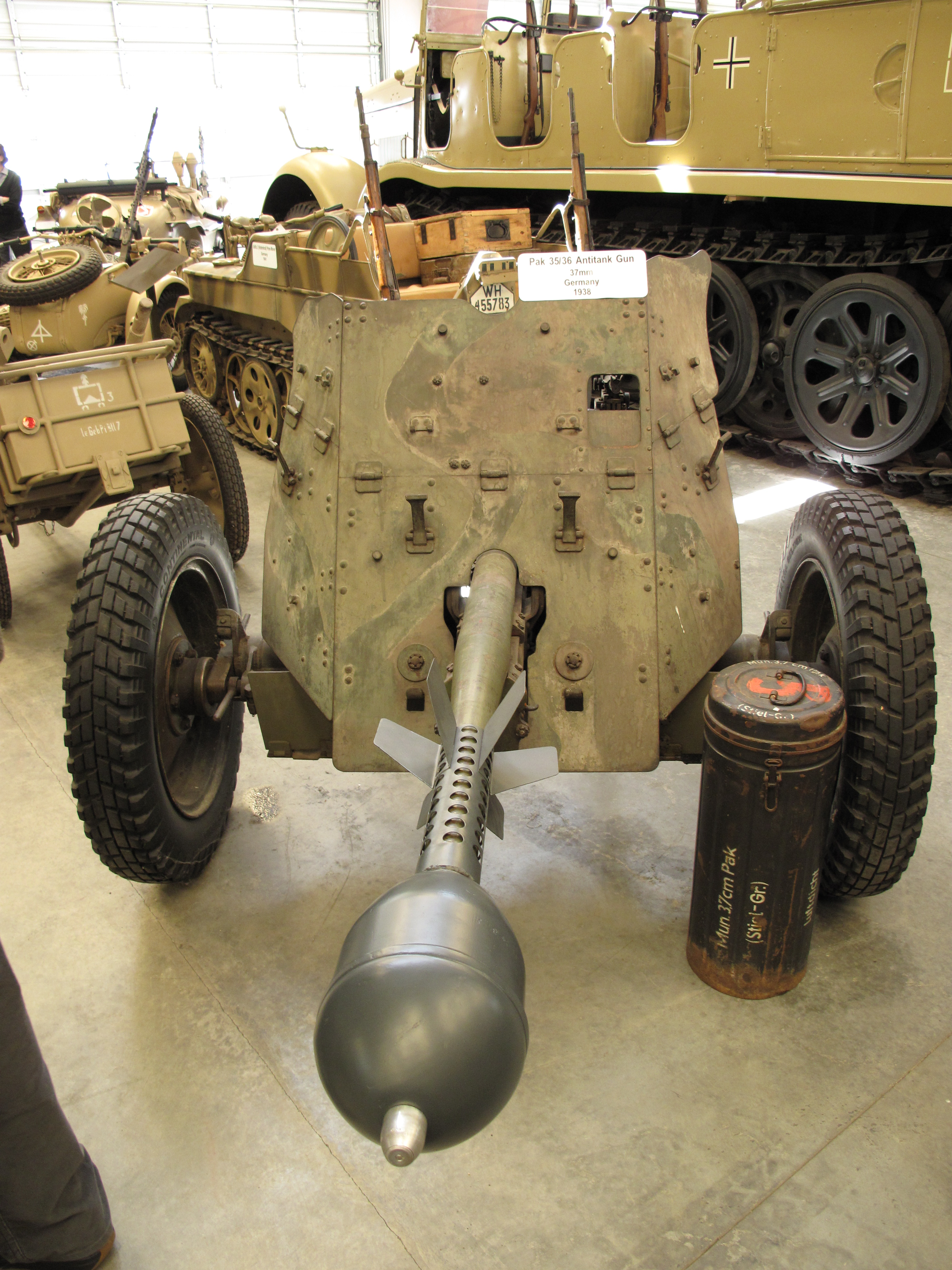
Pak 36 with Stielgranate 41, as used in the late stages of World War II.

In February 1942, the introduction of the Stielgranate 41 shaped charge meant that the Pak 36 could now penetrate most armour, although the low velocity of the projectile limited its range. The Pak 36s, together with the new shaped charges, were issued to Fallschirmjäger units and other lightly equipped troops. The gun's low weight meant that it could be easily moved by hand, and this mobility made it ideal for their purpose.

== Variants ==
- 4 cm 40.M – This was a Hungarian design, and was the standard Hungarian light anti-tank gun. It was effectively a Pak 36 but rebarrelled to 40 mm calibre. This could fire the same ammunition as the Bofors 40 mm anti-aircraft gun, and also had a version of Stielgranate ammunition made for it. A modified version of this gun became the main gun of the 40M Turán I Hungarian medium tank.
- 37 mm anti-tank gun M1930 (1-K) – This was a Soviet anti-tank gun designed by Rheinmetall and produced under license, which was very similar to the Pak 35/36, but lacking some improvements. Guns captured by Germany were given the designation 3.7 cm Pak 158(r).
- Type 97 37 mm – This was a Japanese anti-tank gun designed by Rheinmetall and produced under license, which was similar to the Pak 35/36.
- Cannone controcarro da 37/45 – Italy purchased from Germany 40 Pak 35/36 guns during the Spanish civil war and more during World war II. The guns captured by Germany after the Italian defeat were given the designation 3.7 cm Pak 162(i).
- The Netherlands were also a user of the Pak 35/36. Guns captured by Germany were given the designation 3.7 cm Pak 153(h).

== Operators ==
- Ethiopia – Received 12 guns before the Italian invasion
- Republic of China
- Estonia
- Finland – 37 PstK/37 and 37 PstK/40
- Germany
- Greece
- Guatemala – Delivered by Czechoslovakia in May 1953
- Hungary
- Italy - designated as Cannone controcarro da 37/45
- Italy
- Japan – Produced under license as the 37mm Type 97 gun
- Netherlands
- Romania
- Slovakia
- Soviet Union – Produced under license
- Sweden – 305 guns purchased, used as 37 mm pvkan m/39 (L45), m/39-40 (L50), m/39-43 (L45, 37mmx257R) and m/40-43 (L50, 37mmx257R)
- Turkey

== Guns of similar performance and era ==
- 37 mm Gun M3 – a US 37 mm anti-tank gun of similar performance.
- Bofors 37 mm – a Swedish 37 mm anti-tank gun of similar performance.
- Škoda vz. 34 – a Czech 37 mm anti-tank gun of similar performance.
- Škoda vz. 37 – a Czech 37 mm anti-tank gun of similar performance.
- Type 94 37 mm – a Japanese 37 mm anti-tank gun of similar performance.
