= Yechiel Lerer =

Yiddish poet

Yechiel Lerer (1910–1943) was a Yiddish poet.

Lerer lived in the Warsaw Ghetto and participated in the ghetto literary activity. He was involved in the periodical Hamadrikh (Hebrew: "The Guide"). Yechiel was murdered in the Treblinka extermination camp.
