= Yechiel Granatstein =

Polish-born Jewish author and writer (1913–2008)

- יחיאל גראנאטשטיין
- Born: June 6, 1913; Lublin, Poland
- Died: February 7, 2008 (aged 94); Israel
- Citizenship: Israel
- Occupations: Novelist; biographer; short story writer
- Writing career
- Language: Yiddish, Hebrew
- Notable works: The War of a Jewish Partisan; One Jew's Power, One Jew's Glory

Yechiel Granatstein (Hebrew: יחיאל גראנאטשטיין; June 6, 1913 – February 7, 2008) was a Polish-born Jewish author and writer in Yiddish and Hebrew, as well as a partisan fighter in World War II and a Jewish refugee activist following the Holocaust.

== Life ==
Yechiel Granatstein was born in Lublin, Poland on June 6, 1913. Even before World War II, he had developed his skills as a writer, writing for Dos Yiddish Tagblat and various Agudah periodicals. While still young and single, he was drafted into the Polish army for military training. He lived in Łódź from 1936 to 1939. Following the Nazi–Soviet invasion of Poland at the outbreak of World War II he escaped from the Germans to Slonim, which was on the Russian side of the Molotov–Ribbentrop line, eventually entrapped in the Słonim Ghetto after Operation Barbarossa.

In 1942 he escaped to the nearby forests and joined the partisans who were fighting the Nazis. He was accepted into the partisan unit because of his earlier training as a soldier and because he possessed an automatic machine gun. After the war he returned to Łódź where he assisted refugees in leaving Europe from his base at 66 Wschodnia Street and then continued his refugee rescue work in Paris from 1946 to 1950. It was in Paris in 1950 that he published an autobiography of his time fighting as a Jewish partisan under the title "I Wanted to Live" ("Ich hob gevolt lebn" in Yiddish), which detailed the dangers he faced not just from the German Nazis, but from his fellow Russian partisans as well. This book was translated into Hebrew and into English under the title "The War of a Jewish Partisan". He immigrated to Israel in the 1950s where he continued to write about pre-war Europe and the Holocaust. In Israel he wrote for "Shearim", "Hamodia", "HaTzofe" and other newspapers and journals. He also wrote a biography about his father-in-law's, the Radoschitzer Rebbe's, experiences in the ghettos and concentration camps. He died on February 7, 2008, in Israel.

== Published works ==
- איך האָב געוואָלט לעבן (I Want to Live) (א"ב צעראטא, Paris, 1950)
  - Translated to Hebrew by Naftoli Ginton and published as יהודי ביער (A Jew in the Forest) (מורשת, Tel Aviv, 1955)
  - Translated to Hebrew by the author as יהודי ביער: קורותיו של פרטיזן יהודי (A Jew in the Forest: The Experiences of a Jewish Partisan) (מאור, Tel Aviv, 1983)
  - Translated to English by Charles Wengrov as The War of a Jewish Partisan: A Youth Imperiled by his Russian Comrades and Nazi Conquerors (Mesorah, Brooklyn, 1986, ISBN 0-89906-477-9)
- אורות מאופל (Blackened Lights) (קרית ספר, Jerusalem, 1958)
- לכסיקון הגבורה (with משה כהנוביץ) (Yad Vashem, Jerusalem, 1965–1968)
- שמש בענן (Sun in the Cloud) (Mossad Harav Kook, Jerusalem, 1975)
- פרעמדע וועלדער - אייגענע ערד (Strange Forest - Familiar Land) (פארלאג י"ל פרץ, Tel Aviv, 1979)
- שלכת באביב: סיפורים קצרים (Autumn in the Spring: Short Stories) (סיפן, Jerusalem, 1980)
- תלמידי הבעל-שם-טוב בארץ ישראל: למעלה ממאתיים שנה לעליית תלמידיהם של הבעש"ט ושל המגיד ממזריץ לארץ ישראל (The Students of the Baal Shem Tov in Israel) (מאור, Tel Aviv, 1982)
- ארץ-ישראל של מעלה: עלייתם של גדולי ישראל לארץ ישראל (Heavenly Land of Israel: The Ascent of Sages of Israel to the Land of Israel) (פאר, Tel Aviv, 1985)
- השביל והדרך: על הצדיק רבי שמואל מקוריב, מהחבריא הקדושה של הרב ר' אלימלך מליזנסק וה"חוזה" מלובלין ועל תלמידיו (The Path and the Road: About the Tzadik Rabbi Shmuel from Koriv) (פאר, Bnei Brak, 1986)
- הוד וגבורה: האדמו״ר מראדושיץ בפיוטרקוב רבי יצחק שמואל אליהו פינקלר הי״ד, חייו וקורותיו בגיטו ובמחנותf (מכון זכר נפתלי, Jerusalem, 1987)
  - Translated to English by Charles Wengrov as One Jew's Power One Jew's Glory: The Life of Rav Yitzchak Shmuel Eliyahu Finkler, the Rebbe of Radoschitz, in the Ghetto and Concentration Camps (Feldheim Publishers, 1991, ISBN 978-0873065597)
- הגבורה האחרת : היהודי הדתי במאבק גבורה ובמרי נגד גזירות הנאצים בשנות השואה (ירושלים : מכון זכר נפתלי, תשמ"ט 1989)
- חיים כפולים (ירושלים : פאר, תשנ"א 1991)
- מגע בנפש (ירושלים : פאר, תשנ"ד 1993) <רומן>
- הולכי נתיבות (ירושלים : פאר, תשנ"ה 1995)
- ימי בראשית : סיפורה המופלא של ההחייאה הרוחנית-אמונתית-דתית למחרת השואה ע"י קומץ ניצולים חרדיים (בני ברק, תשנ"ז 1996)
- שם נפשו בחיים (בני ברק : פאר, תשנ"ח 1998)
