= Panzer I variants =

Variants of German light tank

The Panzerkampfwagen I (PzKpfW I) was a light tank produced in Germany in the 1930s. The Panzer I was built in several variants and was the basis for a number of variants listed below.

== Designations ==
Panzerkampfwagen I Ausf.A ohne Aufbau
Krupp Traktor LaS
(LaS - Landwirtschaftlicher Schlepper) English: Agricultural tractor Tracked training vehicles.
Panzerkampfwagen I Ausf.A
LaS (Vs.Kfz.617), MG Panzerwagen (Vs.Kfz.617), (Sd.Kfz.101)
Panzerkampfwagen I Ausf.B
LaS Maybach, (Sd.Kfz.101)
Panzerkampfwagen I Ausf.B ohne Aufbau
Instandsetzungskraftwagen I
Utility / recovery and repair vehicle
Panzerjäger I
4,7cm KPÚV vz. 38 antitank gun on a converted Pz.Kpfw.I Ausf.B chassis.
Panzerkampfwagen I Ausf.F
Panzerkampfwagen I nA Verstärkt, VK1801, VK1802
30 built by Krauss-Maffei in 1942.

Panzerkampfwagen I Ausf.C

VK 6.01, 40 built by Krauss-Maffei in 1942.

15cm sIG33(Sf) auf Pz.Kpfw.I Ausf.B
Sturmpanzer I, Bison
15 cm sIG 33 heavy infantry gun on Pz.Kpfw.I Ausf.B chassis.
Kleiner Panzerbefehlswagen
kl.Pz.Bef.Wg., (Sd.Kfz.265)
Command vehicle based on Ausf.A chassis.
Ladungsleger auf Panzerkampfwagen I Ausf.B
prototype demolition charge carrier based on the Ausf.B
Abwurfvorrichtung auf Panzerkampfwagen I Ausf.B
production demolition charge carrier based on the Ausf.B
Brückenleger auf Fgst Pz.Kpfw.I Ausf.A
based on Ausf.A chassis.
Flammenwerfer auf Panzerkampfwagen I Ausf.A
A field modification in North Africa ca. 1941, based on Ausf.A chassis.
Flammenwerfer auf Panzerkampfwagen I Ausf B
A field modification in Spain ca. 1936–9, based on Ausf.B chassis.
Munitionsschlepper auf Pz.Kpfw.I Ausf.A
Gerät 35 (Sd.Kfz.111)
Ammunition carrier based on Ausf.A chassis.
Munitionsschlepper auf Pz.Kpfw.Ia
Munitionsschlepper auf Pz.Kpfw.Ib
Fahrschulwanne
Ausf.A ohne Aufbau used for driver training.

== Glossary ==
- Sd.Kfz. - Sonderkraftfahrzeug - Special vehicle
- Pz.Sp.Wg. - Panzerspähwagen – Reconnaissance tank/vehicle
- VK - Vs.Kfz - Versuchskampffahrzeug – Research/experimental fighting vehicle
- Ausf. - Ausführung - Mark or sub-type
- Pz.Kpfw. - Panzerkampfwagen – Tank
- (Sf) - Selbstfahrlafette – Self-propelled
- PaK – Panzerabwehrkanone – Anti-tank gun
- LeFh - Leichte Feldhaubitze – Light Field Howitzer
- Gefechts Aufklärer - Combat reconnaissance
- (Flamm) – Flammenwerfer – Flame-thrower
- verstärkt – Strengthened / improved / upgraded
- Fahrgestell – Chassis
- Gerät – Apparatus
- ohne Aufbau – without superstructure / turret
- Bergepanzerwagen – Armoured recovery vehicle
- Brückenleger – Bridge-layer
- LaS - Landwirtschaftlicher Schlepper - Agricultural tractor
- Flakpanzer - Anti-aircraft artillery tank
- Munitionsschlepper - ammunition carrier
- Fahrschulwanne- Driving school hull
- Panzerbefehlswagen - Command tank
- Sturmpanzer - Infantry support artillery tank
- MG Panzerwagen - Machine gun combat vehicle
- nA - neuer Art - New type

== Panzer I light tanks ==
Panzerkampfwagen I Ausf A

Originally known as MG Panzerwagen (V Kfz 617) and given the Sonderkraftfahrzeug designation Sd.Kfz.101, the Ausf A was armed with two machine guns in a small turret. The 450 production tanks were in service from 1934 to 1941, last seeing action in Finland.

Panzerkampfwagen I Ausf B

After initial service the Ausf A was found to be underpowered and the engine prone to overheating. A more powerful engine was fitted and the superstructure transferred to the longer chassis of the kl Pz Bef Wg to produce the Ausf B, a.k.a. LaS Maybach, seeing service from 1935 to 1943, latterly as a command tank.

Panzerkampfwagen I Ausf C

The Ausf C light tracked reconnaissance vehicle, a.k.a. PzKpfW I nA or VK601, was a comprehensive re-design of the Pz I, with little commonality with earlier Ausfuhrungen introducing the Schachtellaufwerk (inter-leaved track wheels) used in many later Panzers. One of the machine guns was replaced by a semi-automatic Einbauwaffe 141 anti-tank rifle chambered in 7.92×94mm Patronen, giving it limited anti-armor capability. Forty Ausf C were built, two being sent to the Eastern Front for evaluation, the remainder were in action during the Normandy invasion of 1944.

Panzerkampfwagen I Ausf. F

The Ausf F heavily armoured infantry assault tank (MG armed), a.k.a. PzKpfW I nA verstärkt or VK1801, was an up-armoured Pz I with the Schachtellaufwerk (inter-leaved track wheels) of the Ausf C, and a turret mounting two machine-guns. Thirty Ausf F tanks were built between April and December 1942, eight of which were sent to the Eastern Front for evaluation.

== Specialised vehicles ==
Panzerkampfwagen I Ausf A ohne Aufbau

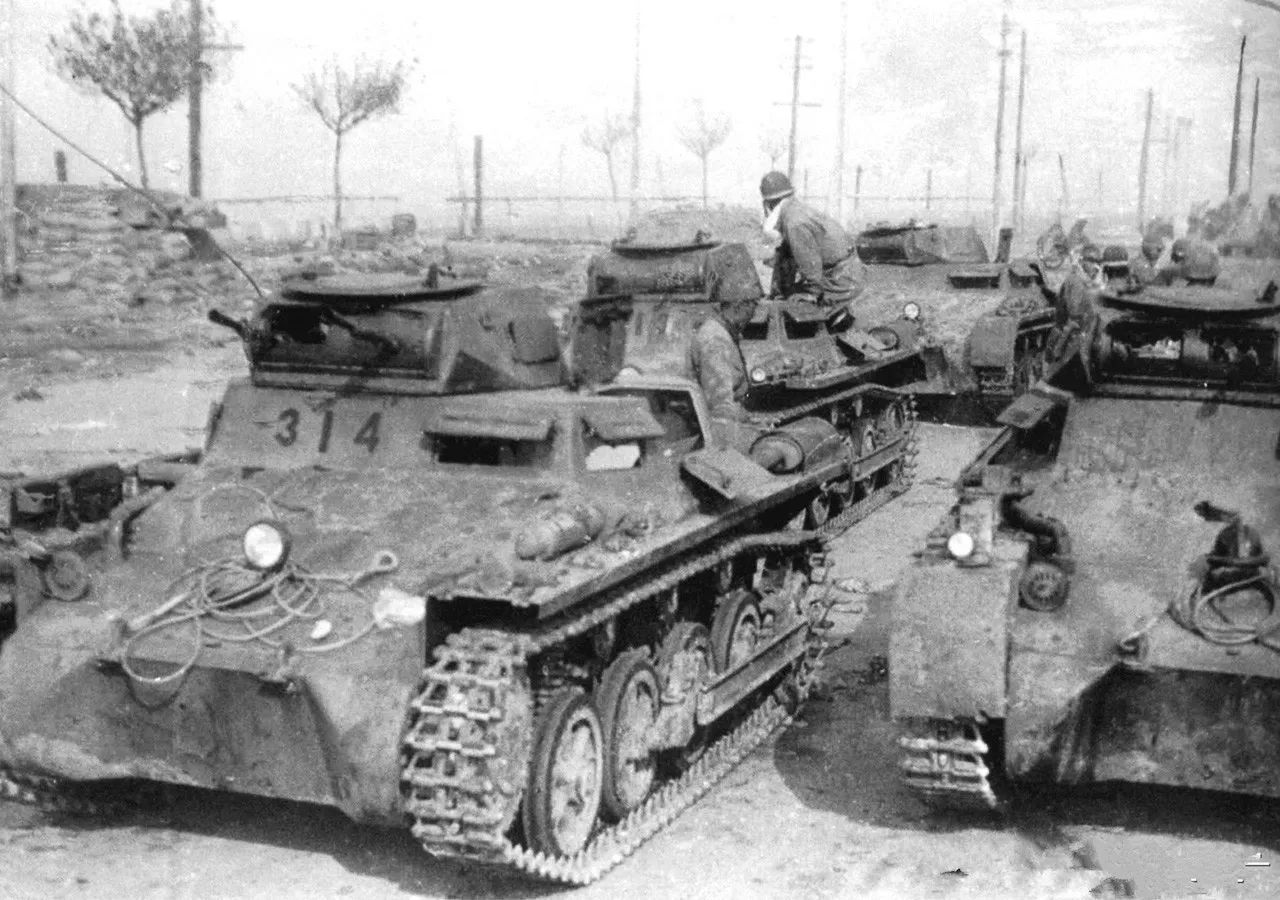
Japanese soldiers inspecting Panzer I Ausf. A tanks abandoned by the Nationalist Army after the Battle of Nanking, 1937.

The first Panzer I vehicles to be built, 15 of this variant were completed by various firms (Daimler-Benz, Henschel, Krupp, MAN, and Rheinmetall) in a program intended to develop industrial capacity and provide initial training vehicles to the Wehrmacht. The Ausf A ohne Aufbau was a Panzer I hull without any superstructure or turret. The interior was completely open. The vehicle was crewed by a student driver and instructor, with room for three student observers behind them. The suspension and hull were identical to the Ausf A, but total weight was reduced to 3.5 tons and height to 1.15 m. Performance was similar.

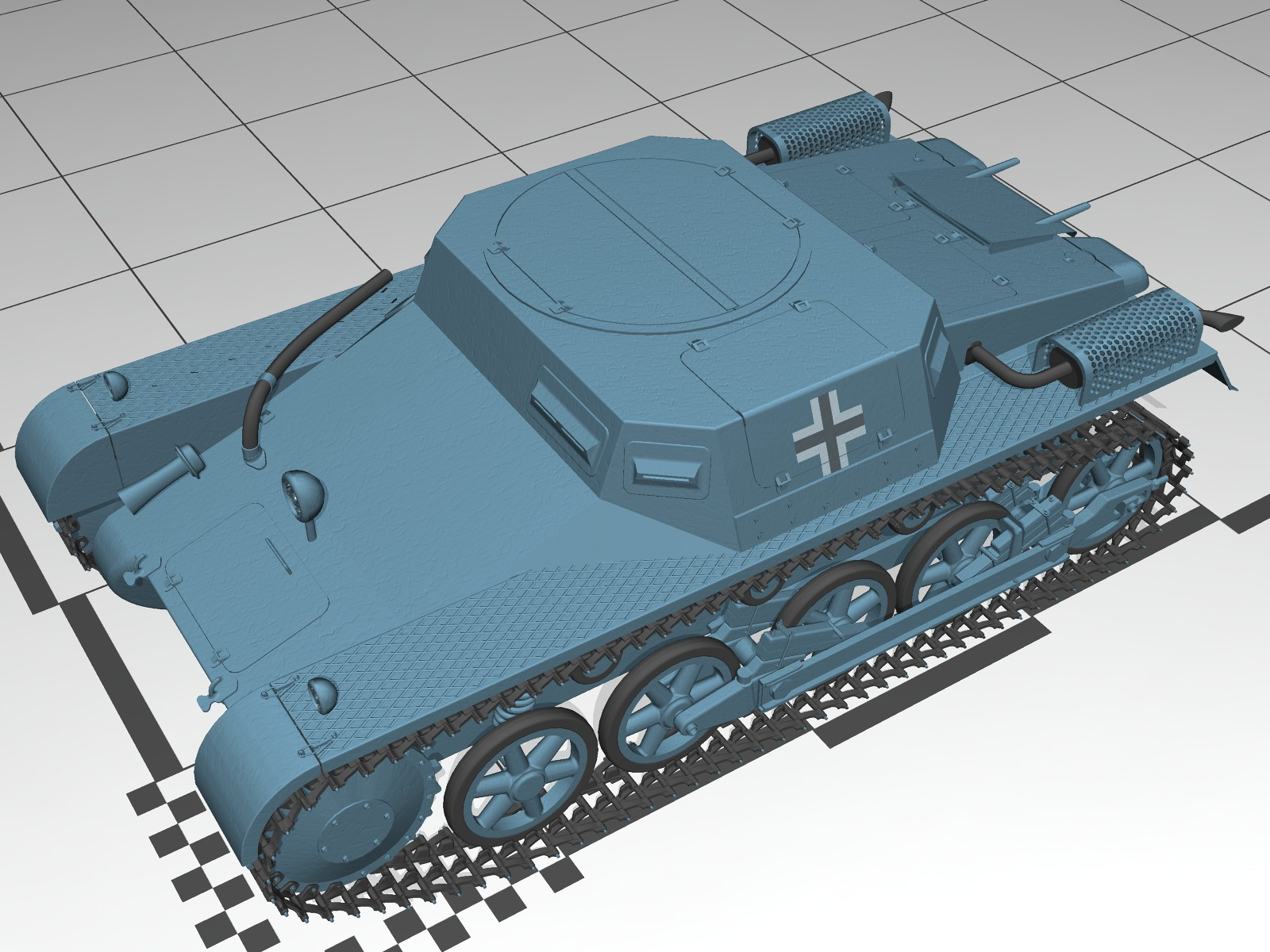
Munitionsschlepper on Panzer I Ausf A chassis

Munitionsschlepper auf Panzerkampfwagen I Ausf A

Given the designation Sd.Kfz. 111, the Munitionsschlepper (ammunition tractor) was built to provide Panzer units with an armored tracked vehicle for front-line re-supply of tanks. 51 examples were converted from older Ausf A tanks in September 1939. The conversion involved removing the turret and providing a two-piece armor plate cover over the resulting opening. This crude conversion served in Poland and France with Panzer units. Total weight was a little less than the Ausf A, at 5.0 tons, and the height was reduced to 1.4 m. Since some fuel capacity was removed, range was cut to 95 km. No armament was provided.

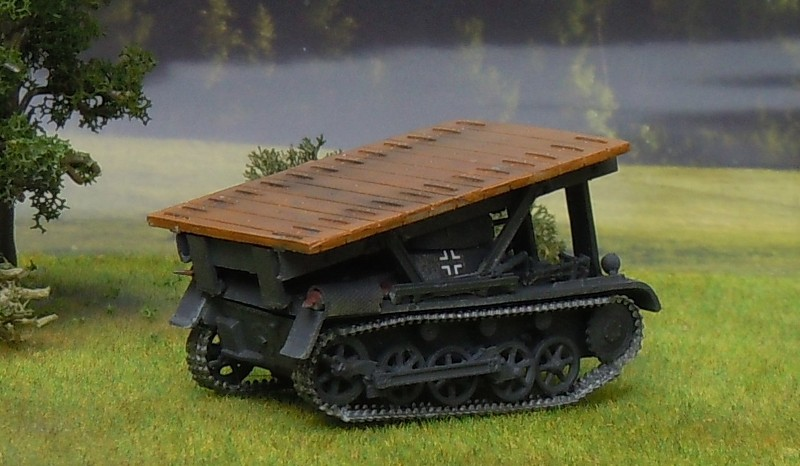
A Brückenleger I model

Brückenleger auf Fgst Panzerkampfwagen I Ausf A

An attempt to mount bridging equipment on the Ausf A chassis proved impractical due to the weak suspension of the vehicle, although this was later tried with greater success on the Panzer II chassis.

Flammenwerfer auf Panzerkampfwagen I Ausf A

A simple field modification, the Flammenwerfer had a portable flamethrower with enough fuel for about 10 seconds of firing at a range of up to 25 m mounted in place of one of the machine guns. The idea came from an experiment during the Spanish Civil War, and was intended to give the Panzer I more firepower against close targets. The conversion was not permanent, and was only reported to be used in the Battle of Tobruk by the German 5th Light Division.

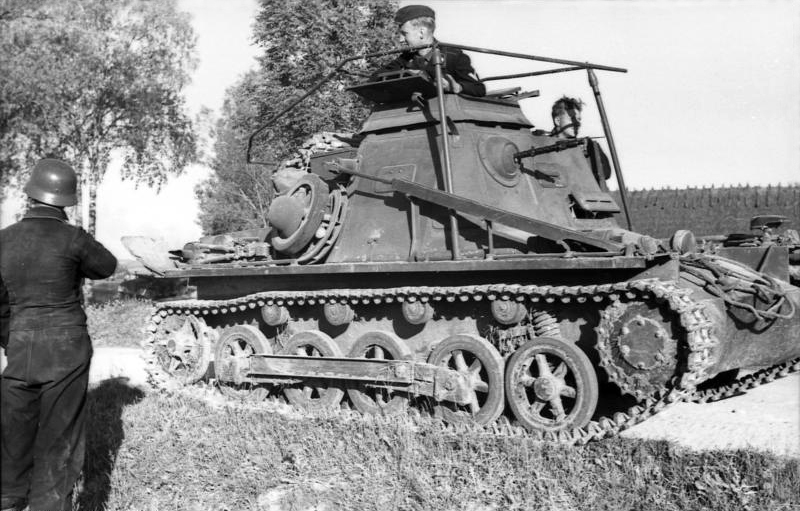
Panzerbefehlswagen on Panzer I Ausf. B chassis

Kleiner Panzerbefehlswagen (kl Pz Bef Wg)

Given the designation Sd.Kfz. 265, the kl Pz Bef Wg was a modification of the Ausf A designed to provide a command vehicle for Panzer units. This required lengthening the chassis (by adding a fifth road wheel) and upgrading the engine. Ultimately, this chassis would be the basis for the improved Ausf B version. The klPzBefWg had a built-up superstructure in place of the turret, affording more interior room for command equipment and a FuG6 radio in addition to the FuG2. A single MG13 or MG34 in a ball mount on the front of the superstructure was provided, although often removed. Slightly heavier (5.9 tons) and taller (1.99 m) than the Ausf B, the klPzBefWg served with all Panzer units into the early war years. It received an additional 15 mm of armor later, and was moved to auxiliary duties by 1942. 184 were built by Daimler-Benz at the same time as Ausf B production, and six examples were built from Ausf A tanks.

Panzerkampfwagen I Ausf B ohne Aufbau

The Ausf B ohne Aufbau used the same chassis as the Ausf B, but omitted the superstructure and turret. Designed to provide Panzer units with a tracked recovery and repair vehicle, 164 were produced alongside the standard Ausf B vehicles. However, the introduction of larger tanks meant it was unable to do recovery work, and by 1940 it was being transferred to training duties. Compared to the Ausf B, it was much lighter (4.0 tons) and shorter (1.35 m). Like the Ausf A ohne Aufbau, the compartment was open-topped; the hull was armored.

4.7 cm PaK (t) (Sf) auf Panzerkampfwagen I Ausf B

Commonly known as the Panzerjäger I, and as Sd.Kfz.101, this version marked Germany's first attempt at an armored tank destroyer. The turret was removed and a Czechoslovak 4,7cm KPÚV vz. 38 anti-tank gun (German designation "4.7 cm PaK (t)" ) with a tall wrap-around gun shield was installed. Made from 14.5 mm thick armor plate, the shield offered no protection to the rear or above. The gun was capable of 35° of traverse and elevation from −8° to +12°. 86 rounds were carried for the main gun. While performance was similar to the Ausf B, it was heavier at 6.4 tons and taller, 2.25 m, than the B.

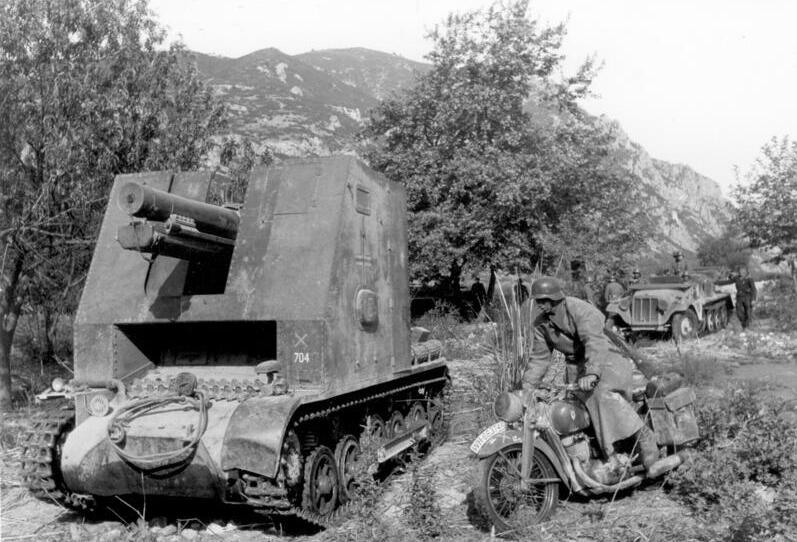
The self-propelled howitzer sIG 33 I (Sf) based on the chassis of the Pz.Kpfw. I Ausf. B light tank

15 cm sIG 33 (Sf) auf Panzerkampfwagen I Ausf B

This vehicle was sometimes known as the "Sturmpanzer I Bison". The larger Ausf B chassis made possible the mounting of heavier guns with removal of the turret. The largest was the 150 mm heavy infantry gun, the sIG 33. This mammoth piece was relatively short and barely fit inside a tall superstructure that was constructed up to the vehicle's 2.8 m (9 ft 2 in) height and over the tracks to their full 2.06 m (6 ft 9 in) width. The superstructure armor was light—only 13 mm—and only protected the front and sides. The heavy resulting weight of 8.5 tons overstressed the chassis; the vehicle was not a great success. 38 were converted from Ausf B tanks in February 1940. They served with six heavy SP infantry gun companies, with survivors in service into 1943. The sIG mounting was capable of 25 ° of traverse and 75 ° of elevation, and could be depressed to −4 °. It used a Rblf36 sight. Ammunition was carried separately, there being no room for onboard shell storage. The sIG would be mounted more successfully on larger chassis as the war progressed.

Flammenwerfer auf Panzerkampfwagen I Ausf A

A field modification, similar to that done to the Ausf B earlier in Spain, developed in preparation for the assault on Tobruk, by the 5th le division (5th Light Division) field engineers of the Deutsche Afrika Korps, and issued to the 5th Tank Regiment. the flamethrower was capable of 10-12 one-second bursts up to 25 m (82 ft).

Flammenwerfer auf Panzerkampfwagen I Ausf B

An experimental field modification similar to that done to the Ausf A later in North Africa, this conversion was made during the Spanish Civil War. There is no record of later use during World War II.

Ladungsleger auf Panzerkampfwagen I Ausf B / Abwurfvorrichtung auf Panzerkampfwagen I Ausf B

A field modification kit, the Ladungsleger and Abwurfvorrichtung, explosives layer, were mounted on the rear deck of an Ausf B tank and used to lay explosives to defeat field fortifications. A number of vehicles were given these kits, with authorized use on the armoured engineers company of each Pioneer Battalion.

Flakpanzer I (2 cm Flak 38 auf Pz.Kpfw.I Ausf.A)

An anti-aircraft conversion of Ausf.A tanks mounting a Flak 38 anti-aircraft cannon.

A rare modification that attempted to make the Panzer I into a self-propelled anti-aircraft gun by addition of a single 20mm anti-aircraft autocannon; it was not produced widely due to limited operational utility.

MG 151 variant

A nameless field modification consisting of a Panzer I ausf. B outfitted with a 1.5 or 2 cm MG 151 Drilling

7.5 cm variant

A nameless field conversion discovered after the war ended, with modified superstructure and a 7.5 cm StuK 40 L/48 gun mounted on it.

Spanish 20mm Breda variant

Panzer I ausf. A tanks in Spanish Nationalist service, rearmed with a 20 mm Breda cannon.
