= Awo =

Awo may refer to:

- Awo, Nigeria
- Babalawo
- Iyalawo

== See also ==
- AWO (disambiguation)
