= Oliver Mobisson =

Nigerian scientist, professor, activist, and entrepreneur (1943-2010)

Oliver Udemmadu Ogbonna Mobisson
- Born: April 23, 1943; Port Harcourt, Rivers State, Nigeria
- Died: February 18, 2010 (aged 66); Norwood, Massachusetts, United States
- Citizenship: Nigeria
- Education: St. Martins Primary School
- Occupation: Lecturer

Oliver Udemmadu Ogbonna Mobisson (April 23, 1943 – February 18, 2010) was a Nigerian scientist, professor, activist, and entrepreneur. He was also a founding Professor of the Anambra State University of Technology (now the Enugu State University of Science & Technology, Nnamdi Azikiwe University and Ebonyi State University).

== Early life ==
Mobisson was born in Port Harcourt, Rivers State, Nigeria. He grew up with his family in Umuezike, Edenta in Awo Idemili, Orsu L.G.A, Imo State, the son of a palm wine tapper. As a young boy, he attended St. Martins Primary School, Edenta Awo-Idemili (now known as Pioneer Primary School (P.P.S) Edenta Awo-Idemili) in Imo State and went on to the Christ the King College (CKC) in Onitsha. His excellence in academics caught the attention of local US Peace Corps volunteers who recommended that he pursue university studies in the United States or UK. He reluctantly agreed, having reservations about the role of the US and UK in colonial Africa. Ultimately, the Nigerian Ministry of Education granted him a fellowship to attend the Massachusetts Institute of Technology (MIT) in Cambridge, Massachusetts.

== College life and activism ==
Mobisson enrolled at MIT in 1965 just before the start of the Nigerian Civil War (1967-1970). Being of Igbo descent, the homeland of the Biafran movement, he had to choose between finishing his graduate school program or devoting himself to the Biafran movement. His studies gave way to organizing in the Boston Area a group of Biafran secessionists. Together, they funneled funds and resources to Biafran-based rebels and publicly protested in the US and other Western countries to recognize Biafra sovereignty. With his wife, Tama, he founded a humanitarian organization, Lifeline For Biafra. When the war ended in 1970, Mobisson remained in the US so he could learn the technical knowledge to rebuild Nigeria.

== Return to Nigeria & introduction of the ASUTECH computers ==
He decided to leave the US in 1981 when he was called upon by the late Professor Kenneth Dike to return to Nigeria and help found Africa's first computer technology university, Anambra State University of Science & Technology, ASUTECH. At ASUTECH, he served as head of the Industrial Development Centre (IDC). It was at IDC in 1983 that Mobisson introduced the first Black African commercially produced line of personal computers and servers, an effort described by then Head of State, Muhammadu Buhari as "blazing the trail for Nigeria’s quest for technological development". Commissioned by Governor Jim Nwobodo, Mobisson involved undergraduates at ASUTECH especially as employees in the development of the ASUTECH 800 and 8000 series of PCs.

== Later career ==
While teaching at ASUTECH, Mobisson went on to work in Nigerian telecommunications industry with NITEL. With the assistance of ASUTECH graduates, NITEL engineers, and former President Ibrahim Babangida's financial support, he constructed a communications system that was capable of connecting every Nigerian via telephones.

Mobisson was appointed a chief in Awo Idemili in 2005.

== Medical issues and death ==
Mobisson continued his work with NITEL until 1995, when he suffered a massive stroke which forced him into retirement. He lived in Norwood, Massachusetts until he died due to a heart attack on February 18, 2010.

== Personal life ==
He is the father of American hip hop recording artist Jidenna.
