= Obua =

Obua is both a given name and a surname. Notable people with the name include:

- Obua Ajukwu, Nigerian military leader
- Celestino Obua, Ugandan physician
- David Obua (born 1984), Ugandan footballer
- Denis Obua (footballer) (1947–2010), Ugandan footballer
- Denis Obua (politician) (born 1980), Ugandan politician
