= AWO =

AWO may refer to:

- Agricultural Workers Organization
- Air Warfare Officer, Singapore Air Force
- All Wrestling Organization, a wrestling organization in Israel
- American Waterways Operators
- Arlington Municipal Airport (Washington)
- Australian World Orchestra, symphony orchestra
- Awtowelo, a motorcycle made by East German company Simson

== See also ==
- Awo (disambiguation)
