= 7.92×94mm Patronen =

Anti-tank rifle cartridge

- Type: Anti-tank rifle cartridge
- Place of origin: Nazi Germany

Service history
- In service: 1939–1944
- Used by: Germany
- Wars: World War II

Production history
- Designer: Gustloff Werke
- Manufacturer: Gustloff Werke
- Produced: 1938–1942
- No. built: 9,417,400 (1939–1942)

Specifications
- Bullet diameter: 8.24 mm (0.324 in)
- Neck diameter: 9.32 mm (0.367 in)
- Shoulder diameter: 19.02 mm (0.749 in)
- Base diameter: 20.91 mm (0.823 in)
- Rim diameter: 20.94 mm (0.824 in)
- Case length: 94.4 mm (3.72 in)
- Overall length: 118 mm (4.6 in)

Ballistic performance
Bullet mass/type	Velocity	Energy
14.58 g (225 gr) APCR	1,210 m/s (4,000 ft/s)	10,584 J (7,806 ft⋅lbf)
- Test barrel length: 1085mm (42.7 in); Source: An Introduction To Anti-Tank Rifle Cartridges

The 7.92×94mm is an anti-tank cartridge originally developed for the Panzerbüchse 38. As the war progressed, the round became obsolete against all but lightly armored vehicles.

== History ==
The 13.2 mm TuF made its first appearance in 1917 along with the Mauser 1918 T-Gewehr due to the new British Mark IV tank first appearing on the battlefield which by then the 7.92 mm K bullet, was no longer effective against. All German weaponry development came to a sudden halt after the defeat of the German Empire in 1918, and no further development took place due to the limitations imposed by the Treaty of Versailles.

Development resumed in the late 1930s when the Panzerbüchse 38 came around after the need to provide infantry with a man-portable anti tank weapon. The 7.92×94 mm round was then developed by Gustloff Werke for use as ammunition in the Panzerbüchse 39.

As the war progressed, the round became ineffective against all but lightly armored vehicles. The round ended production in August 1942, and the Panzerbüchse 39 was phased out in 1944, effectively ending the service life of the round.

== Details of the round ==
The round originally had a steel core and a tiny capsule of tear gas. The round was to penetrate the armor of the tank and the tear gas to force out the occupants of the vehicle. The idea was impractical due to the core penetrating the armor and leaving the capsule outside. Later bullets used tungsten cores due to its better penetrating power. The round also had a metal jacket. The official designation of the round was Patrone 318 SmK-Rs-L'spur or Patrone 318 SmKH-Rs-L'spur. SmK means "Spitzgeschoss mit Kern", which translates to "pointed bullet with core". (H) indicates the bullet has a tungsten-carbide core, (Rs) stands for "Reizstoff", which means tear gas, because the projectile contains a small capsule of tear gas. "L'spur" stands for "Leuchtspur", which translates to tracer, indicating the bullet has a small tracer in its rear.

== Firearms using this round ==
- Panzerbüchse 38 anti-tank rifle
- Panzerbüchse 39 anti-tank rifle
- Model SS41 Czechoslovak bullpup anti-tank rifle (PzB M.SS.41 / PzB-41(t))
- EW 141 semi-automatic anti-tank rifle, used on Panzer I Ausf. C light tank

== See also ==
- Boys Anti-Tank Rifle
- .55 Boys
- 7.92mm DS
