= Obua Ajukwu =

17th c. military leader

Obua Ajukwu was a military leader of Oguta, known as Ndanike (the ancestor of the Umundanike people). He owned many slaves who travelled around Igboland with him. His father Ajukwu led the Edo people from the Benin Empire through Sapele and Ekumeku to Ugwunta. In 1620 they settled between the people of Awo and Ohaji.

Ajukwu was eventually deported by the Royal Niger Company to Calabar in 1902. Although his family's influence may trace back to the 16th century, he lived during the late 19th century and early 20th century.

In the 1600s, the Benin Empire was invaded by the Portuguese and Italians who came from Ethiopia. This led to the movement of the Bini people, migrating down-west.

Obua Ajukwu would grow up to be the teacher of the man that became known as King Jaja of Opobo.
