= Panzer I Ausf. C =

German light tank

Panzerkampfwagen I Ausf. C
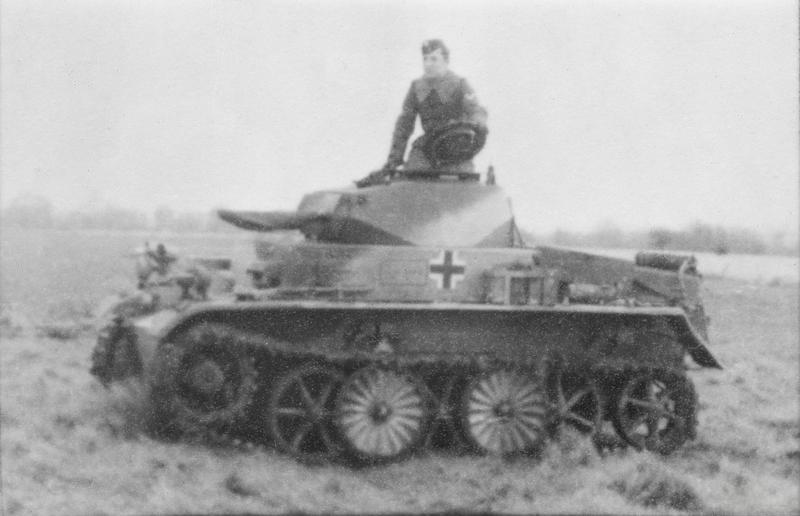
- Panzer I Ausf. C
- Type: Light tank
- Place of origin: Germany

Service history
- In service: 1943-1945
- Used by: Nazi Germany
- Wars: World War II

Production history
- Designed: 1939–1942
- Manufacturer: Krauss-Maffei and Daimler-Benz
- Produced: 1942
- No. built: 40

Specifications
- Mass: 8 tons
- Length: 4.19 m (13 ft 9 in)
- Width: 1.92 m (6 ft 4 in)
- Height: 1.94 m (6 ft 4 in)
- Crew: 2; commander and driver
- Armor: 10–30 mm (0.39–1.18 in)
- Main armament: 7.92mm Einbauwaffe 141 anti-tank rifle
- Engine: liquid cooled Maybach HL 45P 6-cylinder inline engine 150 hp (110 kW)
- Power/weight: 18.8
- Suspension: Individual torsion bar
- Operational range: 300 km (190 mi) on-road 110 km (68 mi) off-road.
- Maximum speed: 79 km/h (49 mph)

The Panzerkampfwagen I Ausf. C, also known by its prototype name VK 6.01 (Note: The designation meaning Vollketten ("fully tracked") 6-tonne class, prototype number 1), was a German light tank from the Second World War. Although the Panzer I Ausf. C was formally designated as a modification of the Panzer I, it was actually a completely new vehicle. This variant has little similarity with earlier Ausf. A and B variants - one of the main distinctions being the use of the Schachtellaufwerk inter-leaved track wheels which was used in many later German tanks during the war.

== History ==
Development of Panzer I Ausf. C was started in the autumn of 1939 by Krauss-Maffei and Daimler-Benz on the instructions of the Wehrmacht to create a light airborne tank. From July to December 1942, 40 Panzer I Ausf. C units were produced (serial numbers 150101 - 150140), including 6 prototypes. Two tanks were deployed to the Panzer I Division.

== Design ==
The chassis design was influenced by Krauss Maffei earlier work with halftracks including the 8-ton Sd.Kfz. 7 halftrack.

The turret armament was the Mauser E.W. 141 semi-automatic gun derived from the MG151 cannon and firing the 7.92 mm Patrone round as used in German anti-tank rifles such as the Panzerbüchse 38 and Panzerbüchse 39. The gun was unique to this tank, chosen as it could not carry a 20mm cannon. The gun could fire at up to 100 rounds per minute but lacked in penetration. Although this tank proved not to be effective against similar armored tanks, it was proven to be able to clear small arms and halt defending forces during Operation Barbarossa.
