= Panzerbüchse 39 =

German anti-tank rifle

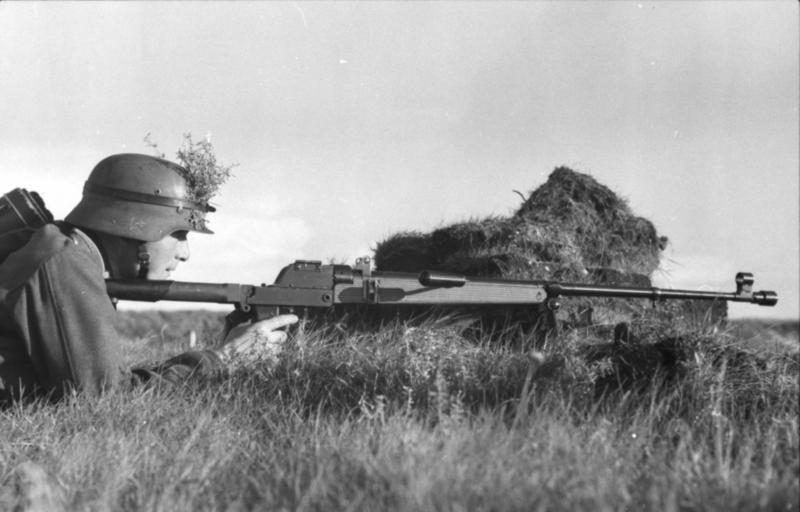
- A Wehrmacht soldier with PzB 39 in Northern France
- Type: Anti-tank rifle
- Place of origin: Nazi Germany

Service history
- In service: 1939–1945
- Used by: Nazi Germany
- Wars: World War II

Production history
- Designer: B. Brauer
- Designed: 1939
- Manufacturer: Gustloff Werke
- Produced: 1938–1941
- No. built: 1408 (PzB 38); 39,232 (PzB 39)
- Variants: Granatbüchse 39

Specifications
- Mass: 16.2 kg (35.71 lb) (PzB 38); 12.6 kg (27.78 lb) (PzB 39)
- Length: 1,620 / 1,280 mm (63.8 / 50.4 in) (folded for transport)
- Barrel length: 1,085 mm (42.7 in)
- Cartridge: 7.92×94mm Patronen
- Caliber: 7.92 mm
- Action: Falling-block action
- Rate of fire: 10 rounds/min (practical rate)
- Muzzle velocity: 1,210 metres per second (4,000 ft/s)
- Effective firing range: 300 m (330 yd) (for penetration of 25 mm armor)
- Feed system: Single shot
- Sights: Hooded front post, rear "V" notch

The Panzerbüchse 39, abbreviated PzB 39 (German: "tank hunting rifle model 39"), was a German anti-tank rifle used in World War II. It was an improvement of the Panzerbüchse 38 (PzB 38) rifle.

== Development ==
=== PzB 38 ===
German anti-tank rifles originated back in 1917 with the Mauser 1918 T-Gewehr, the world's first anti-tank rifle, using a special 13.2 mm (0.52 in) cartridge. It was created in response to the appearance of the first British tanks on the Western Front. That single shot manually operated rifle enjoyed moderate success; approximately 15,800 rifles were built.

German development resumed in the late 1930s. In an effort to provide infantry with a man-portable lightweight anti-tank rifle, Dipl.-Ing. (certified engineer) B. Brauer at Gustloff Werke in Suhl designed the Panzerbüchse 38 (PzB 38). It was a manually loaded single-shot weapon with a recoiling barrel, using a special 7.92 mm (0.311 in) cartridge. When fired, the barrel recoiled about 9 cm (3.5 in), which opened the breech and ejected the spent cartridge casing. The breech block was then arrested in the rear position, remaining opened for the gunner to manually insert a new cartridge. The gunner then released the cocked breech with a lever at the grip. The breech and barrel would then move forward again and the trigger was cocked in preparation to fire. This rather complicated mechanism was reportedly prone to jamming as the system got dirty in field use.

Although manufactured with pressed steel parts that were spot-welded, because of the complicated vertical breech block mechanism it was difficult to manufacture and only a small number of 1,408 PzB 38 rifles were built in 1939 and 1940 at the Gustloff Werke plant; 62 of these weapons were used by German troops in the invasion of Poland in 1939.

The rifle was 161.5 cm (5 ft 3.6 in) long - 129.5 cm (4 ft 3.0 in) folded for transport - and weighed 15.9 kg (35 lb). It used a specifically designed cartridge with a standard caliber of 7.9 mm, but a very large 94 mm long case (nominal 7.92×94mm). also known as the "7.92 x 94 Patronen".

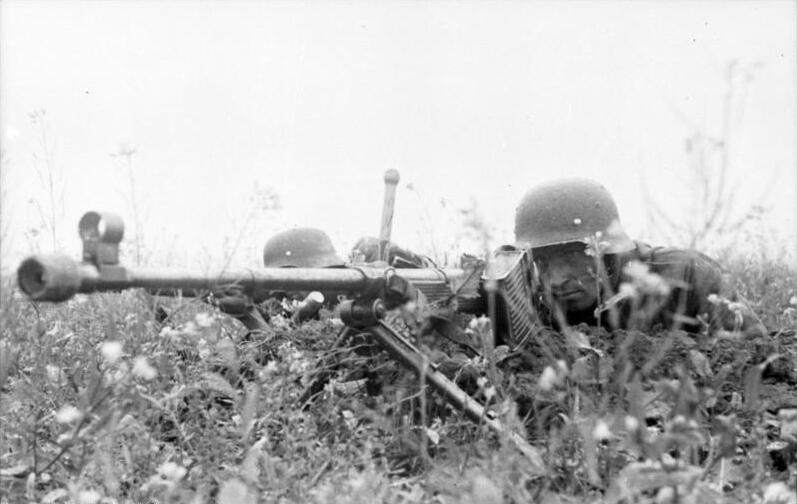
Dug in soldiers with the Panzerbüchse 39 deployed on the Eastern Front

=== PzB 39 ===
The next development, onto which production was immediately switched, was the Panzerbüchse 39 (PzB 39), an improvement made by Gustloff on their PzB 38. It also used a vertical breech block mechanism and the same cartridge as the PzB 38. It retained the barrel of the PzB 38 and had an only slightly increased overall length of 162.0 cm (5 ft 3.8 in); weight was reduced to 12.6 kg (28 lb). Performance was basically the same as that of the PzB 38. To increase the practical rate of fire, two cases each containing 10 rounds could be attached to the sides of the weapon near the breech - these were not magazines feeding the weapon, but merely put the cartridges closer to hand for the gunner. 568 PzB 39 were used by the German army in the invasion of Poland; two years later, at the beginning of Operation Barbarossa, 25,298 PzB 39 were in use by German troops. Total production from March 1940 to November 1941, when production ceased, was 39,232 rifles. The PzB 39 remained in use until 1944, by which time it had become hopelessly inadequate against all but the lightest armored vehicles.

== Variants ==
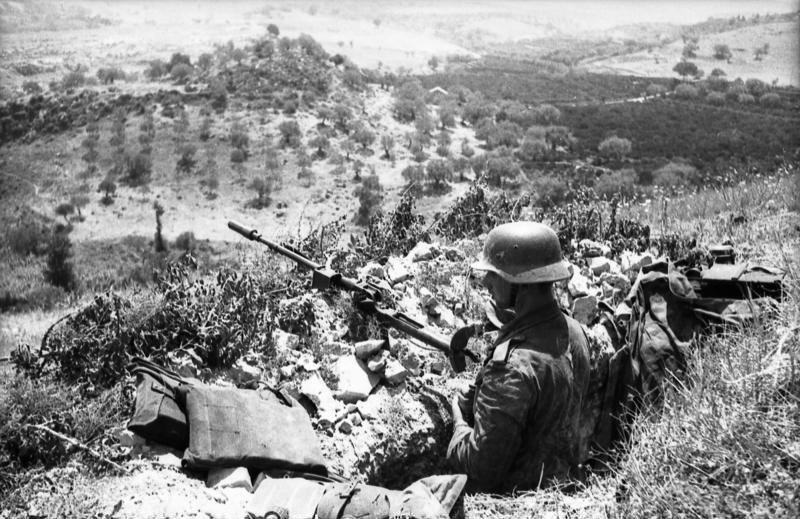
The short barrel and muzzle-mounted grenade launcher cup distinguish this Granatbüchse 39 grenade launcher version of the PzB 39 from the standard rifle

Starting in 1942, remaining PzB 39 rifles were rebuilt with a shortened barrel (590 mm) and an affixed Schiessbecher ("firing cup") attachment threaded to the barrel and used to launch standard rifle grenades. The cup was the standard type used with the ubiquitous Kar 98k infantry rifle and the ammunition was also interchangeable; there were three types of grenades: an anti-personnel grenade, a light anti-tank grenade and a large-diameter anti-tank grenade. The grenades were propelled by a special cartridge with a wood bullet. The rifle was also outfitted with a special sighting arrangement for firing up to 150 m and the wooden forend was removed. These converted rifles received the designation Granatbüchse Modell 39 (GrB 39) and remained in use until the end of the war.

== See also ==
- Anti-tank rifle
- Boys anti-tank rifle
- Lahti L-39
- Mauser 1918 T-Gewehr
- PTRD-41 ― Mass produced competing design to the PTRS
- PTRS-41 ― Mass produced competing design to the PTRD
- Solothurn S-18/100
- Type 97 automatic cannon
- Wz. 35 anti-tank rifle
