= Simson (company) =

German manufacturing company

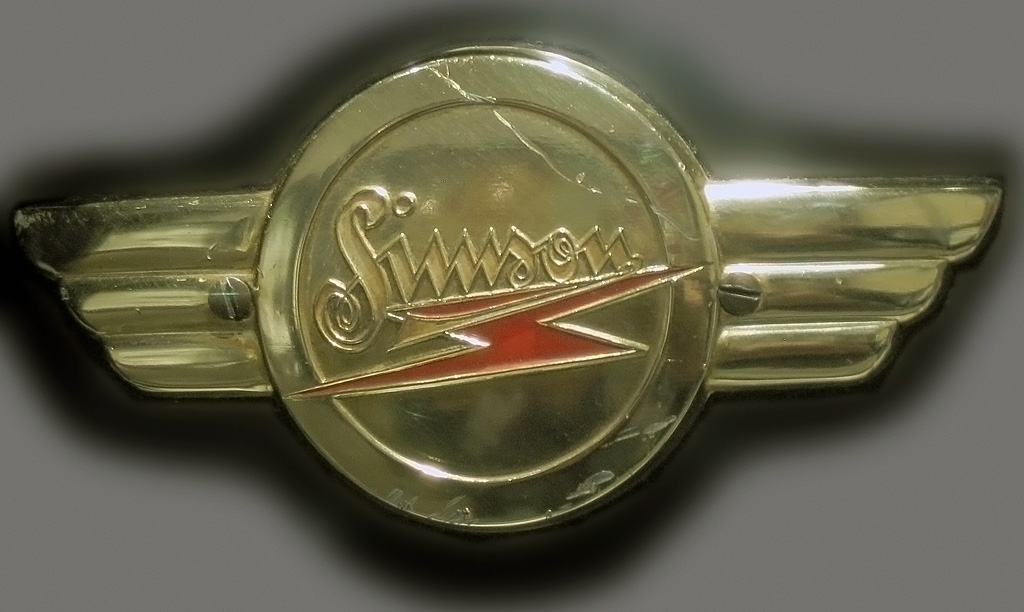
- Type: Manufacturing
- Traded as: Simson & Co. (1856–1938); Berlin Suhler Waffen- und Fahrzeugwerke (BSW) (1938–45); SAG Awtowelo (1947–52); VEB Fahrzeug-und Gerätewerk Simson Suhl (1952–68); VEB Fahrzeug- und Jagdwaffenwerk Ernst Thälmann Suhl (1968–90)
- Industry: Firearms, automobiles, motorcycles; mopeds
- Founded: 1885
- Defunct: 1 February 2003
- Fate: Bankrupt
- Headquarters: Suhl, Germany
- Key people: Löb and Moses Simson (Founder)
- Products: Mauser Gewehr 98 rifle, Simson Supra car, AWO/Simson 425 motorcycle, SR and KR series mopeds, etc.
- Parent: IFA (1948–90)

Simson was a German company which produced firearms, automobiles, bicycles and motorcycles, and mopeds. Under the Third Reich, the factory was taken from the Jewish Simson family, and was renamed several times under Nazi and later Communist control. The Simson name was reintroduced as a brand name for mopeds produced at the factory in the German Democratic Republic (GDR). Simson mopeds were then produced in Suhl until 2002.

== History ==
=== 1854–1933 ===
In 1854 the brothers Löb and Moses Simson bought one third of a steelhammer works in Suhl (Germany). The production of carbon steel began and the firm Simson & Co. was founded in 1856. The factory produced guns and gun barrels in the years following.

In 1871 the first steam engine started its service and the enterprise established production of bicycles in 1896, which was followed by the start of automobile production in 1907. The Simson Supra racing car is famous.

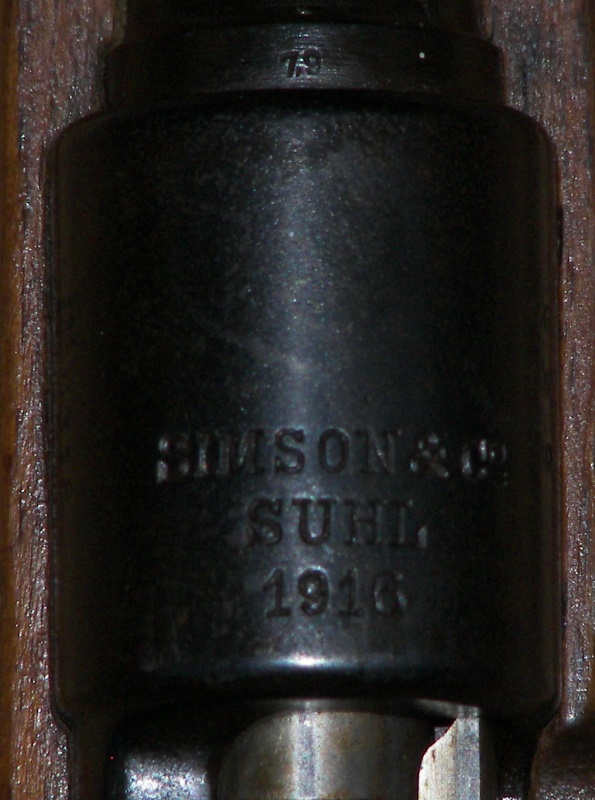
Receiver of a Gewehr 98 rifle made by Simson in 1916

Toggle of a Luger P08 pistol made by Simson

In World War I, Simson produced Mauser Gewehr 98 rifles for the German Army. In the aftermath of the war and the Treaty of Versailles, the reorganized Reichswehr was allowed to buy new handguns from only one company, so as to limit the ability of the German arms industry to recover. Larger manufacturers such as DWM were passed over in favor of Simson precisely because of its lower production capacity, and as such Simson was the sole producer of military-contract Luger P08 pistols from 1925 to 1934. Simson made about 12,000 Lugers in this period. Simson also was responsible for repairing and refurbishing existing firearms of the Reichswehr, though DWM was employed in the capacity as well, in contravention of the Treaty of Versailles. In addition to Lugers, Simson also repaired and refurbished Gewehr 98 and Karabiner 98b rifles, MG08 machine guns and MP18 submachine guns.

In the 1920s Simson also produced .25 ACP Westentaschenpistolen ("vest pocket pistols"), for commercial sale. Until 1989 this was Simson's only venture into commercial handgun production. These pistols were available in two almost identical models, the first known as Model 1 in German and Model 1922 in the United States, and the second as Model 2 in Germany and Model 1927 in the US.

Simson built cars from 1914 to 1915 and from 1919 until 1934. Its 1914 models had four-cylinder engines and were the 1.5 litre, 22 bhp model A and 2.6 litre, 28 bhp model C. In the First World War Simson stopped car production in 1915.

In 1919 Simson resumed car production with a new four-cylinder range: the 1.6 litre, 22 bhp model Bo, 1.6 litre; 40 bhp model Co and 3.5 litre, 45 bhp model D. Top speeds were 80 km/h (50 mph) for the Co and 90 km/h (56 mph) for the D. In 1923 Simson replaced the D with the 3.6 litre, 65 bhp model F, which was Simson's first 100 km/h (62 mph) production model.

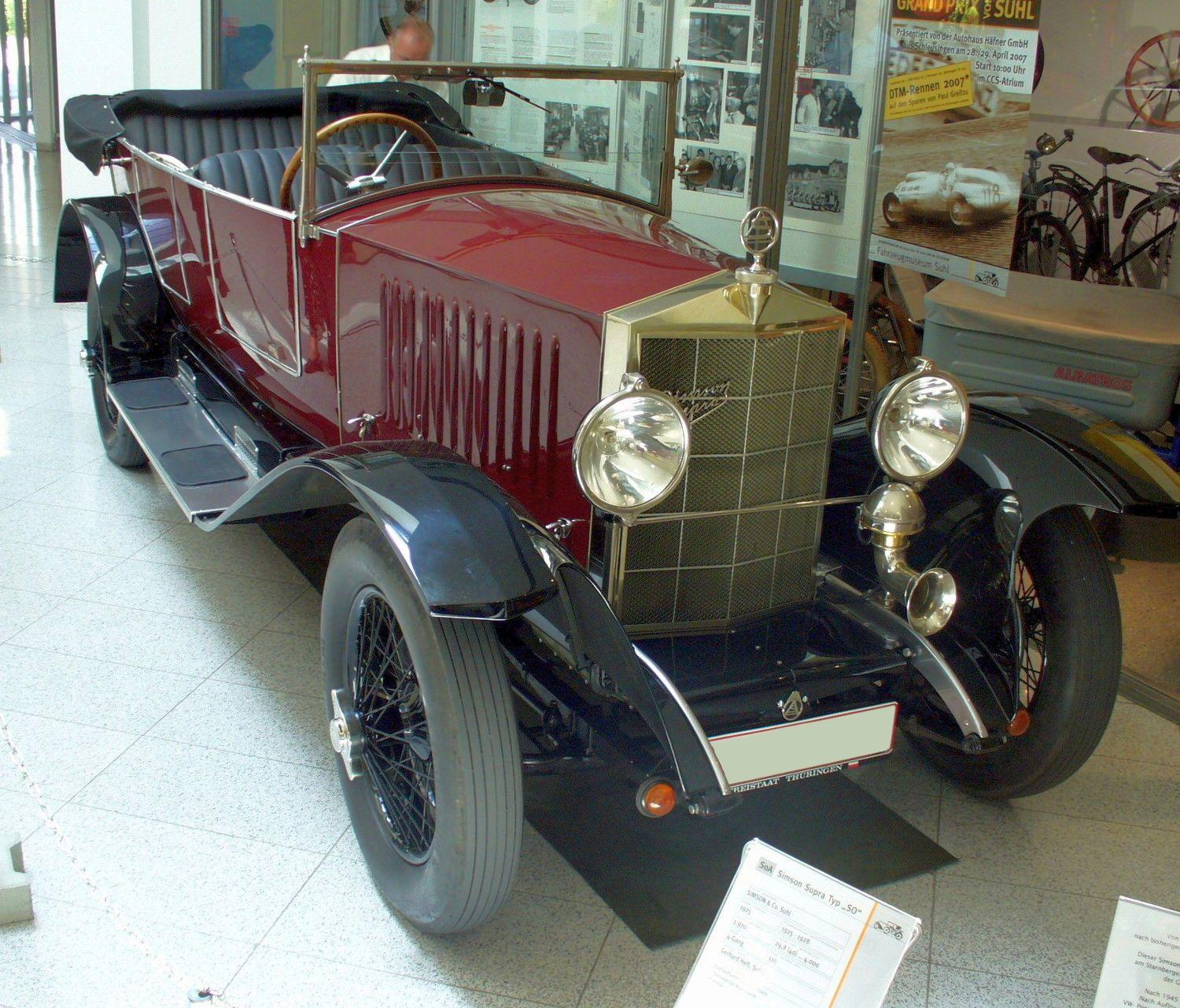
1925 Simson-Supra model So

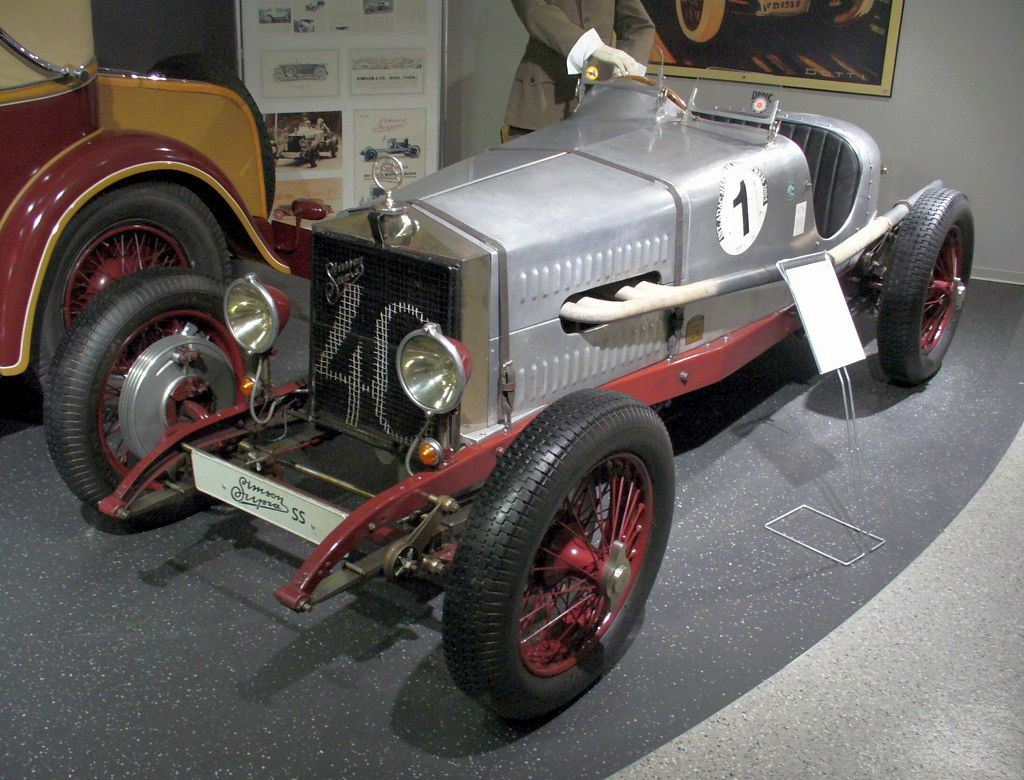
Simson-Supra SS racer

In 1924 completely revised its range of cars and gave them the Simson-Supra name. The hand-built models starting at that time and designed by Paul Henze were particularly noteworthy. The first Supra models were the S and the S Sport, which had a four-cylinder, two litre, long-stroke, DOHC engine. The S produced 50 bhp and had a 120 km/h (75 mph) top speed; the S Sport produced 60–80 bhp giving it a top speed of more than 140 km/h (87 mph). In 1925 a SOHC So version was introduced that produced 40 bhp and had a top speed of only 100 km/h (62 mph) The S and S Sport were discontinued in 1926; So production continued until 1929.

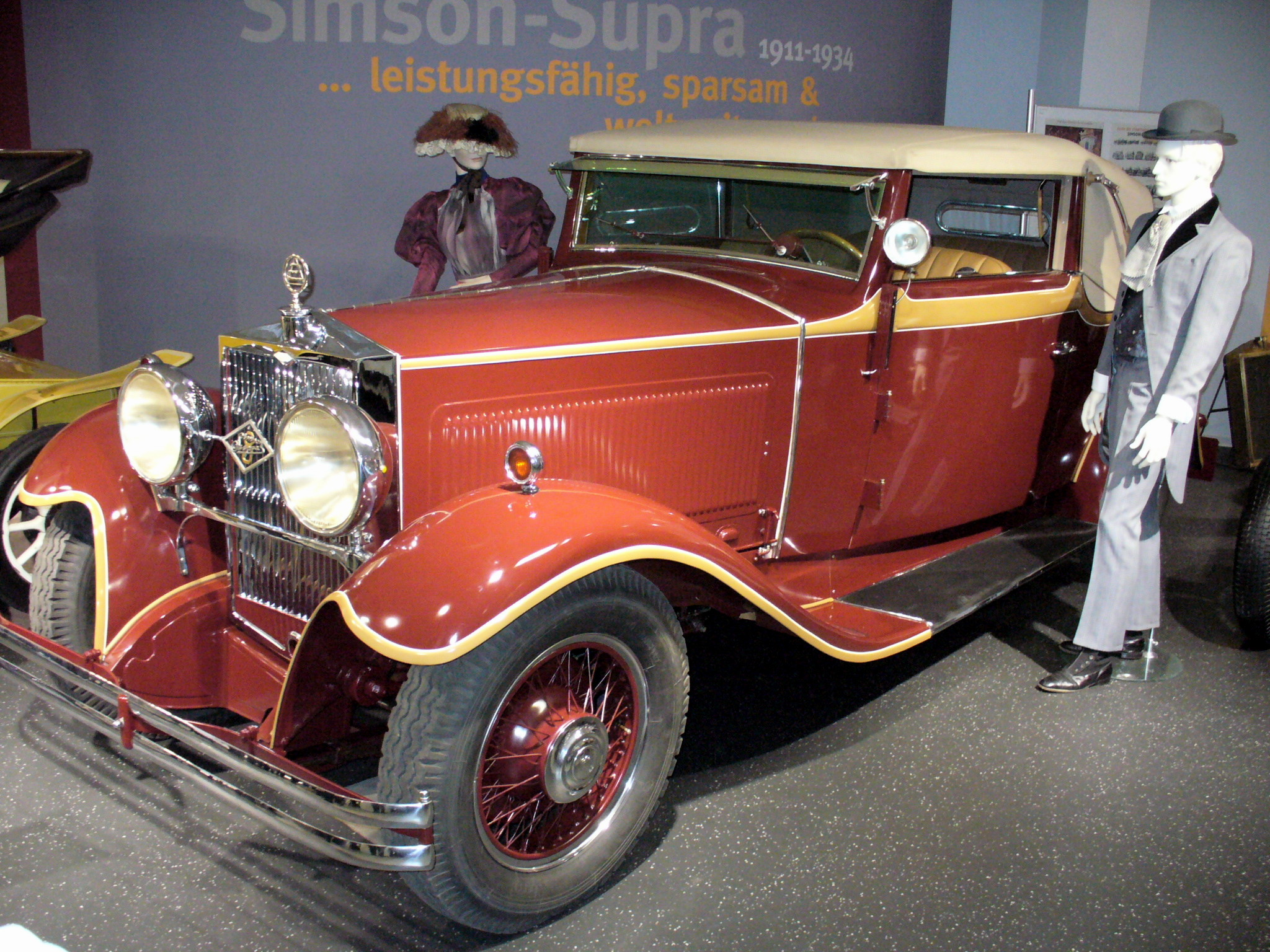
Simson-Supra eight-cylinder, 4.7-litre Model A in the Suhl vehicle museum

In 1925 Simson introduced its first six-cylinder car, the model J. Its SOHC, 3.1 litre engine produced 60 bhp, giving it a 95 km/h (59 mph) top speed. In 1926 this was succeeded by the model R, which produced similar performance with an OHV pushrod engine.

In 1931 the model J was succeeded by the model RJ, in which the six-cylinder engine had a larger bore giving it 3.3 litres displacement and 70 bhp. In the same year Simson introduced the first and only eight-cylinder Supra, the model A. Its engine shared the RJ's long-stroke dimensions of 79.5 x 115 mm, giving it 4.7 litres displacement. This produced 90 bhp and gave a 120 km/h (75 mph) top speed. Models RJ and A were produced until 1934.

From 1930 Simson also made prams.

=== 1934–48 ===
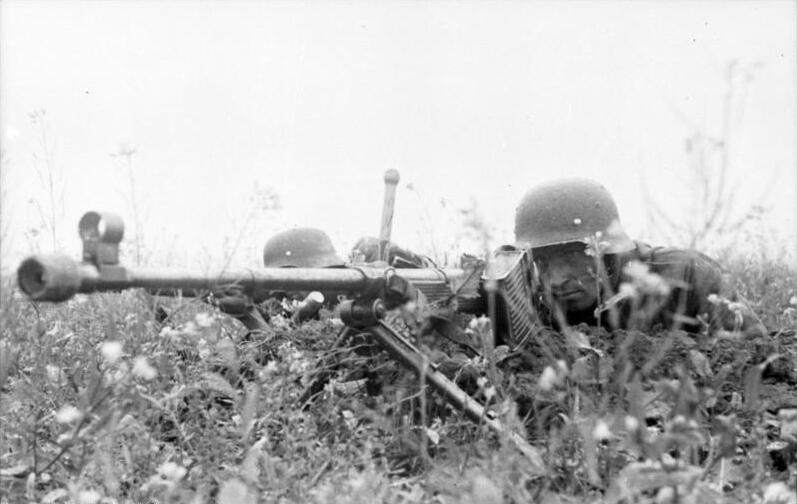
Panzerbüchse 39 in use on the Eastern Front, August 1941

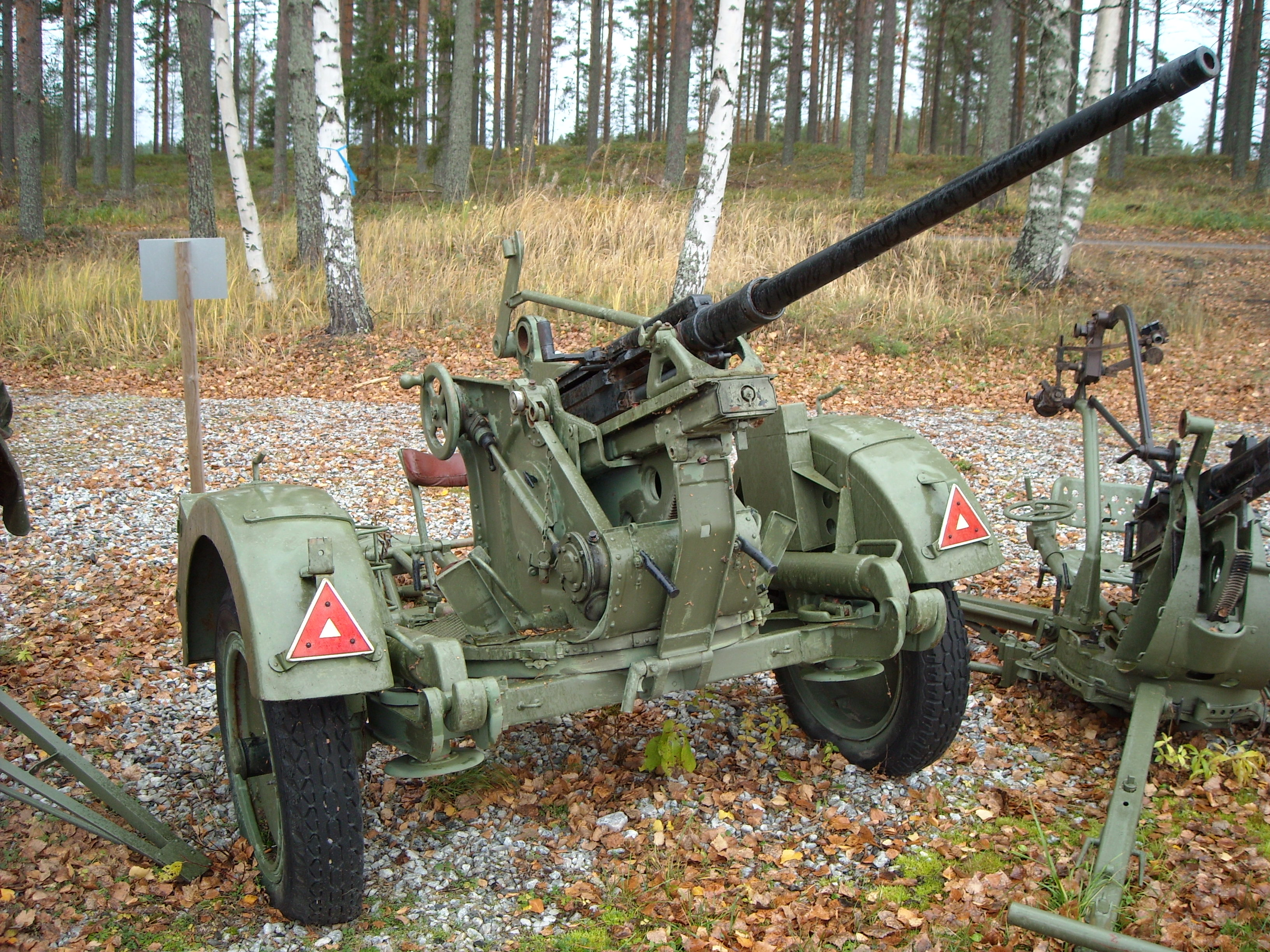
BSW 20mm anti-aircraft cannon

Hitler's government forced the Jewish Simson family to flee the country in 1936. Under the dispossession of Jewish industrialists (the so-called aryanization) a trustee took control of the firm, and so by merger with other factories the Berlin Suhler Waffen- und Fahrzeugwerke (BSW) was formed. In the same year the factory produced its first motorcycle, the BSW 98, which had a 98 cc engine and two-speed transmission. Critics of the Nazi government suggested a different meaning for the BSW initials: Bis Simson Wiederkommt ("until Simson returns").

After the Simson brothers were exiled the factory increased weapons production. From 1939 the company was called Gustloff-Werke – Waffenwerk Suhl, named after assassinated Swiss Nazi Wilhelm Gustloff, and had subsidiaries such as the Otto Eberhardt Patronenfabrik ("Otto Eberhardt Cartridge Factory"). As well as the main works in Suhl, the Gustloff-Werke had branch factories at Greiz in Thuringia and at Łódź in Nazi-occupied Poland. Sachs-engined motorcycles from 47 cc to 123 cc were made within the Gustloff group from about 1934 until about 1940.

Gustloff-Werke products included 7.92 mm calibre Panzerbüchse 39 anti-tank rifles, 7.92 mm calibre MG 42 machine guns, gun carriages for 20 mm calibre Flak 38 anti-aircraft guns, and various calibres of small arms ammunition. The firm continued to build bicycles, weapons and cars until 1945.

In 1946, by order of the Soviet Military Administration in Germany the manufacturing plant was partially dismantled and transported to the Soviet Union (USSR) as part of the Soviet reparations programme for the damage inflicted on the USSR by Germany in the Second World War. In 1947 the factory was integrated into the Soviet Sowjetische Aktiensgesellschaft Awtowelo (SAG Awtowelo or "Soviet Awtowelo Company Limited"). Автовело or Awtowelo is a Russian portmanteau word derived from автомобиль (avtomobil = "car") and велосипед (velociped = "bicycle"). It was adopted because initially all production was for export to the USSR.

=== 1949–62: four-stroke motorcycles ===
==== 250cc road models ====
Later, the USSR handed control of the factory to the German Democratic Republic (DDR) and in 1952 it was renamed Volkseigener Betrieb Fahrzeug- und Gerätewerk Simson Suhl. Production of sporting guns, prams and bicycles slowly resumed, but the main focus was again on making motorcycles.

Between 1949 and 1962 the Suhl factory produced more than 209,000 four-stroke motorcycles. They were designated 425, derived from the fact that they had a four-stroke engine with 250 cc displacement. The 425 has overhead valves in a V-formation, has a four-speed transmission, shaft final drive and has a duplex cradle frame. It earned a high reputation in the Eastern Bloc countries. The motorcycles were branded AWO (an abbreviation of Awtowelo) from 1949 until 1955, when the Simson name was revived. Some had Stoye sidecars fitted, and a Stoye Campi luggage trailer could also be fitted.

The original 425 model had plunger rear suspension, a 6.7:1 compression ratio, produced 12 bhp and had a top speed of 100 km/h (62 mph). It had 19 in (480 mm) wheels with half-width drum brakes. The first 1,000 machines were built from July 1949 until December 1950, and all were exported to the USSR. The model was released to the DDR domestic market in 1951. The plunger-framed model was designated AWO 425 from 1949 until 1955 and Simson 425 T from 1955 until 1960. The "T" stands for "Touring", to distinguish it from the Simson 425 S (Sport) model introduced in 1955. The plunger model was made from 1949 until 1960 and a total of 124,000 were built.

The 425 S had a twin-shock swinging arm rear suspension and a top speed of 110 km/h (68 mph). It had 18 in (460 mm) wheels with 180 mm (7.1 in) full-width drum brakes to give it better acceleration and braking than the plunger model. Initially the 425 S had 7.2:1 compression and produced 14 bhp; in 1961 this was increased to 8.3:1 which increased power output to 15.5 bhp. Simson made the 425 S from 1955 until 1962 and a total of 85,000 were built.

==== 250cc and 350cc competition models ====
Several competition versions of the 425 were built. In 1953 a racing version of the plunger-framed model was produced as the AWO 425 R. It was not offered for sale to the public and only 15 examples were built. Power output from the race-tuned version of the pushrod overhead valve engine was 24 bhp. A version with chain-driven double overhead camshafts appeared in 1955 and produced about 28 bhp. By 1958 Simson's racing team found it necessary to switch from shaft drive to chain drive, which meant that it had to develop a new engine as well. For the 1958 season the Simson single had a telescopic front fork and swingarm rear suspension.

Alongside the fast and proven single cylinder engine, Simson also developed a 250 cc parallel twin. It had long-stroke dimensions of 50.5 mm x 56 mm and produced more than 30 bhp at 10,000 rpm. Like the single, the twin's valves were in a V-formation and it had a six-speed transmission and chain final drive. The twin made its first appearance in 1958 with chain driven double overhead camshafts, but for the following season the engine was revised with shaft-driven overhead cams. Simson developed a new motorcycle frame for racing, with a leading link front suspension and long swingarm rear suspension. The twin proved to be fast but was plagued with teething troubles.

In road racing in the 1950s MZ won numerous international victories, but Simson's wins were confined to domestic competition. Simson won the DDR-Meisterschaft ("GDR Championship") in 1953, 1954 and 1955, but in 1958 the Allgemeiner Deutscher Motorsport Verband (ADMV, "General German Motorsport Federation") decided that in the 1959 season works riders would not be allowed to compete in the national championship. Simson therefore withdrew from road racing for 1959.

A Geländesport ("Enduro") version of the swinging-arm framed S model, the Simson 425 GS, was introduced in 1957. Production continued until 1959 and a total of about 80 examples were built. Simson developed a version of its single-cylinder engine enlarged to 350 cc for Enduro and Motocross competition. The enlarged GS engine produced such good performance that Simson decided to make it in larger numbers for competition machines to sell to club riders. In its first years of competition the GS suffered numerous competition defeats, but Simson systematically improved the reliability of its works competition machines. By the time Simson four-stroke production was ended at the end of 1961, the Simson works team had won competitions both in the DDR and abroad, and because of its competitiveness and reliability the GS model was used to equip the DDR's national Six Days Trial team.

==== 350cc road models ====
The Simson Eskorte was a limited-production model built in 1957 for the DDR's Ministerium des Innern (MDI or "Ministry of the Interior") and for the Volkspolizei. The Eskorte looks identical to the 425 S but has a 350 cc engine based on that of the GS. It produced 23 bhp, which gave a top speed of 130 km/h (81 mph). Only about 30 were built.

Production of the plunger-suspension 425 T model had ended in 1960, and in 1961 Simson planned a 20 bhp, 350 cc, swinging-arm model for the general market. The prototype had a partially enclosed rear wheel and two-tone paint scheme reminiscent of some Norton models of that time, and a handlebar cladding (a little like MZ models of the era) and a neat headlamp nacelle. It was equipped with integral indicators, which was a relatively advanced feature for European motorcycles in 1961. However, in the development phase of this model the DDR introduced a policy of Kapazitätsbündelung ("capacity concentration"), under which the production of larger motorcycles would be concentrated at the MZ works at Zschopau and from January 1962 all new private cars and motorcycles would be two-strokes. The DDR's Volkswirtschaftsrat ("People's Economic Council") terminated Simson four-stroke manufacture on 31 December 1961.

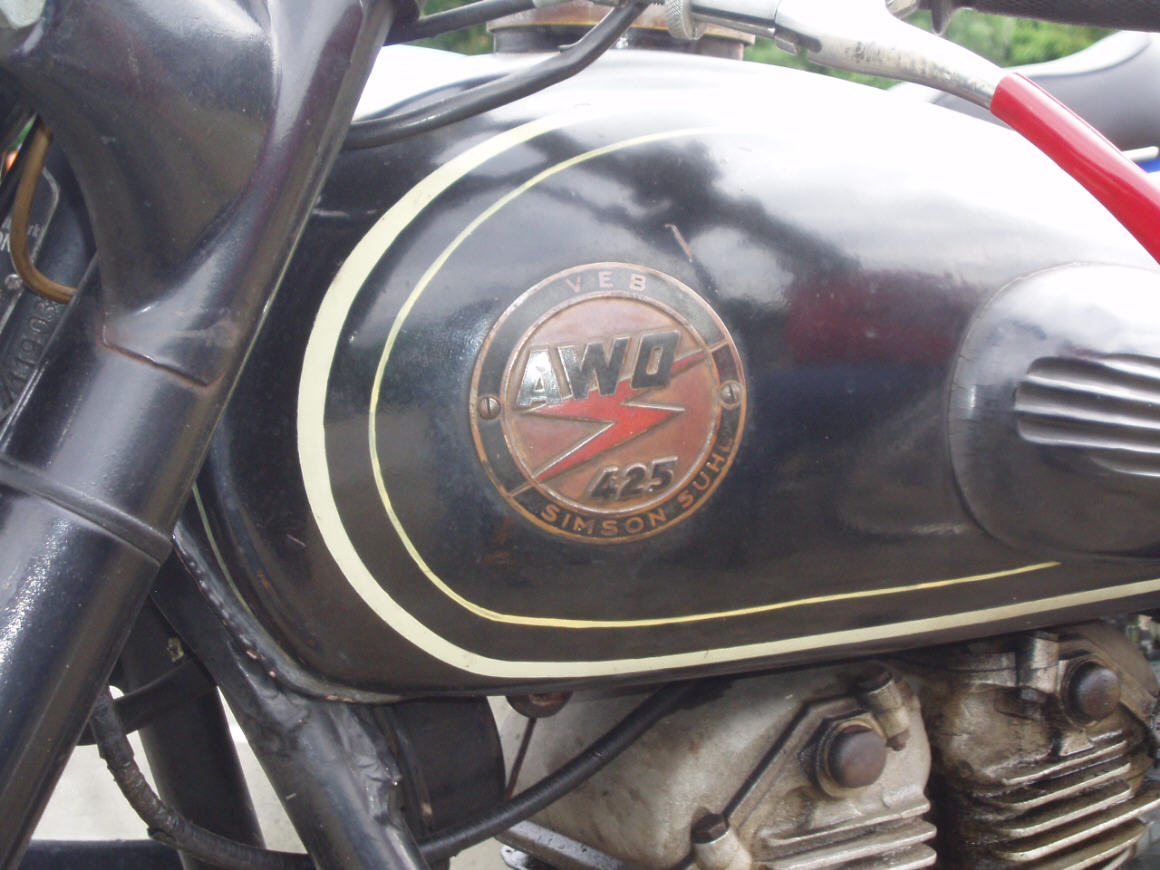
AWO 425 tank badge

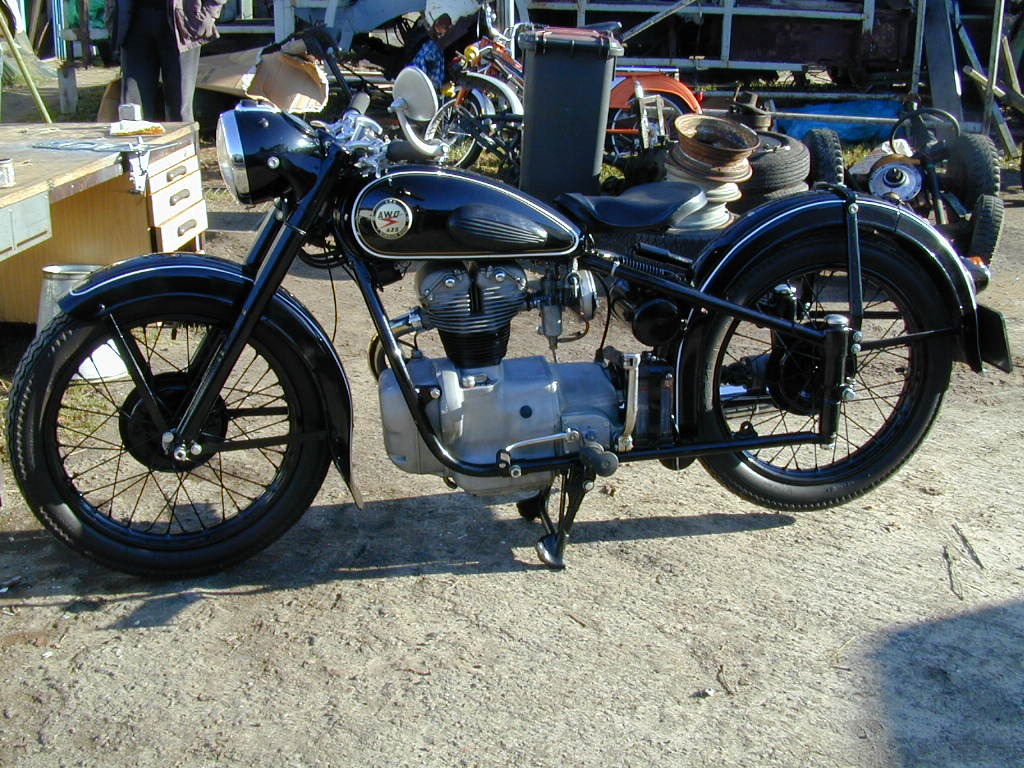
AWO 425

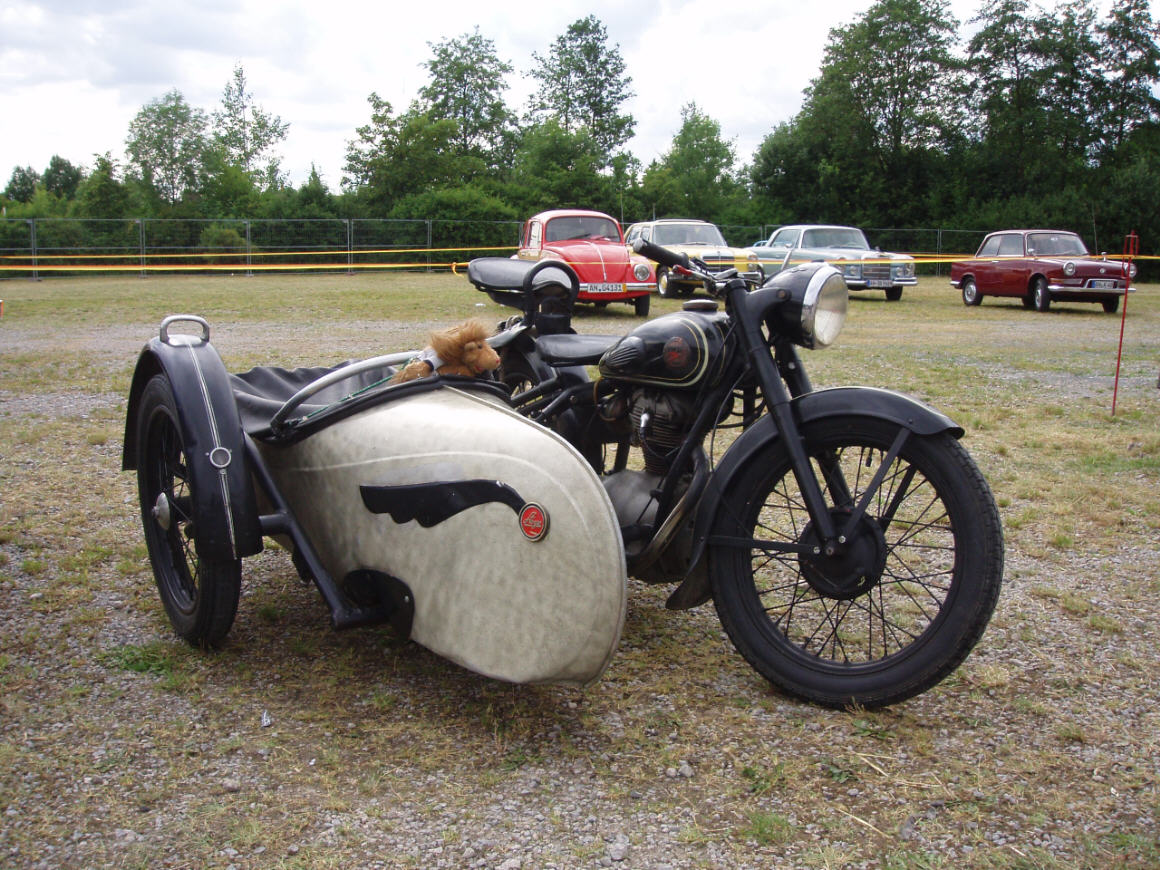
AWO 425 with Stoye sidecar

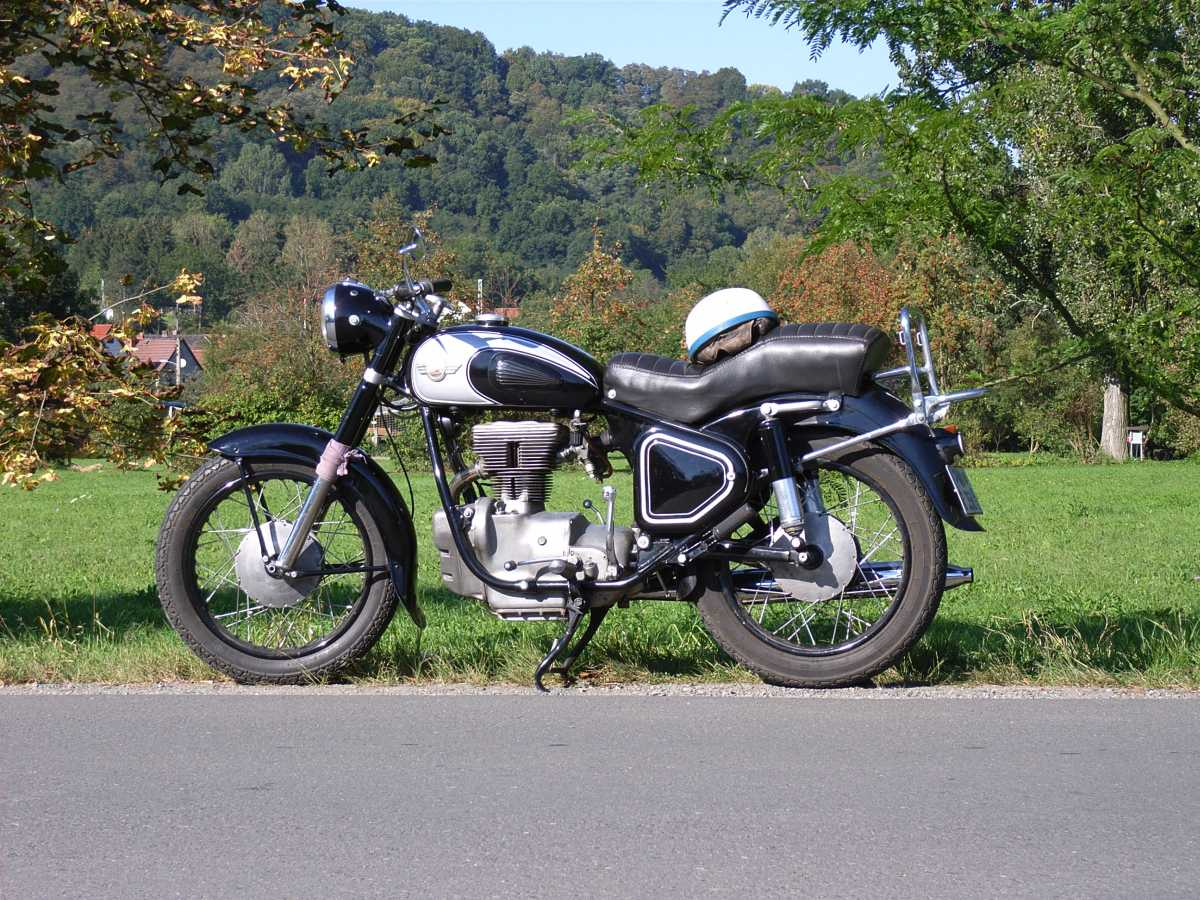
Simson 425 S

=== 1955–90: two-stroke motorcycles and mopeds ===
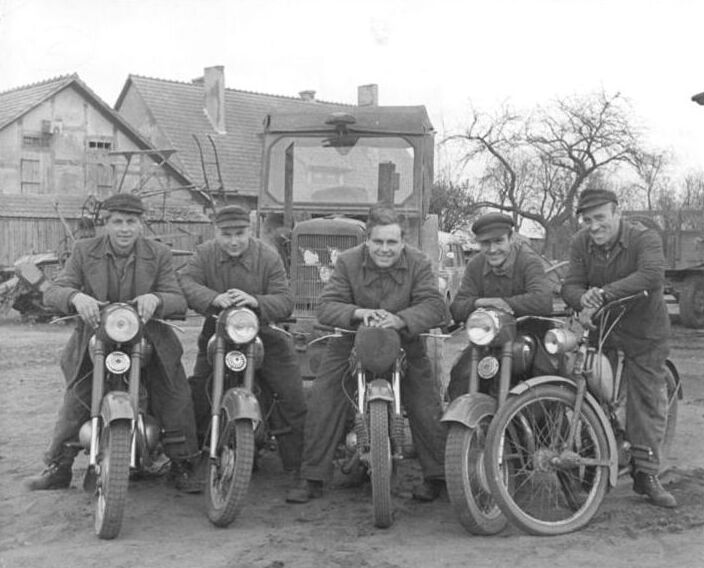
Maize farmers near Neubrandenburg in May 1960. The rider on the right of the picture is on a Simson SR-1.

In 1955, the year that the Simson brand name was restored, the factory also began making two-stroke mopeds. The first model was the SR 1, a 48 cc machine producing 1.5 bhp. This was succeeded by the SR 2 in 1957 and the SR 2E in 1959. In 1958 Simson launched the KR 50, which has integral legshields and a rear wheel enclosure like a motor scooter, but 16-inch (410 mm) wheels like a small motorcycle. The KR 50 had a 48cc motor like the SR-series, but with a higher compression ratio that increased power output to 2.1 bhp.

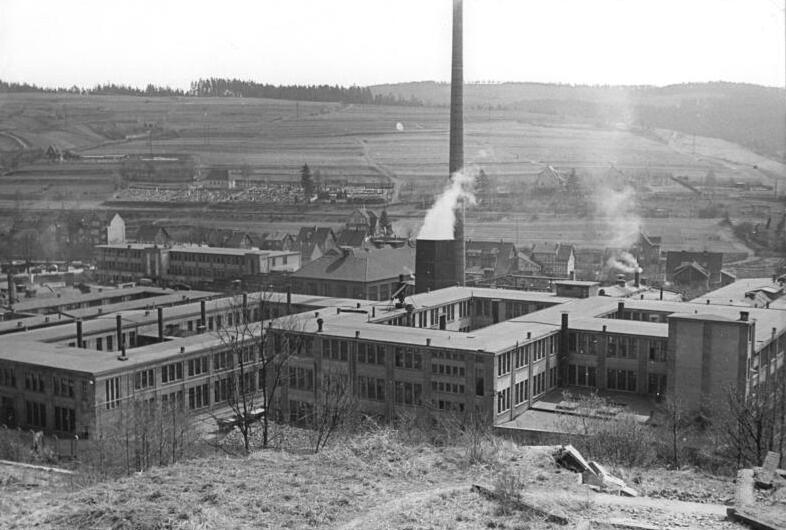
The Simson factory in 1963

When four-stroke motorcycle production was terminated, the Simson factory was directed to concentrate on moped production. In 1963 it raised the KR 50's compression ratio to 8.5:1, which increased power to 2.3 bhp. In 1964 this model was succeeded by the KR 51 Schwalbe ("swallow"), in which the KR 50's 38 x 42mm long-stroke engine was revised with almost square dimensions of 39.5 x 40mm and 50cc displacement. Compression was raised again to 9.5:1, increasing power by almost 50% to 3.4 bhp. Moped production grew steadily in Suhl; up to 200,000 mopeds were built per year. In 1965 the Simson factory employed 4,000 workers.

In 1964 Simson launched the SR 4-1 Spatz ("sparrow") and SR 4-2 Star, each of which had motorcycle-style bodywork without the legshields and rear enclosure. The Spatz initially had the long-stroke 38 x 42mm engine and an 8.5:1 compression ratio and produced 2 bhp; the Star had an "over-square" 40 x 39.5 mm engine with 9.5:1 compression and produced 3.4 bhp. In 1967 the Spatz was revised as the SR 4-1 SK, which shared the Star's 40 x 39.5 mm engine dimensions but had an 8.5:1 compression ratio and produced 2.3 bhp. Spatz production was ended in 1970 and Star production was ended in 1975.

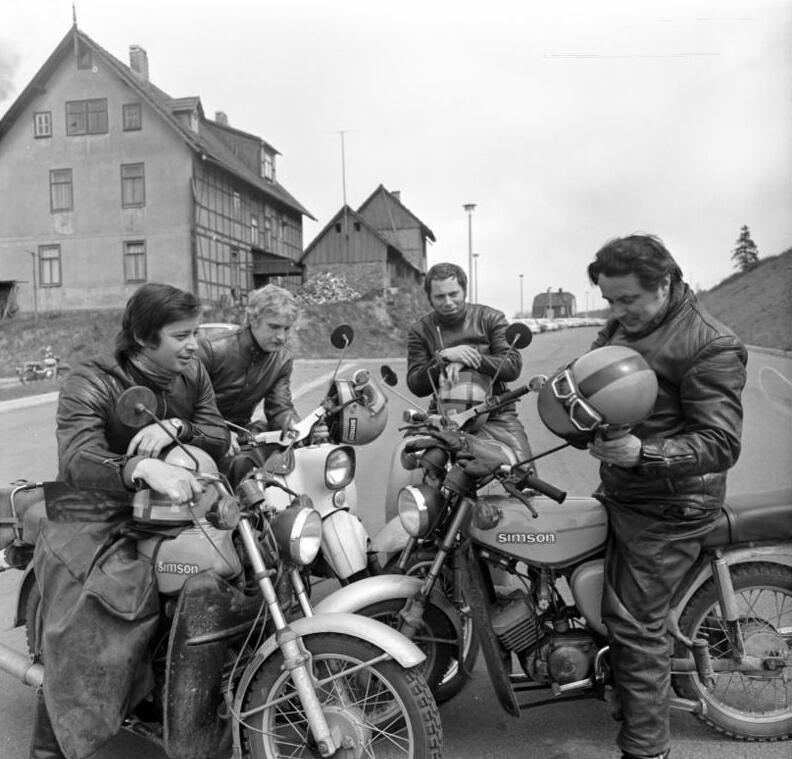
Simson test riders near Suhl on S 51 and KR 51/2 machines in December 1978.

In 1966 Simson introduced the SR 4-3 Sperber ("Sparrowhawk"), with the same 50 cc engine but with power increased to 4.6 bhp and more angular styling than the Spatz and Star. In 1971 Simson introduced the SR 4-4 Habicht ("hawk"), which was cosmetically the same as the Habicht but had the same 3.4 bhp power output as the Star. Sperber production was ended in 1972 and Habicht production continued until 1975.

In 1968 Simson was merged with VEB Ernst-Thälmann-Werk Suhl to form the VEB Fahrzeug- und Jagdwaffenwerk Ernst Thälmann Suhl. The Schwalbe helped the company to worldwide fame, and in the DDR the scooter stood for the success of East German two-wheeler motor manufacturing. The Schwalbe was slowly developed over the years. In 1968 the KR 51/1 series was introduced with power increased to 3.6 bhp, followed in 1979 by the KR 51/2 series with 3.7 bhp. Schwalbe production was ended in 1986 in favour of more modern Simson 50cc moped models.

In 1970 Simson introduced a bicycle-style, pedal-start moped, the 50cc, 1.6 bhp SL 1 Mofa. Mofa is a contraction of Motor-Fahrrad, German for "moped". The model was revised as the SL 1S in 1971 but was discontinued in 1972.

In 1975 Simson revised its image with a new model, the S 50. This used the 40 x 39.5 cc version of the Simson engine, produced 3.6 bhp and was produced in various versions until 1980. Its successor was the S 51, in which Simson revised the styling again and returned to a long-stroke engine, this time with 38 x 44 mm dimensions and a 3.7 bhp output. The S 51 was built in various forms until production was ended in 1990.

In 1983 Simson introduced a 70 cc model, the S 70. This had the S 51's long-stroke engine bored out by 7 mm, giving over-square dimensions of 45 x 44 mm and producing 5.6 bhp. Like the S 51, the S 70 was produced in various forms until 1990.

In 1986 Simson introduced a new 50 cc scooter, the SR 50. It had legshields and unlike the KR 50 and KR 51 it had scooter-sized 12-inch (300 mm) wheels. However, it had a motorcycle-style rear mudguard instead of a scoter-style rear enclosure. In 1987 a 70 cc version, the SR 80 was added to the range. The SR 50 and SR 80 were made in various versions until 1990.

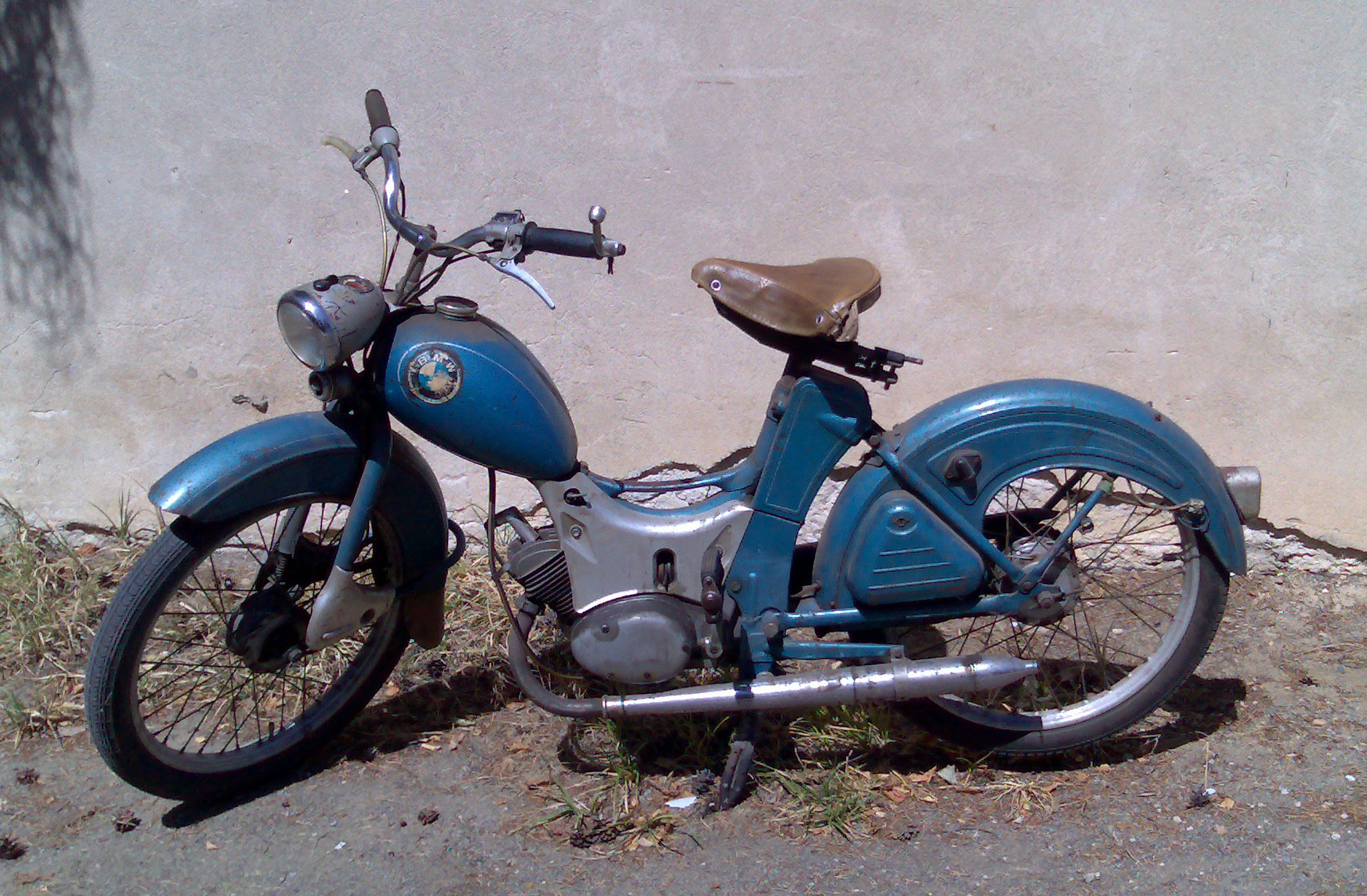
Simson SR 2E

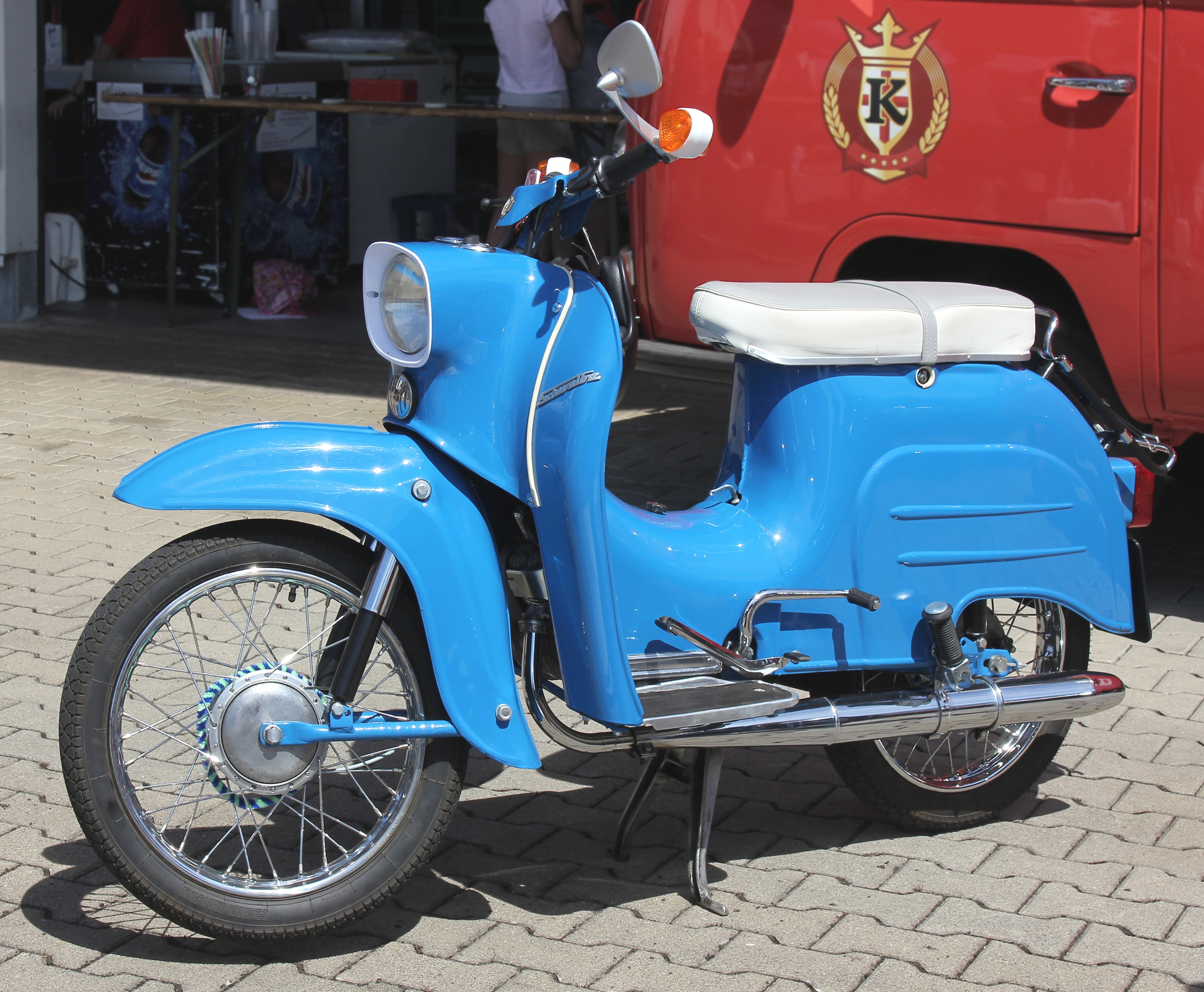
Simson KR 51-1F Schwalbe

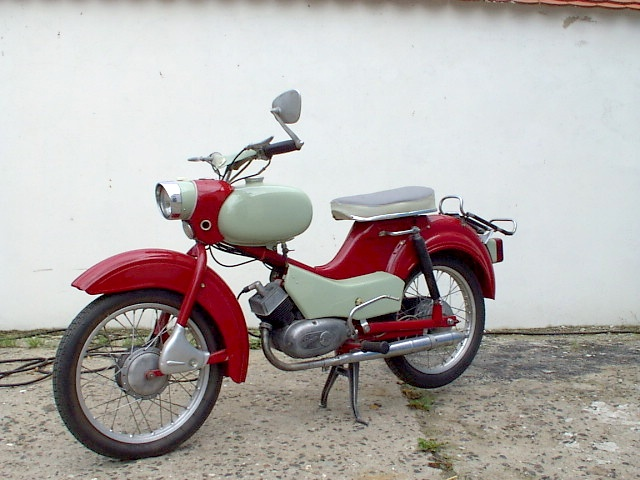
Simson SR 4-1 Spatz

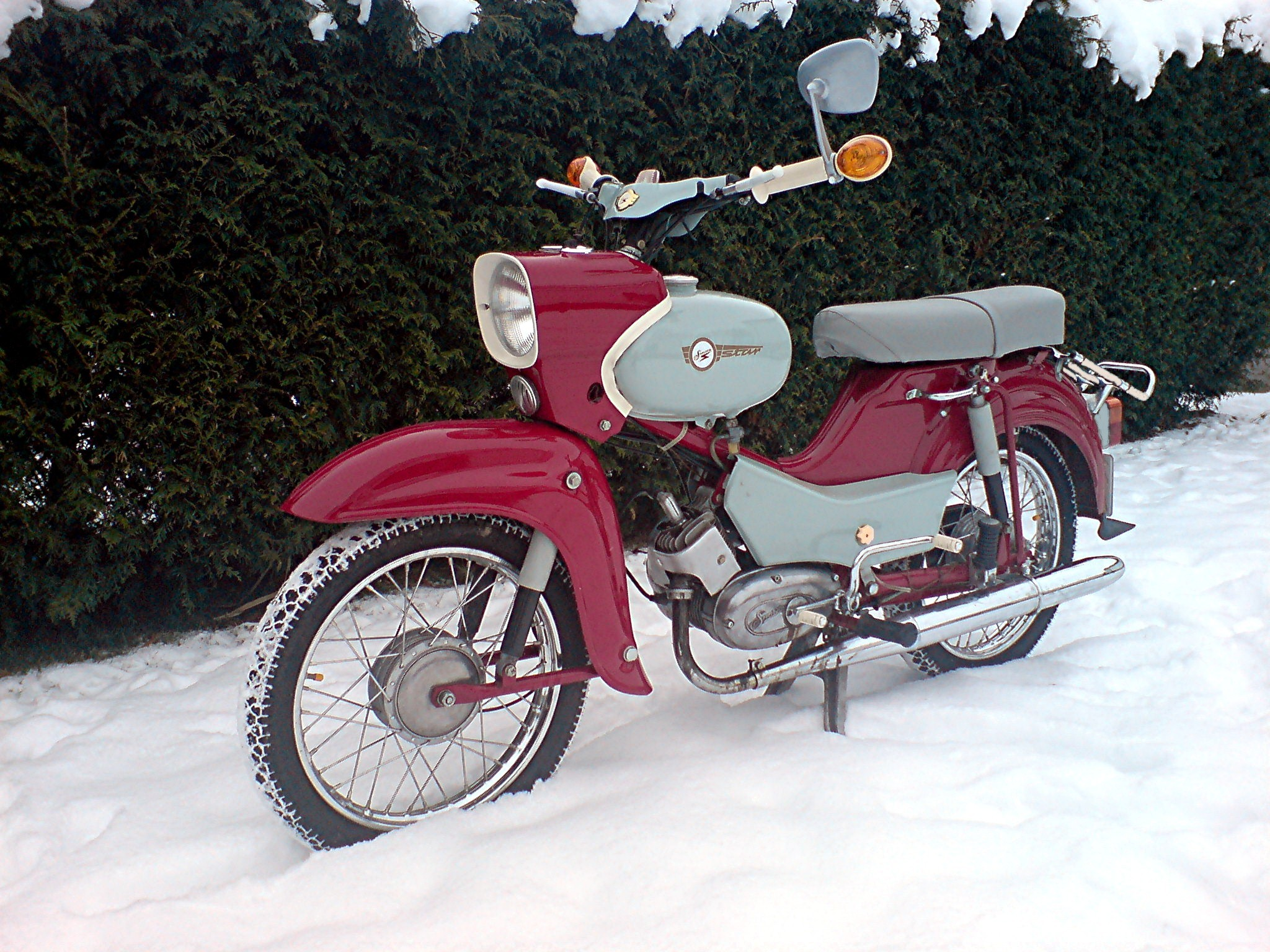
Simson SR 4-2 Star

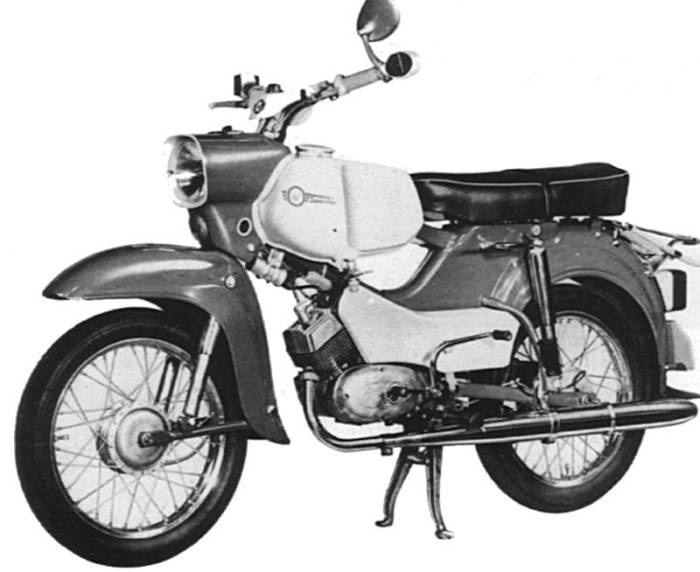
Simson SR 4-3 Sperber

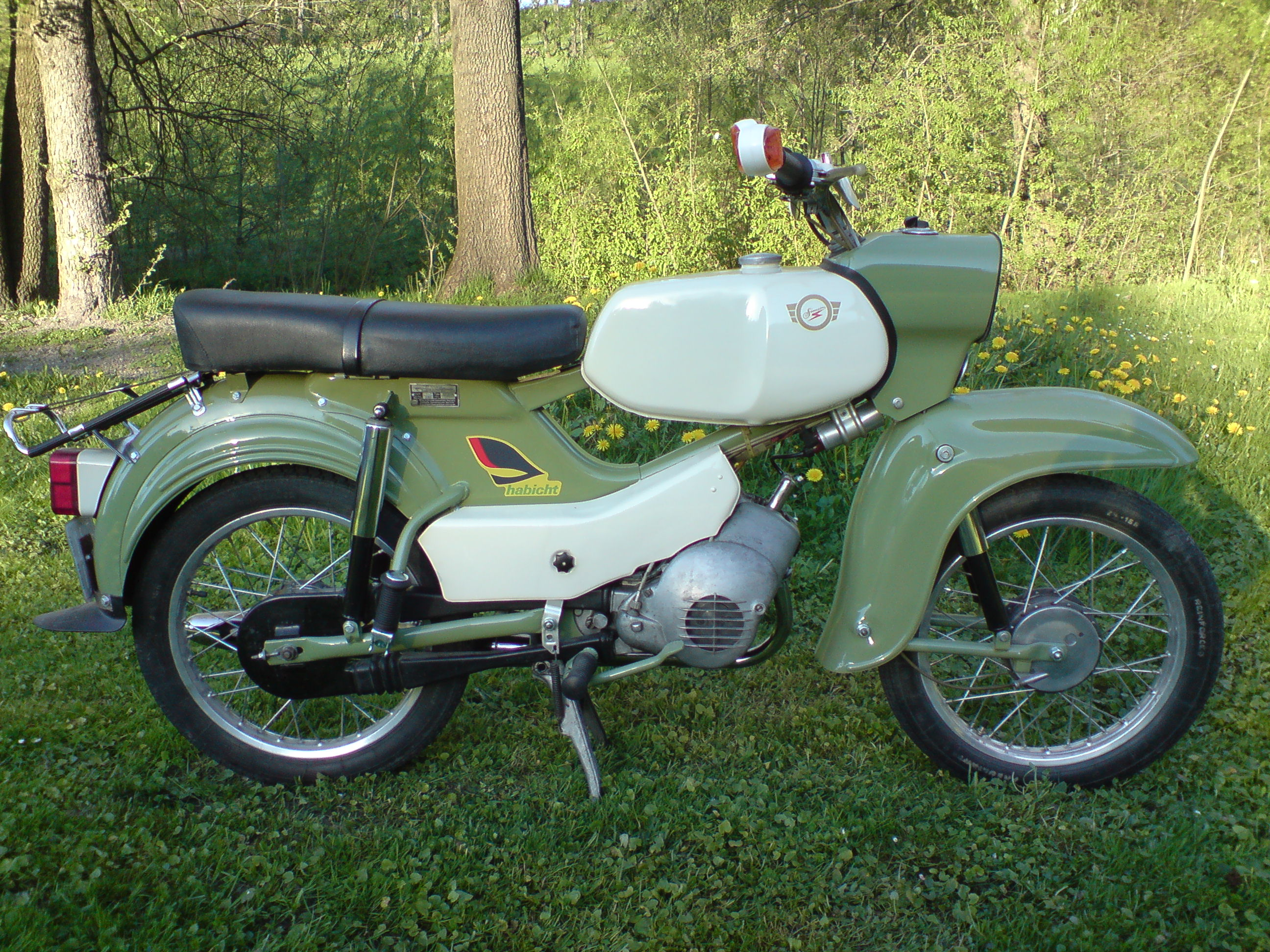
Simson SR 4-4 Habicht

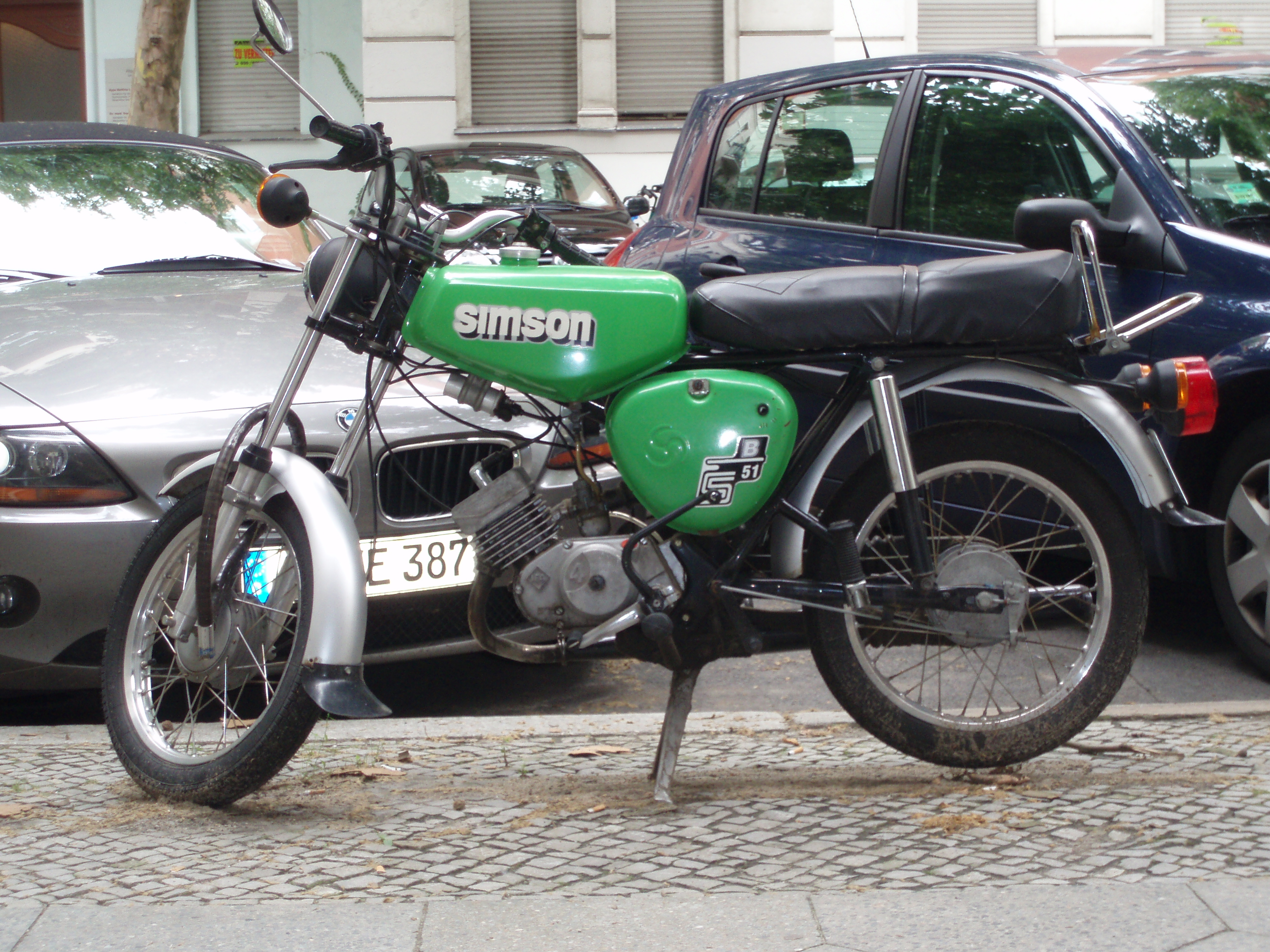
Simson S 51

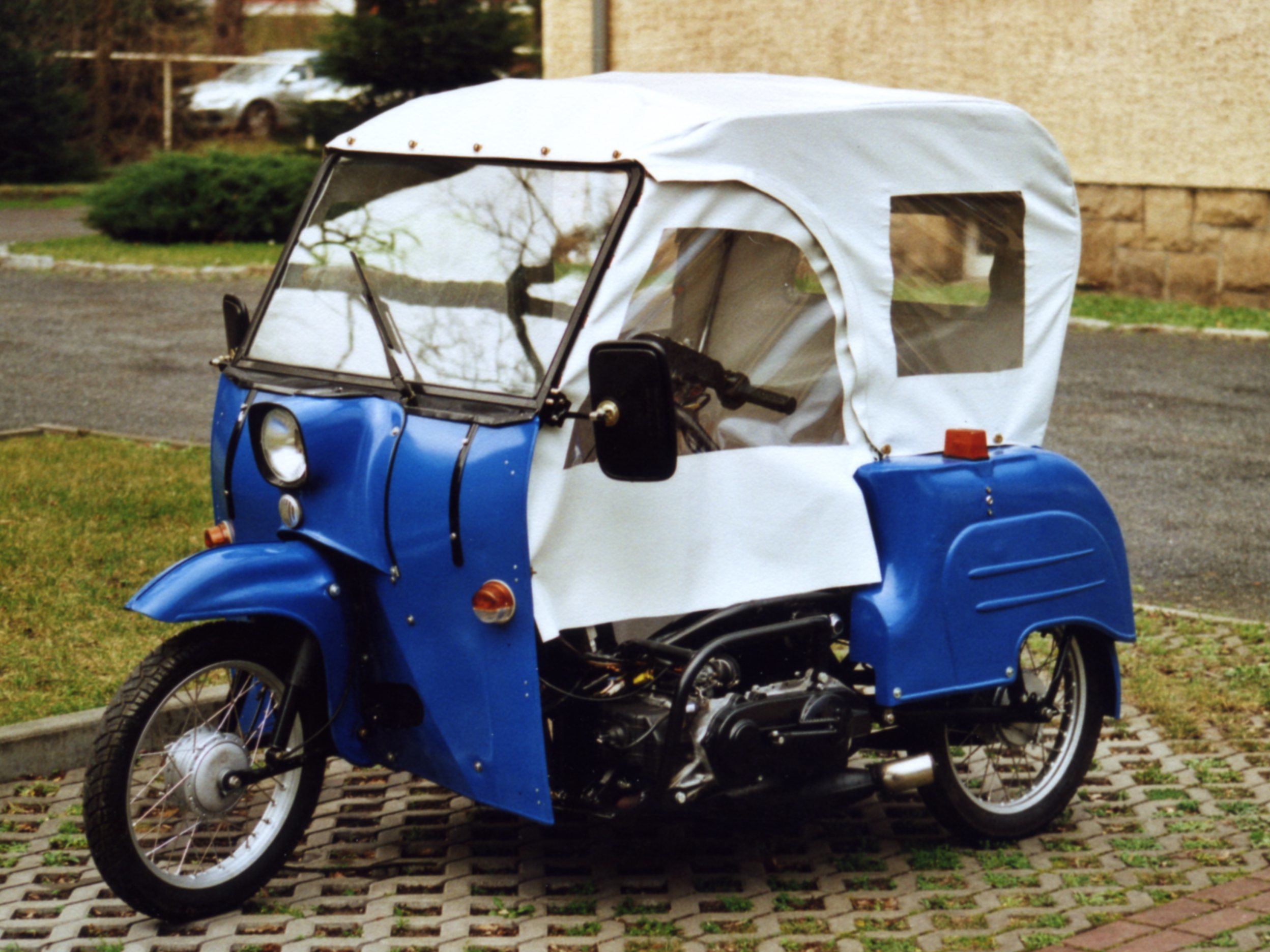
Simson DUO tricycle

=== 1990–2002 ===
Following the take over of East Germany by West Germany in 1990, a number of attempts to modernise the assembly lines were made. This included commercial production of Makarov PM pistols, which the factory had previously made under the Ernst Thälmann name for DDR Nationale Volksarmee ("National People's Army") and police use. Fewer than 1,000 commercial Makarovs were made under the Simson name before production was discontinued.

In 1990 the S 51 and S 70 models were revised as the 50 cc S 53 and 70 cc S 83. These were offered in a range of road-going and off-road versions, but total production of all versions from 1990 until 1994 was only about 10,500 machines.

In 1992 Simson resumed tricycle production with a 50 cc, 3.3 bhp model, the SD 50 LT. It is based on the SR 50 scooter but has a single seat with a 360-litre cargo space behind it. From 1994 the model was named the Albatros. Production continued until 2002.

In 1993 the Suhl factory began making the Hotzenblitz electric car under contract for Hotzenblitz Mobile GmbH & Co. KG of Ibach in Baden-Württemberg. Hotzenblitz is a portmanteau word derived from the Hotzenwald region of the Southern Black Forest around Ibach and blitz, German for "lightning". The car had two seats and weighed 780 kg (1,720 lb). It produced only 16 bhp and had a range of only 100 km (62 mi) to 150 km (93 mi). The car was a very limited success, and only 140 examples were built by the time production ended in 1996.

In 1993 the SR 50 and SR 80 scooters were revived. By 1997 revived production of the SR series totalled 3,100 examples, and production continued until 2002. In 1994 the S 53 and S 83 were revised with two versions each: the road-going alpha and off-road beta. These were made until 1996 but production figures are unavailable. In 1996 Simson revived the Star model name for a new 50 cc scooter that had more curvaceous, fully enclosed bodywork. Production of this model continued until 2001.

In 1996 Simson renamed the alpha and beta range by reviving the Habicht model name. In 1997 it introduced a 5.1 bhp version of the 50 cc machine, for which it revived the model Sperber name. In 1999 new 50 cc models were introduced: the Sperber Sport with a sports full fairing and a new Spatz with a space frame. Further 50 cc models were the semi-off-road Fighter in 2000 and the SC and TS series in 2002.

In 1998 Simson introduced a 125cc model, the Shikra (shikra is a type of goshawk). The machine has a space frame and is powered by a Honda four-stroke 15 bhp engine built under licence in Taiwan. In 2000 the Shikra name was discontinued, power output was reduced to 13.6 bhp and the model became simply the Simson 125.

Several investors tried to keep production going and to bring new developments to market, but production ceased in autumn 2002. On 1 February 2003, bankruptcy proceedings were held, in the wake of which the remaining 90 employees were made redundant without any compensation.

The Schwalbe has since gained cult status in western Germany.

== 2020s ==
During the 2020s, The Alternative for Germany (AfD) in Eastern German states (Thuringia and Saxony-Anhalt) have used the iconic East German Simson mopeds in political campaigns to court regional nostalgia (Ostalgie), sparking fierce backlash from the Jewish family (who now live in the United States) that originally founded the company.

== Gallery ==
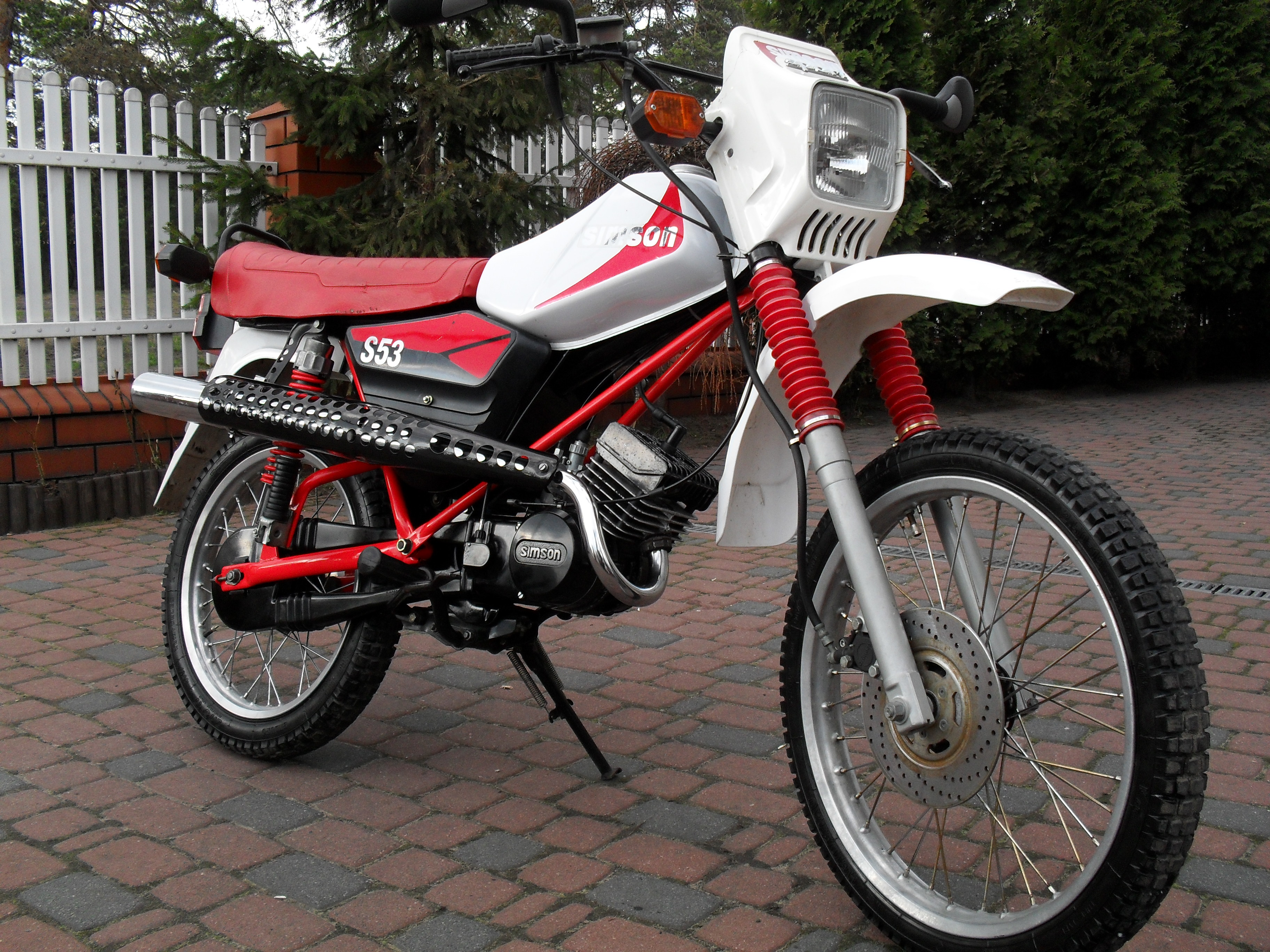
Simson S 53 OR

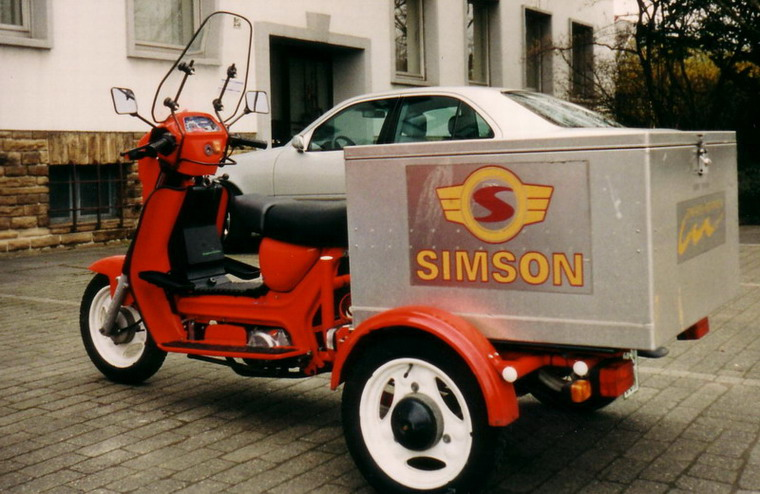
Simson SD 50 tricycle

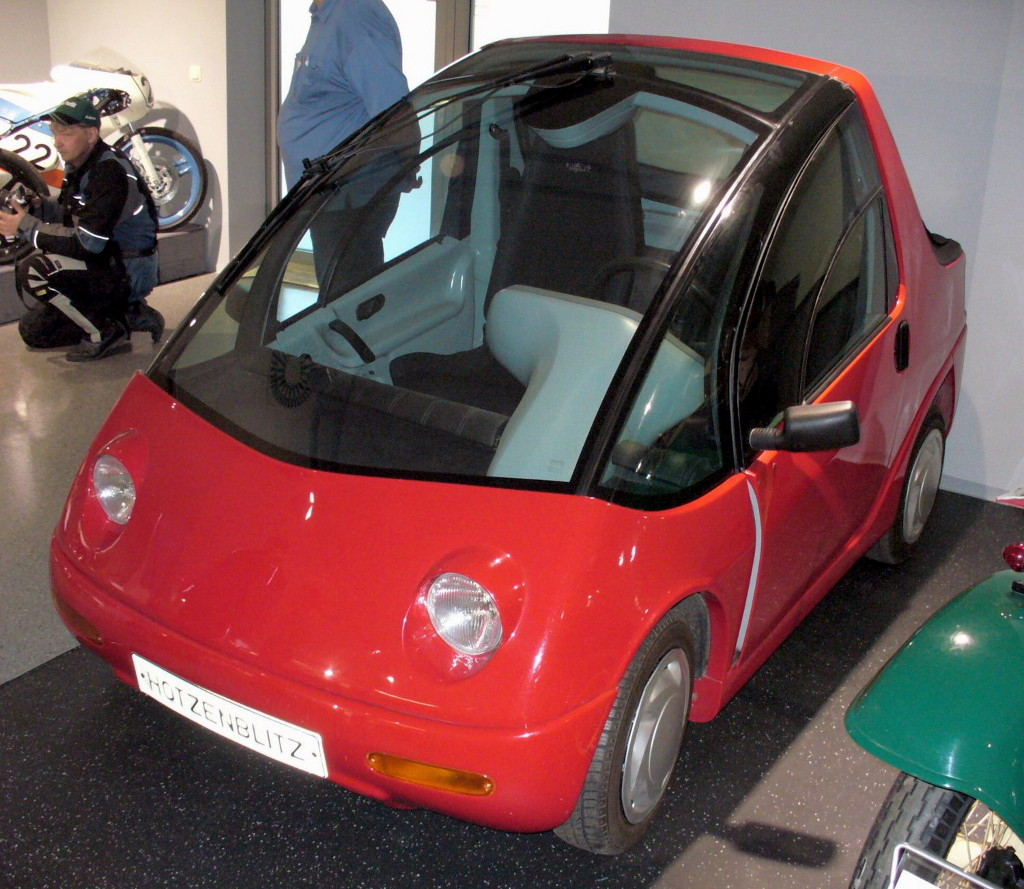
Hotzenblitz electric car

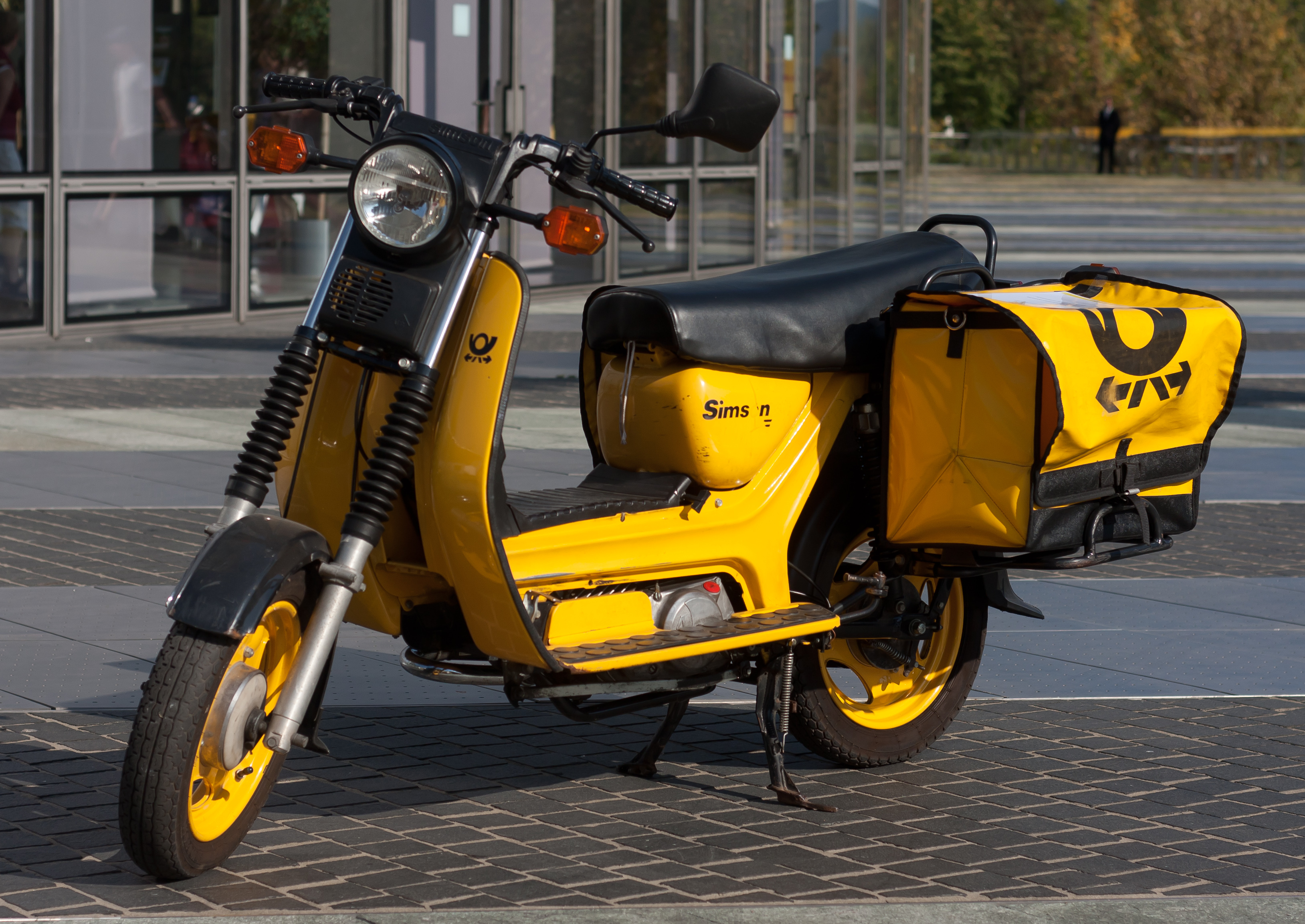
1995 SR 50 in Deutsche Bundespost service in Cologne.

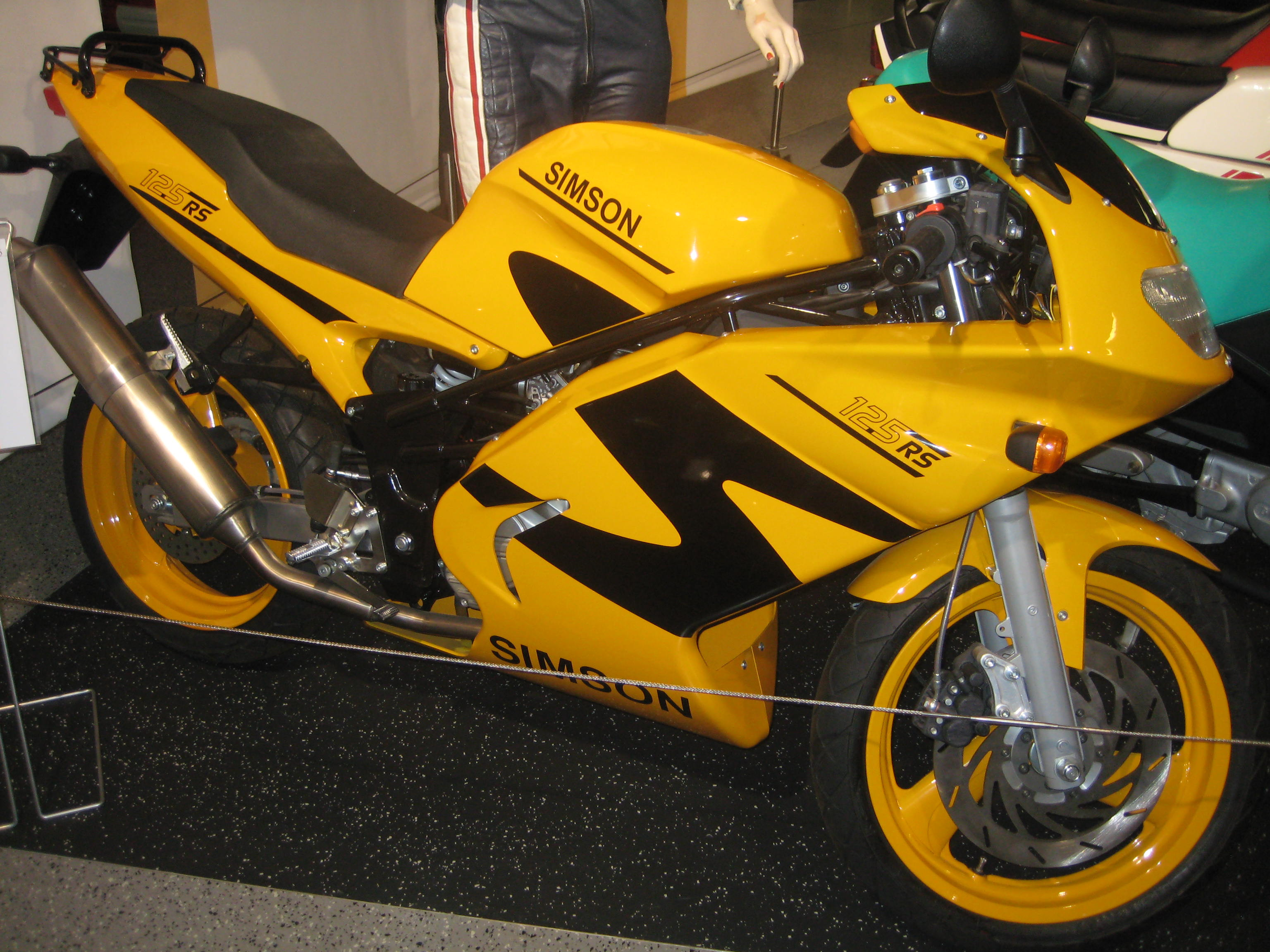
Simson 125 RS

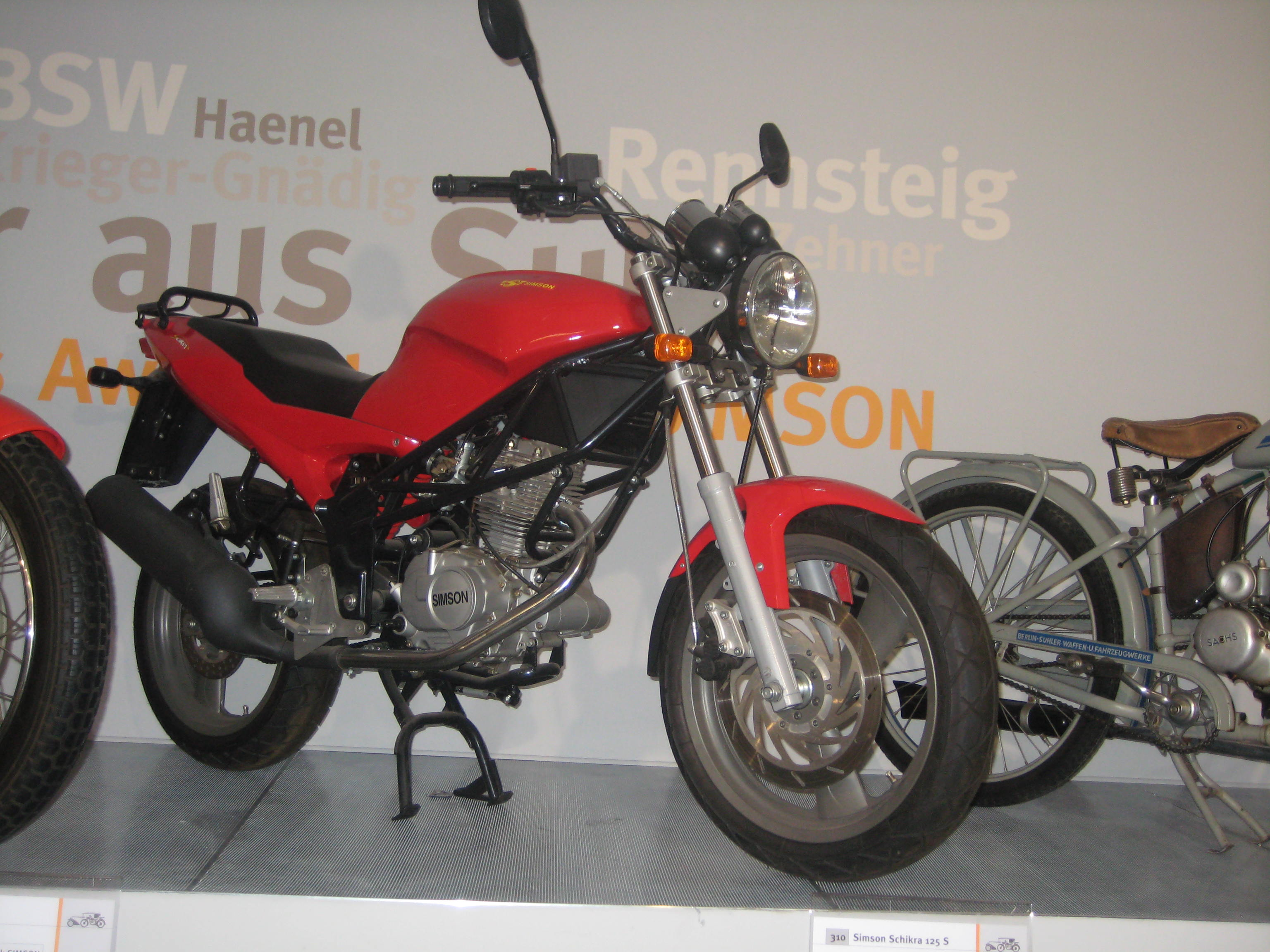
Simson Shikra

== Bibliography ==
- Böttcher, Knut (1999) [1975]. "Mokick S 50". In Schrader, Halwart (ed.). Motorräder aus der DDR (in German) (2nd ed.). Stuttgart: Schrader Verlag. pp. 116–122. ISBN 3-613-87176-9.
- Dähn, Ewald (1999) [1980]. "Großserienbau von Kleinkrafträdern". In Schrader, Halwart (ed.). Motorräder aus der DDR (in German) (2nd ed.). Stuttgart: Schrader Verlag. pp. 94–103. ISBN 3-613-87176-9.
- Edler, Karl-Heinz (1999) [1959]. "Die DDR-Rennmaschinen 1958". In Schrader, Halwart (ed.). Motorräder aus der DDR (in German) (2nd ed.). Stuttgart: Schrader Verlag. pp. 148–149. ISBN 3-613-87176-9.
- Rönicke, Frank (2009). DDR-Motorräder seit 1945. Typenkompass (in German) (2nd ed.). Stuttgart: Motorbuch Verlag. ISBN 978-3-613-02776-3.
- Schröder, Wolfgang (2009) [1995]. Die Motorrad- und PKW-Produktion der DDR — AWO • MZ • Simson • Trabant • Wartburg (in German) (1st ed.). Bielefeld: Delius Klasing Verlag. ISBN 978-3-7688-2517-7.
- Seyfert, H. (1999a) [1963]. "In memoriam: Die Simson-Viertakter". In Schrader, Halwart (ed.). Motorräder aus der DDR (in German) (2nd ed.). Stuttgart: Schrader Verlag. pp. 88–93. ISBN 3-613-87176-9.
- Seyfert, H. (1999b) [1965]. "Schwalbe, Spatz und Star — die Kleinfahrzuege aus dem VEB Simson Suhl". In Schrader, Halwart (ed.). Motorräder aus der DDR (in German) (2nd ed.). Stuttgart: Schrader Verlag. pp. 122–132. ISBN 3-613-87176-9.
- Tinker, Edward B.; Johnson, Graham K. (2007). Simson Lugers: Simson & Co, Suhl, the Weimar Years. Galesburg, IL: Brad Simpson Publishing. ISBN 978-0-9727815-1-0.
- Wilson, Hugo (1995). The Encyclopaedia of the Motorcycle. London: Dorling Kindersley. ISBN 0-7513-0206-6.
- Wise, David Burgess (1992). Encyclopedia of Automobiles. Seacaucus, NJ: Wellfleet Press. p. 300. ISBN 1-55521-808-3.
