= Awo-Idemili =

Town in Imo state, Nigeria

- Town
- Location in Nigeria
- Coordinates: 5°35′14″N 7°01′39″E
- Country: Nigeria

Awo-Idemili is the headquarters of Orsu local government, Imo State, southeastern Nigeria. It is located near the city of Orlu.

The former Imo state Governor, chief Achike Udenwa announced the creation of the autonomous community. Awo-Idemili broke into five autonomous communities:

- ISIAMA autonomous community (including Isieke and Amaimo)
- OKWU-AMARAIHE autonomous community (including Ezeogwu, Ubahaeze, Obibi and Amadi)
- OKWU-FURUAKU autonomous community (including Ahaba, Ohukabia, Amaokwu and Ubahaezedeke)
- ETITI autonomous community (including Edenta and Ubahaezike)
- AWO-IDEMILI autonomous community (including Ede)
