= 2 cm Flak 30, Flak 38 and Flakvierling 38 =

Family of Light Anti-aircraft guns

2 cm Flak 30/38
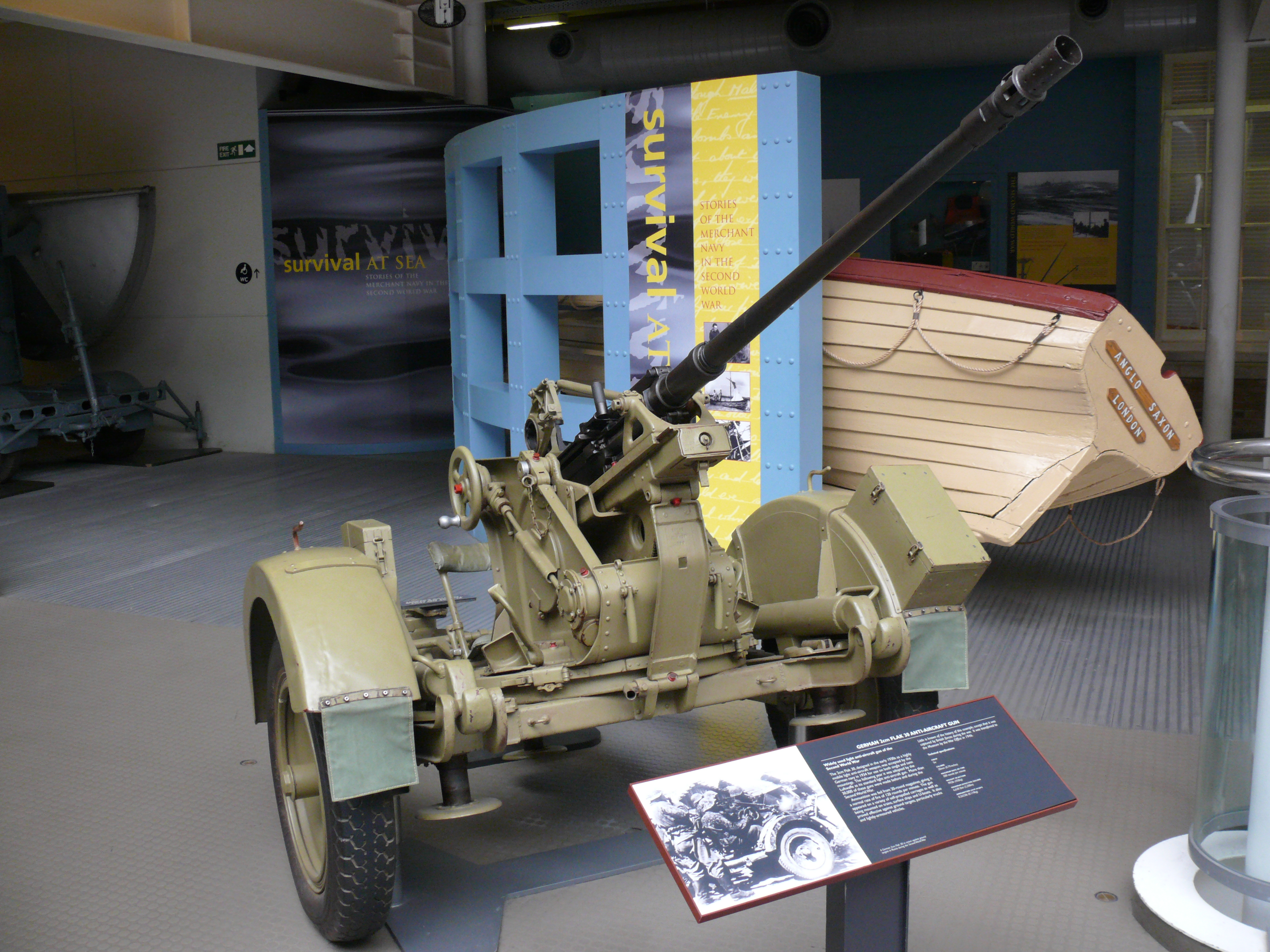
- 2 cm Flak 30 in travel configuration in the Imperial War Museum London
- Type: Anti-aircraft gun
- Place of origin: Nazi Germany

Service history
- In service: April 1934–1945
- Used by: See Users
- Wars: Spanish Civil War; World War II; Portuguese Colonial War; First Indochina War; Laotian Civil War

Production history
- Manufacturer: Rheinmetall-Borsig; Mauser; Ostmarkwerk
- Unit cost: 3500 Reichsmark
- Produced: 1934–1945
- No. built: more than 144,000 (Flakvierling count per barrel); Flak 30: 8,000+ Flak 38: 40,000+
- Variants: 2 cm Flak 38, Gebirgsflak 38, Flakvierling 38

Specifications
- Mass: Flak 30: 450 kg (990 lb); Flak 38: 405 kg (893 lb)
- Length: 4.08 m (13 ft 5 in)
- Barrel length: 1.3 m (4 ft 3 in) L/65
- Width: 1.81 m (5 ft 11 in)
- Height: 1.6 m (5 ft 3 in)
- Crew: 5
- Shell: 20×138mmB
- Caliber: 20 mm (.79 in)
- Elevation: -12°to ±90°
- Traverse: 360°
- Rate of fire: Flak 30: 280 rpm (cyclic)/120 rpm (practical); Flak 38: 450 rpm (cyclic)/180 rpm (practical)
- Muzzle velocity: 900 m/s (2,953 ft/s)
- Effective firing range: 2,200 m (2,406 yds) (anti-aircraft)
- Maximum firing range: 5,783 m (5,230 yds) (ground range)
- Feed system: 20 round box magazine

The Flak 30 (Flugzeugabwehrkanone 30) and improved Flak 38 were 20 mm anti-aircraft guns used by various German forces throughout World War II. It was not only the primary German light anti-aircraft gun but by far the most numerously produced German artillery piece throughout the war. It was produced in a variety of models, notably the Flakvierling 38 which combined four Flak 38 autocannons onto a single carriage.

== Development ==
=== 2 cm C/30, 2 cm Flak 30 ===
The Germans fielded the unrelated early 2 cm Flak 28 just after World War I, but the Treaty of Versailles outlawed these weapons and they were sold to Switzerland.

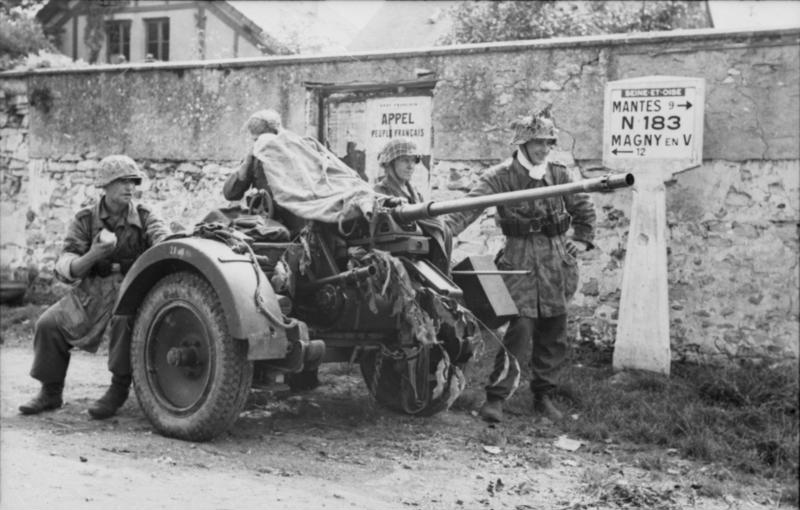
Flak 30 in travel configuration, Seine-et-Oise, France, August 1944

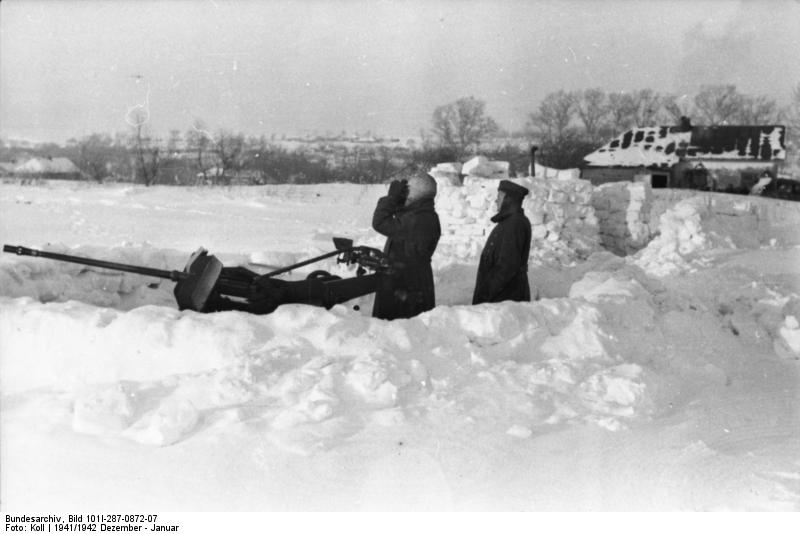
Flak 30 on the Eastern Front

The original Flak 30 design was developed from the Solothurn ST-5 as a project for the Kriegsmarine, which produced the 2 cm C/30. The gun fired the "Long Solothurn", a 20 × 138 mm belted cartridge that had been developed for the ST-5 and was one of the more powerful 20 mm rounds.

The C/30, featuring a barrel length of 65 calibres, had a fire rate of about 120 rounds per minute. It proved to have feeding problems and would often jam, which was offset to some degree by its undersized 20 round-magazine which tended to make reloading a frequent necessity. Nevertheless, the C/30 became the primary shipborne light AA weapon and equipped a large variety of German ships.

The MG C/30L variant was also used experimentally as an aircraft weapon, notably on the Heinkel He 112 V6, where its high power allowed it to penetrate the thinly armored roofs of Republican armoured cars and light tanks of the era during the Spanish Civil War.

Rheinmetall then started an adaptation of the C/30 for Army use, producing the 2 cm Flak 30. Generally similar to the C/30, the main areas of development were the mount, which was fairly compact.

Set-up could be accomplished by dropping the gun off its two-wheeled trailer, "Sonderanhänger 51" (trailer 51) and levelling the gun using hand cranks. The result was a triangular base that permitted fire in all directions.

=== 2 cm Flak 38, 2 cm GebFlak 38, 2 cm C/38 ===
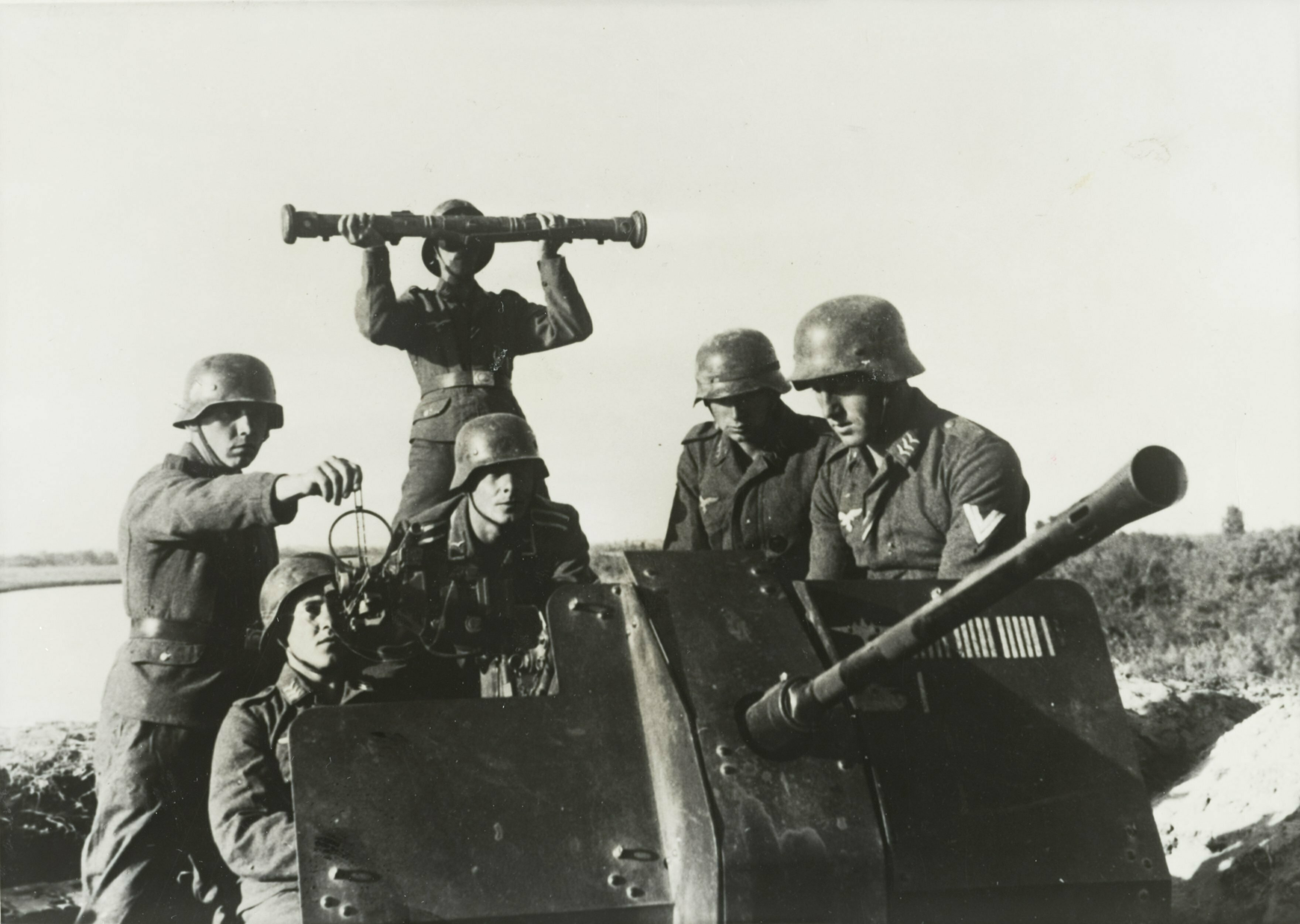
Flak 38 in 1942.

But the main problem with the design remained unsolved. The rate of fire of 120 RPM (rounds per minute) was not particularly fast for a weapon of this calibre. Rheinmetall (Note: The original source articles used to produce this single combined version state different companies for the manufacture of the various models. It suggested that Mauser produced all of the Flak 38 and later variants.) responded with the 2 cm Flak 38, which was otherwise similar but increased the rate of fire by 220 RPM and slightly lowered overall weight to 420 kg. The Flak 38 was accepted as the standard Army gun in 1939, and by the Kriegsmarine as the 2 cm C/38.

In order to provide airborne and mountain troops with an AA capability, Mauser was contracted to produce a lighter version of the Flak 38, which they introduced as the 2 cm Gebirgsflak 38 (2 cm GebFlak 38). It featured a dramatically simplified mount using a tripod that raised the entire gun off the ground, with the additional benefit of allowing the weapon to be set up on an uneven surface. These changes reduced the overall weight of the gun to 276.0 kg. Production started in 1941 and it entered service in 1942.

=== 2 cm Flakvierling 38 ===
2 cm Flakvierling 38
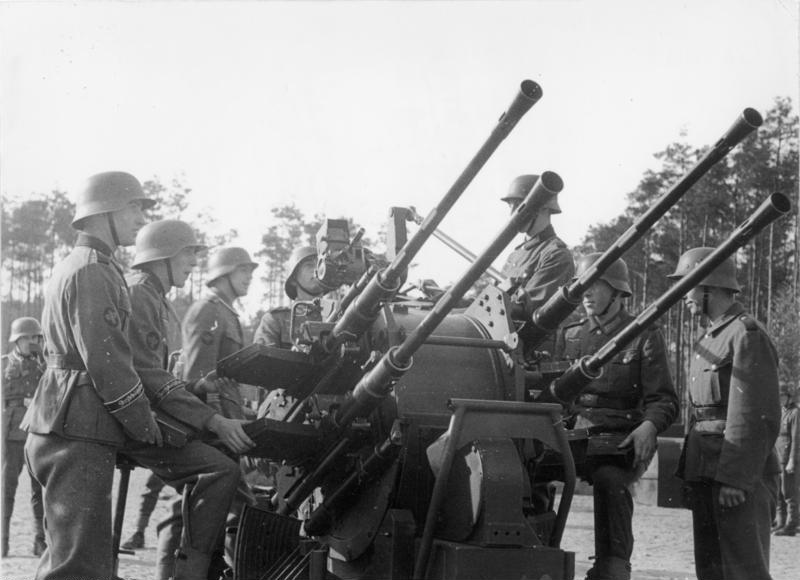
- Members of the Panzer-Grenadier-Division Großdeutschland train with a 2,0cm Flakvierling 38 (1943)
- Type: Anti-aircraft gun
- Place of origin: Nazi Germany

Service history
- In service: March 1940–1945
- Used by: Nazi Germany
- Wars: World War II; Yugoslav Wars

Production history
- Designer: Mauser
- Designed: 1940
- Manufacturer: Mauser; Rheinmetall; Ostmarkwerk
- Produced: 1940–1945
- No. built: 3,768

Specifications
- Mass: 1,509 kg (3,327 lbs) with trailer
- Length: 4.08 m (13 ft 5 in)
- Barrel length: 1.3 m (4 ft 3 in) L/65
- Width: 1.81 m (5 ft 11 in)
- Height: 1.6 m (5 ft 3 in)
- Crew: 8
- Shell: 20×138mmB
- Caliber: 2,0cm (.78 in)
- Action: Recoil operation
- Breech: Rotating bolt
- Carriage: Sd.Ah 52 (Special Trailer 52)
- Elevation: 10° - +100°
- Traverse: 360°
- Rate of fire: 1,800 rpm (Cyclic); 800 rpm (Practical)
- Muzzle velocity: 900 m/s (2,953 ft/s)
- Effective firing range: 2,200 m (2,406 yds) (anti-aircraft)
- Maximum firing range: 5,783 m (5,230 yds) (ground range)
- Feed system: 4x 20 round box magazines

Even as the Flak 30 was entering service, the Luftwaffe and Heer (army) branches of the Wehrmacht had doubts about its effectiveness, given the ever-increasing speeds of low-altitude fighter-bombers and attack aircraft. The Army in particular felt the proper solution was the introduction of the 37 mm calibre weapons they had been developing since the 1920s, which had a rate of fire about the same as the Flak 38 but fired a round with almost eight times the weight. This not only made the rounds deadlier on impact, but their higher energy and ballistic coefficient allowed them to travel much longer distances, allowing the gun to engage targets at longer ranges. This meant it could keep enemy aircraft under fire over longer time spans.

The 20 mm weapons had always had weak development perspectives, often being reconfigured or redesigned just enough to allow the weapons to find a use. Indeed, it came as a surprise when Rheinmetall introduced the 2 cm Flakvierling 38, which improved the weapon just enough to make it competitive again. The term Vierling literally translates to "quadruplet" and refers to the four 20 mm autocannon constituting the design.

The Flakvierling weapon consisted of quad-mounted 2 cm Flak 38 AA guns with collapsing seats, folding handles, and ammunition racks. The mount had a triangular base with a jack at each leg for levelling the gun. The tracker traversed and elevated the mount manually using two handwheels. When raised, the weapon measured 307 cm (10 feet 1 inch) high.

Each of the four guns had a separate magazine that held only 20 rounds. This meant that a maximum combined rate of fire of 1,400 rounds per minute was reduced practically to 800 rounds per minute for combat use – which would still require that an emptied magazine be replaced every six seconds, on each of the four guns. This is the attainable rate of fire; the sustained rate of fire is significantly lower due to heat buildup and barrel erosion. Automatic weapons are typically limited to roughly 100 rounds per minute per barrel to give time for the heat to dissipate, although this can be exceeded for short periods if the firing window is brief.

The gun was fired by two pedals – each of which fired two diametrically opposite barrels – in either semi-automatic or automatic mode. The effective vertical range was 2,200 metres. It was also used just as effectively against ground targets as it was against low-flying aircraft.

== Mounting versatility ==
=== Flak 30/38 single mount ===
The Flak 30/38, when not mounted into any self-propelled mount, was normally transported on a Sd.Ah. 51 trailer and could be towed behind a variety of vehicles, including:

- Cars, such as the Kübelwagen and Horch 108;
- Trucks, such as the Opel Blitz, Krupp L 2 H 143, Mercedes-Benz L3000, Borgward B 3000;
- Half-tracks, such as the armoured Sd.Kfz. 251, the unarmored Sd.Kfz. 2 and Sd.Kfz. 10 light half-track vehicles.

Beside being towed, the Flak 30/38 could be mounted on a variety of vehicles, ranging from being mounted on the rear platform of cars, trucks and half-tracks, including vehicles such as the Sd.Kfz. 10/4 and 10/5 (Flak 30 / Flak 38), Sd.Kfz. 11/1 (Flak 38) to being used for dedicated anti-air vehicles such as Flakpanzer I and Flakpanzer 38(t).

=== Flakvierling 38 ===
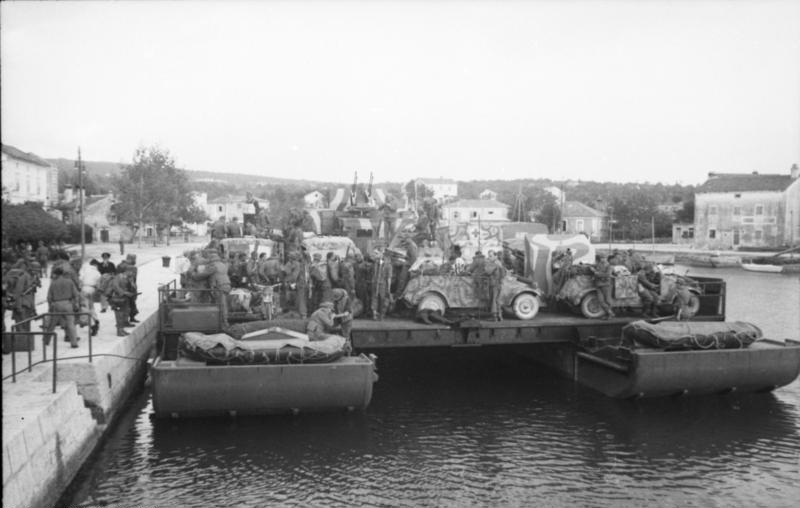
The rear-location wheelhouse of this Siebel ferry features a Flakvierling quadmount AA battery to defend it in 1943 Yugoslavia.

The Flakvierling four-autocannon anti-aircraft ordnance system, when not mounted into any self-propelled mount, was normally transported Sd. Ah. 52 trailer, and could be towed behind a variety of half-tracks or trucks, such as the Opel Blitz truck, the Sd.Kfz. 251 armoured half-track, the Sd.Kfz. 10 light half-track, the Sd.Kfz. 7 and Sd.Kfz. 11 artillery-towing half-track vehicles.

Its versatility concerning the vehicles it could be mounted to a variety of trucks and half-tracks, such as the Sd.Kfz. 7/1, included its use even on tank hulls to produce fully armoured mobile anti-aircraft vehicles, such as the Panzer IV-based low-production Flakpanzer IV "Wirbelwind" and original Flakpanzer IV "Möbelwagen"-based prototype anti-aircraft tanks.

Several field modifications existed in the war, including mounting the Flakvierling onto 3 Panzer IVs, made by SS-Hauptsturmführer Karl Wilhelm Krause with the 12th SS Panzer Division Hitlerjugend (which inspired the Wirbelwind), as well as mounting it on a captured T-34 and a Bergepanther (made by Schwere Panzerjäger-Abteilung 653).

=== Kriegsmarine ===
In Kriegsmarine use, it was fitted to E-boats, U-boats, Siebel ferries and ships to provide short-range anti-aircraft defence, and was also employed in fixed installations around ports, harbours and other strategic naval targets.

A number of mountings were developed by the Kriegsmarine, including:

- Sockel C/30 - Single mount for C/30 and C/38 gun
- Flakzwilling C/38 - Twin mount for C/38 guns
- Flak C/35 - Quad mount with C/30 guns
- Flak C/38 auf Vierlingslafette C/38 - Quad mount with C/38 guns
- Flakvierling C/38 - Army quad mount adapted for naval use
- C/30/37 - twin mount for mounting on a U-boat
- LM44U - twin mount for mounting on a U-boat
- L41 - single mount for mounting on a E-boat

=== Others ===
The Flakvierling was also a common fixture on trains, even on Hitler's own command train (Führersonderzug), where pairs of them were mounted on either end of a "camelback" flatbed car and then covered to make it look like a boxcar, sometimes with a pair of such twin-Flakvierling mount cars for defence, one near each end of Hitler's Führersonderzug train.

== Ammunition ==
A range of 20x138B ammunition was manufactured for 2 cm Flak weapons, the more commonly used types are listed on the following table. Other types included practice rounds (marked Übung or Üb. in German notation) and a number of different AP types including a high-velocity PzGr 40 round with a tungsten carbide core in an aluminium body.

German designation	US Abbreviation	Projectile weight [g]	Bursting charge	Muzzle velocity [m/s]	Description
Sprenggranatpatrone L'spur mit Zerleger	HEF-T	115 g (4.1 oz)	6.2–6.4 g (0.22–0.23 oz) HE (PETN + wax)	930 m/s	Nose fuzed tracer round, self-destruct after 5.5 - 6.5 seconds (2000m range) due to tracer burn-through.
Sprenggranatpatrone L'spur W mit Zerleger	HEF-T	120 g (4.2 oz)	6.2–6.4 g (0.22–0.23 oz) HE (PETN + wax)	900	Boat-tailed HE-Frag. nose fuzed tracer round with heat transfer. Self-destruct after 5.5 - 6.5 seconds (2000m range) due to tracer burn-through.
Sprenggranatpatrone 39 Erd	HEF	120 g (4.2 oz)	11 g (0.39 oz) HE (PETN + wax)	900 m/s	HE-Frag. round with nose fuze, no tracer. Exclusively against ground targets.
Brandsprenggranatpatrone L'spur (Flak) mit Zerleger	HEI-T	120 g (4.2 oz)	2.4 g (0.085 oz) HE (PETN) + 4.1 g (Aluminium)	900 m/s	Nose fuze, tracer, with self-destruct after 5.5 - 6.5 seconds (2000m range) due to tracer burn-through.
Brandsprenggranatpatrone ohne L'spur (Flak) mit Zerleger	HEI	120 g (4.2 oz)	22 g total 20 g (0.71 oz) HE Hexogen 5 (RDX) + (Zinc) powder + wax	900 m/s	Boat-tailed nose fuzed HEI round, no tracer, self-destruct after 5.5 - 8 seconds flight (2000-2800m range). Lack of tracer and high density of incendiary allows heavy filling load.
Bransprenggranatpatrone L'spur W mit Zerleger	HEFI-T	120 g (4.2 oz)	6.6–6.8 g (0.23–0.24 oz) g HE (PETN) + (Aluminium) + wax	900 m/s	Boat-tailed nose fuzed HE-Frag. incendiary tracer round with heat transfer. Self-destruct after at 2000m range due to tracer burn-through.
Brandsprenggranatpatrone vk. L'spur mit Zerleger	HEI-T	115 g (4.1 oz)	19 g (0.67 oz) HE Hexogen 5 (RDX) + (Aluminium) or (Zinc) powder + wax	930	Boat-tailed nose fuzed HEI tracer round. Self-destruct after 6 second (2200-2400m range) due to tracer burn-through.
Brandsprenggranatpatrone vk. L'spur W mit Zerleger	HEI-T	120 g (4.2 oz)	19 g (0.67 oz) HE Hexogen 5 (RDX) + (Aluminium) or (Zinc) powder + wax	900	Boat-tailed nose fuzed HEI tracer round with heat transfer. Self-destruct after 5.5 second (2000m range) due to tracer burn-through.
Brandsprenggranatpatrone mit Zerleger?	HEI	100 g (3.5 oz)	? g HE ? + ? g incendiary (WP)	1050 m/s	Nose fuze, no tracer, with self-destruct?
Brandsprenggranatpatrone L'spur mit Zerleger?	HEI-T	100 g (3.5 oz)	? g HE ? + ? g incendiary (WP)	1050 m/s	Nose fuze, tracer, with self-destruct? after ? second (?m range) due to tracer burn-through.
Minengeschosspatrone X L'spur mit Zerleger	HEI-T (M)	109 g (3.8 oz)	24.5–25 g (0.86–0.88 oz) HE HA 41 (RDX + (Aluminium) powder + wax)	950	Boat-tailed nose fuzed HE Mine-shell tracer round, self-destruct.
Panzergranatpatrone L'spur mit Zerleger	AP-T	148 g (5.2 oz)	2.4 g (0.085 oz) (PETN) + ? g (WP)	800 m/s	Base-fuzed tracer round, with self-destruct due to tracer burn-through after 4.5 second flight (1800m range).
Panzergranatpatrone L'spur mit Zerleger	AP-T	159 g (5.6 oz)	2.5 g (0.088 oz) (PETN) + ? g (WP)	?	Boat-tailed base-fuzed tracer round, with self-destruct after 2 second flight (1000m range).
Panzergranatpatrone 40 L'spur	APIHC-T; APICR-T; HVAPI-T	100 g (3.5 oz)	Light metal shell, special steel core	1050 m/s	Tungsten carbide core. Tracer round, with no fuze or self-destruct function. Tracer burn-through after 0,9 - 1.5 second flight (600m range). Penetrating effect with incendiary effect due to melting of light metal tip.
Panzerbrandgranatpatrone (Phosphor) L'spur ohne Zerleger	API-T	148 g (5.2 oz)	3.0 g (0.11 oz) incendiary (WP)	800 m/s	Tracer round, with no fuze or self-destruct function. Tracer burn-through after 1,8 second flight (1000m range).
Panzergranatpatrone L'spur ohne Zerleger "0"	AP-T	143 g (5.0 oz)	w/o filling	830 m/s	Tracer round, with no fuze or self-destruct function. Tracer burn-through after 1,8 second flight (1000m range).
Panzersprenggranatpatrone L'spur ohne Zerleger	APHE-T	121 g (4.3 oz)	3.6 g (0.13 oz) HE (PETN)	900 m/s	Base-fuzed tracer round, no self-destruct.
Panzersprenggranatpatrone L'spur mit Zerleger (Kriegsmarine)(Luftwaffe)	APHE-T	121 g (4.3 oz)	3.6 g (0.13 oz) HE (PETN)	900 m/s	Base-fuzed tracer round, self-destruct after 2 second flight (1000m range) or 4.3 - 4.6 seconds flight (1800m range) due to tracer burn-through.

== Users ==
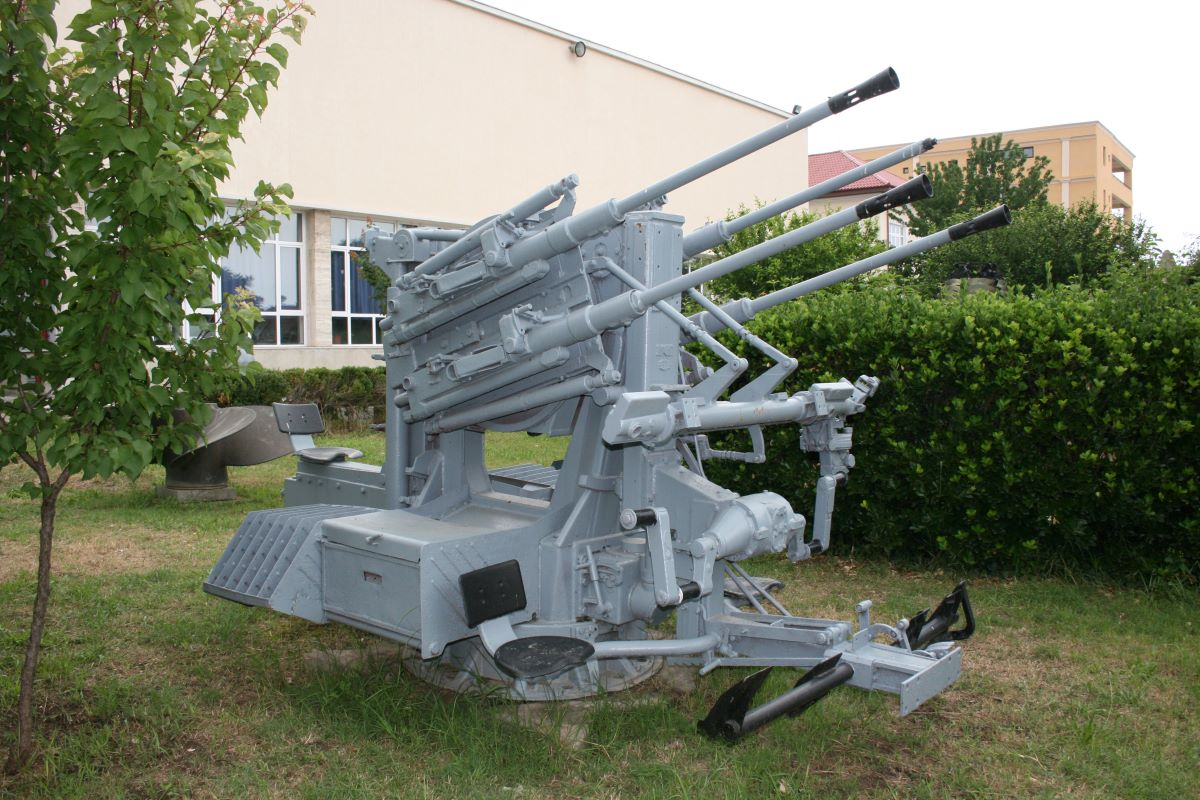
Flakvierling C/38 formerly mounted on the destroyer NMS Mărășești

- Denmark: 69 in service from 1945 to 1955 in The Royal Danish Navy, where it was known as 20 mm Mk M/39 LvSa, mounted on minesweepers of the SØLØVE class and motor torpedo boats of the GLENTEN class.
- Finland: 50 Flak 30 (named 20 Itk/30 BSW) delivered from Germany in 1939. 113 Flak 38 (named 20 ItK/38 BSW) guns bought during the Continuation War.
- Germany
- Greece: 108 total in service.
- Lithuania: 150 Flak 30 (named 20 mm lėktuvinis automatinis pabūklas, LAP) bought in 1939.
- Netherlands: 30 Flak 30 guns were bought and sent over for the Dutch East Indies army in 1938.
- Portugal: unknown number of Flak 30/38 guns (named Metralhadora Pesada AA 20mm m/943) bought in 1943 and used by the Portuguese Army during the Portuguese Colonial War (1961–1975).
- Romania: 300 ordered in September 1940, the delivery beginning in May 1941, known as Gustloff guns (after one of their manufacturers).
- Sweden: 56 Flak 30 bought in 1939, designated 20 mm lvakan m/39 in Swedish service.
- Vietnam: unknown number of Flak 30 guns provided by the Soviet Union used by the Viet Minh and the People's Army of Vietnam (PAVN) during the First Indochina War and the Laotian Civil War.
- Yugoslavia: Unknown number of Flakvierling 38 guns captured in 1945, re-designated (PA top M38 (n)) N standing for "German", used by the JNA until the 1980s, when the remaining guns were put into reserve storage and in the 1990s, during the Yugoslav wars, they were used in the direct fire role in support of infantry units.

== See also ==
- List of anti-aircraft guns
- List of artillery of Germany
- MG 151 cannon - German 20mm aircraft cannon developed during World War II.
- MG FF cannon - German 20mm aircraft cannon during early World War II. Developed from the Swiss Oerlikon FF.
- 2 cm KwK 30 - variant for armored cars and light tanks, slightly shortened barrel
- 20 mm Polsten - Equivalent British 20mm anti-aircraft gun, developed from a Polish design which was, in turn, derived from a version of the Swiss Oerlikon. The blueprints were brought to Britain by its creators after the invasion of Poland.
- Breda Model 35 - Equivalent Italian 20mm anti-aircraft gun.
- Hispano-Suiza HS.404 - Equivalent French-designed 20mm anti-aircraft gun used by many countries during World War II (also used to arm various aircraft).
- Type 98 20 mm AA machine cannon - Japanese 20mm anti-aircraft gun during World War II.
- Type 2 20 mm AA machine cannon - Japanese 20mm anti-aircraft gun derived from the German Flak 38 during World War II, supplementing the earlier Type 98.
- Automatkanon m/40 - Equivalent Swedish 20mm anti-aircraft gun.

== Similar ==
- M45 Quadmount, the closest Allied equivalent to the Flakvierling system

== Bibliography ==
- Gander, Terry and Chamberlain, Peter. Weapons of the Third Reich: An Encyclopedic Survey of All Small Arms, Artillery and Special Weapons of the German Land Forces 1939-1945. New York: Doubleday, 1979 ISBN 0-385-15090-3
- Hogg, Ian V. German Artillery of World War Two. 2nd corrected edition. Mechanicsville, PA: Stackpole Books, 1997 ISBN 1-85367-480-X
