= Bergetiger =

German armored recovery vehicle

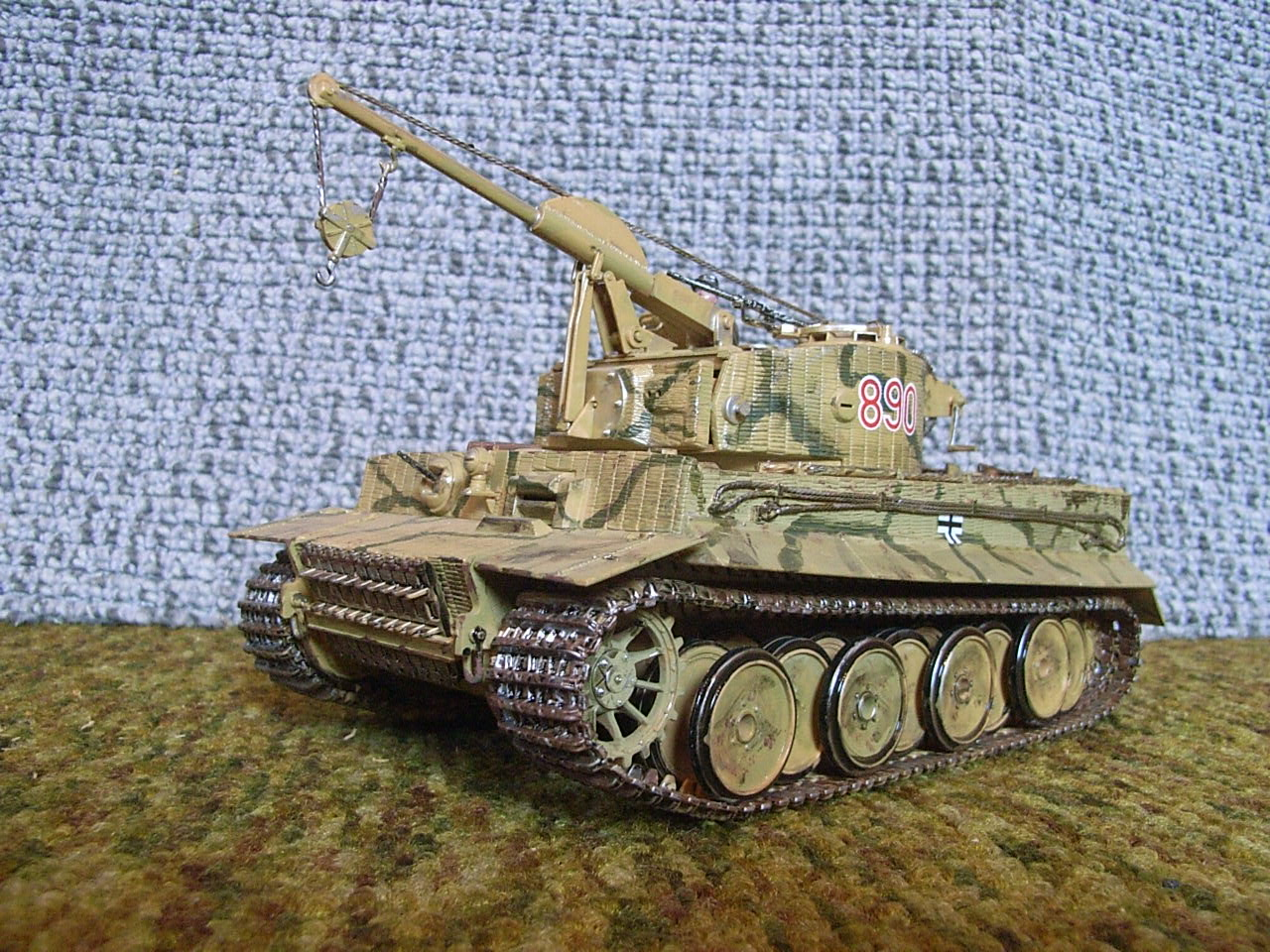
- Toy model of a Bergetiger
- Type: Heavy tank/Military engineering vehicle
- Place of origin: Nazi Germany

Service history
- In service: 1943–1945
- Used by: Nazi Germany
- Wars: World War II

Production history
- Manufacturer: Henschel

Specifications (RfRuK VK 4501H Ausf.E, Blatt: G-330)
- Mass: 54 tonnes (60 short tons)
- Length: 6.316 m (20 ft 8.7 in) 8.45 m (27 ft 9 in) gun forward
- Width: 3.56 m (11 ft 8 in)
- Height: 3.0 m (9 ft 10 in)
- Crew: 5
- Armor: 25–120 mm (0.98–4.72 in)
- Secondary armament: 7.92 mm MG 34; 4,500 rounds
- Engine: Maybach HL230 P45 V-12; 700 PS (690 hp, 515 kW)
- Power/weight: 13 PS/tonne
- Suspension: Torsion bar
- Ground clearance: 0.47 m (1 ft 7 in)
- Fuel capacity: 540 L (140 US gal) including reserve
- Operational range: 110–195 km (68–121 mi)
- Maximum speed: 45.4 km/h (28.2 mph)

The Bergetiger was the name the Allied forces gave to a German World War II armored tracked vehicle based on the Tiger. The vehicle was found abandoned on a roadside in Italy with terminal engine problems. The main gun had been removed, and a boom & winch assembly had been fitted to the turret. No other Tiger tanks modified in this manner were ever recovered.

== Naming ==
At the time the vehicle was found it was assumed the vehicle was intended as a tank recovery vehicle. Germans used the "berge" prefix to denote recovery vehicle versions of tanks, such as the "Bergepanther" and "Bergepanzer". Thus the allies dubbed the vehicle they had found the "Bergetiger". No official German name for this vehicle has ever been located.

== Dispute over purpose ==
The Bergetiger's role as a recovery vehicle has been disputed ever since its discovery. The evidence often cited against it being a recovery vehicle is that its crane was not designed to tow the weight of a tank, nor was it equipped with any other common recovery equipment.

A popular alternate theory is that the vehicle was field-modified (possibly after suffering damage to the main gun) as either a mine-clearing vehicle, or to drop explosives to clear battlefield obstacles.

== Production numbers ==
Reports of the number of Bergetigers produced varies. No original German documentation to support these numbers has been located. Some common numbers given are:

- Fifty-eight produced from the factory
- Three produced from the factory
- Three built as "field-expedient" modifications in Italy
- Three built as "field-expedient" modifications and one built from a Tiger damaged while still at the factory.
- Only one built as a "field-expedient" in Italy
