= List of Panther tank variants =

This is a list of Panther tank variants, including prototypes, conversions and projected designs.

== Production models ==
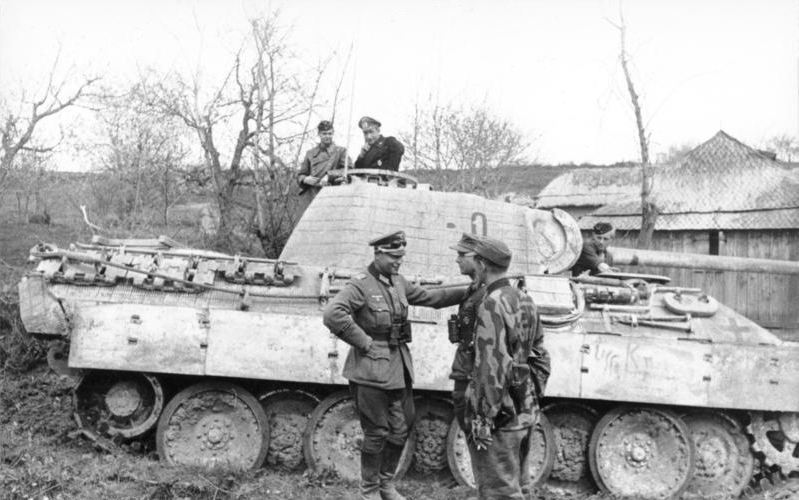
Panzerbefehlswagen Panther Ausf. A (Sd.Kfz. 267) of the Panzergrenadier-Division Großdeutschland photographed in southern Ukraine in 1944.

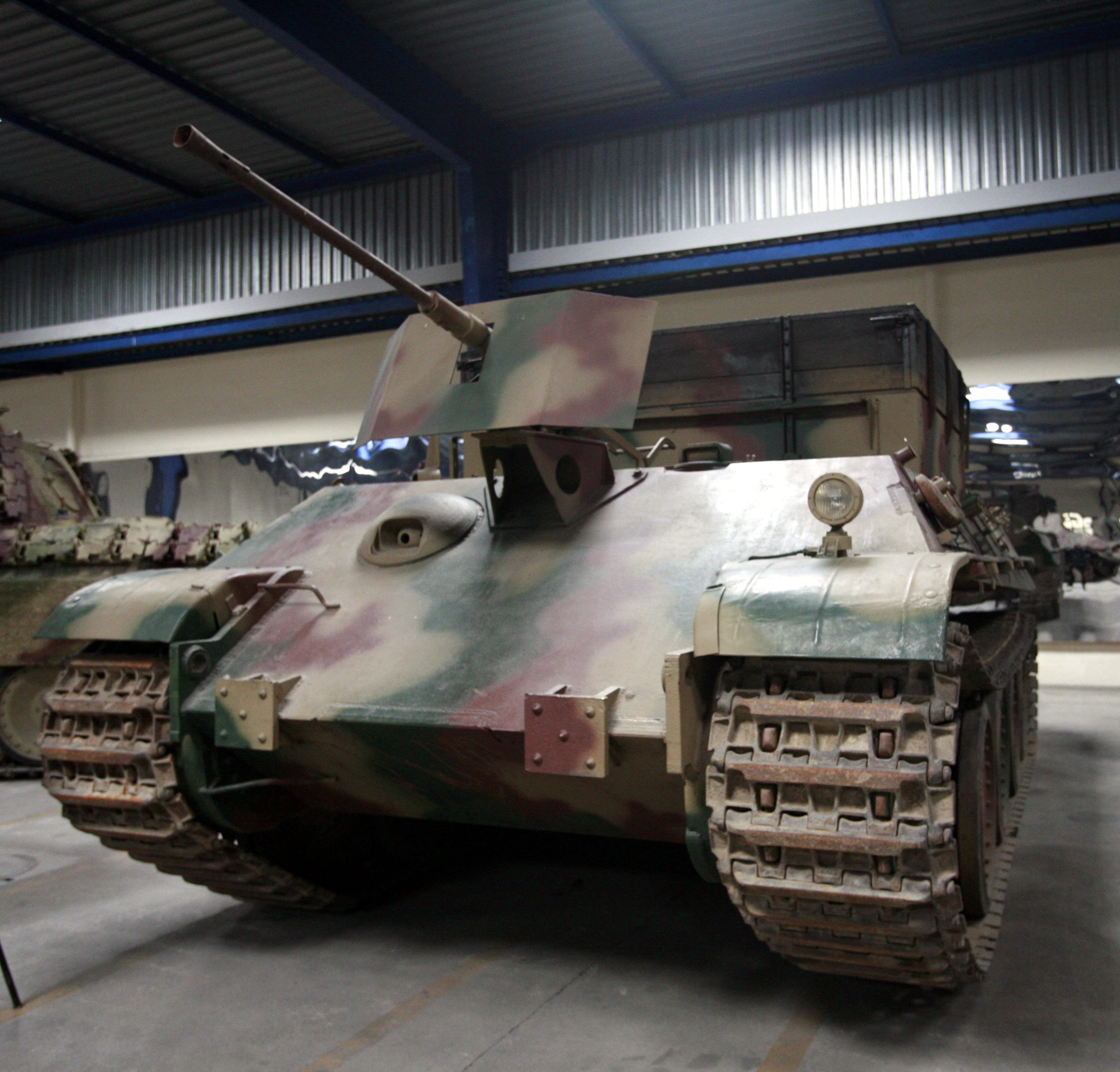
Bergepanther at the Musée des Blindés, Saumur

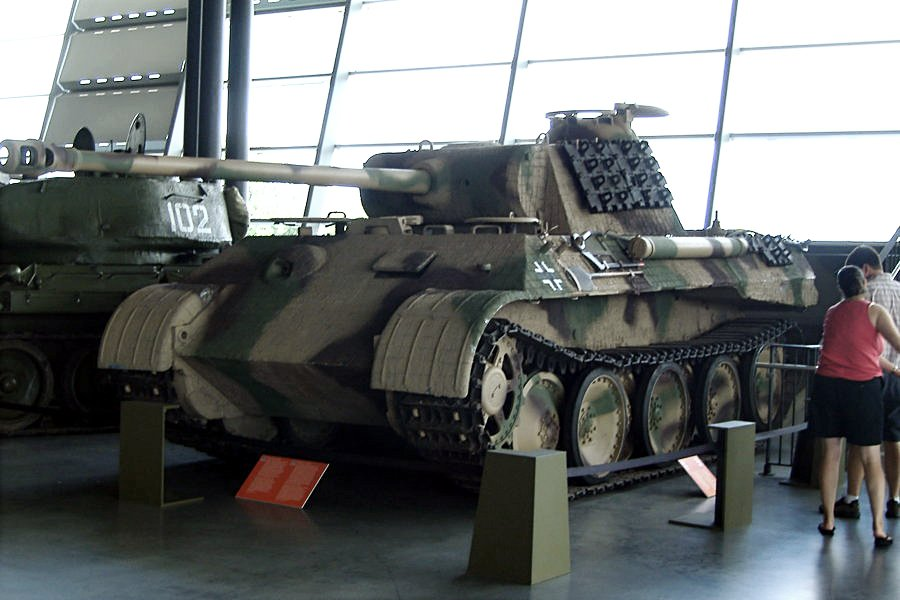
Restored Panther Ausf A on display at the Canadian War Museum, Ottawa.

Ausf. D

The first series of vehicles to enter production series, (despite the designation). 850 built by MAN, Daimler-Benz, MNH and Henschel between January and September 1943.

Ausf. A (Panther I, VK 3002, Sd.Kfz.171)

The second production series, built by MAN, Daimler-Benz, Demag and MNH. 2,000 built between August 1943 to May 1944.

Ausf. G

The third production series, (despite the designation), built by MAN, Daimler-Benz, MNH. 3,126 built between March 1944 to April 1945.

Panzerbefehlswagen mit 7.5 cm KwK 42 L/70

Panzerkampfwagen Panther (Sd.Kfz.171) (als Pz.Bef.Wg.) / Panzerbefehlswagen Panther Ausf. A (Sd.Kfz.267) Command tanks; 329 converted with extra radio equipment and reduced ammunition storage.

Panzerbeobachtungswagen Panther

Artillery observers tank converted from Panther Is by removing the main armament and fitting a dummy gun with a ball fitting for a machine gun on the blanked off turret front. 41 were converted late 1944 - early 1945.

Jagdpanther (Sd.Kfz.173)

Panzerjäger für 8.8cm PaK43 auf Fgst Panther I. A jagdpanzer ("hunting tank") self-propelled anti-tank gun based on the Panther chassis with a 71-calibres long 8.8cm PaK43 gun in a fixed casemate superstructure with limited traverse mounting. 392 built by MIAG and MNH from January 1944 to March 1945.

Panzer-Bergegerät (Panther I) (Sd.Kfz.179)

Bergepanther armoured recovery vehicles using the Panther I chassis. 347 built or converted by Henschel, MAN and Demag.

== Pilot models, prototypes and experimental designs ==
Data from:

VK 30.01 (D)

A prototype for the Panther from Daimler-Benz, closely following the T-34. The MAN design, however, was selected for production.

VK 30.02 (D)

A second prototype for the Panther from Daimler-Benz. The MAN design, however, was selected for production.

Pz.Kpfw.V Ausf. F neuer Art

Development of the Schmalturm (small turret) was underway at the end of the war with prototype turrets completed. The Schmalturm was to have been fitted to the Ausf.F and the Panther II.

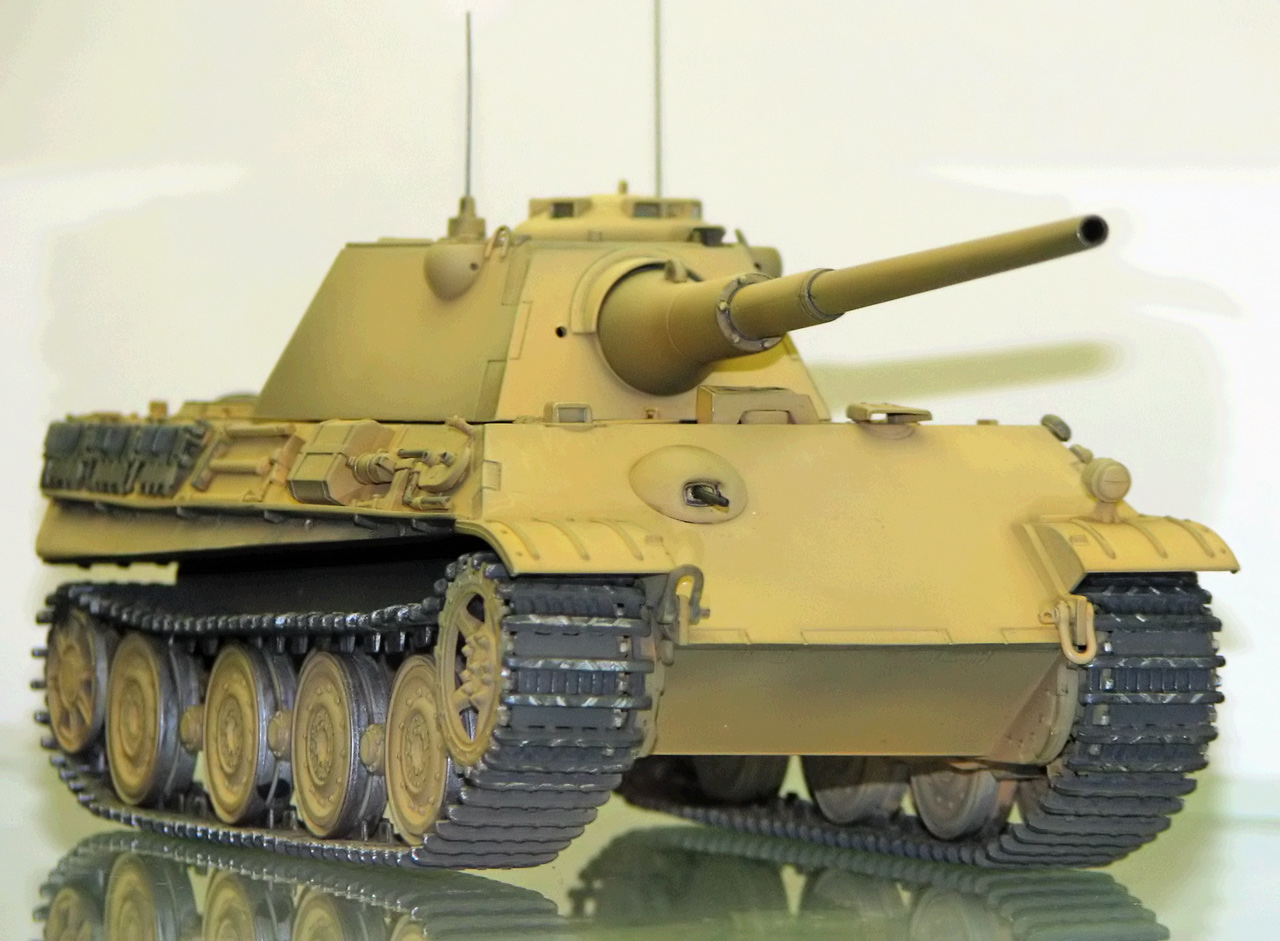
Model of Panther II (with 80 cm diameter Tiger II wheels and transport tracks) with proposed Schmalturm, with a stereoscopic sight bulge on each turret side

Panzerkampfwagen Panther II

An up-armoured Panther with revised suspension. Only two prototypes were completed before the end of the war and the Panther II was superseded by the E-50.

Geschützwagen Panther für sFH18/4 (Sf) (Gerät 811)

A weapon carrier / self-propelled artillery with de-mountable 15cm sFH18/4 heavy field howitzer. The sole prototype was completed by Daimler-Benz just before the war ended in 1945.

Jagdpanther Starr

A tank destroyer with rigidly mounted 8.8cm PaK43/1 L/71 under development by Krupp at war's end.

Sturmpanther

A projected assault tank mounting a 15 cm StuH43/1, the same gun as used on the Panzer IV based Brummbär. Production was not started before the war ended.

Flakpanther 8.8 cm

Designs were laid for a Flakpanther mounting an 8.8cm FlaK 41 in an armoured turret.

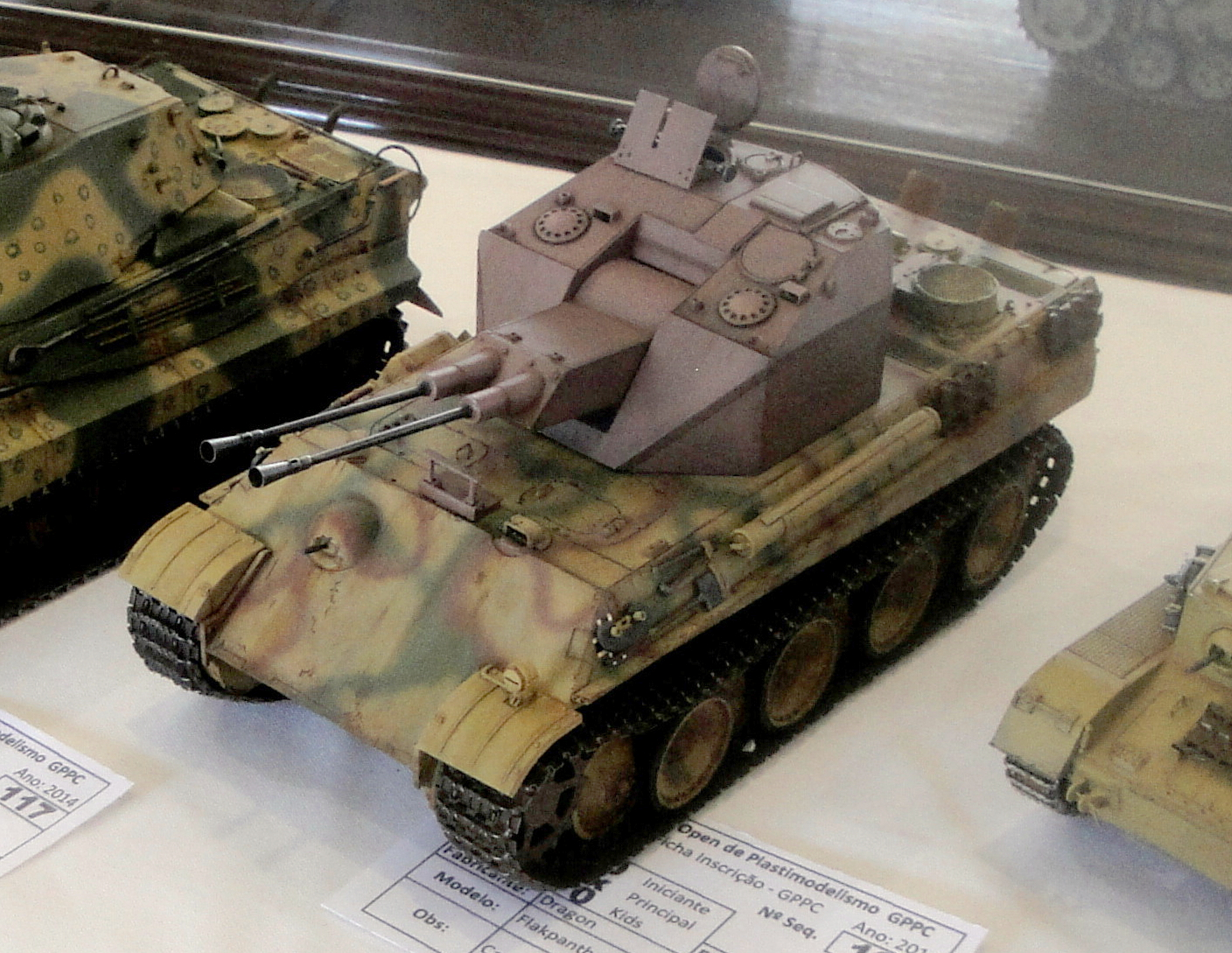
Model of Flakpanzer Coelian

Flakzwilling 3.7 cm auf Panther Fahrgestell "Flakpanzer Coelian" (Gerät 554)

A Flakpanzer project started in December 1943 mounting a double 3.7 cm FlaK 43 in an armored turret. At least one wooden mock-up was completed but production was delayed repeatedly.

Flakzwilling 5.5 cm Coelian "Mammut"

An upgrade to the Flakpanzer Coelian mounting a dual 5.5 cm Flakzwilling.

Gerät 5-1028

A Rheinmetall weapon carrier design mounting a 10.5 cm leFH 18 field howitzer on a chassis derived from the Panther.

Gerät 5-1211

A Krupp weapon carrier design mounting a 12.8 cm Kanone 43.

Gerät 5-1213 "Skorpion"

A Rheinmetall weapon carrier design mounting a 12.8 cm Kanone 43.

Gerät 5-1228

A Krupp weapon carrier design mounting a 15 cm sFH 18. field howitzer
