= Bergepanther =

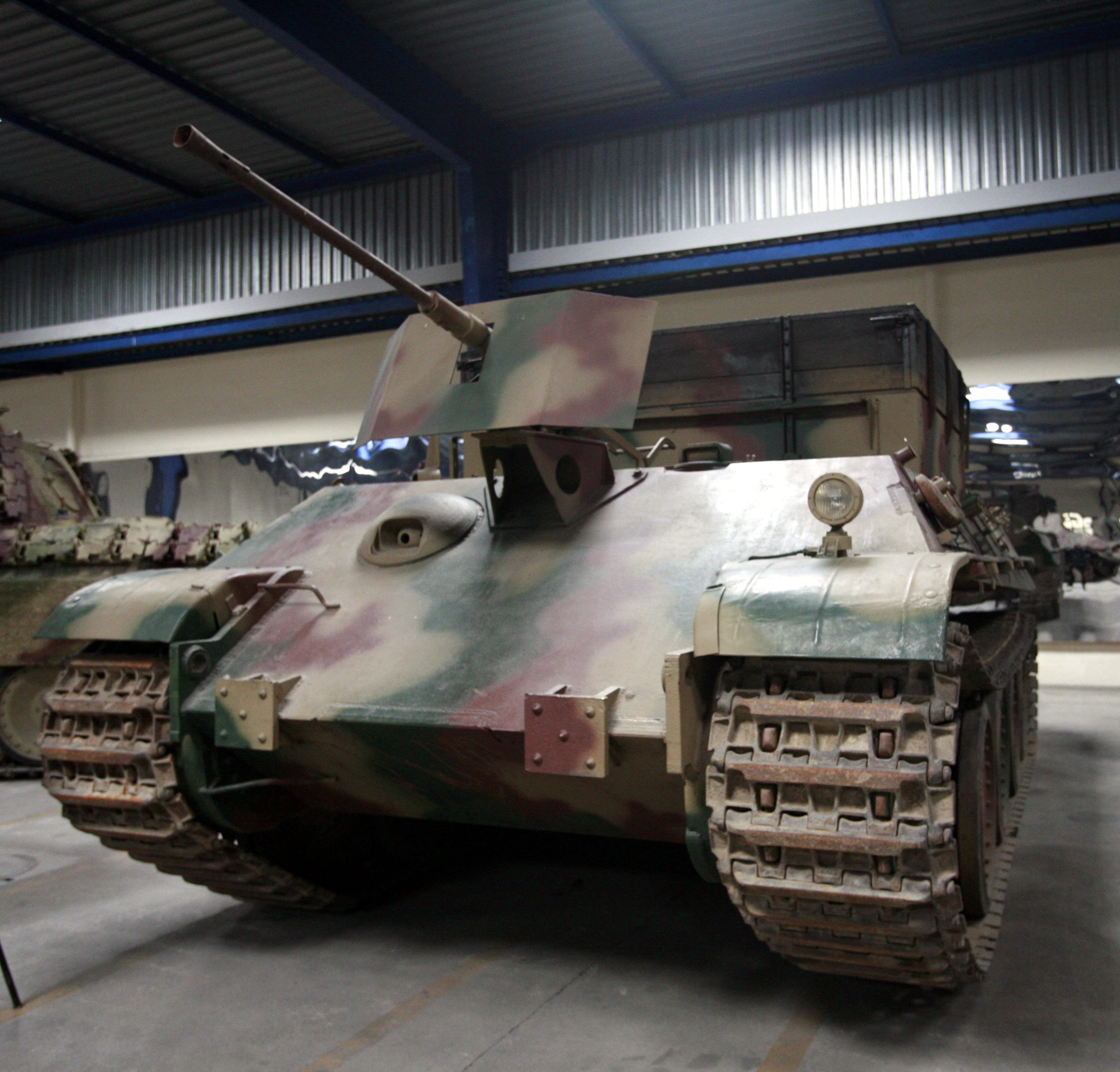
- A Bergepanther displayed in the Musée des Blindés
- Type: Armoured recovery vehicle
- Place of origin: Nazi Germany

Service history
- In service: 1943–1945
- Used by: Wehrmacht
- Wars: Second World War

Production history
- Produced: 1943-1945
- No. built: 339

Specifications
- Mass: 43 tonnes (47 short tons; 42 long tons)
- Length: 8.86 m (29 ft 1 in)
- Width: 3.42 m (11 ft 3 in)
- Height: 2.7 m (8 ft 10 in)
- Crew: 5
- Main armament: 1 × 2 cm KwK 38 L/55 autocannon
- Secondary armament: 1 × 7.92 mm MG 42 machine gun
- Engine: Maybach HL 230 12-cylinder gasoline engine 700 horsepower (520 kW)
- Power/weight: 19 hp/tonne
- Operational range: 200 mi (320 km)
- Maximum speed: 55 km/h (34 mph) maximum

The Bergepanzerwagen V (Sd.Kfz. 179), often referred to as the "Bergepanther", was an armoured recovery vehicle used by the German Army in WWII. It was a variant of the Panzerkampfwagen V Panther (Sd.Kfz. 171).

== Development and production ==
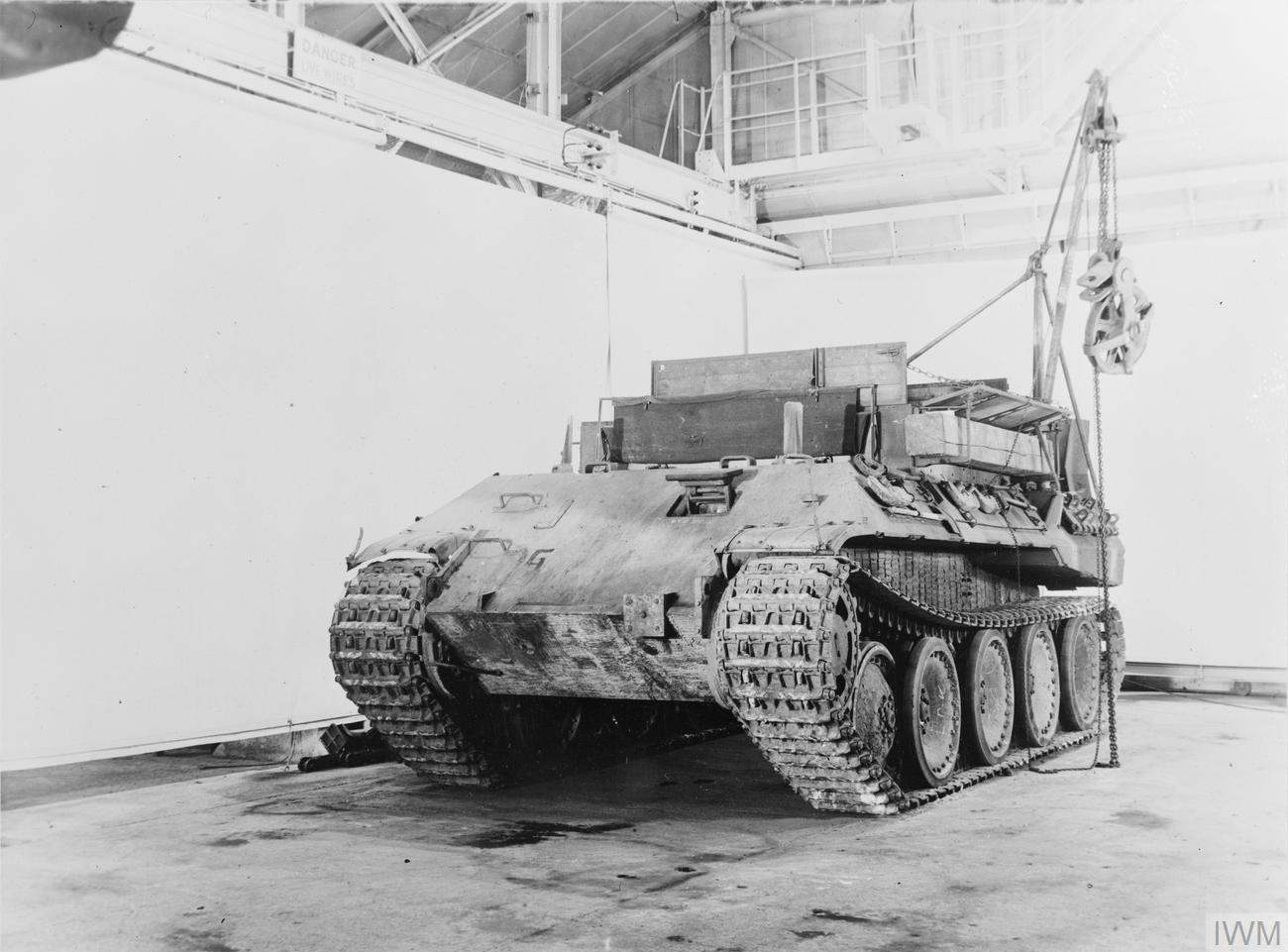
Bergepanther (Front view)

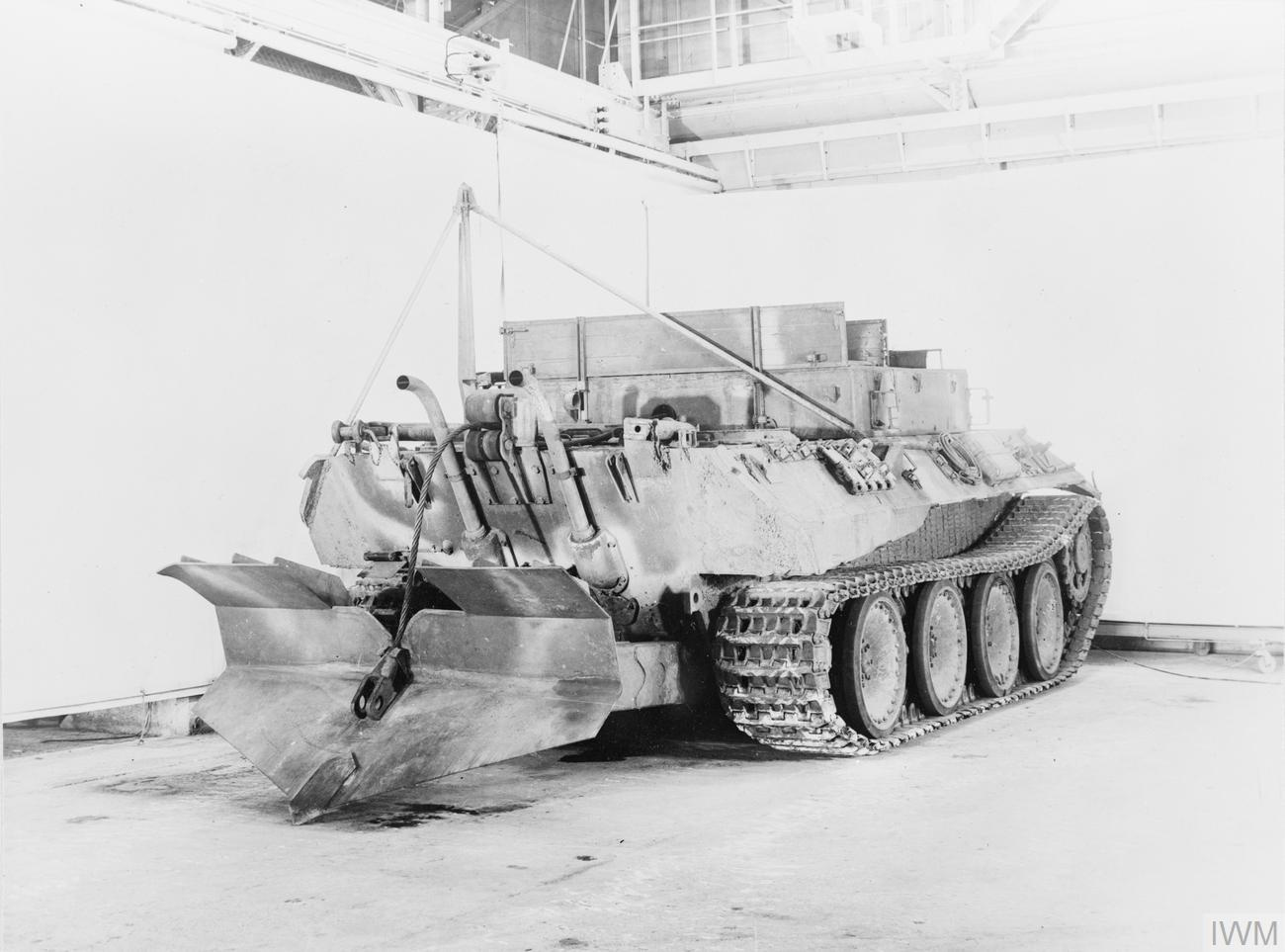
Quarter view (Rear)

The idea of a Bergepanther came about in 1943 because of problems with the recovery of heavy and medium tanks. The development was carried out by MAN. The half-track vehicles used up to then for recovery (e.g. Sd.Kfz. 9) were rarely able to successfully recover a Panther or a Tiger; towing with another Tiger or Panther was strictly forbidden as this could lead to the loss of both tanks.

The first Bergepanthers were almost completed Panthers ( Ausf. D variant), for which MAN only omitted the turret. Henschel, Daimler-Benz and DEMAG later took on the production one after the other. The specially produced hull of the Bergepanther was largely similar to that of the Panther tank, although the modifications of the Ausf. G were adopted for it at the end of 1944. The crew consisted of at least three soldiers, with the device being operated by two soldiers in the vehicle.

Square wooden and metal structures replaced the turret, and a winch with 40 tonnes-force (392 kilonewtons) capacity was installed in the hull of the tank. The Bergepanther also had a simple crane boom with a load capacity of 1.5 tonnes-force.

The Bergepanther was quite reliable in its area of responsibility and, thanks to its armour, could also be used under enemy fire. Even the heavy Tiger I and its variants could be recovered without any problems by a Bergepanther with a winch.

After the Second World War, the British described the Bergepanther as "usable" based on their own experiments.

In addition to the on-board machine gun, which could be attached to supports to the right or left of the combat area, the Bergepanther received a bow mount to accommodate a 2 cm KwK 30 automatic cannon. However, it was already obsolete in the course of 1944. With the conversion to the hull shape of the Panther G, the Bergepanther received the usual MG ball cover on the radio operator's side. The machine-gun support on the driver's side was also omitted.

From 1943 to 1945 around 339 Bergepanther of all designs were produced by the companies MAN, Henschel, Daimler-Benz (Berlin-Marienfelde plant) and DEMAG.

Of the vehicles designated as a Bergepanther, around 297 Bergepanthers were built from September 1943 onwards with the special Panther tub, which enabled the cable winch and the spur to be accommodated. Of these 297 Bergepanthers, at least 88 were delivered without a winch and spur. Apart from the 42 vehicles called Bergepanther up to September 1943, which were essentially only Panther Ausf. D hulls as tugs, Seibert Stahlbau in Aschaffenburg carried out the conversion of damaged Ausf. Ds to Bergepanthers from August 1944 to March 1945. These vehicles also had neither a winch nor a spur and thus resembled the first Bergepanthers from MAN and Henschel. The cover with the hatch covers for the driver and radio operator had been omitted. They were provided with all other recovery equipment and tools that could also be found on the Bergepanther. The Seibert company produced approximately 61 Umbau-Bergepanthers. Around 113 vehicles from the repair work were delivered.

The vehicles referred to as Bergepanther were mostly just turretless tow vehicles that were delivered until the end of the war. Furthermore, a significant part of the Bergepanthers with the special tub for winch and spur attachment were probably only used as a towing vehicle due to the lack of winches. These facts, which only became publicly known in 2013 through the latest publication on the subject of Bergepanthers, may have contributed to the fact that "early" Bergepanthers were incorrectly identified in various earlier publications, including photos from the end of the war.

== See also ==
- List of Panzer V variants
