= Char de dépannage DNG/DCL =

French armored recovery vehicle

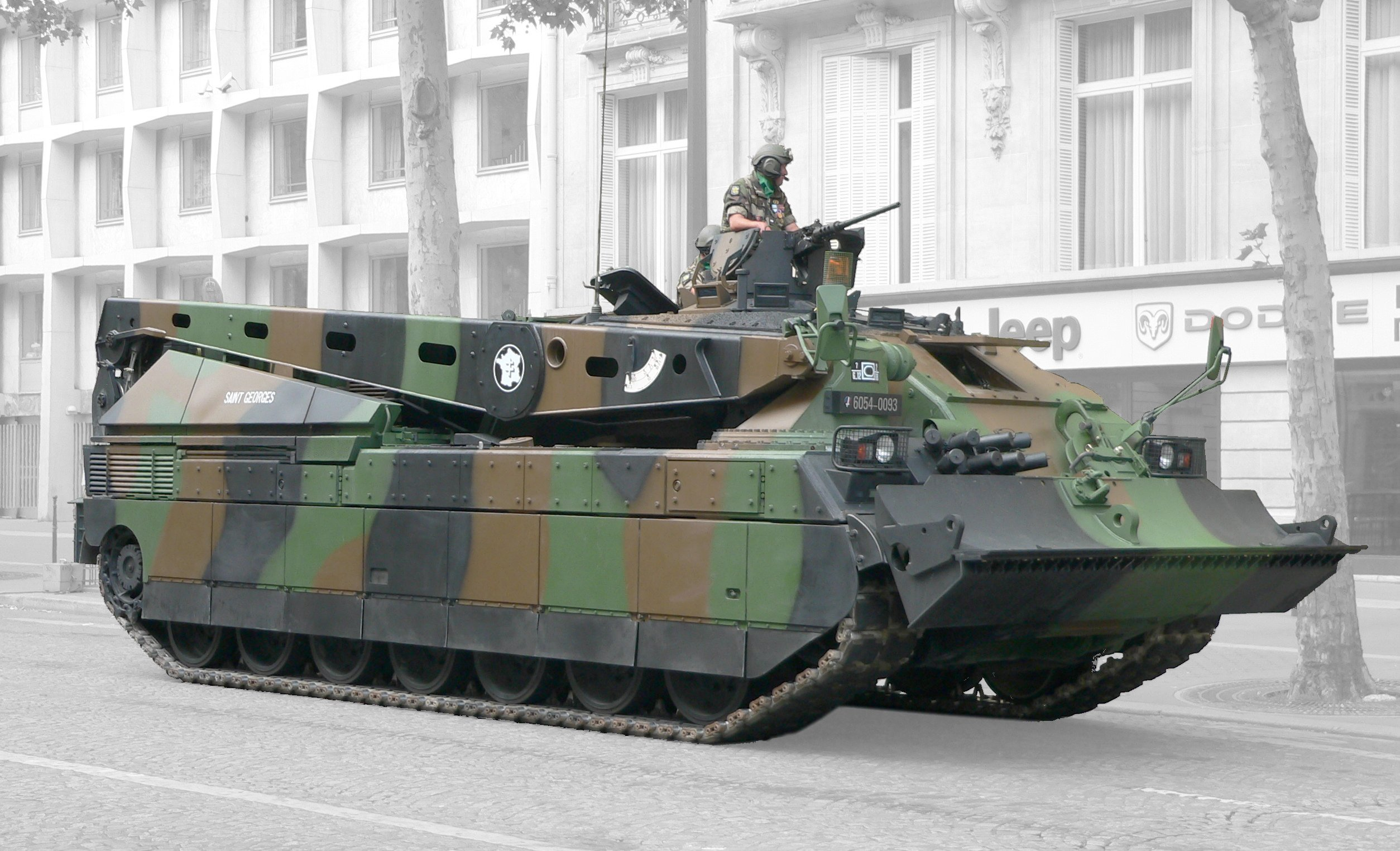
- DCL during the military parade of 14 July 2006 in Paris
- Type: Armoured recovery vehicle
- Place of origin: France

Service history
- Used by: France; UAE

Production history
- Designer: Nexter
- Designed: 1991
- Manufacturer: Nexter
- Produced: 1994-2000s
- No. built: 66

Specifications
- Mass: 59 tonnes
- Length: 9.15 m
- Width: 3.40 m
- Height: 2.60 m
- Crew: 3
- Armour: cab armored to protect against small-arms fire up to 14,5 mm
- Main armament: 1× 12.7 mm machine gun 20× smoke dischargers
- Engine: MTU MT 883 Ka-500 V12 turbocompressed diesel engine 1500 hp
- Power/weight: 25.4 hp/tonne
- Transmission: Renk HSWL 295TM
- Suspension: Oleopneumatic suspension
- Operational range: 700 km
- Maximum speed: 65 km/h

The Char de dépannage DNG/DCL is an armoured recovery vehicle built upon the chassis of the Leclerc battle tank.

The DCL comes as a replacement for the AMX-30 D in the role of a recovery and repair tank for battle tanks over 50 tonnes. Nexter designates it DNG (Dépanneur Nouvelle Génération, "next generation repair"); the French Army uses the term DCL (Dépanneur du Char Leclerc, "Leclerc tank repair").

The main role of the DCL is tugging disabled tanks out of a battle zone; its secondary roles include repairing damaged tanks, and helping in military engineering. For these roles, it is fitted with a crane which allows removing a tank turret, and a bulldozer blade.

20 DCL are currently in service in the French Army. One is deployed in South Lebanon in support of the 13 Leclerc tanks of the UNIFIL. 46 DCL are in service in the United Arab Emirates.

== Equipment ==
- Main winch: 180m long, 35 tonnes tugging
- Secondary winch: 230m, 1.3 tonne
- Crane: 30 tonnes lifting
- 3.4 metre bulldozer blade
- Diesel generator
- 20 DREB smoke generators
- 1 x 12.7 mm machine gun

== Notes and references ==
- GIAT
- chars-francais.net
