= Gebirgsflak 38 =

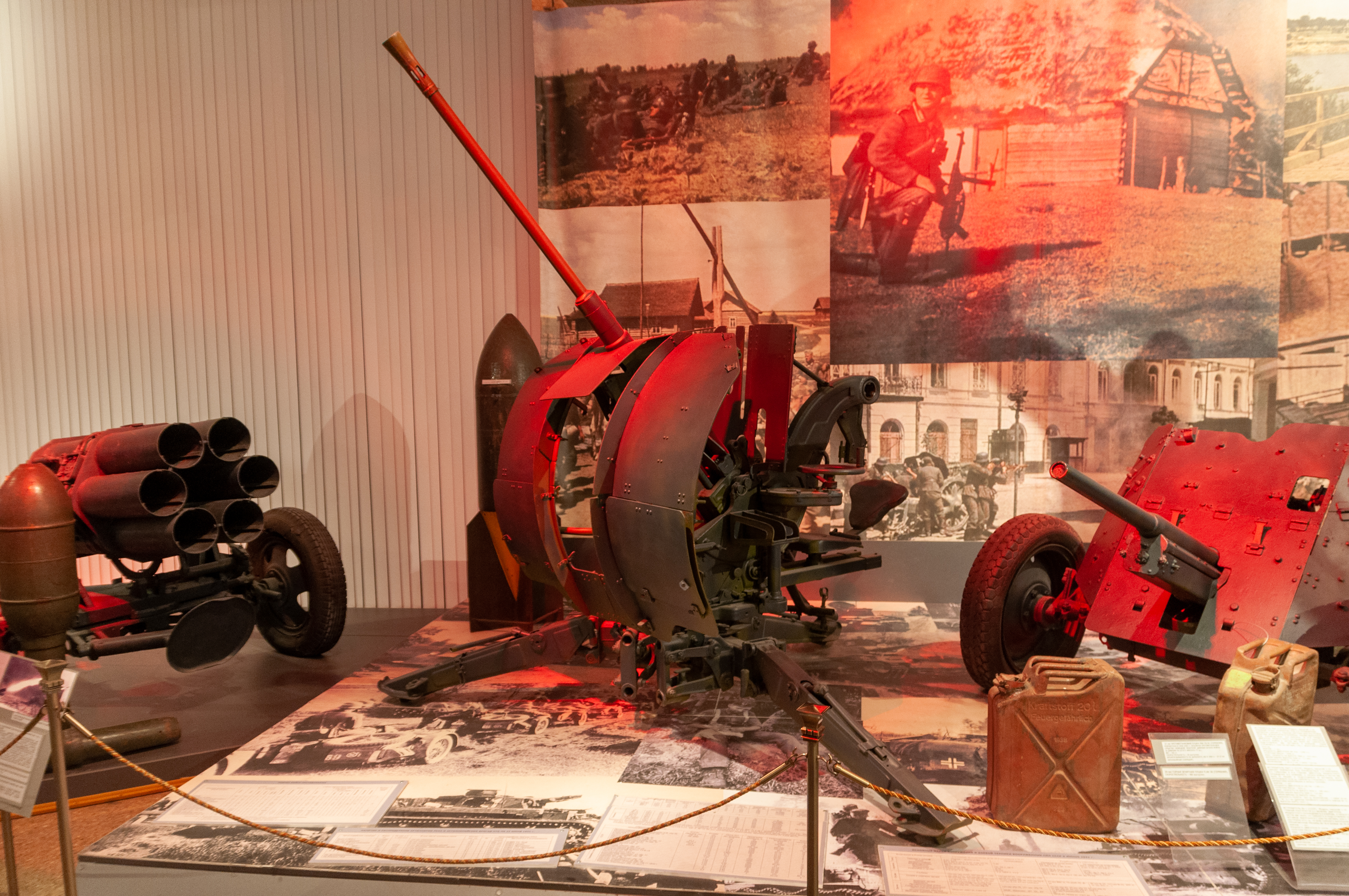
- Deployed Gebirgsflak 38 in Central Armed Forces Museum in Moscow
- Type: Anti-Aircraft Gun
- Place of origin: Nazi Germany

Service history
- In service: 1942
- Used by: Nazi Germany
- Wars: Second World War

Production history
- Designed: 1938
- Manufacturer: Mauser
- Produced: 1941 - ???

Specifications
- Mass: 360 Kg
- Length: 143 in (363.2 cm)
- Width: 47 in (119.4 cm)
- Height: 50–57 in (1.3–1.4 m) traveling, 31–42 in (0.79–1.07 m) mounted
- Crew: 4
- Shell: 20×138mmB
- Caliber: 20 mm
- Elevation: -20°to ±90°
- Traverse: 360°
- Rate of fire: 450 rounds/min (cyclic); 220 rpm (practical)
- Muzzle velocity: 900 metres/second
- Maximum firing range: 2200 m
- Feed system: 20-round box magazine

The Gebirgsflak 38 was a German anti-aircraft weapon of World War II, a lightweight version of the 2 cm FlaK 38 designed for airborne and mountain troops as a dual-purpose gun for use against air and ground targets. The main difference was that the carriage was smaller and lighter than the carriage for the FlaK 38. The gun and carriage were designed to allow the weapon to be broken into several pack loads for transport. The carriage has two wheels and when raised the gun has a 360° traverse. Unlike the Flak 38, the light carriage is not designed for high towing speeds.

The Gebirgsflak 38 was fired using a foot pedal on the right front of the flak mount. The gunlayer's seat was mounted behind the gun and rotated with the mount in traverse. Elevating and traversing of the gun were manual using handwheels located on the right and left sides of the mount respectively. There are two speeds, high and low, in both elevating and traversing.
