= Armoured recovery vehicle =

Armoured vehicle for towing in combat conditions

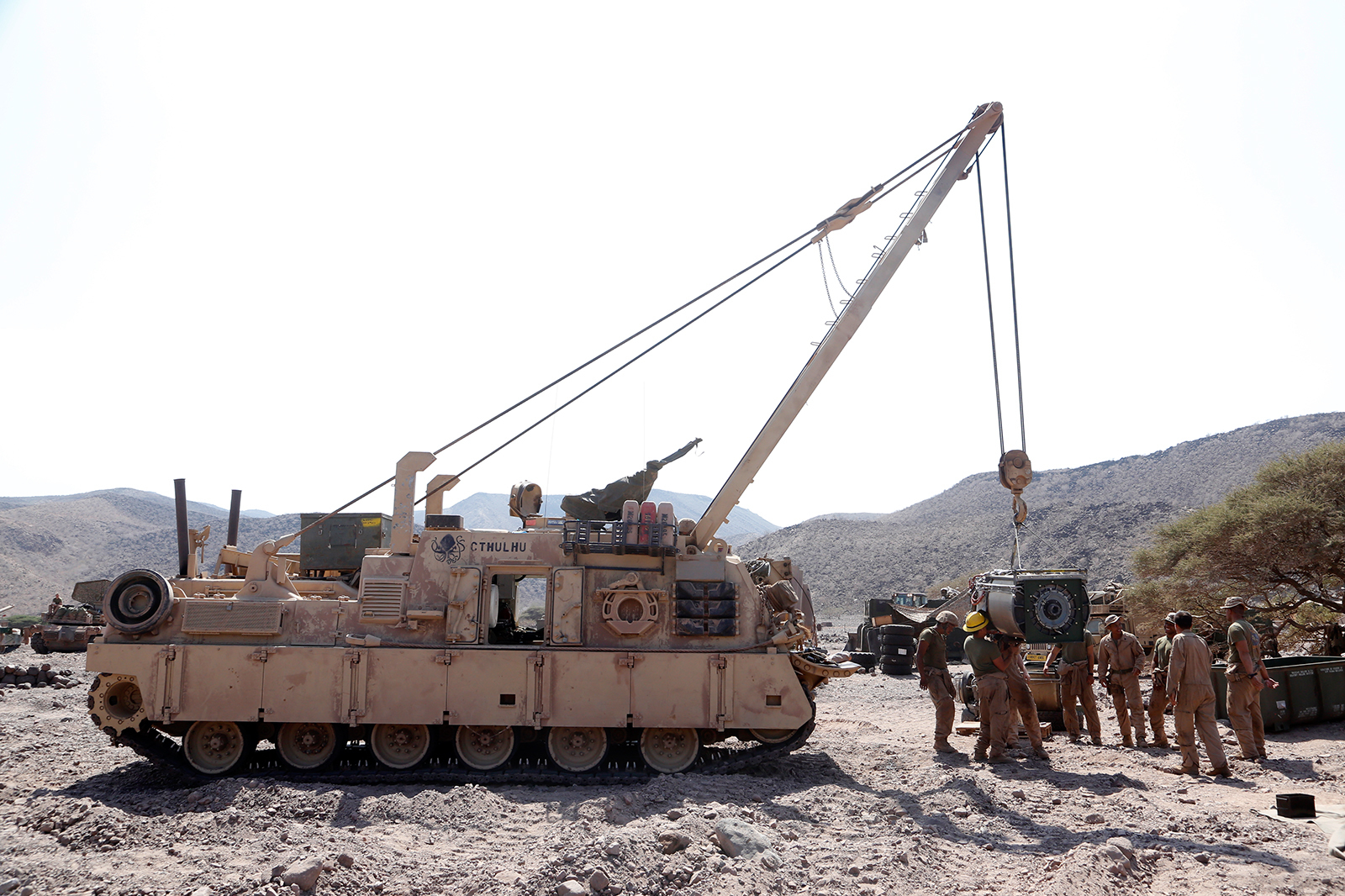
A US Marine Corps M88A2 Hercules in 2014, lifting an M1 Abrams engine with its crane.

An armoured recovery vehicle (ARV) is typically a powerful tank or armoured personnel carrier (APC) chassis modified for use during combat for military vehicle recovery (towing) or repair of battle-damaged, stuck, and/or inoperable armoured fighting vehicles, such as tanks and armoured personnel carriers. Most ARVs have motorized tracks, like a tank or bulldozer, enabling the ARV to operate on uneven ground. The term "armoured repair and recovery vehicle" (ARRV) is also used.

ARVs may have winches, jibs, cranes, and/or bulldozer blades to aid in tank recovery. Typically, any specialized lifting and recovery equipment replaces the turret and cannon found on a battle tank. ARVs may in some cases have electric generators, blowtorches, chainsaws and fuel pumps to help with recovery operations, or spare parts, to facilitate field repairs. Some ARVs have a spade component to anchor the vehicle when it is towing or lifting. Since most ARVs are based on tank or APC chassis, they have an armoured crew cockpit and engine, which means that ARVs can be operated in combat conditions. Rarely, an ARV may be armed, such as some M32s, which have an 81 mm mortar for screening purposes, and the M88, which has a .50 cal heavy machine gun. One WWII M4 Sherman-based ARV had a dummy gun installed where the turret would normally go.

Early ARVs in WWII were often repurposed tanks, with the turret and armament removed and replaced with some type of winch. In the 2010s, ARVs are generally factory-built. Even so, ARVs often use a shared chassis that is used on an army's other fighting vehicles, as this facilitates repair and maintenance of the ARV (since the same parts can be used on the ARV and the vehicles it supports).

Some ARVs are operated in tandem with armoured bulldozers. ARVs generally can only tow an equivalent-class vehicle or one that is lighter in weight. As such, an APC chassis-based ARV can only tow and recover an APC, but not a much heavier tank. While most ARVs are made from or based on APC or tank chassis, more rarely, an ARV may be based on an artillery tractor chassis. Some ARVs have specialized equipment that enables them to operate on beaches or in shallow water.

== Development history ==
=== Early models ===
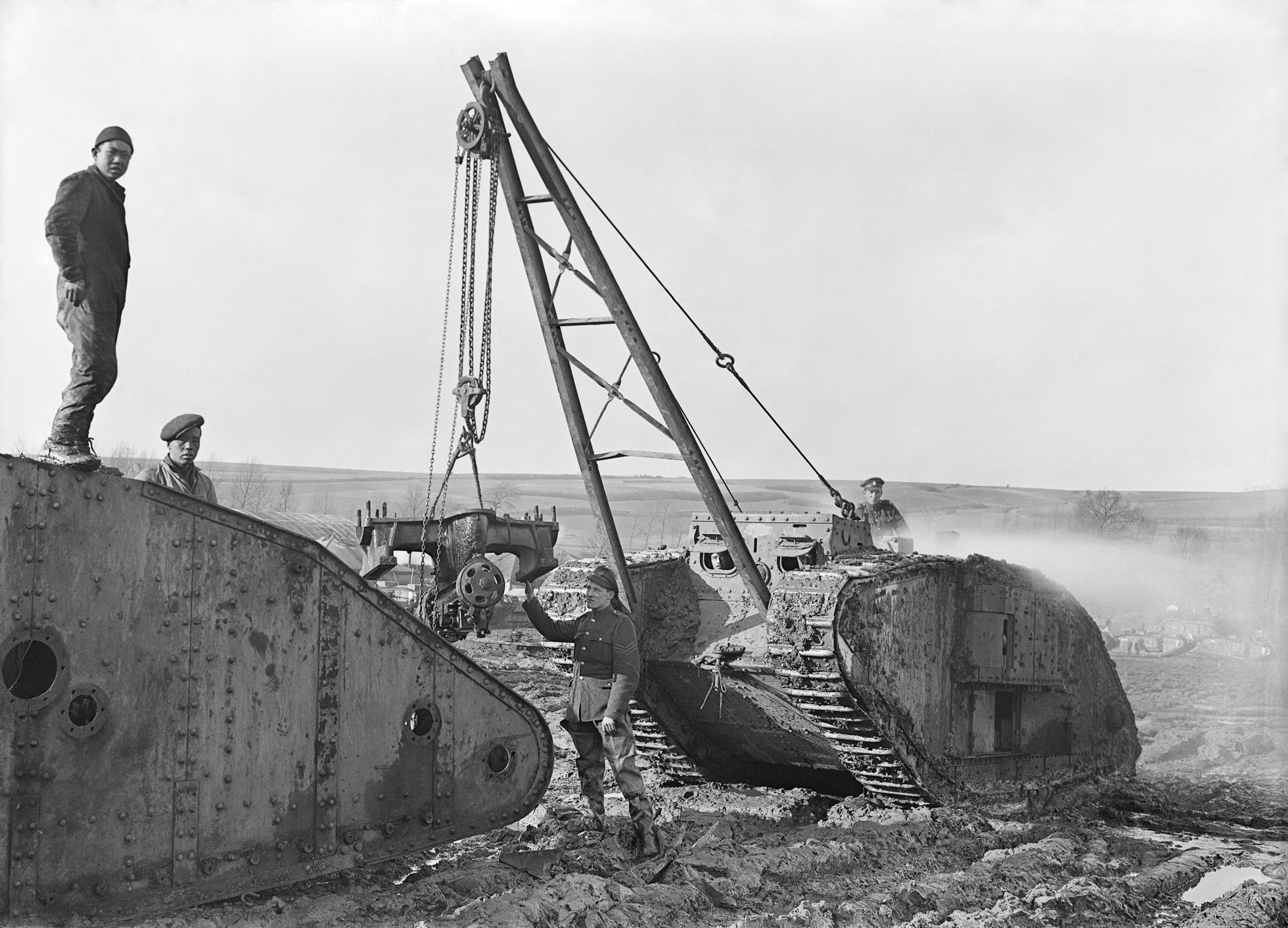
Chinese Labour Corps men and British soldiers removing parts from a Mark IV tank at the Central Stores of the Tank Corps, Teneur, spring 1918.

During World War I, some British Mark IV heavy tanks were fitted with jibs to produce "salvage tanks", but the majority of their work was at the tank parks in aid of moving, maintaining, and repairing damaged tanks.

=== Second World War ===
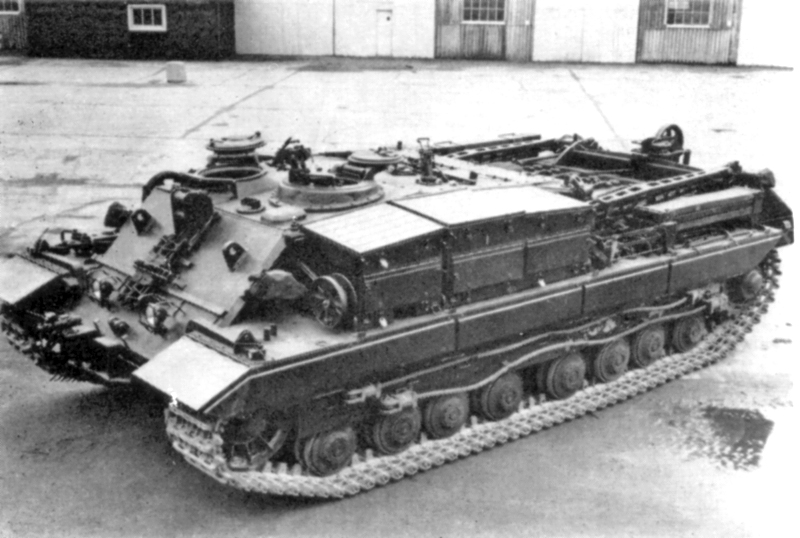
British Conqueror armoured recovery vehicle 2

The first true ARVs were introduced in World War II, often by converting obsolete or damaged tanks, usually by removing the turret and installing a heavy-duty winch to free stuck vehicles, plus a variety of vehicle repair tools. Some were also purpose-built in factories, using an existing tank chassis with a hull superstructure to accommodate repair and recovery equipment. Many of the latter type of ARV had an A-frame or crane to allow the vehicle's crew to perform heavy lifting tasks, such as removing the engine from a disabled tank.

=== Postwar ===
After World War II, most countries' MBT models also had corresponding ARV variants. Many ARVs are also equipped with a bulldozer blade that can be used as an anchor when winching or as a stabiliser when lifting, a pump to transfer fuel to another vehicle, and more. Some can even carry a spare engine for field replacement, such as the German Leopard 1 ARV.

== Characteristics and roles ==
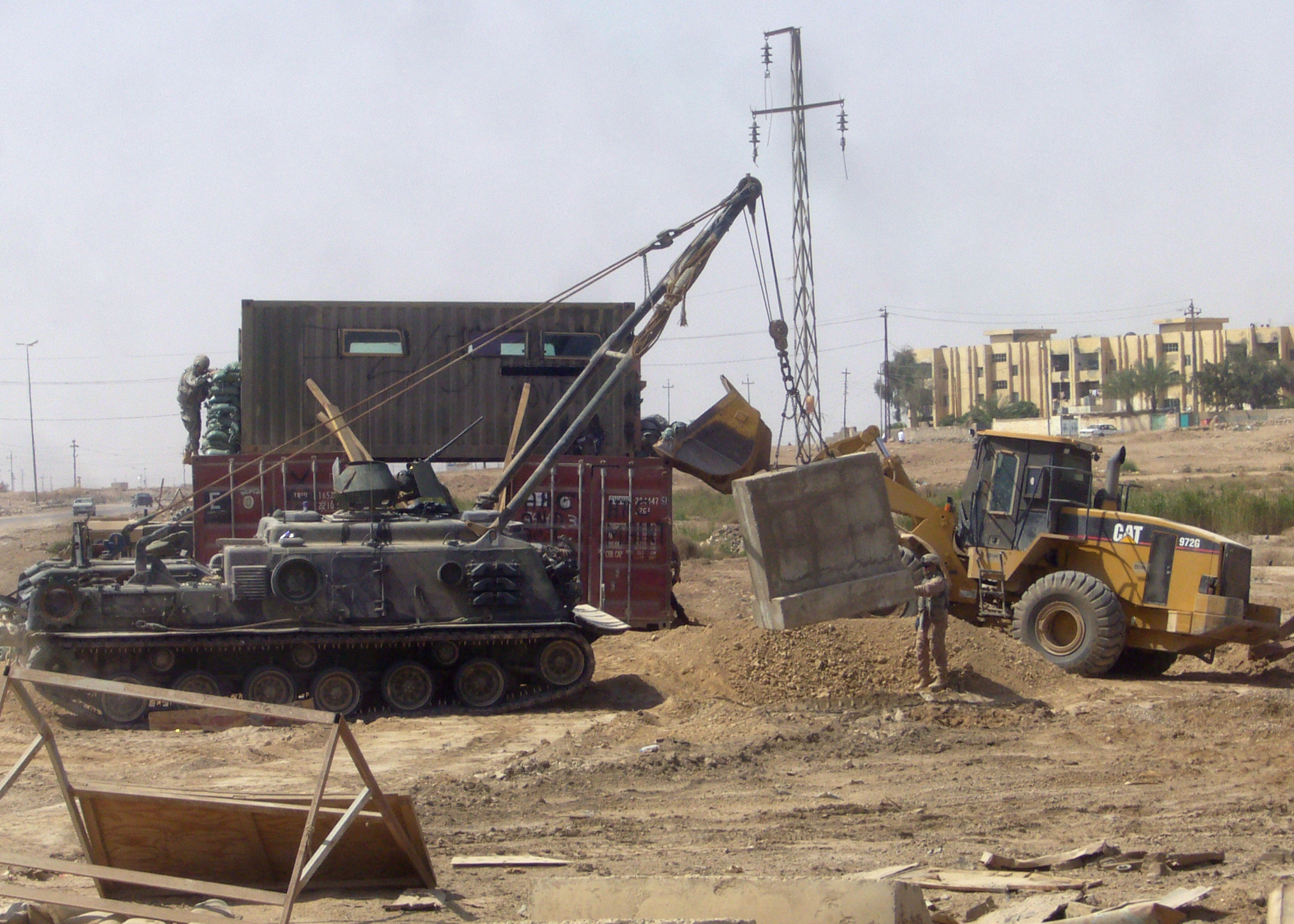
An ARV crane can also be used to lift concrete fortifications and other battlefield engineering tasks.

ARVs are normally built on the chassis of a main battle tank (MBT), but some are also constructed on the basis of other armoured fighting vehicles, mostly armoured personnel carriers (APCs). ARVs are usually built on the basis of a vehicle in the same class as they are supposed to recover; a tank-based ARV is used to recover tanks, while an APC-based one recovers APCs (it does not have the power to tow a much heavier tank). ARVs with a crane can be used to lift and place concrete fortifications in place and help with other battlefield engineering.

Some combat engineering vehicles (CEVs) are based on ARVs.

== List ==
The following is a list of ARVs by country, either designer/manufacturer or user.

=== Argentina ===
- TAM VCRT, based on Tanque Argentino Mediano

=== Austria ===
- SB-20 Greif, based on SK-105 Kürassier

=== Canada ===
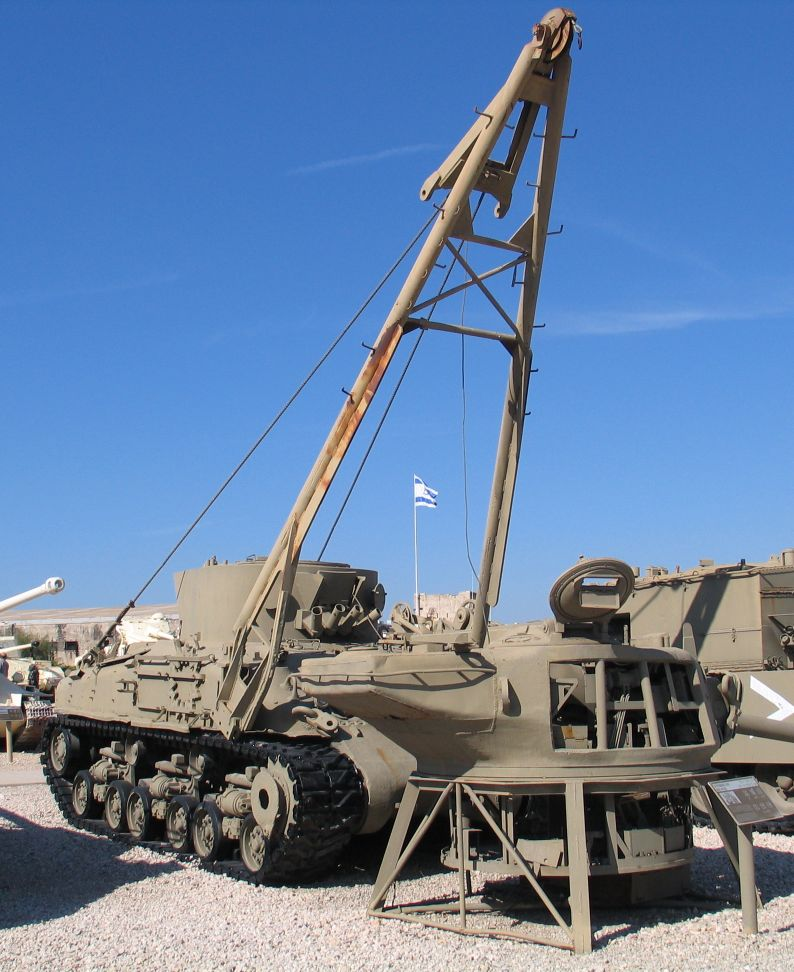
M32 TRV, Yad La-Shiryon Museum, Israel

- Ram ARV (WWII)
- AVGP Husky (1976–present)
- MTVR (-present)
- Bison MRV(-present)
- Leopard 2 ARV (-present)

=== Czechoslovakia ===
- VT-34 ARV, based on T-34 chassis
- JT-34 crane tank, based on T-34 chassis
- VT-55A/KS ARV, based on T-55 chassis
- VT-72B ARV, based on T-72 chassis – (1987 to 1989)
- VPV Brem-Tch, based on BVP-1 chassis (Czech build BMP) – (1985 to 1989)

=== Denmark ===
- Wisent 1 ARV based on the Bergepanzer – Leopard 1 tank

=== France ===
- M32 tank recovery vehicle, based on the Sherman tank (from 1944)
- M74 tank recovery vehicle (1954–1975)
- AMX 30 D (from 1973), based on the AMX 30
- Char de dépannage DNG/DCL, based on the AMX-56 Leclerc

=== Indonesia ===
- AMX-D
- Anoa ARV – Indonesian recovery/engineering vehicle based on Anoa APCs featuring a 12-ton telescopic crane, 6-ton winch, chainsaw, blow torch and an electric generator.
- Bergepanzer 3 "Büffel" – Leopard 2 chassis
- BREM-Ch
- BREM-L
- M32 tank recovery vehicle
- M113A1-B-Rec – recovery vehicle with a heavy internal winch. Similar to M806. Supplied by Sabiex, Belgium.
- M113A1-B-MTC – Maintenance vehicle with hydraulic HIAB crane. Similar to the M579. Supplied by Sabiex, Belgium.
- Stormer Recovery

=== Japan ===
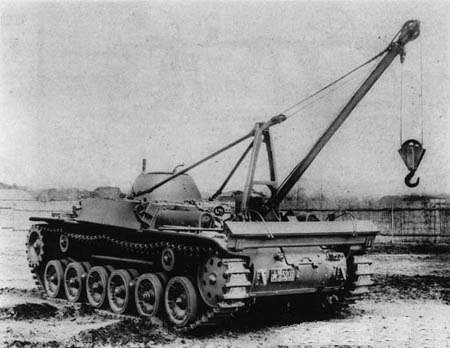
Armoured recovery vehicle Se-Ri

World War II

- Se-Ri armoured recovery vehicle – Type 97 Chi-Ha modified tank chassis

Modern

- Type 70 tank recovery vehicle – Type 61 Roku-ichi tank chassis
- Type 78 tank recovery vehicle – Type 74 Nana-yon tank chassis
- Type 90 tank recovery vehicle – Type 90 Kyū-maru tank chassis
- Type 11 tank recovery vehicle – Type 10 Hito-maru tank chassis

=== Germany ===
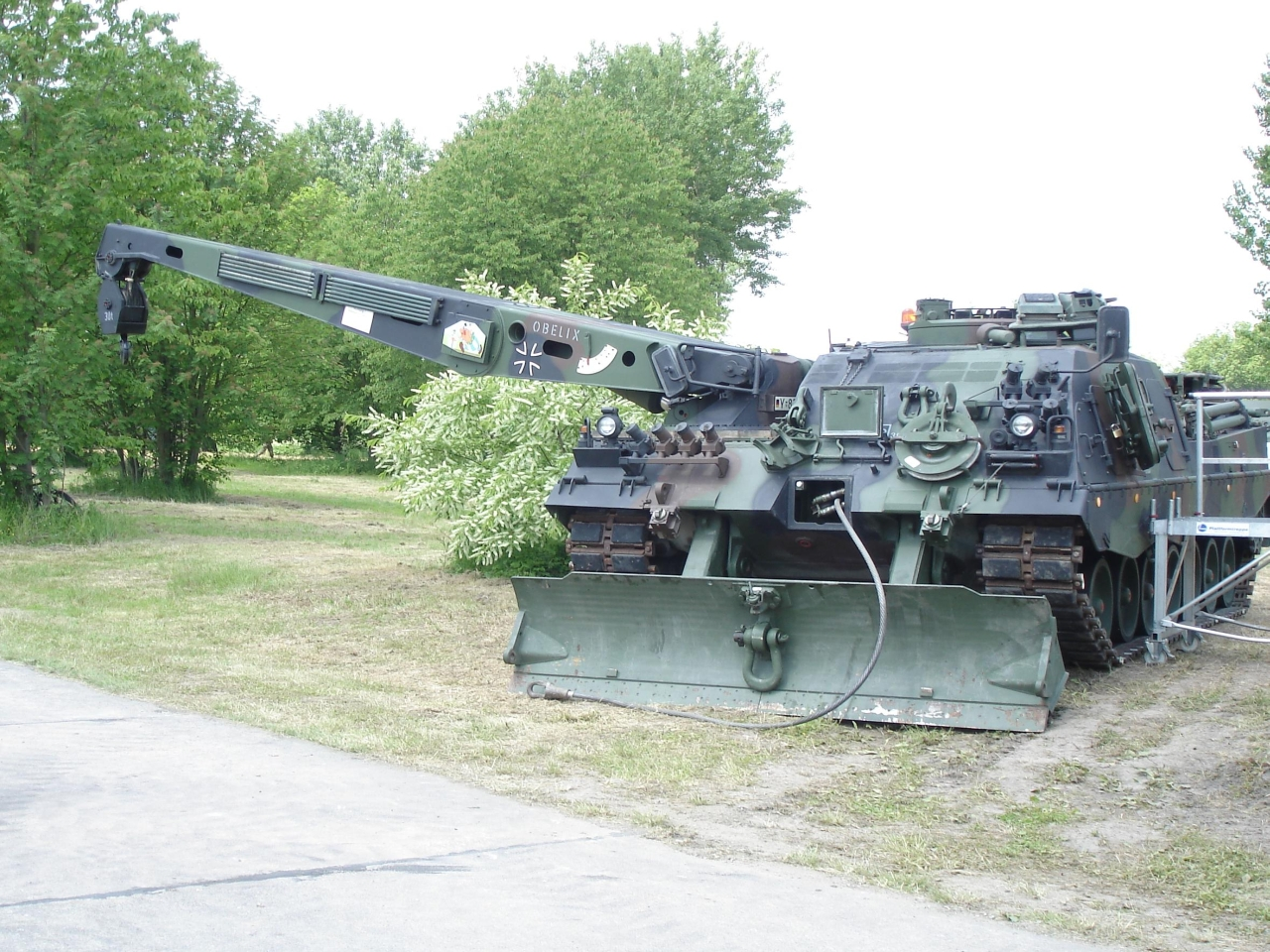
A German Army BPz3 Büffel (2006)

World War II

- Bergepanzer III – PzKpfw III chassis
- Bergepanzer IV – PzKpfw IV chassis
- Bergepanther (Sd.Kfz. 179) – PzKpfw V Panther chassis 347 produced (1943 to 1945).
- Bergetiger – PzKpfw VI Tiger I chassis
- Bergepanzer 38(t) – Jagdpanzer 38 chassis, 170 produced (1944 to 1945).
- Bergepanzer T-34(r) – Captured T-34 chassis

Modern

- Bergepanzer M74 (Sherman chassis) – first TRV/ARV of the West German Bundeswehr, 300 used 1956-1960 (see M74 entry under United States).
- Bergepanzer 1 – M88 chassis, the first of 125 entered service in 1962 and a 1985 modernization program replaced the gasoline engine with a diesel and improved the hoist.
- Bergepanzer 2 – Leopard 1 tank chassis. Used by the Canadian Forces since the 1990s as Taurus ARV.
- Bergepanzer 3 "Büffel" – Leopard 2 chassis
- Bergepanzer Wisent – Bergepanzer 2 chassis. Modified and upgraded by Flensburger Fahrzeugbau to support the demands of the future battlefield. Optimised to support the Leopard 1 and 2 main battle tanks.
- Bergepanzer Wisent 2 – Leopard 2 chassis. Successor of the Wisent. Build by Flensburger Fahrzeugbau.

=== Israel ===
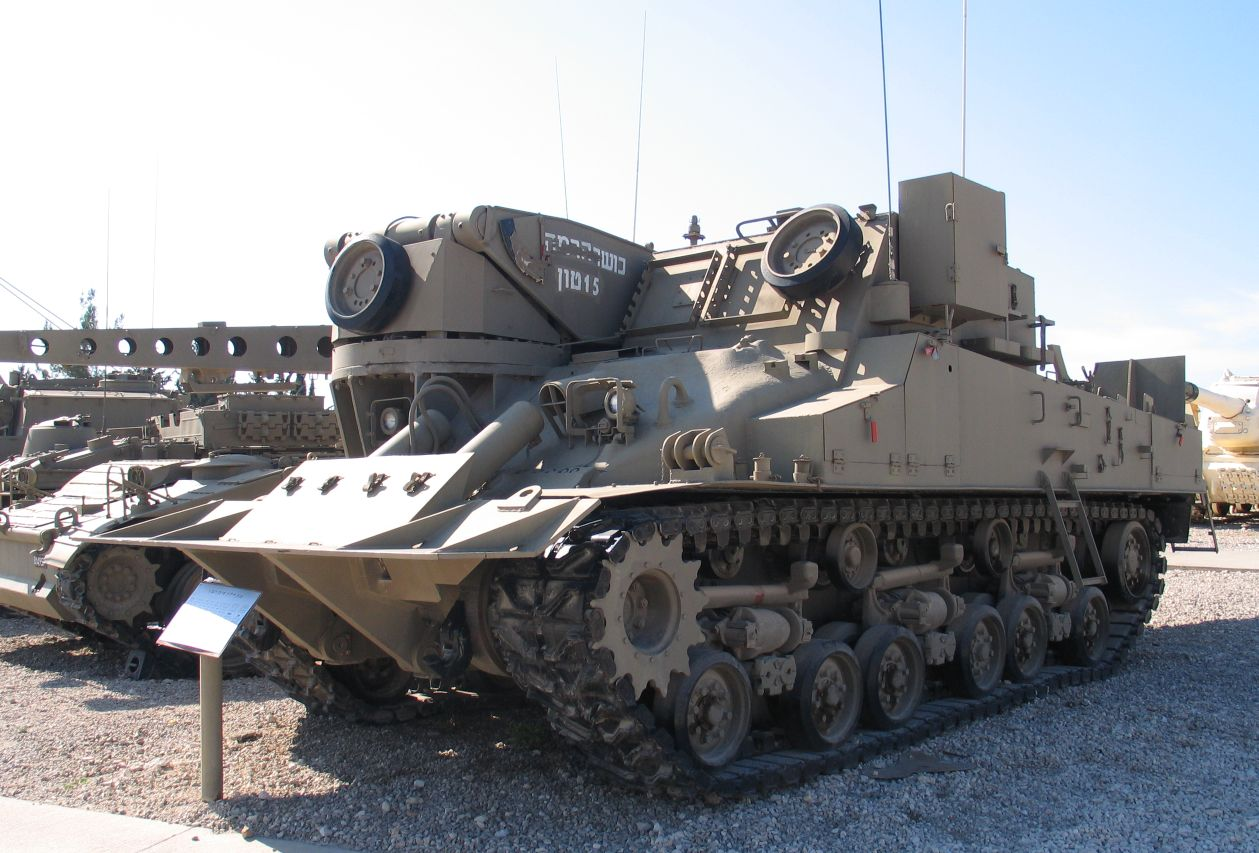
A Trail Blazer, Yad La-Shiryon Museum, Israel

- Trail Blazer (Gordon) (Sherman chassis) – An IDF recovery/engineering vehicle based on HVSS equipped M4A1s Sherman tanks, it featured a large single boom crane (as opposed to the A-Frame of the M32) and large spades at the front and rear of the vehicle to assist in lifting. It could also tow up to 72 tons.
- "Technical" and "Fitter" – ARVs based on the M-113 with crane attached
- Nemera – modern recovery vehicle based on Merkava tank chassis. Several prototypes have been built, but it never fielded in large number in the IDF.
- The current ARV in IDF use is the American-made M88 Recovery Vehicle, which is accompanied and assisted by an IDF Caterpillar D9 armoured bulldozer.

=== Malaysia ===
- WZT-4 build by Polish Bumar-Łabędy

=== Mexico ===
- M32 Chenca (Sherman chassis) – In 1998, Napco International of the USA upgraded M32B1 TRV M4 Sherman-chassis armoured recovery vehicles with Detroit Diesel 8V-92-T diesel engines (see M32 entry under United States).

=== Poland ===
- CW-34 (T-34 chassis)
- WPT-34 (T-34, SU-85 and SU-100 chassis)
- WZT-1 (T-54 and T-55 chassis)
- WZT-2 (T-55 chassis)
- WZT-3 (T-72M chassis)
- WZT-4 (PT-91M chassis) produced for Malaysia
- WPT-TOPAS (TOPAS chassis)
- WPT-MORS (MTLB chassis)
- KWZT "MAMMOTH" Heavy Wheeled Evacuation and Technical Rescue Vehicle (TATRA T 815 – 7Z0R9T 44 440 8x8.1R chassis)

=== Yugoslavia/ Serbia ===
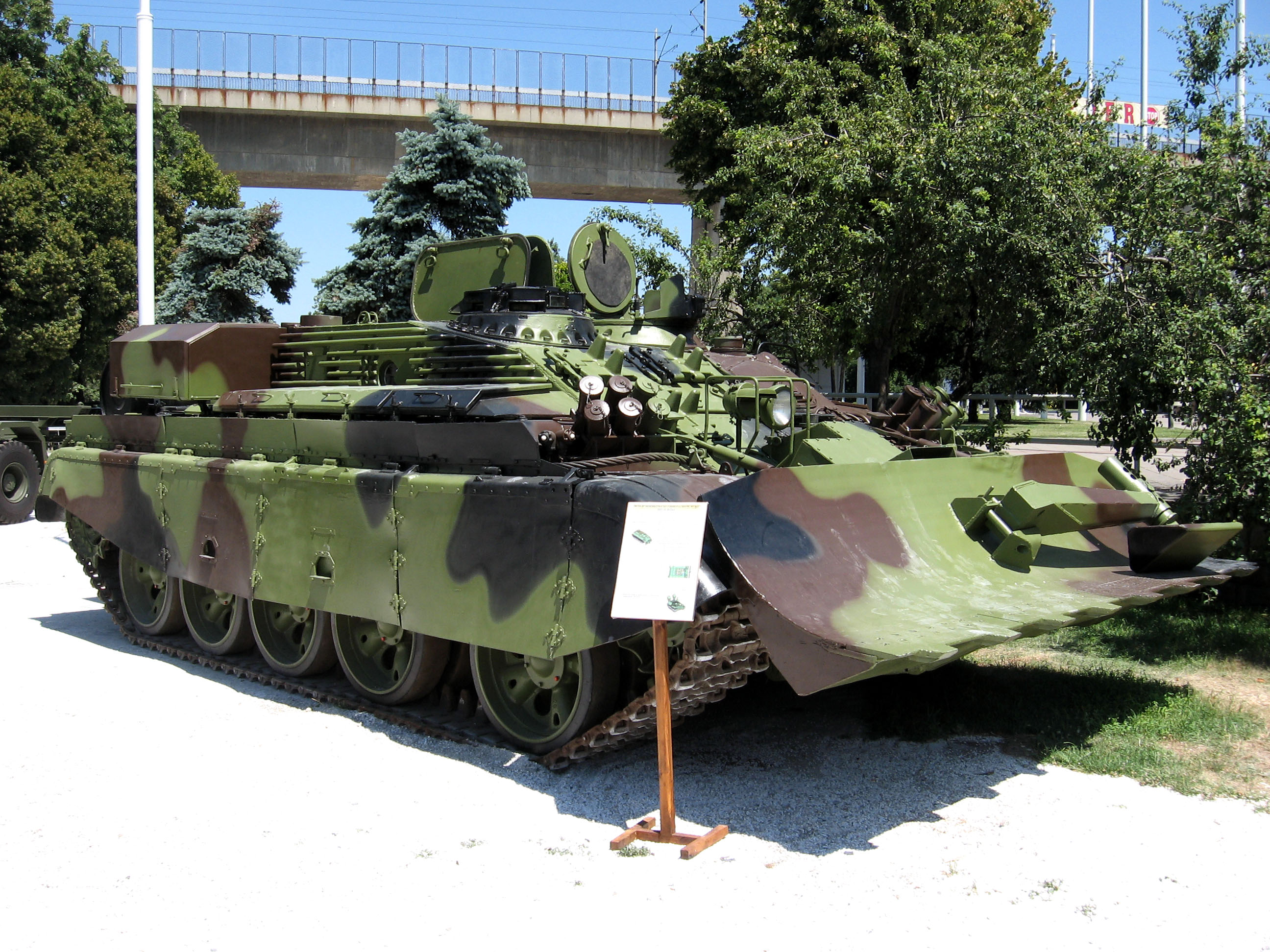
A Serbian VIU-55 Munja (2007)

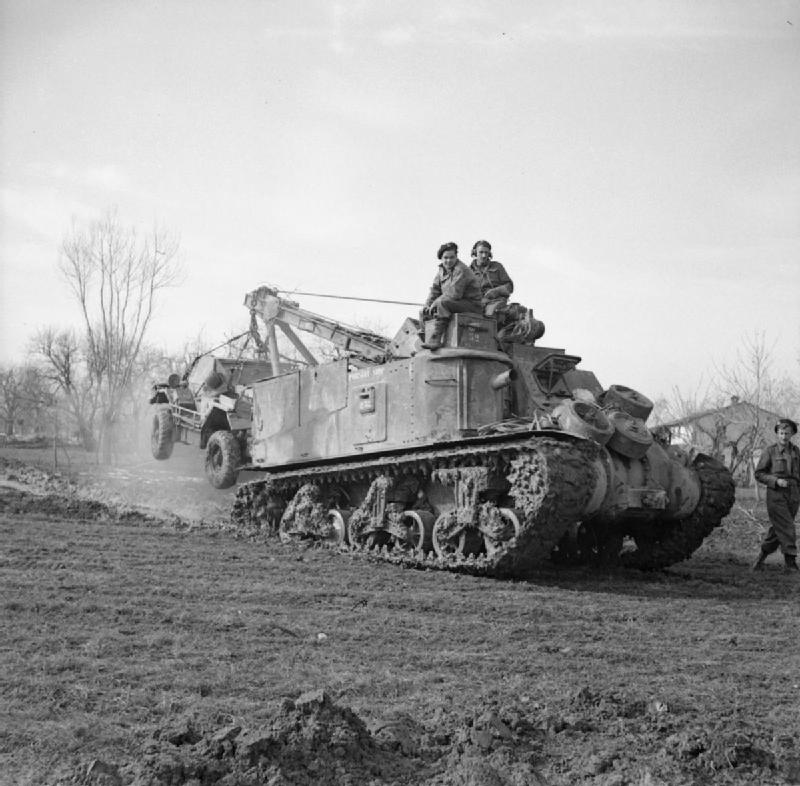
A Grant-based ARV recovers a Daimler Dingo armoured car. Italy, February 1945

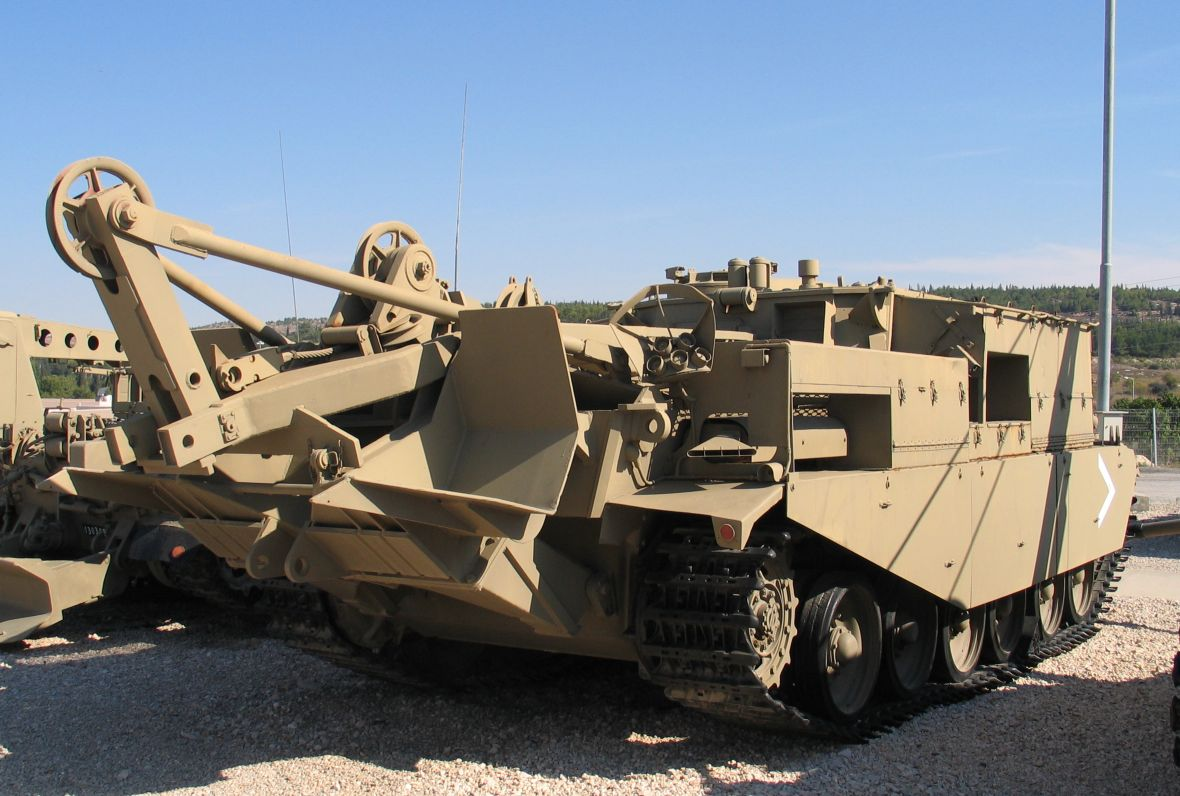
Centurion MkII ARV, Yad La-Shiryon Museum, Israel

- M-84ABI – The ARV based on Yugoslav/Serbian M-84 MBT.
- VIU-55 Munja

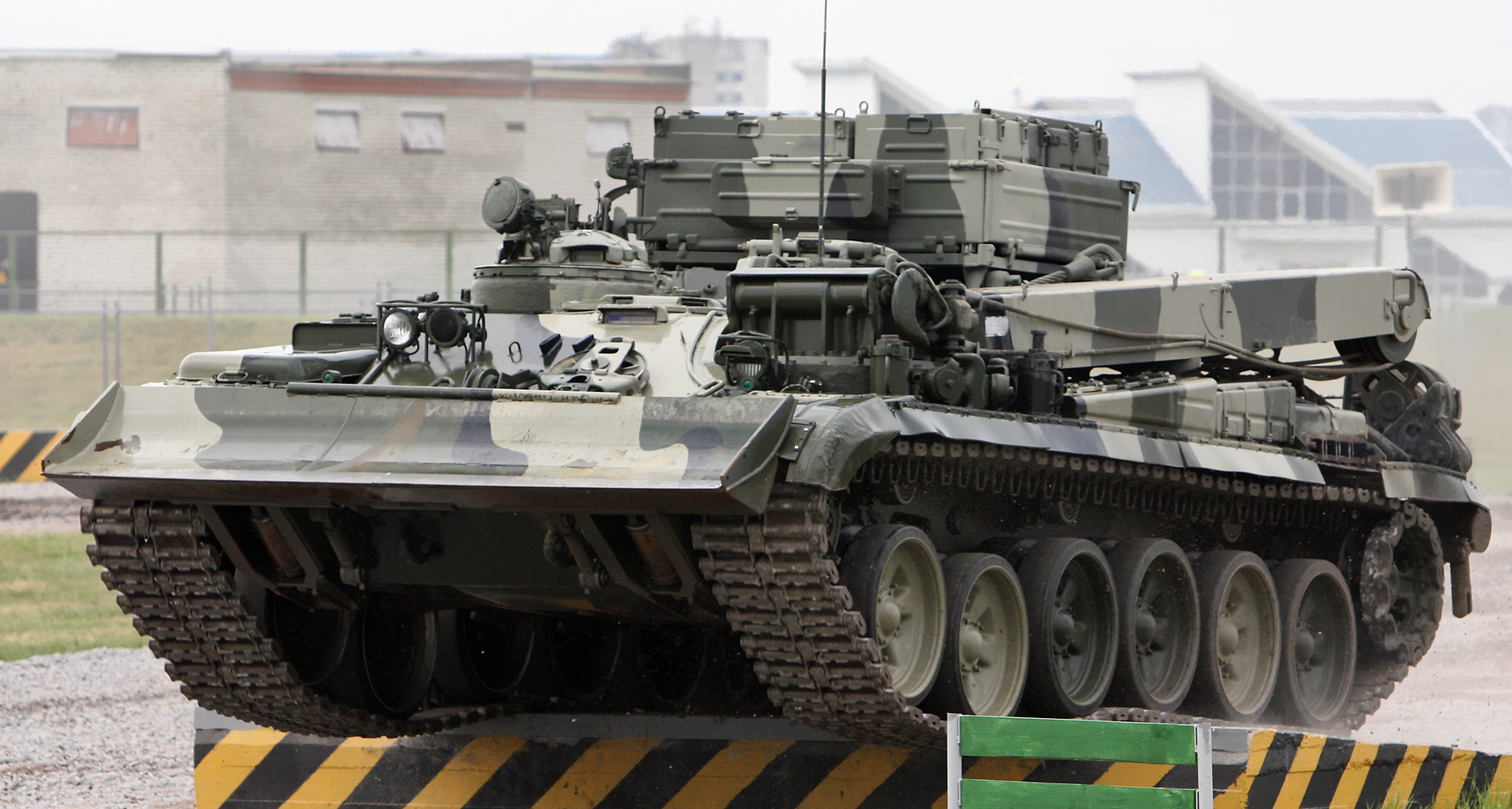
A Russian T-72 based BREM-1 (2010)

=== Soviet Union/Russia ===
The Russian acronym BREM (cyr. БРЭМ) stands for "бронированная ремонтно-эвакуационная машина", literally "armoured repair and recovery vehicle".

- BTS-2 (T-54 chassis)
- BTS-4A (T-44 chassis)
- BREM-1 (T-72 chassis)
- BREM-2 (BMP-1 chassis)
- BREM-D (airborne ARV on a BTR-D chassis)
- BREM-L (BMP-3 chassis)
- BREM-K (BTR-80 chassis)
- BREM-80U (T-80U chassis)
- BREM-1M (T-90 chassis)
- T-16 (Armata chassis)

=== Turkey ===
- M48A5T5 Tamay – Turkish-designed remote controlled armored recovery vehicle built on the M48 chassis.
- MPG M4K – indigenous ARV in 8x8 configuration, with 600 HP engine, an automatic transmission with torque converter also has CBRN capabilities.

=== United Kingdom ===
The British tested their first ARV designs in early 1942. The decision at the time was to focus on the Churchill infantry tank as the basis, but cruiser tank based ARVs were also produced. When the UK received supplies of US medium tanks – first the M3, then M4 Sherman, conversions were made of these to operate alongside and so simplify support.

World War II

- Cavalier ARV
- Churchill ARV
- Crusader ARV
- Centaur Arv
- Cromwell ARV
- Grant ARV – two Marks, the first was a British conversion, the second was a US M31 TRV in British service
- Sherman III ARV I – Armoured recovery vehicle conversion of Sherman III (M4A2), similarly "Sherman V ARV Mark I" and "ARV Mark II"
- Sherman ARV II – conversion of Sherman V with dummy gun in fixed "turret", 7.5 ton jib at front, spade earth anchor at rear.
- Sherman II ARV Mk III was a M32B1 TRV (see US ARV).

Modern

- Centurion ARV
- FV219 – on A45 "Universal tank" chassis
- FV220 Conqueror ARV
- Chieftain FV4204 ARV/ARRV
- FV434 "Carrier, Maintenance, Full Tracked"
- M578
- Challenger armoured repair and recovery vehicle (CRARRV). The CRARRV has a large set of recovery and heavy repair tools including a man portable ultrathermic cutting system with an underwater cutting capability and a portable welding system.
- FV106 Samson – complement to the Combat Vehicle Reconnaissance (Tracked) series of vehicles
- FV513 Warrior Recovery Vehicle – complement to the Warrior tracked armoured vehicles

BARV (World War II to Modern)

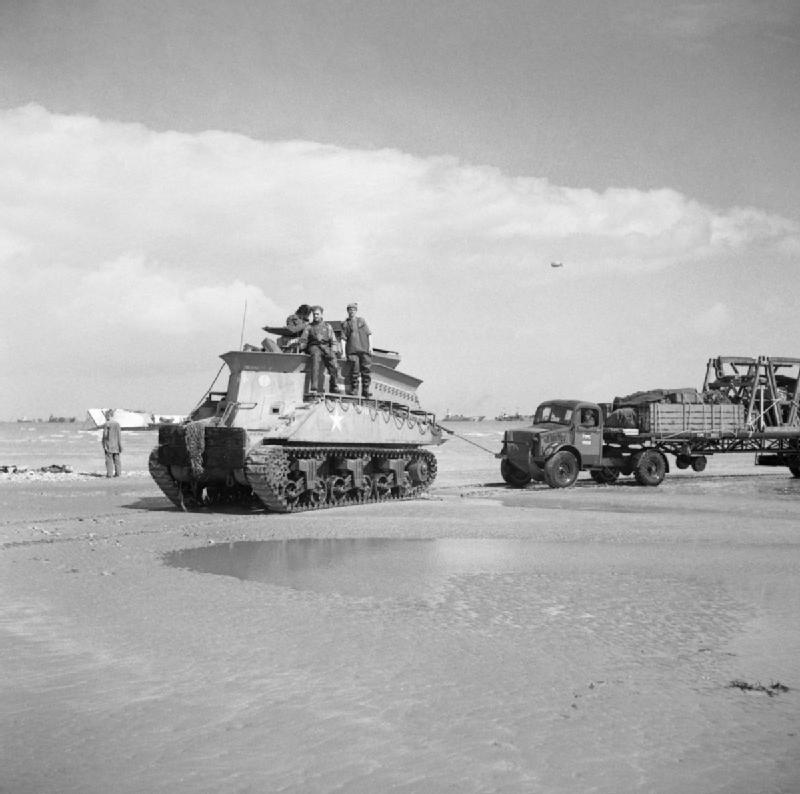
A Sherman tank-based beach armoured recovery vehicle (BARV) tows two disabled vehicles on a beach.

- The BARV is a British military support vehicle, the name coming from "beach armoured recovery vehicle", for working in shallow water. BARVs were used to free operational vehicles that were stuck, and to clear the beach of inoperable vehicles or landing craft, to make way for other forces. Various models were based on the M4A2 Sherman, Centurion and Leopard 1A5 ("Hippo") tank chassis. Australia converted a M3A5 Grant to a BARV configuration. The first BARV was a Sherman M4A2 tank which had been waterproofed and had the turret replaced by a tall armoured superstructure. Around 60 were deployed on the invasion beaches during the Battle of Normandy. The crew included a diver whose job was to go underwater to attach towing chains to stuck vehicles.
- Centurion tank.

=== United States ===
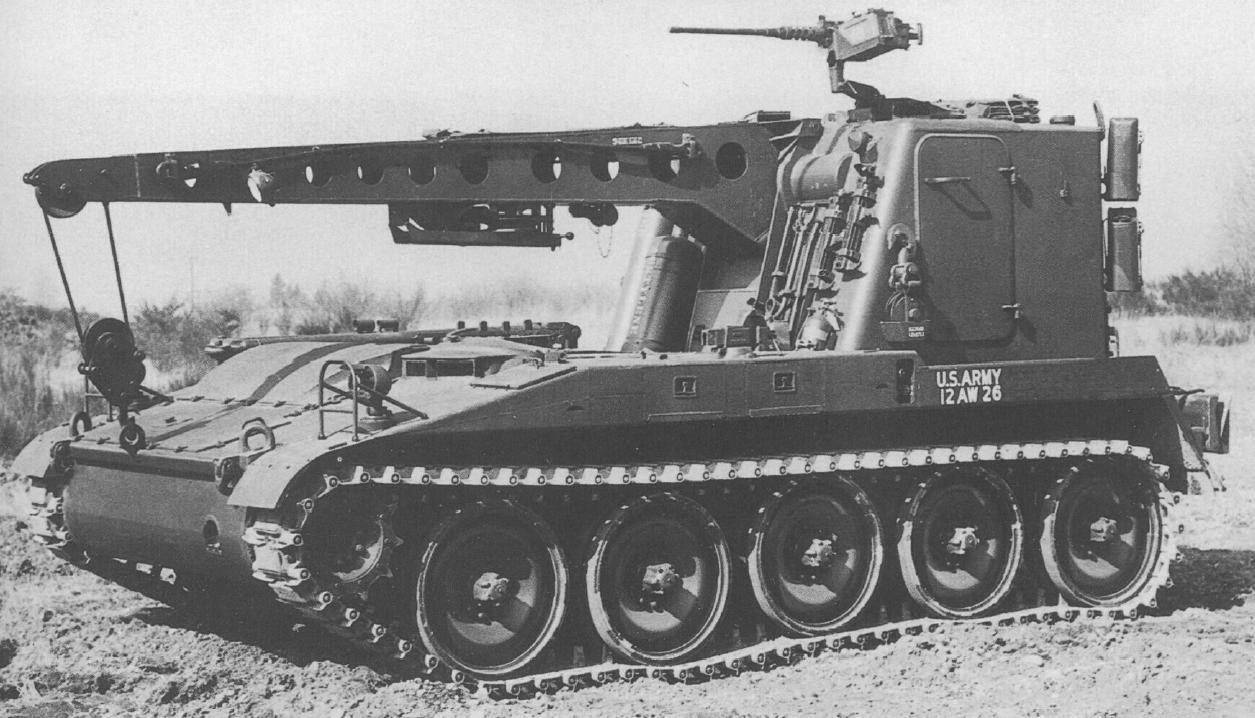
M578 light recovery vehicle, with heavy machine gun mounted on top for self-defense

- M25 tank transporter- Tractor unit could serve a dual purpose as a recovery vehicle.
- M31 tank recovery vehicle – based on M3 Lee chassis. (sometimes called a T2 tank retriever)
- M32 tank recovery vehicle, or M32 TRV, based on the Sherman tank chassis with turret replaced by fixed superstructure, 60,000 lb (27,000 kg) winch and an 18 feet (5.5 m) long pivoting A-frame jib installed. An 81 mm mortar was also added into the hull, primarily for screening purposes.
  - M32B1 – M32s converted from M4A1s (some converted to M34 artillery prime mover tractors).
    - M32A1B1 – M32B1s with HVSS, later removing the 81 mm mortar and incorporating crane improvements.
  - M32B2 – M32s converted from M4A2s.
  - M32B3 – M32s converted from M4A3s.
    - M32A1B3 – M32B3s brought up to M32A1B1 standard.
  - M32B4 – M32s converted from M4A4s.
- M74 armored recovery vehicle – Upgrade of the M32 to provide the same capability for heavier post-war tanks, converted from M4A3 HVSS tanks. In appearance, the M74 is very similar to the M32, fitted with an A-Frame crane, a main towing winch, an auxiliary winch, and a manual utility winch. The M74 also has a front-mounted spade that can be used as a support or as a dozer blade.
  - M74B1 – Same as the M74, but converted from M32B3s.
- M578 light recovery vehicle (LRV) – based on the M110 chassis.
- M51 heavy recovery vehicle – based on the M103 heavy tank chassis.
- M88 recovery vehicle – based on the chassis and parts of the automotive component of the M48 Patton & M60 Patton.
  - M88A1 recovery vehicle – improved, medium, 55-ton, diesel engine.
  - M88A2 Hercules recovery vehicle – improved, heavy, 70-ton, diesel engine.
  - M88A3 Hercules recovery vehicle – a further upgrade of the M88A2 . It is the latest member of the M88 family. It uses a modernized powertrain and has improved speed, hoisting and winching capacity also features a seventh road wheel to reduce ground pressure.

== See also ==
- Armoured warfare
- Army engineering maintenance
- List of AFVs
- Tank transporter
