= VIU-55 Munja =

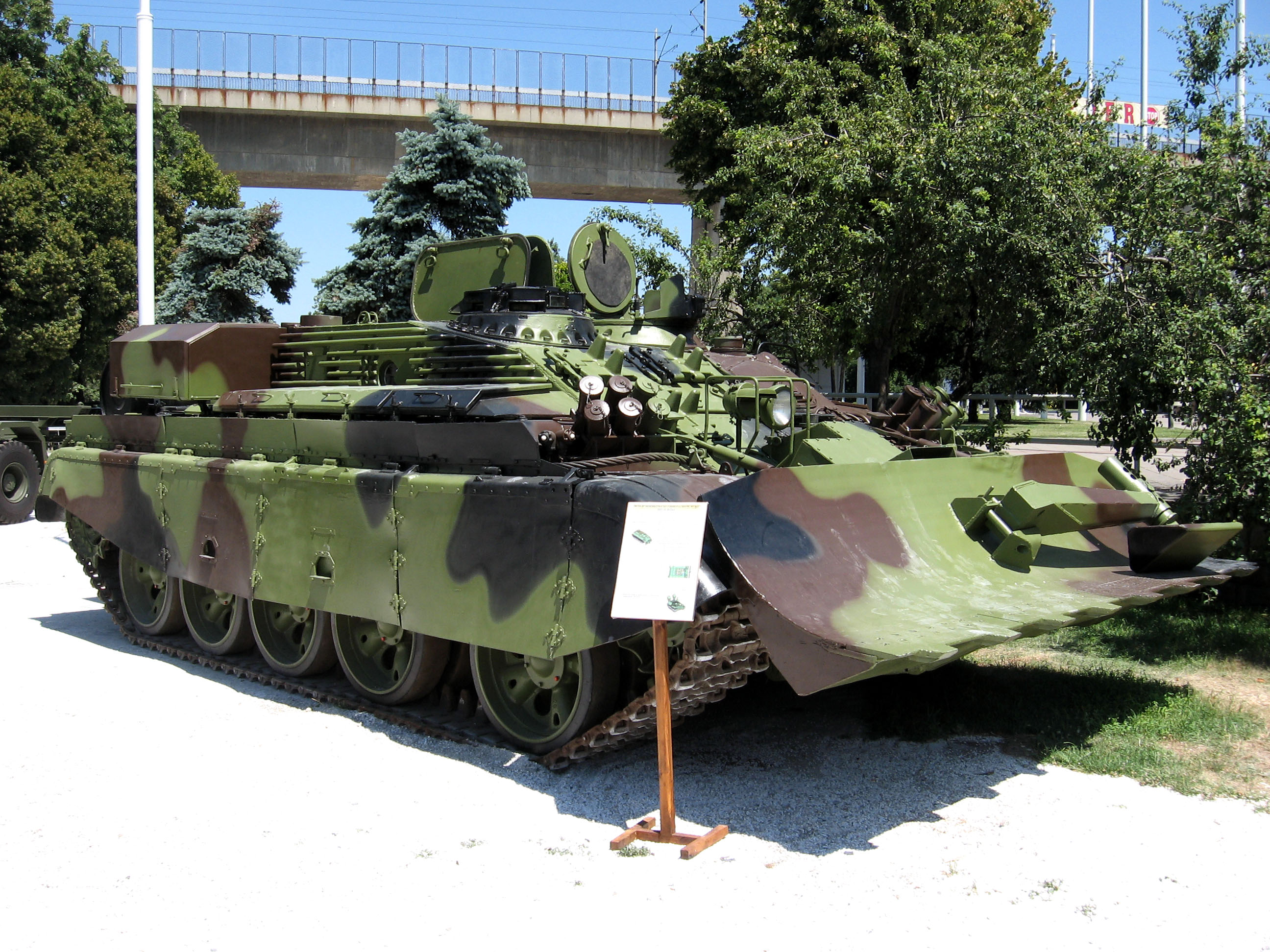
- Type: Combat engineering vehicle Armored personnel carrier
- Place of origin: Serbia & Russia

Production history
- Designer: Military Technical Institute

Specifications
- Mass: 32 tonnes & 38.3 tonnes
- Length: 6.20 m
- Width: 3.27 m
- Height: 2.05 m
- Crew: 2 + 6 passengers
- Armor: T-55 Hull
- Main armament: 3×7.62mm Zastava M84 machine gun, 30mm M-93 grenade launcher
- Engine: diesel 780 hp
- Suspension: torsion bar
- Operational range: 545 km
- Maximum speed: 50 km/h

VIU-55 Munja (from Serbian: муња, lit. 'lightning') is a combat engineering vehicle produced by Serbia. VTI did the conceptual design of the Munja general-purpose engineer vehicle and the Technical Overhauling Institute "Čačak" built the vehicle. The main idea was converting the T-55 tank, using its main structure and subsystems and adding new components, equipment and devices to create a vehicle for entirely different purposes. Good terrain negotiating ability and ballistic protection of T-55 tank were retained, while engineer equipment and armament were refitted. Starting in 2004, about 210 of these vehicles were produced. It was the first armoured vehicle for the Serbian engineer corps, outfitted with special purpose engineer equipment and a respectable armament belonging to the most modern designs of this kind.

== Overview ==
It is designed to negotiate natural and man-made obstacles, blocking, fortifying and repair of roads and for safe transport of engineer teams and equipment in combat conditions. VTI designers have thoughtfully arranged accommodation for 8 members of the crew (2 permanent members – driver and deputy commander, also gunner of the 30 mm automatic grenade launcher and 7.62 mm machine gun, and a 6-member troop – commander and section of five pioneers). Space is also provided for sets of engineer equipment, for mounting of commander's and gunner's cupola and associated equipment.

Space needed to accommodate personnel and sets of special equipment was obtained by removing tank turret, cutting away section of hull roof plate and by refitting of superstructure consisting of armour plates and sheet metal that provides adequate ballistic protection of on-board crew and equipment. Armour plates are up to 25 mm thick and mounted so as to provide ballistic protection from 12.7 mm (.5in) bullets. Horizontal roof plate of superstructure is made of several sections to provide necessary hatches. Openings are provided for fitting of commander's and gunner's cupolas, two access and evacuation hatches for engineer section, holes for radio set antenna, rotating periscope, driver's cover, refueling port and two lookout ports (for observation and for firing personal weapons). To perform engineering tasks, a tankgrade blade it fitted at the front, equipped with electric motor, pump and hydraulics. Blade assembly is an autonomous unit that can be quickly and easily attached to the hull.

== Armament ==
Vehicle firepower consists of one 30 mm automatic grenade launcher and one machine gun (M84, .3in/7.62 mm calibre). Vehicle concept permits fitting of weapons group station consisting of a 30 mm gun, 7.62 mm machine gun, antitank wire guided rockets and 30 mm automatic grenade launcher with appropriate optoelectronic fire control system.

== Protection ==
For masking protection, Munja was designed for protection in all ranges of electromagnetic spectrum (visual, close IR, radar and thermal parts of the spectrum). For masking and jamming of guided projectiles, the vehicle is equipped with smoke canisters' launcher and control panel identical to those mounted on M-84 tanks. Smoke charge launchers are mounted in front section of tracks covering plates. To protect the crew from nuclear and chemical agents a modified nuclear-chemical protection unit is built-in, consisting of anti radiation fan. This is automatically activated in case of nuclear shock wave. Protection from shaped charges consists of very effective skirts. To prevent fuel explosions and resulting fires in the event of penetration of ballistic protection, a fuel explosion and fire prevention system has been fitted. It is autonomous, provided with UV and IR sensors with detection and activation time measured as thousands of a second.

== Mobility ==
Mobility of Munja engineer vehicle is at the level of T-55 tank but it could be further improved by retrofit of higher power engine and modern transmission, in particular of the MPG-780 modular power pack featuring the engine developing 580 kW (780 HP). Power pack is replaceable in field conditions.

== Operational capabilities ==
General purpose engineer vehicle Munja can be well used in peacekeeping and humanitarian missions. The existing model represents the base for development of a family of tracked armoured combat vehicles; in particular of armoured personnel carrier possessing considerably higher level of all-round ballistic protection compared to current conventional APC-s and IFV-s. Munja integrates all equipment needed for specific engineering combat missions (crossing of artificial obstacles, making of barriers, road making and fortifying). Owing to modern positioning system, Munja can be tracked on virtual map while newly developed software enables the use of advanced computer technologies in the execution of engineering works. In parallel with development of Munja, engineer units were supplied with combat sets of specialist pioneer equipment.

== See also ==
- BTR-T
- BMP-55
- IDF Achzarit
- Tarmour
- Type 59 HIFV
