= List of tank guns =

This is a list of tank main guns which are designed or used as the primary weapon of combat by tanks, such as light tanks, medium tanks, heavy tanks, or main battle tanks. Many tanks have other, secondary weapons installed in them, such as machine guns, autocannons and small calibre mortars, which are not included in this list.

Also excluded from this list are weapons installed in self-propelled artillery vehicles such as assault guns or tank destroyers that usually lack turrets. This is due to the unique nature of turreted tank tactics, their design, and operation.

== List of tank guns ==
Caliber (mm)	Weapon name	Country of origin	Period
20	TNSh	Soviet Union	World War II
20	2 cm KwK 30	Germany	1930s
20	Breda 35	Italy	World War II
25	25 SA 35	France	World War II
37	3.7 cm ÚV vzor 34 (Škoda A3)	Czechoslovakia	1930's
37	3.7 cm ÚV vzor 38 (Škoda A7)	Czechoslovakia	1930's
37	PS-1	Soviet Union	1930s
37	PS-2 Model 1930	Soviet Union	1930s
37	B-3 Model 1930	Soviet Union	1930s
37	Bofors 37 mm	Sweden	1930s
37	37 SA 18	France	World War I / World War II
37	37 SA 38	France	World War II
37	37 mm Gun M3	United States	World War II
37	37mm Gun M5/M6	United States	World War II
37	37 mm Vickers-Terni L/40	Italy	1930's
37	3.7 cm KwK 36 L/45	Germany	World War II
40	Ordnance QF 2-pounder	United Kingdom	World War II
45	M1932 (19-K)/Model 32/35/38	Soviet Union	1930s / World War II
47	Ordnance QF 3-pounder	United Kingdom	1920s-1930s
47	4.7 cm KPÚV vz.38	Germany	World War II
47	47 SA 34	France	pre-World War II
47	47mm SA 35 mle 1935	France	World War II
47	Type 1 47 mm	Japan	World War II
47	Cannone da 47/32 & 47/40	Italy	World War II
50	5 cm KwK 38	Germany	World War II
50	5 cm KwK 39	Germany	World War II
57	QF 6-pounder Hotchkiss	France	World War I
57	QF 6-pounder 6 cwt Hotchkiss	United Kingdom	World War I
57	Ordnance QF 6-pounder	United Kingdom	World War II
57	Bofors 57 mm anti-tank gun	Sweden	World War II
57	Cockerill-Nordenfelt "Canon de caponnière" / 5.7 cm Maxim-Nordenfelt	Belgium	World War I
57	Type 97 57 mm	Japan	World War II
57	ZiS-4	Soviet Union	World War II
73	2A28 Grom	Soviet Union	Cold War
75	Kan Strv m/41	Sweden	World War II
75	Kan Strv 74	Sweden	Cold War
75	Canon de 75 mm modèle 1897	France	World War I
75	75 SA 35	France	World War II
75	75 SA 50	France	Cold War
75	7.5 cm KwK 37	Germany	World War II
75	Ordnance QF 75 mm	United Kingdom	World War II
75	Type 3 75 mm	Japan	World War II
75	Type 5 75 mm	Japan	World War II
75	7.5 cm KwK 40	Germany	World War II
75	7.5 cm KwK 42	Germany	World War II
75	75mm Gun M2/M3/M6	United States	World War II
76.2	Ordnance QF 3-inch howitzer	United Kingdom	World War II
76.2	Ordnance QF 17-pounder	United Kingdom	World War II
76.2	77 mm HV	United Kingdom	World War II
76.2	Model 27/32 howitzer	Soviet Union	1930s
76.2	L-10	Soviet Union	1930s
76.2	76.2 mm L-11	Soviet Union	World War II
76.2	F-32	Soviet Union	World War II
76.2	76 mm M1940 F-34/M1941 ZiS-5	Soviet Union	World War II
76.2	D-56T	Soviet Union	Cold War
76.2	76 mm gun M1	United States	World War II
76.2	3-inch Gun M7	United States	World War II
84	Ordnance QF 20-pounder	United Kingdom	Cold War
85	D-5T	Soviet Union	World War II
85	ZiS-S-53	Soviet Union	World War II
88	KwK 36	Germany	World War II
88	KwK 43 L71	Germany	World War II
90	90mm Gun M3	United States	World War II
90	GIAT CN90F1 (DEFA D921)	France	Cold War
90	KV90S73	Sweden	Cold War
94	Ordnance QF 95 mm howitzer	United Kingdom	World War II
94	Ordnance QF 32-pounder	United Kingdom	World War II
95	95mm F39	Soviet Union	1930s
100	D-10T	Soviet Union	World War II / Cold War
100	100 SA 47 L/58	France	Cold War
105	10.5 cm kwk 18	Germany	World War II
105	105mm Howitzer M4	United States	World War II
105	AMX CN-105 F1	France	Modern
105	Royal Ordnance L7	United Kingdom	Cold War
105	Bofors L74	Sweden	Cold War
105	Rheinmetall LTA2	West Germany	Cold War
107	ZIS-6	Soviet Union	World War II
115	U-5TS/2A20	Soviet Union	Cold War
120	120 mm M58 cannon/T123E3 Cannon	United States	Cold War
120	Rheinmetall Rh-120 L44/M256	West Germany	Cold War / Modern
120	Rheinmetall Rh-120 L55	Germany	Modern
120	MG251/MG253	Israel	Cold War
120	Royal Ordnance L11	United Kingdom	Cold War / Modern
120	Royal Ordnance L30	United Kingdom	Modern
120	GIAT CN120-26/52	France	Cold War/Modern
120	KBM2	Ukraine	Modern
120	Japan Steel Works (JSW) Type 10 gun	Japan	Modern
120	CN08 120 mm gun	South Korea	Modern
122	D-25T	Soviet Union	World War II
122	122mm Howitzer M1938 M-30	Soviet Union	1930s
125	D-81T/Sprut anti-tank gun	Soviet Union	Cold War / Modern
125	KBA3	Ukraine	Modern
128	12.8 cm Pak 44	Germany	World War II
130	Rheinmetall Rh-130 L/52	Germany	Modern
130	M-65 L/60	Soviet Union	Cold War
140	ASCALON (tank gun)	France	Modern
149	15 cm sIG 33	Germany	World War II
152	152 mm M-10T	Soviet Union	World War II
152	152 mm M81 Gun/Launcher	United States	Vietnam / Cold War
152	M-69	Soviet Union	Cold War
155	155 mm gun T7	United States	World War II / Cold War
165	165mm L9 Demolition Gun	United Kingdom	Cold War
183	183mm Gun L4	United Kingdom	Cold War

== See also ==
- Tank gun
