= Kampfwagenkanone =

Designation for German tank guns in WWII

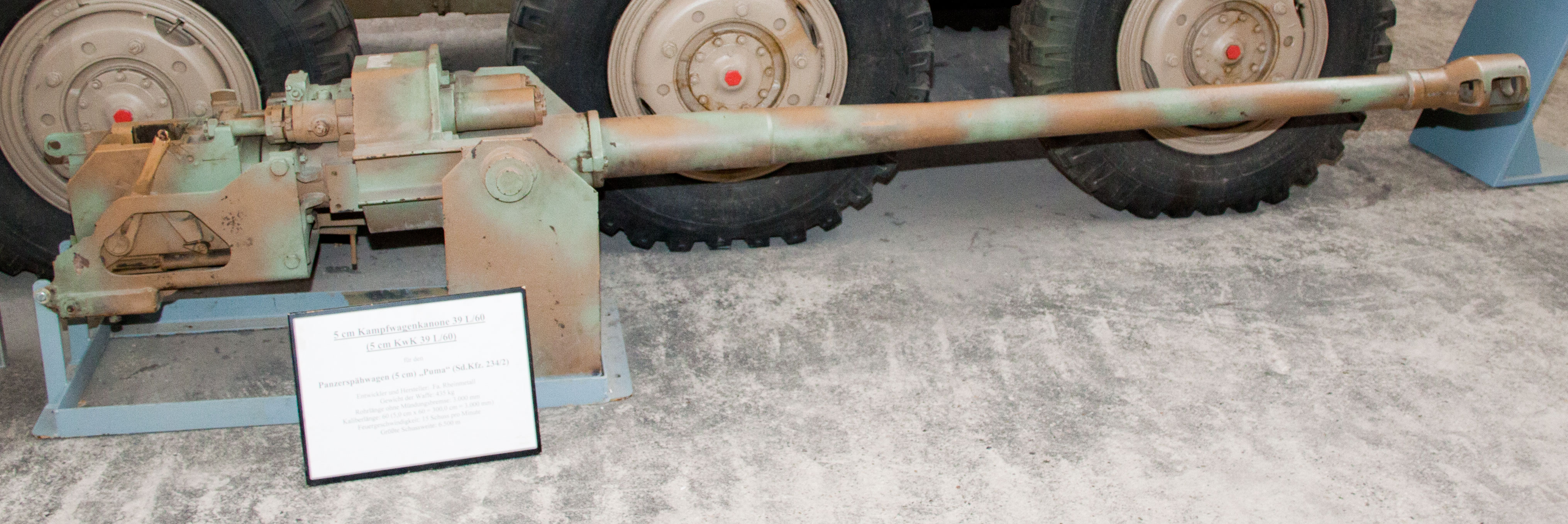
Historical 5 cm KwK 39 in front to the Panzerspähwagen Sd.Kfz. 234

Kampfwagenkanone (KwK) (lit. 'fighting vehicle cannon' in German) was the designation given to any type of tank gun mounted in an armoured fighting vehicle or infantry fighting vehicle of the German Wehrmacht until 1945. The wording was derived from the German nouns Kampfwagen (fighting vehicle) and Kanone (cannon or gun). However, the present-day designation in German speaking armed forces to this particular weapon system is Panzerkanone ('tank gun').

Kampfwagenkanonen, developed in Germany, were normally derived from the construction concept of anti tank guns (Panzerabwehrkanone). Modifications were used in the anti-aircraft artillery (Flakartillerie) as well.

== Examples ==
The following table contains examples of Kampfwagenkanonen, operated by the Wehrmacht in World War II.

Designation (codename)	Caliber (length)	Barrel length (in cm)	Operational platforms			
Designation (codename)	Caliber (length)	Barrel length (in cm)	Sonderkraftfahrzeug (Sd.Kfz.)	as Pak	as Flak	Others
2 cm KwK 30	L/55	110.0	Panzerkampfwagen II; Bergepanther; Leichter Panzerspähwagen; Panzerspähwagen Sd.Kfz. 231		2 cm Flak 30	2 cm Flak C/30; Kriegsmarine
2 cm KwK 38	L/55	110.0	PzKpfw II Ausf. J-L		2 cm Flakvierling 38; 2 cm Gebirgsflak 38	
3.7 cm KwK 36	L/45	166.5	PzKpfw III Ausf. A-F	3.7 cm Pak 36		
5 cm KwK 38	L/42	210.0	PzKpfw III Ausf. F-H			
5 cm KwK 39	L/60	300.0	PzKpfw III Ausf. J-M	5 cm Pak 38		BK 5 cannon
7.5 cm KwK 37	L/24	180.0	PzKpfw III Ausf. N; PzKpfw IV, Ausf. A-F			
7.5 cm KwK 40	L/43	322.5	PzKpfw IV Ausf. F2/G			7.5 cm StuK 40 L/43
7.5 cm KwK 40	L/48	360.0	PzKpfw IV, Ausf. G-J; Jagdpanzer IV	7.5 cm Pak 39 L/48		7.5 cm StuK 40 L/48
7.5 cm KwK 42	L/70	525.0	Panzer IV/70; Panther; Panther II	7.5 cm Pak 42 (on Jagdpanzer)		7.5 cm Pak 42
8.8 cm KwK 36	L/56	492.8	Tiger I		8.8 cm Flak 18/36/37	
8.8 cm KwK 43	L/71	624.8	Jagdpanther; Tiger II	8.8 cm Pak 43		
12.8 cm KwK 44	L/55	704.0	Jagdtiger; Panzer VIII Maus	12.8 cm Pak 44		12.8 Pak 44

== See also ==
- List of Sd.Kfz. designations
