= Rheinmetall BK-5 =

BK-5 cannon
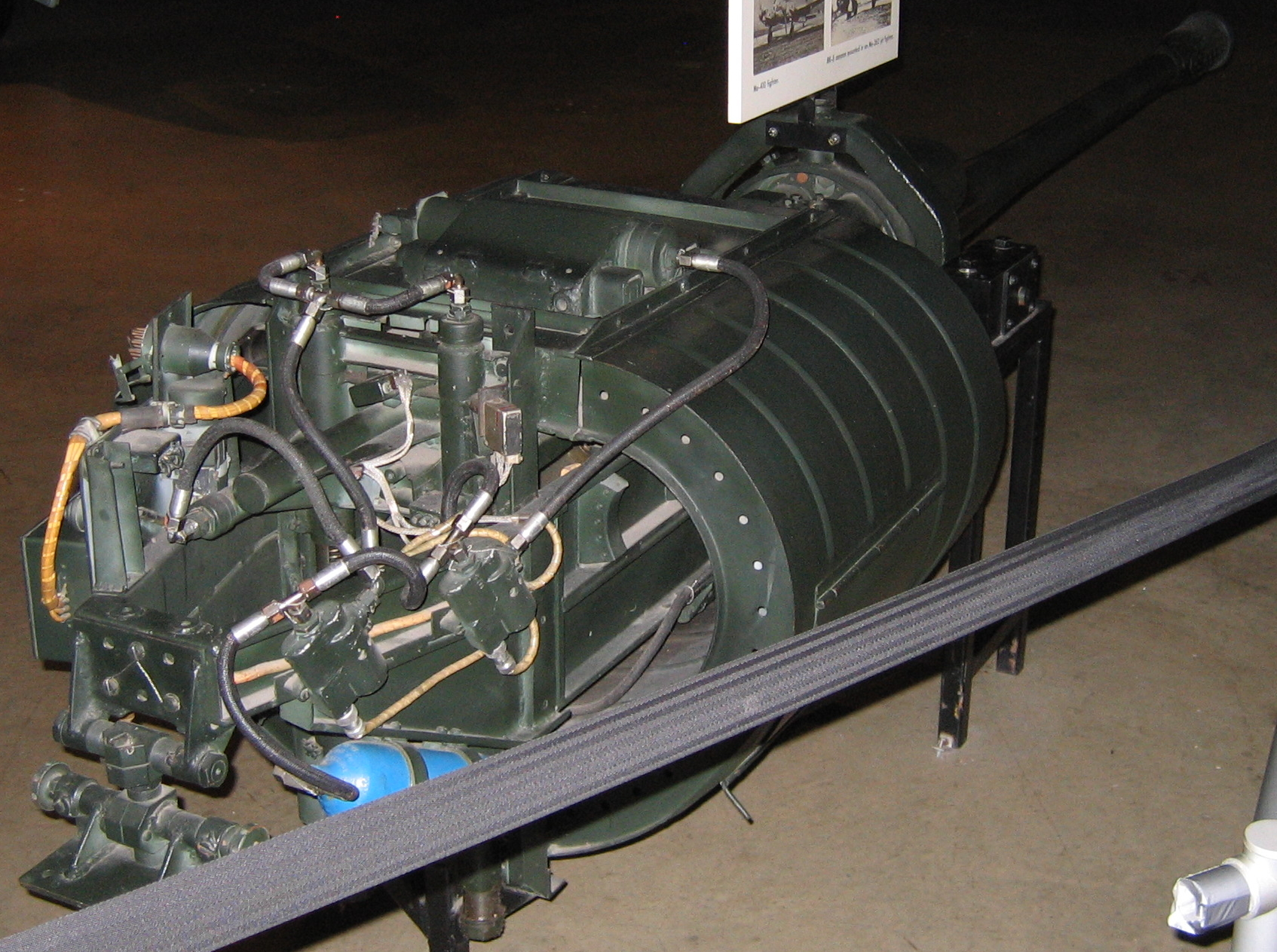
- Rear view of a BK 5 in the National Museum of the United States Air Force, Dayton, Ohio, showing the circular magazine
- Type: Aircraft autocannon
- Place of origin: Germany

Service history
- In service: 1944–1945
- Used by: Nazi Germany
- Wars: World War II

Production history
- Designer: Rheinmetall
- Designed: 1943
- Manufacturer: Rheinmetall
- Produced: 1943–1945
- No. built: approx. 300

Specifications
- Mass: 540 kg (1,190 lb)
- Length: 4.348 m (14.27 ft)
- Barrel length: 3.037 m (9.96 ft) l/60
- Shell: 50×420mm R
- Caliber: 50mm
- Rate of fire: 40-45 rounds/min
- Feed system: 21 rounds

The Rheinmetall Bordkanone 5, or BK-5, was a WWII-era German 50 mm autocannon primarily intended for use against Allied heavy bombers, such as the United States Army Air Forces's (USAAF) Boeing B-17 Flying Fortress. The shells had a high muzzle velocity and significant kinetic energy, allowing them to be fired from distances outside the range of the bombers' defensive guns. The large explosive content of each shell almost ensured the destruction of any bomber that was hit.

Rheinmetall was given a contract in 1943 to adapt the 50 mm 5 cm KwK 39 tank gun, from the Panzer III tank, for aerial use in the twin-engined Messerschmitt Me 410 Hornisse bomber destroyer. They were installed as Umrüst-Bausätze ("factory modification") 4 in the Me 410 A-1/U4, and, experimentally, in two Messerschmitt Me 262 A-1a/U4 jet fighter prototypes (though these were not used operationally), as the MK 214A cannon of similar caliber was not yet available. An experimental fitment of the BK 5 in an undernose Bola (or "dustbin") mount on a small number of Heinkel He 177A-3 heavy bombers was part of a small force of the bombers that was given the task of suppressing Flak on the Eastern Front near Stalingrad early in the winter of 1942–1943 as the A-3/Rüstsatz 5 version, allegedly nicknamed the Stalingradtyp. The semi-circular magazine of the BK-5 weapon system held 21 rounds.

Approximately 300 were produced but saw only limited action, most notably in the Me 410 A-1/U4 aircraft that served with the II. Gruppe of Zerstörergeschwader 26 (ZG 26). It was also mounted on the Junkers Ju 88.

Intended for long-range shots, the cannon was given a telescopic sight in addition to the Me 410's standard Revi C12C gunsight, in order to make it easier to take long-range shots from outside a bomber's defensive perimeter, as a stand-off weapon system. This proved to be more of a hindrance than a help in the turning fights in which the Me 410s often found themselves when engaged by enemy fighters, as the manoeuvring targets easily escaped from the telescopic sight's small field of view, forcing them to use to normal sights instead. Since the BK 5 was almost useless against such small, nimble targets, the use of the telescopic sight was unnecessary in these situations anyway.

As installed in the Me 262, with the muzzle protruding well beyond the nose of the fighter, the cannon was found to be prone to jamming, and if fired at night the muzzle flash tended to temporarily blind the pilot's night vision.

According to the account of the engagements against the USAAF by II./ZG 26 from late February through mid-April 1944, the 53 Me 410 Hornisse of that Zerstörergruppe equipped with the BK 5 claimed a total of 129 Boeing B-17 Flying Fortress and four Consolidated B-24 Liberator heavy bombers, destroyed over five or six interceptions while losing nine of their own Me 410s.

== See also ==
- BK 3,7
- BK 7,5
- MK 112 cannon
- Vickers "S" gun
- QF 6pdr Class M Mark I with Auto Loader Mk III (6pdr Molins gun)
- Nudelman-Suranov NS-45
