= Neubaufahrzeug =

1934 German medium tank

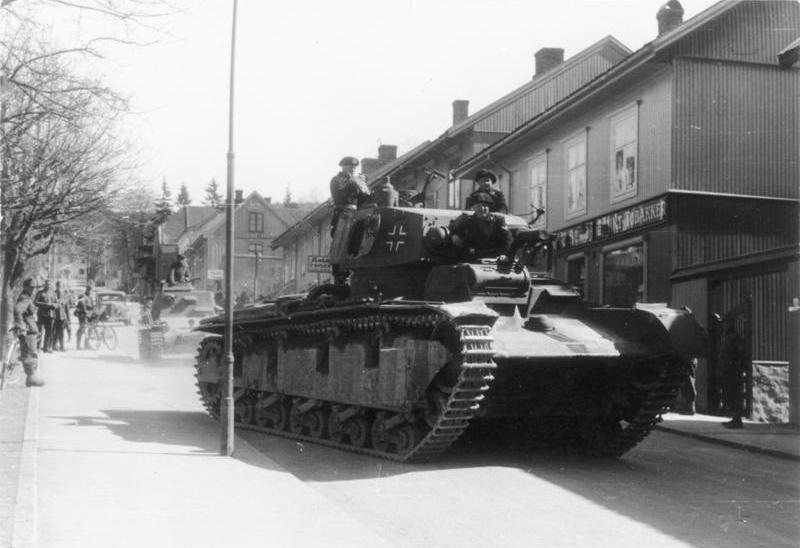
- A Neubaufahrzeug V in Norway in April 1940
- Type: Medium tank
- Place of origin: Nazi Germany

Service history
- In service: 1935–1940
- Used by: Nazi Germany
- Wars: World War II

Production history
- Designer: Rheinmetall; Krupp
- Designed: 1933–1934
- Manufacturer: Rheinmetall
- Produced: 1934–1936
- No. built: 5

Specifications
- Mass: 23.41 tonnes (23.04 long tons; 25.81 short tons)
- Length: 6.65 m (21 ft 10 in)
- Width: 2.90 m (9 ft 6 in)
- Height: 2.90 m (9 ft 6 in)
- Crew: 6
- Armor: 10–20 mm (0.39–0.79 in)
- Main armament: 7.5 cm KwK 37
- Secondary armament: 3.7 cm KwK 36; 3× 7.92 mm MG 34 machine gun
- Engine: 290 hp BMW Va
- Transmission: ZF SSG 280
- Suspension: coil springs
- Fuel capacity: 457 liters
- Operational range: road: 120 km (75 mi)
- Maximum speed: maximum: 30 km/h (19 mph) road: 25 km/h (16 mph)

The German Panzerkampfwagen Neubaufahrzeug ("new construction vehicle"—a cover name), abbreviated as PzKpfw Nb.Fz, series of tank prototypes were a first attempt to create a medium tank for the German Army (Heer) after Adolf Hitler had come to power. Multi-turreted, heavy and slow, they were not considered successful, which led to only five being produced. These were primarily used for propaganda purposes and training, though three took part in the Battle of Norway in 1940. Pictures of the Neubaufahrzeuge were displayed with different turret models and orientations to fool allied spies; American and Soviet agents independently reported that the Germans had two new heavy tanks, the Panzer V and VI. In reality, these tanks were quite different from the Panzer V Panther and the Panzer VI Tiger.

== Development ==
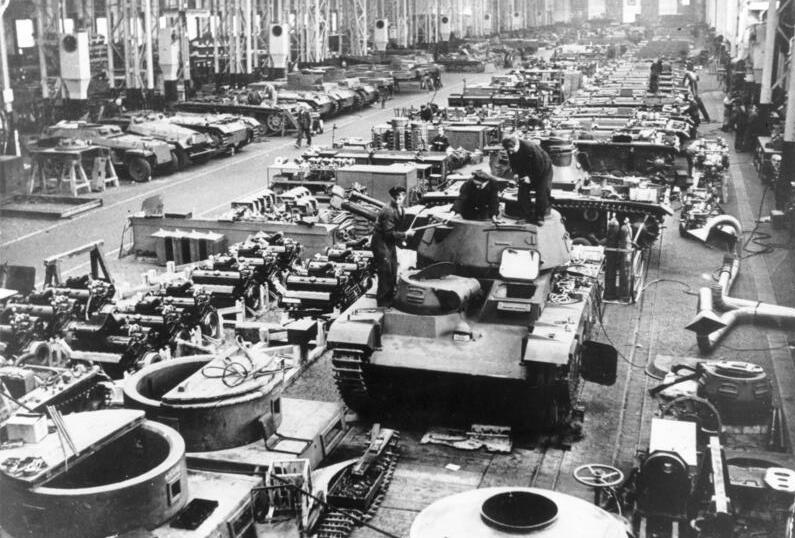
Neubaufahrzeug while being repaired

Development of the Neubaufahrzeug started in 1932 when the German department responsible for armoured vehicles design (Wa Prüf 6) established design specifications for a new 15 tonne tank to be known as the "mittlere Traktor" ("medium tractor"). It had many connections to the previous Großtraktor ("large tractor"), utilizing many of the same components including the engine and transmission. Initially both Krupp and Rheinmetall were asked to submit proposals, but after the end of trials of the Großtraktor prototypes, during which Rheinmetall's vehicle proved superior to others, Krupp would only be awarded a contract for a turret design while Rheinmetall was to design both a chassis and turret. Rheinmetall's turret design had a rounded shape and was armed with a 3.7 cm gun above the 7.5 cm gun, while Krupp's turret was more rectangular and had the 3.7 cm gun mounted beside the 7.5 cm gun. Both turrets were also armed with a co-axial 7.62 mm MG 34 machine gun, along with the two sub-turrets at the front and rear of the tank.

The Neubaufahrzeug went through a series of name changes, including "Groß Traktor Nachbau", "Mittlerer Traktor Neubau", and "Neubau Fahrzeug" in 1933, and "Neubau-Panzerkampfwagen IV" in April 1940. The Neubaufahrzeug was never officially named Panzerkampfwagen V or VI.

Two trial tanks constructed from mild steel were built by Rheinmetall in 1934. The first prototype used Rheinmetall's own turret design, while the second prototype used Krupp's turret design, which was mounted in 1935. Three more tanks were built in 1936 with proper armor, all with the Krupp design turret. The sub-turrets were also redesigned by a third contractor.

The Neubaufahrzeug was intended to fulfill the role of a medium tank in Germany's developing armored force, but it proved to have too many problems with its front drive and aero-engine for this role. But even with all its faults, the Neubaufahrzeug provided insight into tank designing that was valuable for the next German medium tank project, the Begleitwagen ("accompanying vehicle"), which would enter service as the Panzer IV.

== Service history ==
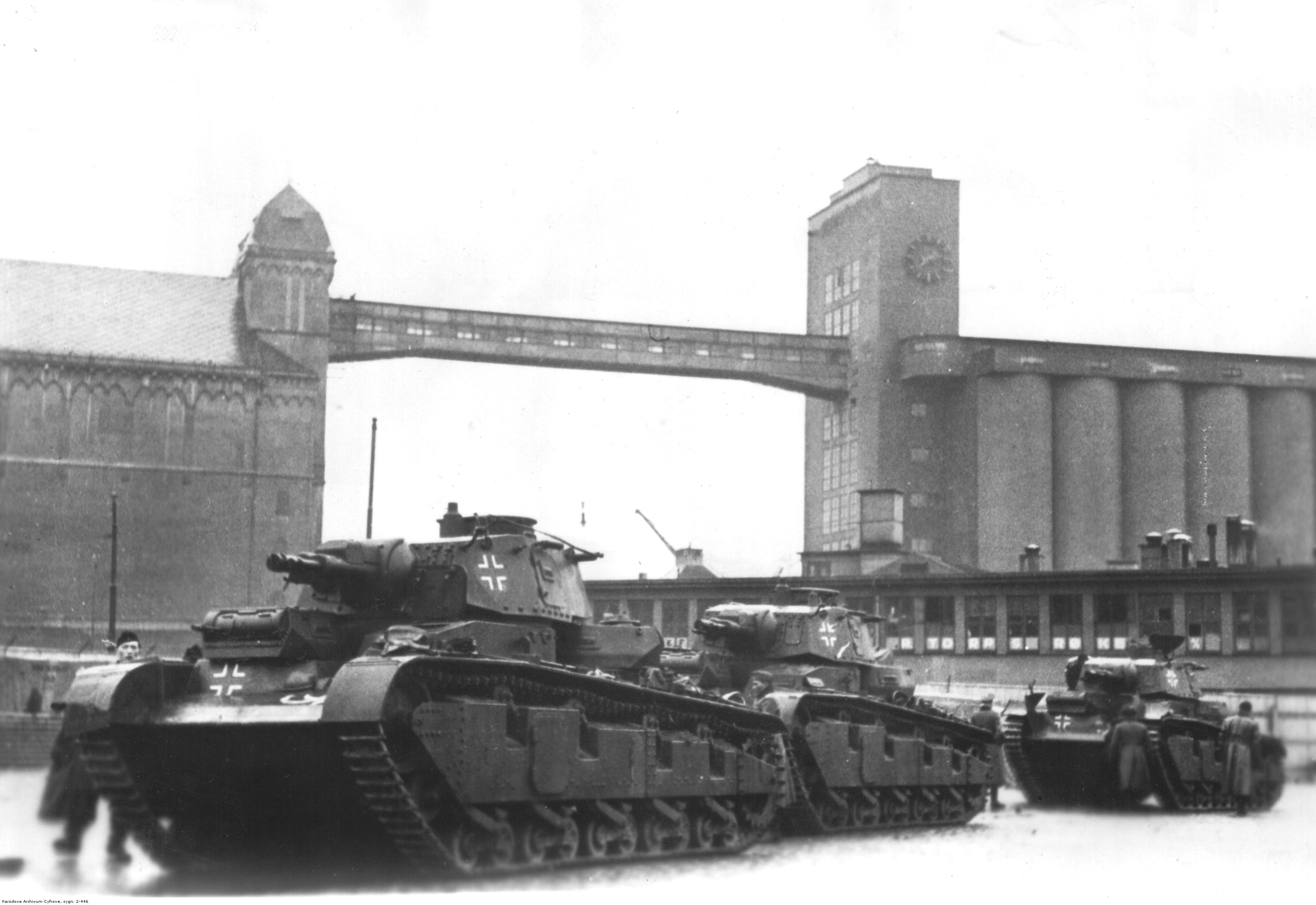
Three Neubaufahrzeuge arriving in Oslo Harbour, April 1940.

Though these tanks were never placed in serial production, they provided a propaganda tool for Nazi Germany, for example being shown at the International Automobile Exposition in Berlin in 1939.

This propaganda role was extended with the German invasion of Norway, when Panzer Abteilung z.b.V. 40 (40th Special-Purpose Tank Battalion) was formed for supporting the invasion of Norway, and the three Neubaufahrzeuge were assigned to that unit. One vehicle was assigned to Kampfgruppe Fischer advancing north through the Østerdalen Valley, while the other two were assigned to Kampfgruppe Pellengahr advancing up the Gudbrand Valley. The one assigned to Kampfgruppe Fischer was immobilized with mechanical problems on its way to Lillehammer, while one of the two assigned to Kampfgruppe Pellengahr also had mechanical problems just north of Lillehammer. Only one tank actually made it to the front; it was immediately put in action with the German force advancing up the Gudbrand Valley with other elements of Panzer Abteilung z.b.V. 40.

The Neubaufahrzeuge first saw combat against British and Norwegian positions on April 22, near the hill Balberg at the far south end of the Gudbrand Valley, 7 km north of Lillehammer. The British Expeditionary Force was equipped with 0.55 inch calibre Boys anti-tank rifles that easily penetrated the Neubaufahrzeug. After dozens of hits, including one that killed a crew member, the tank retreated and the crew was hesitant to advance further. Other German units pushed further through, flanking the British forces and forcing them to retreat.

It is unclear what happened to the tanks after the Norway campaign, but none of them survived the war. The surviving vehicles were ordered to be scrapped in 1941, and this took place in 1942 according to documents captured by the British in 1945. The dates when the vehicles were scrapped are unclear, but it is thought that the beginning of the construction of the Sturer Emil prototypes dates from the same time.

According to contemporary German sources, three NbFz were attached to the 1st Panzer Army and destroyed in battle with Soviet BT-7 tanks in present-day Ukraine in June 1941.

The last known surviving Neubaufahrzeug was used by a Lehr instruction unit in late 1944 as a target for training the Volkssturm in the use of the Panzerschreck (Raketenpanzerbüchse 54) and other anti-tank weapons.

All that survives of these tanks is a small number of running gear parts, preserved in the Gudbrandsdal Krigsminnesamling (Gudbrand Valley War Memorial collection), at Kvam in Norway.
