= 5 cm Pak 38 =

German anti-tank gun

5 cm Panzerabwehrkanone 38 (L/60)
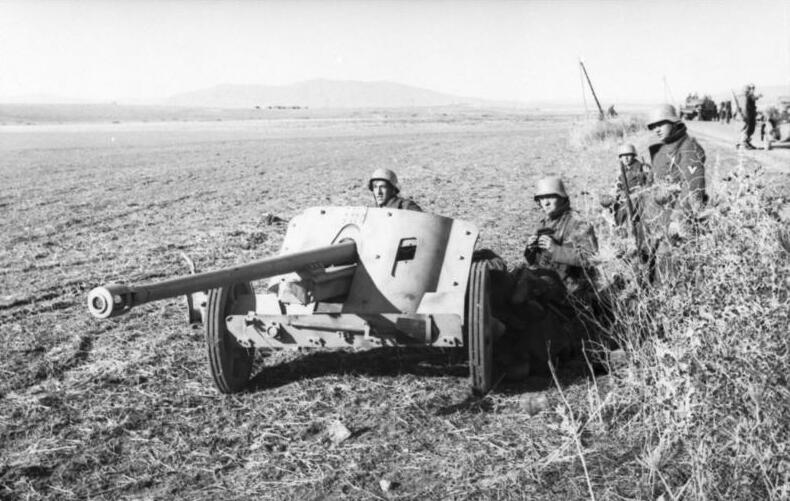
- German soldiers with 5cm Pak 38 during the Tunisian Campaign
- Type: Panzerabwehrkanone
- Place of origin: Nazi Germany

Service history
- In service: 1940–1945
- Used by: Nazi Germany; Italy; Finland; Hungary; Romania; Bulgaria; First Slovak republic
- Wars: World War II; Continuation War

Production history
- Designed: 1937–1939
- Manufacturer: Rheinmetall-Borsig
- Unit cost: 1,800 man-hours 10,600 ℛ︁ℳ︁
- Produced: 1940–1943
- No. built: 9,566

Specifications
- Mass: 1,000 kg (2,200 lb); 1,062 kg (2,341 lb) w/carriage
- Length: 4.75 m (15.6 ft)
- Barrel length: 297.5 cm (117.1 in) bore (60 calibres)
- Width: 1.85 m (6 ft 1 in)
- Height: 1.05 m (3 ft 5 in)
- Crew: 5
- Shell: Fixed QF 50×420mm R 5 cm Pzgr. 5 cm Pzgr. 39; 5 cm Pzgr. 40; 5 cm Pzgr. 40/1 5 cm Sprgr. 38
- Shell weight: 2.25 kg (4 lb 15 oz)
- Caliber: 50 mm (2.0 in)
- Action: Semi-automatic
- Breech: Horizontal sliding-wedge
- Recoil: Hydro-pneumatic
- Carriage: Split-trail
- Elevation: -8° to +27°
- Traverse: 65°
- Rate of fire: 13 rounds/min
- Muzzle velocity: 550-1,130 m/s (1,804-3,707 ft/s)
- Maximum firing range: 2,700 m (3,000 yd)
- Feed system: Manual
- Sights: Z.F. 3x8°

The 5 cm Pak 38 (L/60) (5 cm Panzerabwehrkanone 38 (L/60)) was a German anti-tank gun of 50 mm calibre. It was developed in 1938 by Rheinmetall-Borsig AG as a successor to the 3.7 cm Pak 36, and was in turn followed by the 7.5 cm Pak 40. The unique curved gun-shield design differed from most WWII anti-tank guns which had either one flat or two angled and one flat gun-shield plates for ease of manufacturing.

== Development ==
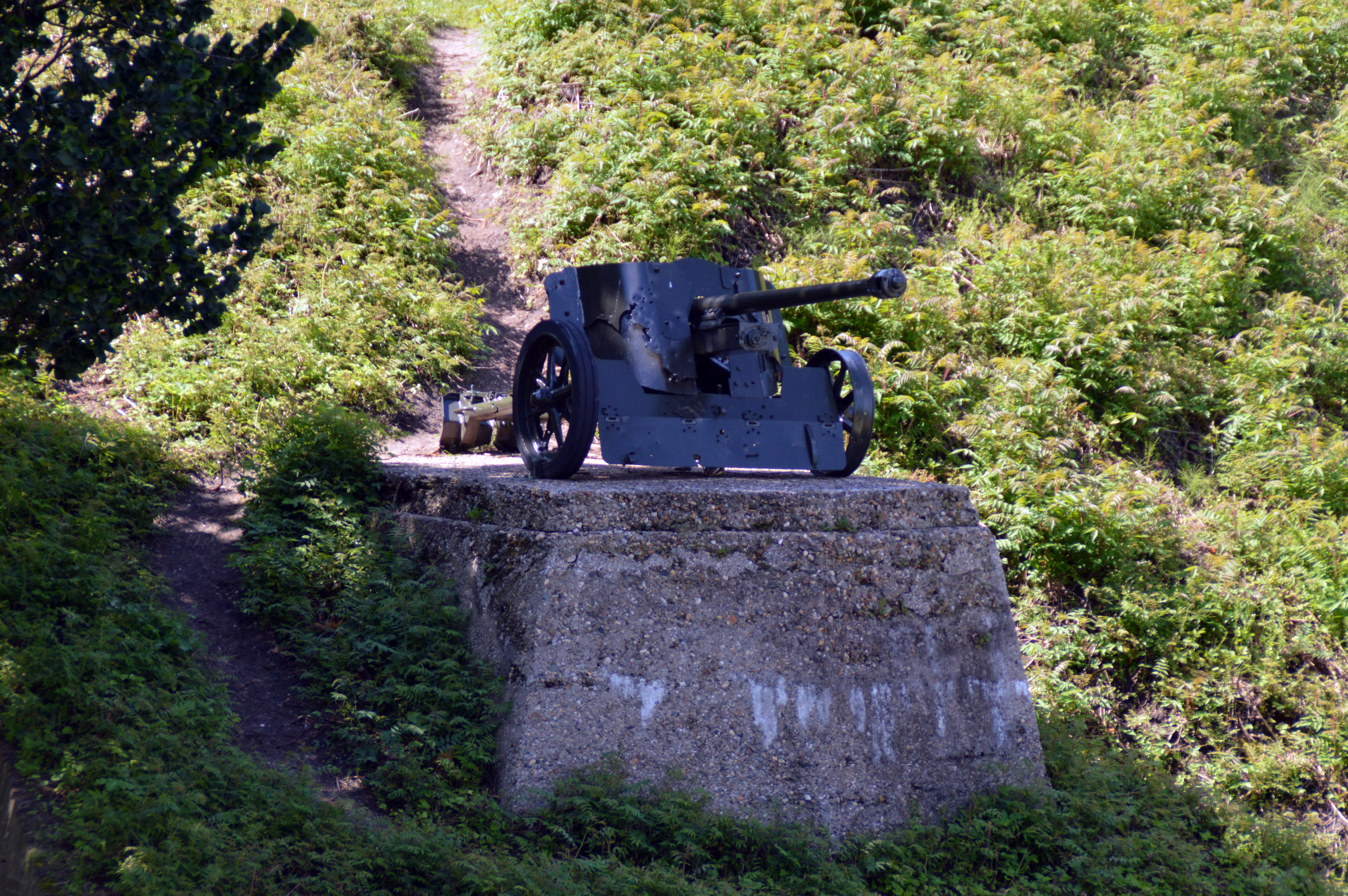
5 cm Pak 38 in the Hunnerpark, Nijmegen

After the Spanish Civil War, the German authorities started to think that a new anti-tank gun would be needed, even though the 3.7 cm Pak 36 had proven to be very successful. They asked Rheinmetall-Borsig to produce a new and more capable AT-gun. They first designed the Pak 37 in 1935, but the German authorities did not approve it because of its low capabilities. Rheinmetall-Borsig were forced to create a new gun with a longer - L/60 - barrel which was approved for mass production in 1939 under the designation Pak 38.

== Variants ==
The original tank gun for the Panzer III was the 5 cm KwK 38, which despite being the same 5 cm caliber had a lower muzzle velocity due to the shorter barrel length (L/42 calibers) and smaller cartridge. When a more powerful gun with greater penetration was needed for the Panzer III the longer barrel 5 cm KwK 39 gun (L/60 calibers) was developed as a variant of the 5 cm Pak 38 towed anti-tank gun.

== Service ==
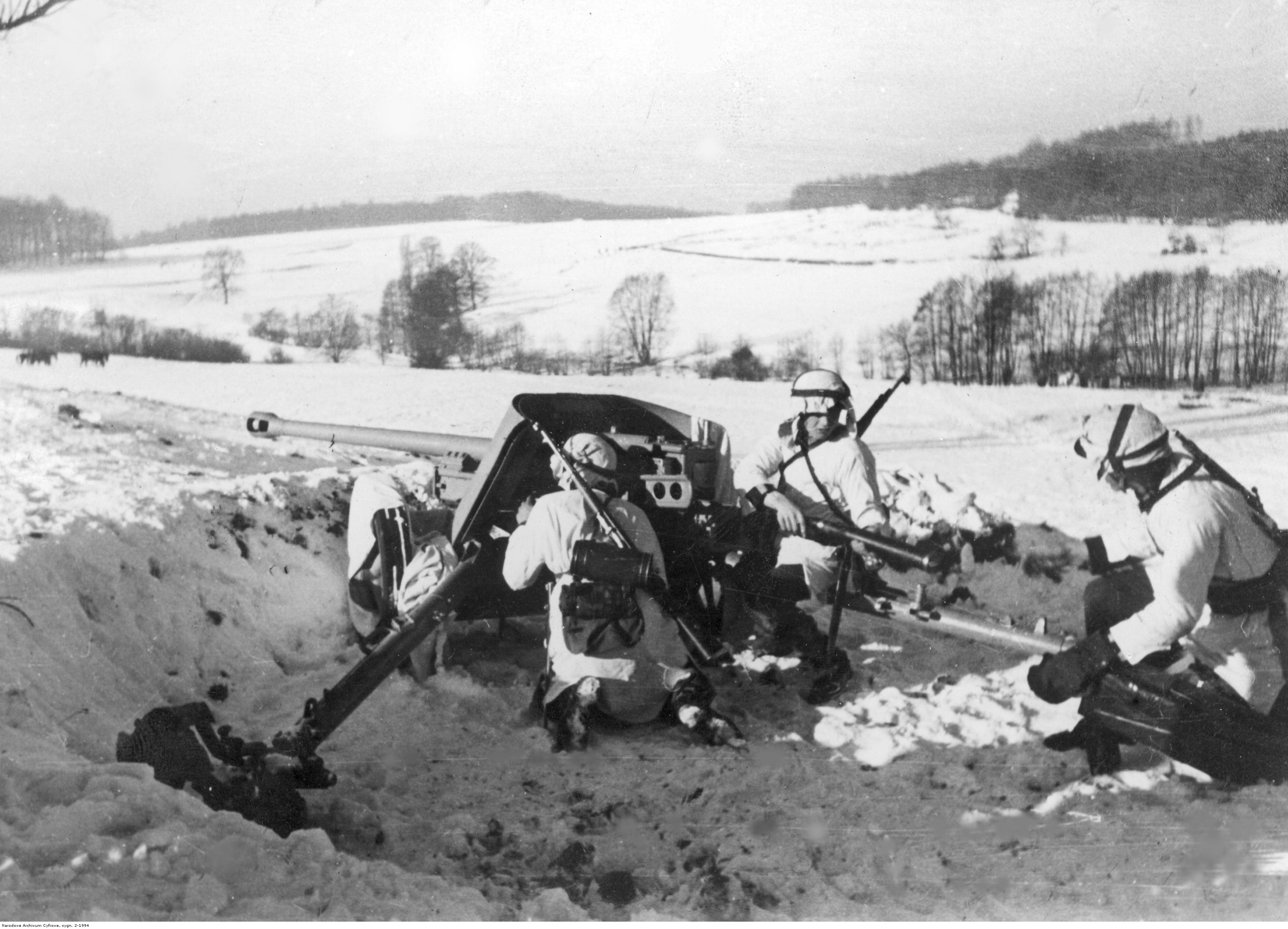
Pak 38 on the Eastern Front, 1944.

The Pak 38 was first used by the German forces during the Second World War in April 1941. When the Germans faced Soviet tanks in 1941 during Operation Barbarossa starting June 1941, the Pak 38 was one of the few guns capable of penetrating the 45 mm (1.8 in) sloped armor of the T-34 medium tank at close range. The gun was also equipped with Panzergranate 40 APCR shots with a hard tungsten carbide core, in an attempt to penetrate the armor of the heavier KV-1 tank.

Although it was replaced by more powerful weapons, it remained a useful weapon and remained in service with the Wehrmacht until the end of the war.

The Pak 38 carriage was also used for the 7.5 cm Pak 97/38 and the 7.5 cm Pak 50 guns.

Romania imported 110 Pak 38s in March 1943. The guns remained in service with the Romanian Armed Forces until 1954, when the 57 mm anti-tank gun M1943 (ZiS-2) replaced them.

== Performance ==
Calculated armor penetration
Range	Penetration at contact angle 0°
AP
100 m (110 yd)	100 mm (3.9 in)
500 m (550 yd)	79 mm (3.1 in)
1,000 m (1,100 yd)	60 mm (2.4 in)
1,500 m (1,600 yd)	45 mm (1.8 in)
APC
100 m (110 yd)	96 mm (3.8 in)
500 m (550 yd)	79 mm (3.1 in)
1,000 m (1,100 yd)	62 mm (2.4 in)
1,500 m (1,600 yd)	49 mm (1.9 in)
APCR
100 m (110 yd)	149 mm (5.9 in)
500 m (550 yd)	108 mm (4.3 in)
1,000 m (1,100 yd)	72 mm (2.8 in)
1,500 m (1,600 yd)	48 mm (1.9 in)
