= 5 cm KwK 39 =

German tank gun

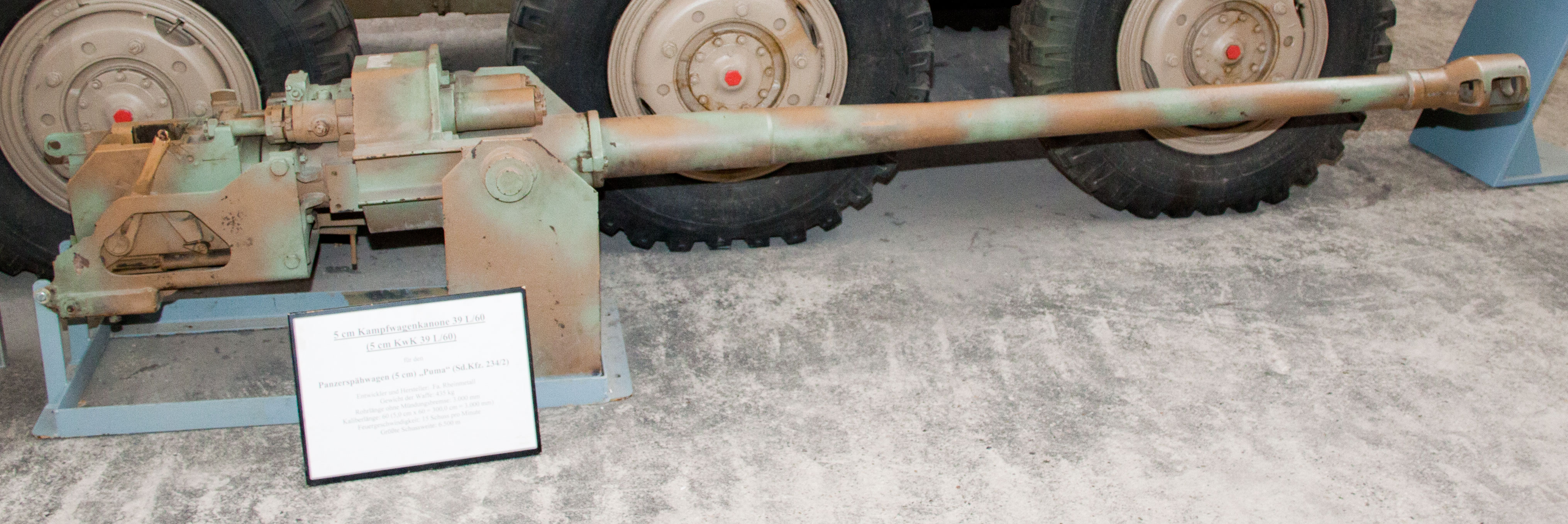
5 cm KwK 39/1 from a Sd. Kfz. 234/2 Schwerer Panzerspähwagen "Puma"

The 5 cm KwK 39 L/60 (5 cm Kampfwagenkanone 39 L/60) was a German 50 mm calibre tank gun used during the Second World War, primarily as the main armament of later models of the German Panzer III tank from December 1941 onwards. It was produced when the well-armoured T-34 and KV-1 tanks were encountered in ever increasing numbers on the Eastern Front, although it was only partially successful in its role. It was later superseded by the 7.5 cm KwK 40 L/43.

It was also mounted on the Sd.Kfz. 234/2 heavy armoured car, and adapted for mounting in the Me 410 aircraft.

== History ==
The gun was developed as a variant of the 5 cm Pak 38 towed anti-tank gun using the same ammunition. On the Panzer III, it replaced the 5 cm KwK 38, which had an L/42 calibre length, less powerful ammunition and a lower muzzle velocity. However, even the 5 cm KwK 39 gun with a longer barrel, higher muzzle velocity and more penetration was not sufficient against newer Soviet T-34 and KV-1 tanks. Therefore, as time went on, the Panzer III was no longer effective as a medium tank that could engage in fights with enemy tanks.

So, a new role for the Panzer III tank was found. On the Panzer III, the 5 cm KwK 39 was phased out in favor of the shorter but larger calibre 7.5 cm KwK 37 L/24 low velocity guns that could fire more effective HE and HEAT rounds. HE howitzer type rounds with explosive forces and shrapnel were very effective against infantry, machine gun nests and towed enemy guns on the battlefield. However, early HEAT rounds were somewhat unreliable. They were useful against hardened fortifications and had a good, though limited, capability against enemy armour. Thus, they were used against enemy tanks mostly in an emergency. With these changes, the Panzer III with the 7.5 cm KwK became an infantry support tank late in its career, while the new, much more capable 7.5 cm KwK 40 L/43 was mounted on the larger Panzer IV Ausf. F2 (and the longer L/48 on subsequent Ausf. versions) to fight the KV and T-34 tanks.

== Ammunition ==
Average penetration performance established against rolled homogenous steel armour plate laid back at 30° from the vertical. KwK 39 used shell 50×420 mm. R

PzGr (Armour-piercing)

- Weight of projectile: 2.06 kg (4 lb 9 oz)
- Muzzle velocity: 835 m/s (2,740 ft/s)

Penetration
Range	100 m (330 ft)	500 m (1,600 ft)	1,000 m (3,300 ft)	1,500 m (4,900 ft)	2,000 m (6,600 ft)
Penetration	67 mm (2.6 in)	57 mm (2.2 in)	44 mm (1.7 in)	34 mm (1.3 in)	—

PzGr. 39 (Armour-piercing, capped, ballistic cap)

- Weight of projectile: 2.06 kg (4 lb 9 oz)
- Muzzle velocity: 835 m/s (2,740 ft/s)

Penetration
Range	100 m (330 ft)	500 m (1,600 ft)	1,000 m (3,300 ft)	1,500 m (4,900 ft)	2,000 m (6,600 ft)
Penetration	69 mm (2.7 in)	59 mm (2.3 in)	48 mm (1.9 in)	37 mm (1.5 in)	—

PzGr. 40 (Armour-piercing, composite, rigid)

- Weight of projectile: 0.9 kg (2 lb 0 oz)
- Muzzle velocity: 1,180 m/s (3,900 ft/s)

Penetration
Range	100 m (330 ft)	500 m (1,600 ft)	1,000 m (3,300 ft)	1,500 m (4,900 ft)	2,000 m (6,600 ft)
Penetration	130 mm (5.1 in)	72 mm (2.8 in)	38 mm (1.5 in)	—	—

PzGr. 40/1 (Armour-piercing, composite, rigid)

- Weight of projectile: 1.06 kg (2 lb 5 oz)
- Muzzle velocity: 1,130 m/s (3,700 ft/s)

Penetration
Range	100 m (330 ft)	500 m (1,600 ft)	1,000 m (3,300 ft)	1,500 m (4,900 ft)	2,000 m (6,600 ft)
Penetration	116 mm (4.6 in)	76 mm (3.0 in)	—	—	—

Calculated penetration figures (at 90 degrees) using American and British 50% success criteria.
Gun type	Ammunition type	Muzzle velocity (m/s)	Penetration (mm)				
Gun type	Ammunition type	Muzzle velocity (m/s)	100 m	500 m	1000 m	1500 m	2000 m
5.0 cm KwK 39 L/60	Pzgr. 39 APCBC	835 m/s (2,740 ft/s)	102	85	68	54	43
5.0 cm KwK 39 L/60	Pzgr. 40 APCR	1,180 m/s (3,900 ft/s)	149	108	72	56	48

5 cm Sprgr.Patr.38 (High explosive)

- Weight of projectile: 1.82 kg (4 lb 0 oz)
- Muzzle velocity: 550 m/s (1,800 ft/s)

== Vehicles mounted on ==
- Panzerkampfwagen III (Sd. Kfz. 141/1) Ausf. J to M (serial production). Several earlier models were re-equipped with this gun.
- Sd. Kfz. 234/2 - eight wheel armoured car

== Aerial version ==
Bordkanone-series BK 5 heavy-caliber autocannon

== See also ==
- 5 cm KwK 38
- Rheinmetall BK-5

=== Weapons of comparable role, performance and era ===
- British Ordnance QF 6-pounder
- Soviet 57 mm anti-tank gun M1943 (ZiS-2)
