= 3.7 cm KwK 36 =

German tank gun

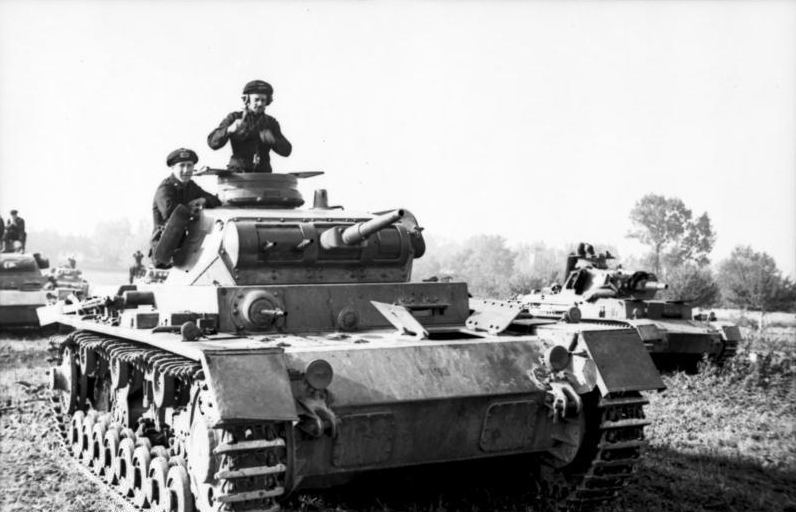
- Panzer III mounted with the 3.7 cm KwK 36
- Type: Tank gun
- Place of origin: Nazi Germany

Service history
- Used by: Nazi Germany
- Wars: World War II

Production history
- Produced: 1930s

Specifications
- Shell: 37 × 249 mm. R
- Caliber: 37 mm (1.45 in)
- Carriage: Turret
- Traverse: 360°
- Muzzle velocity: 762 m/s (2,500 ft/s)
- Effective firing range: 300 m (328 yds)
- Maximum firing range: 5,484 m (5,997 yds)

The 3.7 cm KwK 36 L/45 (3.7 cm Kampfwagenkanone 36 L/45) was a German 3.7 cm cannon used primarily as the main armament of earlier variants of the German Sd.Kfz. 141 Panzerkampfwagen III medium tank. It was used during the Second World War.

It was essentially the 3.7 cm Pak 36 modified for use in a rotating enclosed turret.

== Ammunition ==
The 3.7 cm KwK 36 used the 37 x 249 mm. R cartridge. Average penetration performance established against rolled homogeneous steel armor plate laid back at 30° from the vertical.

PzGr.18 (Armour-piercing)

- Weight of projectile: 0.658 kg (1 lb 7.2 oz)
- Muzzle velocity: 745 m/s (2,440 ft/s)

100 m	500 m	1000 m	1500 m	2000 m
34 mm	29 mm	23 mm	19 mm	--

PzGr.40 (Armour-piercing composite rigid)

- Weight of projectile: 0.368 kg (13.0 oz)
- Muzzle velocity: 1,020 m/s (3,300 ft/s)

100 m	500 m	1000 m	1500 m	2000 m
64 mm	31 mm	--	--	--

PzGr.39 - Armour-piercing

Sprgr.Patr.34 - High-explosive

Calculated penetration (at 90 degrees) using American and British 50% success criteria, and allowing comparison to performance of other guns.
Ammunition type	Muzzle velocity	Penetration				
Ammunition type	Muzzle velocity	100 m	500 m	1000 m	1500 m	2,000 m (6,600 ft)
Pzgr. APHE	745 m/s	64 mm (2.5 in)	52 mm (2.0 in)	40 mm (1.6 in)	30 mm (1.2 in)	23 mm (0.91 in)
Pzgr. 40 APCR	1,020 m/s	90 mm (3.5 in)	48 mm (1.9 in)	22 mm (0.87 in)	--	--

Revised penetration statistics due to HE burster size, projectile weight, and possible decreases of early war metal quality.
Ammunition type	Muzzle velocity	Penetration										
Ammunition type	Muzzle velocity	100 m	250 m	500 m	750 m	1000 m	1250 m	1500 m	1750 m	2000 m	2500 m	3,000 m (9,800 ft)
Pzgr. APHE	745 m/s	49 mm (1.9 in)	45 mm (1.8 in)	40 mm (1.6 in)	35 mm (1.4 in)	30 mm (1.2 in)	27 mm (1.1 in)	23 mm (0.91 in)	20 mm (0.79 in)	18 mm (0.71 in)	14 mm (0.55 in)	11 mm (0.43 in)

== Vehicles mounted on ==
- Leichttraktor
- Neubaufahrzeug
- Sd.Kfz. 141 Panzerkampfwagen III versions A until E (de: Ausfertigung A bis E)
- Sd.Kfz. 141 Panzerkampfwagen III Ausf. F (the last 100 Ausf. F mounted the 5 cm KwK 38 L/42 gun)
- Sd.Kfz. 141 Panzerkampfwagen III Ausf. G (the first 50 Ausf. G)

== Notes ==
2. http://www.wehrmacht-history.com/heer/panzer-armaments/3.7-cm-kwk-36.htm
