= 5 cm KwK 38 =

German tank weapon

5 cm KwK 38 (L/42)
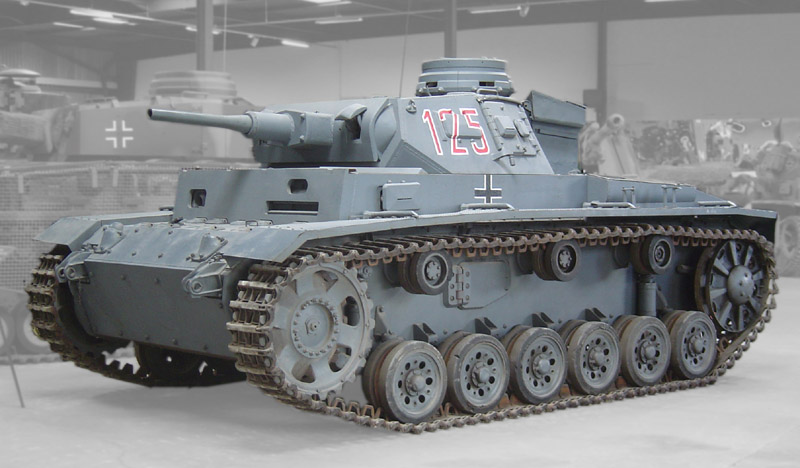
- Panzer III H with 5 cm KwK 38 L/42
- Type: Kampfwagenkanone
- Place of origin: Germany

Service history
- Used by: Nazi Germany
- Wars: World War II

Production history
- Unit cost: 8,000 RM

Specifications
- Mass: 400 kg (881.8 lb)
- Barrel length: 210 cm (83 in) bore (42 calibers)
- Shell: Fixed ammunition 50 mm × 289 mm (2.0 in × 11.4 in) R
- Shell weight: 2.07 kg (4.56 lb) armor-piercing (APC-HE) Pzgr. 39
- Caliber: 50 mm (1.97 in)
- Elevation: -10° to +20°
- Muzzle velocity: 685 m/s (2,250 ft/s)

The 5 cm KwK 38 L/42 (5 cm Kampfwagenkanone 38 L/42) was a German 50 mm 42 calibre cannon used as the main armament of variants of the German Panzer III medium tank during the Second World War. The towed anti-tank gun equivalent was the PaK.37 of which 2,600 were produced from 1937 until 1940.

== History ==
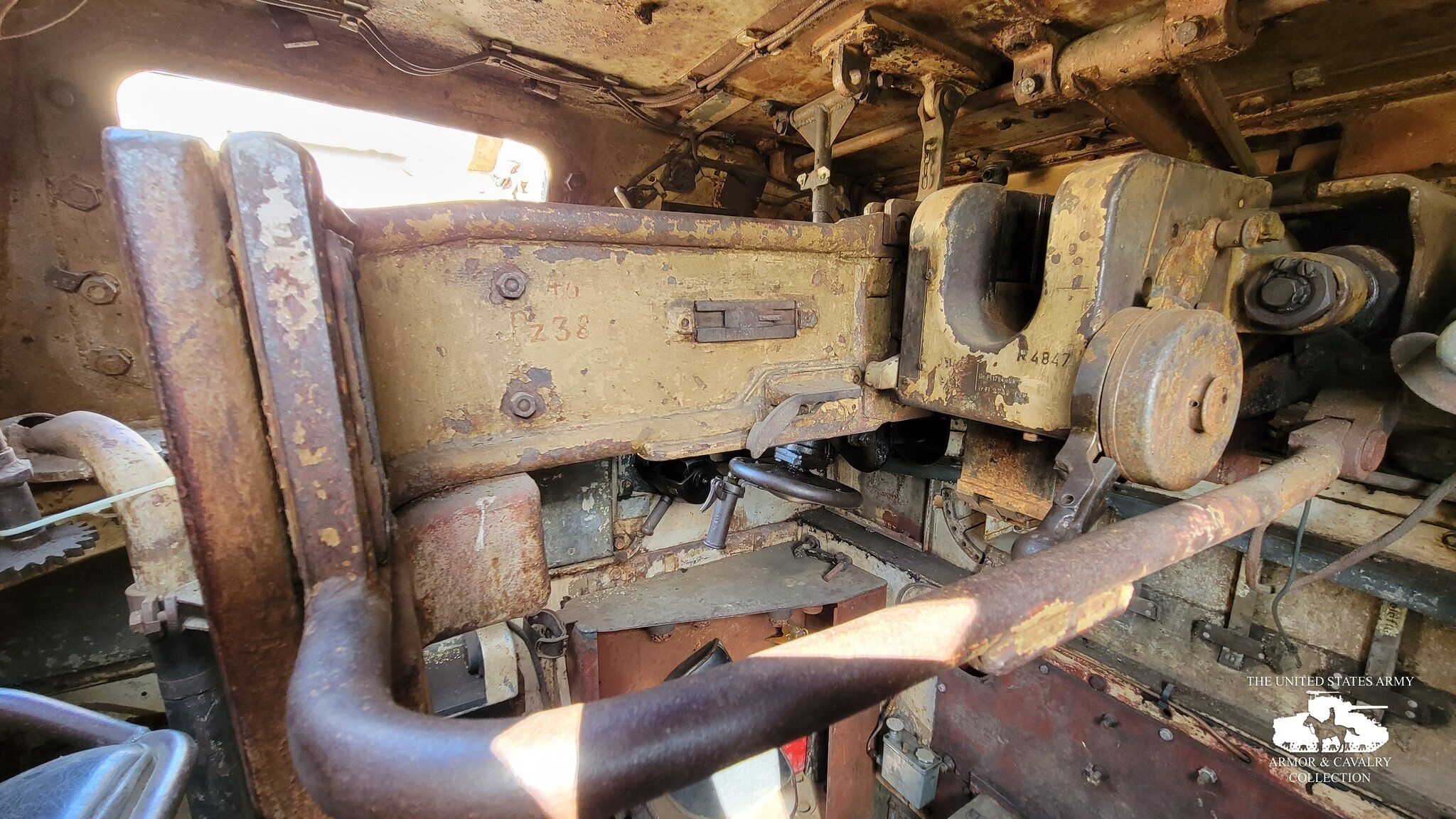
Breech of a 5 cm KwK 38 L/42 in a Panzer III Ausf. F

The Panzer III was intended to fight other tanks; in the initial design stage a 50-millimetre (1.97 in) gun was specified. However, the infantry at the time were being equipped with the 37 mm (1.46 in) 3.7 cm PaK 36, and it was thought that, in the interest of standardization, the tanks should carry the same armament. As a compromise, the turret ring was made large enough to accommodate a 50 mm (1.97 in) gun should a future upgrade be required. This single decision later assured the Panzer III a prolonged life in the German Army.

The early Panzer III Ausf. A to early Ausf. G were equipped with a 3.7 cm KwK 36 L/45, which proved adequate during the campaigns of 1939 and 1940. In response to increasingly better armed and armored opponents, the later Panzer III Ausf. F to Ausf. J were upgraded with the 5 cm KwK 38 L/42. And the later Panzer III Ausf. J¹ to M went with the longer 5 cm KwK 39 L/60 gun.

== Ammunition ==
Average penetration performance established against rolled homogenous steel armour plate laid back at 30° from the vertical.

PzGr (Armour Piercing)

- Weight of projectile: 2.06 kg (4.5 lb)
- Muzzle velocity: 685 m/s (2,250 ft/s)

| Range | 100 m (330 ft) | 500 m (1,600 ft) | 1,000 m (3,300 ft) | 1,500 m (4,900 ft) |
|---|---|---|---|---|
| Penetration | 53 mm (2.1 in) | 43 mm (1.7 in) | 32 mm (1.3 in) | 24 mm (0.94 in) |

PzGr. 39 (Armour-piercing, capped, ballistic cap)

- Weight of projectile: 2.06 kg
- Muzzle velocity: 685 m/s

| Range | 100 m (330 ft) | 500 m (1,600 ft) | 1,000 m (3,300 ft) | 1,500 m (4,900 ft) |
|---|---|---|---|---|
| Penetration | 55 mm (2.2 in) | 47 mm (1.9 in) | 37 mm (1.5 in) | 28 mm (1.1 in) |

PzGr. 40 (Armour-piercing, composite, rigid)

- Weight of projectile: 0.925 kg (2.04 lb)
- Muzzle velocity: 1,050 m/s (3,400 ft/s)

| Range | 100 m (330 ft) | 500 m (1,600 ft) | 1,000 m (3,300 ft) | 1,500 m (4,900 ft) |
|---|---|---|---|---|
| Penetration | 94 mm (3.7 in) | 55 mm (2.2 in) | — | — |

Estimated penetration (at 90 degrees) using American and British 50% success criteria, and allowing comparison to performance of other guns.
| Ammunition type | Muzzle velocity | Penetration | | | | |
| Ammunition type | Muzzle velocity | 100 m | 500 m | 1000 m | 1500 m | 2,000 m (6,600 ft) |
|---|---|---|---|---|---|---|
| AP | 2,247 ft/s (685 m/s) | 76 mm (3.0 in) | 58 mm (2.3 in) | 41 mm (1.6 in) | 29 mm (1.1 in) | 21 mm (0.83 in) |
| Pzgr. 40 APCR | 1,050 m/s (3,400 ft/s) | 107 mm (4.2 in) | 74 mm | 47 mm (1.9 in) | 30 mm (1.2 in) | 20 mm |

== Vehicles mounted on ==
- Panzer III (Sd. Kfz. 141) - Ausf. F to J (serial production), several earlier models were re-equipped with this gun.
- VK 20 series proposed replacement of the Panzer III and IV

== See also ==
- 5 cm KwK 39

=== Weapons of comparable role, performance and era ===
- Ordnance QF 2-pounder: British 40mm tank and anti-tank gun
- 45 mm anti-tank gun M1932 (19-K): Soviet tank gun
- 37 mm gun M3: US tank gun
