= Panzer III =

German medium tank of the 1930s and World War II

Panzerkampfwagen III Sd.Kfz. 141
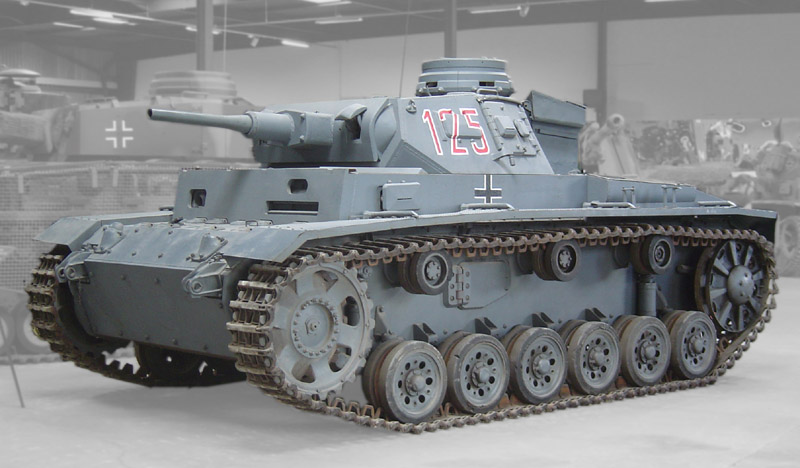
- Panzer III Ausf. F at Musée des Blindés, France
- Type: Medium tank
- Place of origin: Nazi Germany

Service history
- In service: 1939–1945
- Used by: Germany; Hungary; Romania; Slovak Republic; Croatia; Norway; Turkey
- Wars: World War II

Production history
- Designer: Daimler-Benz
- Designed: 1935–1937
- Manufacturer: Daimler-Benz
- Unit cost: 103,163 ℛ︁ℳ︁ (Ausf. M)
- Produced: 1939–1943
- No. built: 5,774 (excluding StuG III)

Specifications
- Mass: 23.0 tonnes (25.4 short tons)
- Length: 5.56 m (18 ft 3 in)
- Width: 2.90 m (9 ft 6 in)
- Height: 2.5 m (8 ft 2 in)
- Crew: 5 (commander, gunner, loader, driver, radio operator/bow machine-gunner)
- Armour: Ausf A - C: 15 mm all around Ausf D - G: 30 mm all around Ausf J+: 50 mm all around
- Main armament: 1 × 3.7 cm KwK 36 Ausf. A - G 1 × 5 cm KwK 38 Ausf. F - J 1 × 5 cm KwK 39 Ausf. J¹- M 1 × 7.5 cm KwK 37 Ausf. N
- Secondary armament: 2–3 × 7.92 mm MG 34 machine gun
- Engine: 12-cylinder Maybach HL120 TRM petrol engine 300 PS (295 hp, 220 kW)
- Power/weight: 12 hp (9.6 kW) / tonne
- Suspension: Torsion-bar suspension
- Fuel capacity: 300–320 L (66–70 imp gal; 79–85 US gal)
- Operational range: Road: 165 km (103 mi); Cross-country: 85 km (53 mi)
- Maximum speed: Road: 40 km/h (25 mph); Off-road: 20 km/h (12 mph)

The Panzerkampfwagen III (Pz.Kpfw. III), commonly known as the Panzer III, was a medium tank developed in the 1930s by Germany, and was used extensively in World War II. The official German ordnance designation was Sd.Kfz. 141. It was intended to fight other armoured fighting vehicles and serve alongside and support the similar Panzer IV, which was originally designed for infantry support.

Initially, the Panzer III had the same 3.7 cm gun as the infantry used in an anti-tank role, but later models were given the 5 cm KwK 38 gun. This was the largest gun that could be fitted within the physical limitations of the turret ring, but it turned out to be ineffective against Soviet T-34 and KV-1 tanks. The Panzer IV, which had a larger turret ring, was redesigned to mount the long-barrelled 7.5 cm KwK 40 gun and became the main German tank instead. Produced from 1942 onwards, the last version of the Panzer III (Panzer III N) mounted the short barrelled 7.5 cm KwK 37 L/24 which was used on the first Panzer IVs, meaning the Panzer III and the Panzer IV had effectively swapped roles.

Production of the Panzer III ceased in 1943, but the StuG III assault gun, which was based on the Panzer III chassis, remained in production until the end of the war. About 18,000 vehicles based on the Panzer III chassis were produced between all variants --- by far the most of any German AFV design in World War II, and accounting for over a quarter of all tanks and assault guns produced by Nazi Germany.

== Development history ==
=== Background ===
At the time, German (non-light) tanks were expected to carry out one of two primary tasks when assisting infantry in breakthroughs, exploiting gaps in the enemy lines where opposition had been removed, moving through and attacking the enemy's unprotected lines of communication and the rear areas. The first task was direct combat against other tanks and other armoured vehicles, requiring the tank to fire armour piercing (AP) shells.

On January 11, 1934, following specifications laid down by Heinz Guderian, the Army Weapons Department drew up plans for a medium tank with a maximum weight of 24,000 kg (53,000 lb) and a top speed of 35 km/h (22 mph). It was intended as the main tank of the German Panzer divisions, capable of engaging and destroying opposing tank forces, and was to be paired with the Panzer IV, which was to fulfill the second use: dealing with anti-tank guns and infantry strong points, such as machine-gun nests, firing high-explosive shells at such soft targets. Such supportive tanks designed to operate with friendly infantry against the enemy were generally heavier and carried more armour.

The direct infantry-support role was to be provided by the turret-less Sturmgeschütz assault gun, which mounted a short-barrelled gun on a Panzer III chassis.

=== Development ===
Daimler-Benz, Krupp, MAN, and Rheinmetall all produced prototypes. Testing of these took place in 1936 and 1937, leading to the Daimler-Benz design being chosen for production. The first model of the Panzer III, the Ausführung A. (Ausf. A), came off the assembly line in May 1937; ten, two of which were unarmed, were produced in that year. Mass production of the Ausf. F version began in 1939. Between 1937 and 1940, attempts were made to standardize parts between Krupp's Panzer IV and Daimler-Benz's Panzer III.

Much of the early development work on the Panzer III was a quest for a suitable suspension. Several varieties of leaf-spring suspensions were tried on Ausf. A through Ausf. D, usually using eight relatively small-diameter road wheels before the torsion-bar suspension of the Ausf. E was standardized, using the six road wheel design that became standard. The Panzer III, along with the Soviet KV heavy tank, was one of the early tanks to use this suspension design first seen on the Stridsvagn L-60 a few years earlier.

A distinct feature of the Panzer III, influenced by the British Vickers Medium Mark I tank (1924), was the three-man turret. This meant that the commander was not distracted with another role in the tank (e.g. as gunner or loader) and could fully concentrate on maintaining awareness of the situation and directing the tank. Most tanks of the time did not have this capability, providing the Panzer III with a combat advantage versus such tanks. For example, the French Somua S-35's turret was manned only by the commander, and the Soviet T-34 originally had a two-man turret crew. Unlike the Panzer IV, the Panzer III had no turret basket, merely a foot rest platform for the gunner. (Note: Whether a basket was added in Ausf. H is disputed:)

The Panzer III was intended as the primary battle tank of the German forces. However, on the Eastern front, the Panzer III proved to be inferior in both armour and firepower to the Soviet KV-1 heavy tanks and T-34 medium tanks. In response, the Panzer III was up-gunned to the 5 cm KwK 39, a longer, more powerful 50-millimetre (1.97 in) gun, and received more armour but still was at disadvantage compared with the Soviet tank designs. As a result, production of self-propelled anti-tank guns (Panzerjäger), as well as the up-gunning of the Panzer IV was initiated.

In 1942, the final version of the Panzer III, the Ausf. N, was created with a 75-millimetre (2.95 in) KwK 37 L/24 cannon, the same short-barreled low-velocity gun used for the initial models of the Panzer IV and designed for anti-infantry and close-support work. For defensive purposes, the Ausf. N was equipped with rounds of HEAT ammunition that could penetrate 70 to 100 millimetres (2.76 to 3.94 in) of armour depending on the round's variant, but these were strictly used for self-defence.

=== Armour ===
The Panzer III Ausf. A through C had 15 mm (0.59 in) of rolled homogeneous armour on all sides with 10 mm (0.39 in) on the top and 5 mm (0.20 in) on the bottom. This was quickly determined to be insufficient, and was upgraded to 30 mm (1.18 in) on the front, sides and rear in the Ausf. D, E, F, and G models, with the H model having a second 30 mm (1.18 in) layer of face-hardened steel applied to the front and rear hull. The Ausf. J model had a solid 50 mm (1.97 in) plate on the front and rear, while the Ausf. J¹, L, and M models had an additional layer of offset 20 mm (0.79 in) homogeneous steel plate on the front hull and turret, with the M model having an additional 5 mm (0.20 in) Schürzen spaced armour on the hull sides, and 8 mm (0.31 in) on the turret sides and rear. This additional frontal armor gave the Panzer III frontal protection from many light and medium Allied and Soviet anti-tank guns at all but close ranges. However, the sides were still vulnerable to many enemy weapons, including anti-tank rifles at close ranges.

=== Armament ===
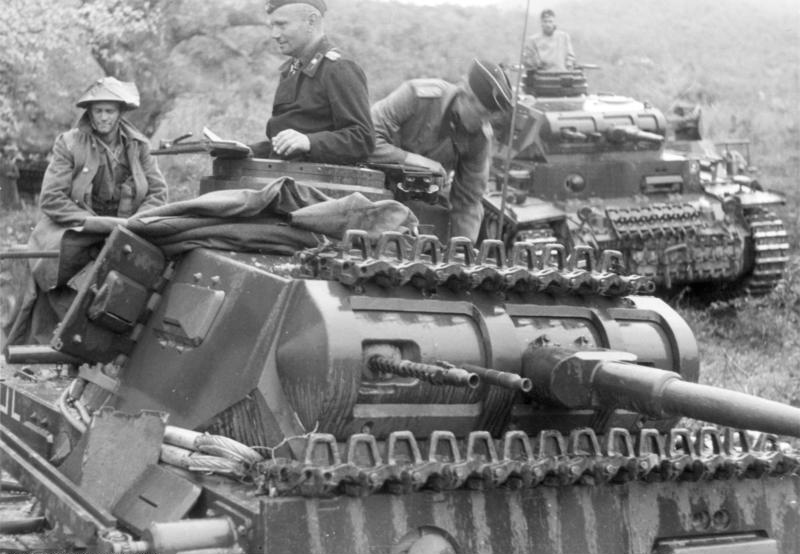
General Hermann Balck (standing left in the cupola) in a Panzerbefehlswagen III Ausf. H command tank in Greece in April 1941. This vehicle is fitted with a dummy 37mm main gun and a dummy MG 34 co-axial machine gun but has an actual ball-mounted MG 34 machine gun on the right side of the turret's mantlet.

The Panzer III was intended to fight other tanks; in the initial design stage a 50-millimetre (1.97 in) gun was specified. However, the infantry at the time were being equipped with the 37-millimetre (1.46 in) PaK 36, and it was thought that, in the interest of standardization, the tanks should carry the same armament. As a compromise, the turret ring was made large enough to accommodate a 50-millimetre (1.97 in) gun should a future upgrade be required. This single decision later assured the Panzer III a prolonged life in the German Army.

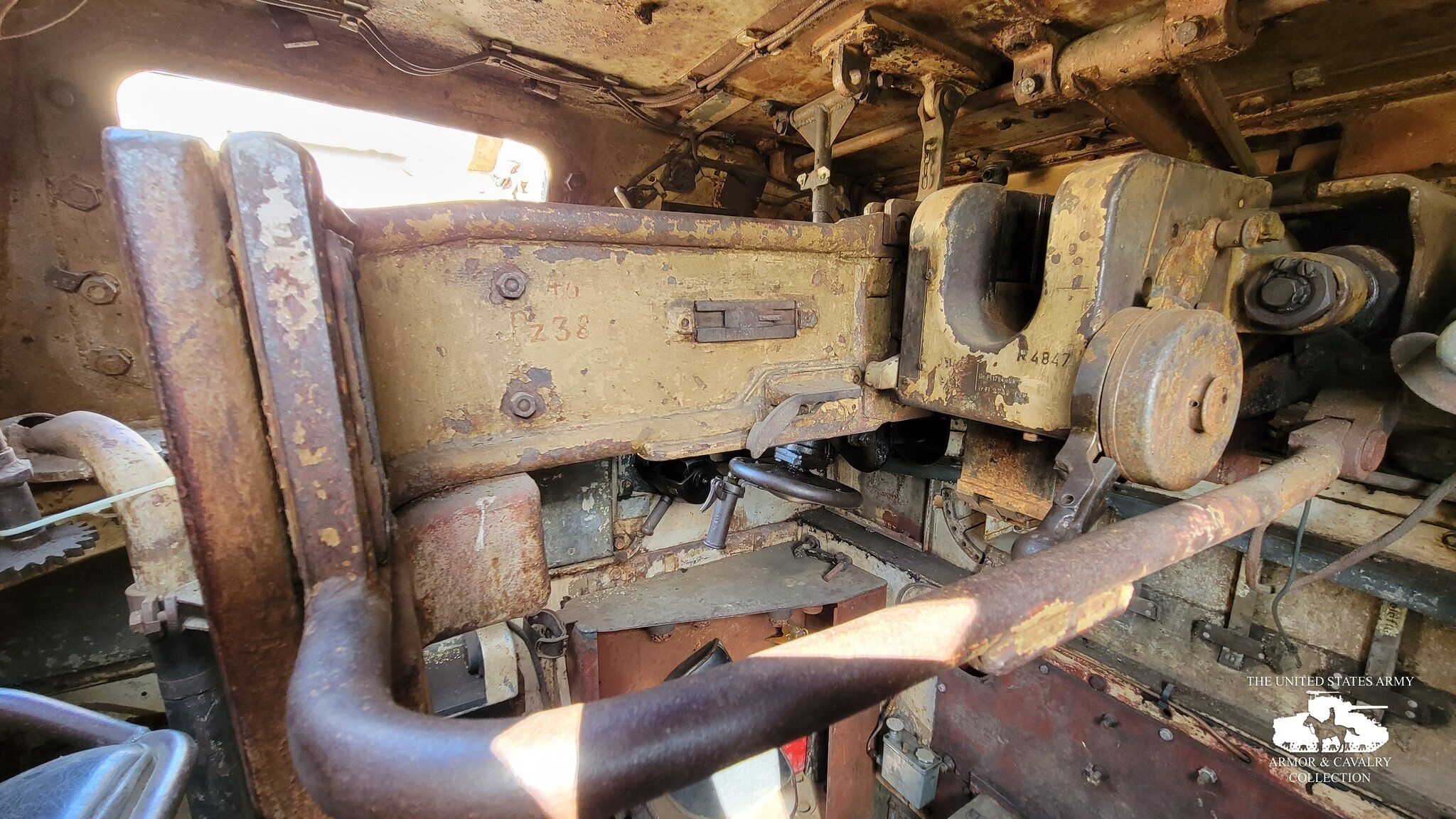
Breech of the 5 cm KwK 38 L/42 of an Ausf. F

The Ausf. A to early Ausf. G were equipped with a 3.7 cm KwK 36 L/45, which proved adequate during the campaigns of 1939 and 1940. In response to increasingly better armed and armored opponents, the later Ausf. F to Ausf. J were upgraded with the 5 cm KwK 38 L/42, and the Ausf. J¹ to M with the longer 5 cm KwK 39 L/60 gun.

By 1942, the Panzer IV was becoming Germany's main medium tank because of its better upgrade potential. The Panzer III remained in production as a close support vehicle. The Ausf. N model mounted a low-velocity 7.5 cm KwK 37 L/24 gun - these guns had originally been fitted to older Panzer IV Ausf A to F1 models and had been placed in storage when those tanks had also been up armed to longer versions of the 75 mm gun.

All early models up to and including the Ausf. G had two 7.92 mm (0.31 in) MG 34 machine guns mounted coaxially with the 37 mm main gun and a similar weapon in a hull mount. Models from the Ausf. F and later, upgraded or built with a 5 or 7.5 cm main gun, had a single coaxial MG 34 and the hull MG34.

A single experimental Ausf. L was fitted with a 75/55mm tapered bore Waffe 0725 cannon. The vehicle was designated Panzer III Ausf L mit Waffe 0725.

=== Mobility ===
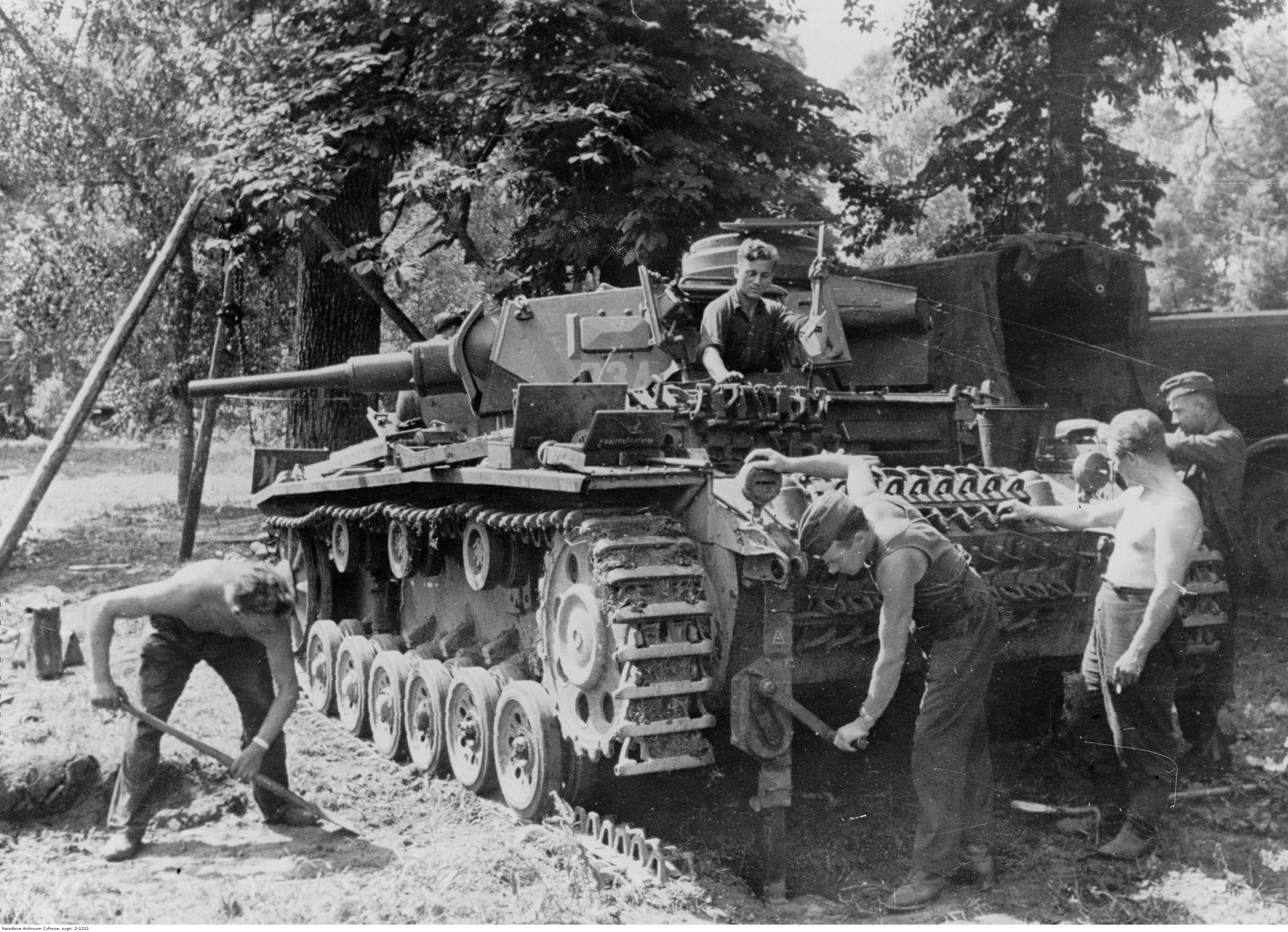
Service inspection of a Panzer III Ausf. H in the field; the vehicle is lifted with the standard tank jack carried on-board and the tracks are being removed.

Difference of suspension in all variants

The Panzer III Ausf. A to D were powered by a 250 PS (184 kW), 12-cylinder Maybach HL108 TR engine, giving a top speed of 35 km/h (22 mph). All later models were powered by the 300 PS (221 kW), 12-cylinder Maybach HL 120 TRM engine. Regulated top speed varied, depending on the transmission and weight, but was around 40 km/h (25 mph).

The fuel capacity was 300 L (79 US gal) in Ausf A-D, 310 L (82 US gal) in Ausf. E-G and 320 L (85 US gal) in all later models. Road range on the main tank was 165 km (103 mi) in Ausf. A-J; the heavier later models had a reduced range of 155 km (96 mi). Cross-country range was 95 km (59 mi) in all versions.

== Combat history ==
The Panzer III was used in the German campaigns in Poland, in France, in the Soviet Union, and in North Africa. Many were still in combat service against Western Allied forces in 1944-1945: at Anzio in Italy, (Note: Used by Fallschirm-Panzer Division 1 Hermann Göring) in Normandy, (Note: Served with Panzer Ersatz und Ausbildungs Abteilung 100 and 9th Panzer Division) in Operation Market Garden in the Netherlands and in East Prussia against the Red Army. (Note: Some tanks used for training by the Hermann Göring Training and Replacement Regiment were pressed into service to oppose the British advance in Operation Market Garden.) A sizeable number of Panzer IIIs also remained as armoured reserves in German-occupied Norway and some saw action, alongside Panzer IVs, in the Lapland War against Finland in the fall of 1944.

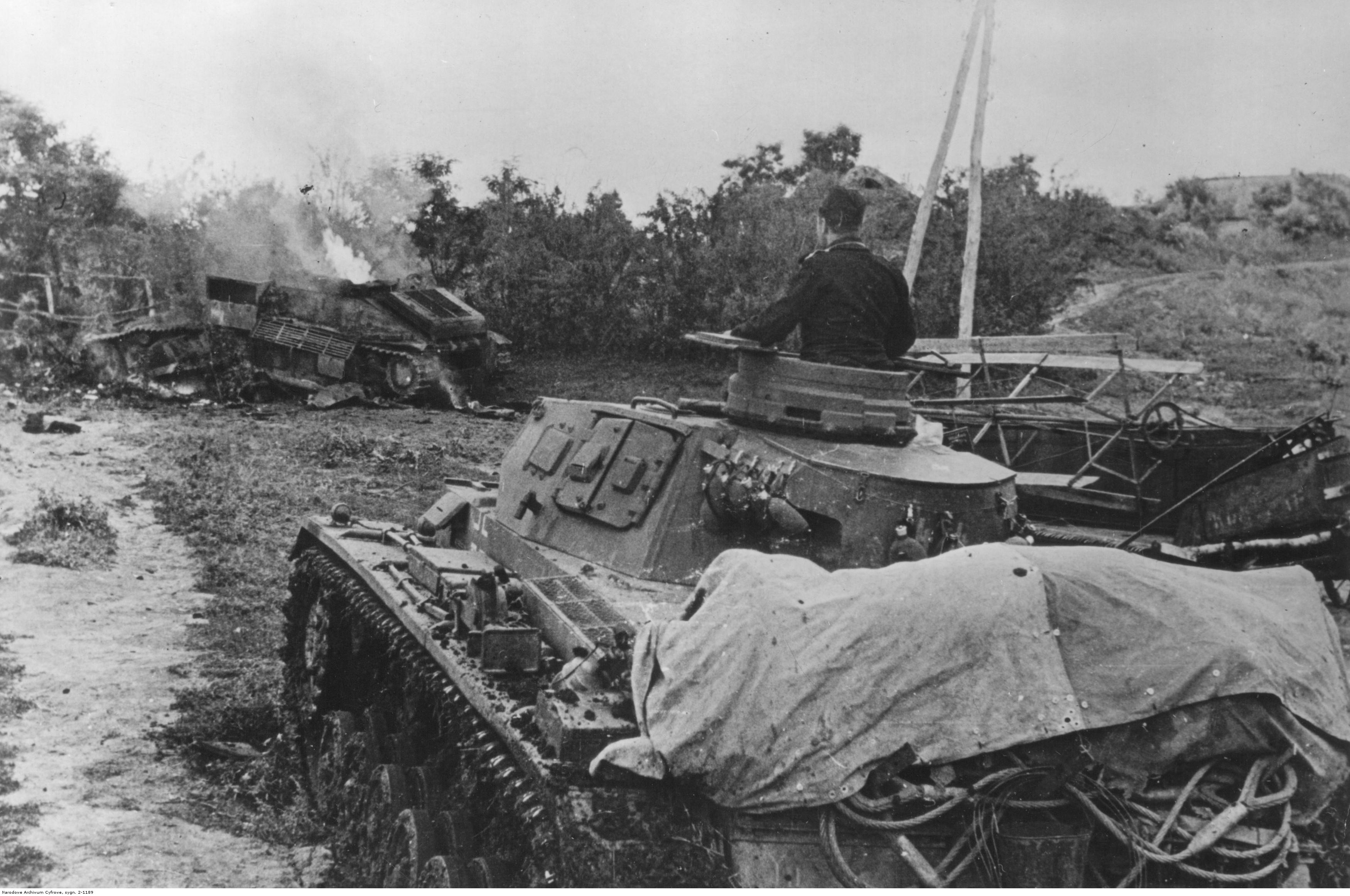
A Panzerkampfwagen III Ausf. G in Russia. A knocked out Soviet T-28 lies in the background around August 1941. This photo was presumably taken during the early stages of Operation Barbarossa.

In both the Polish and French campaigns, the Panzer III formed a small part of the German armoured forces. Only a few hundred Panzer III Ausf. As to Fs were available in these two campaigns, with most being armed with the 37 mm (1.46 in) main gun. They were the best medium tank available to the German military at the period of time.

Aside from use in Europe, the Panzer III also saw service in North Africa with Erwin Rommel's renowned Afrika Korps from early 1941. Most of the Panzer IIIs with the Afrika Korps were equipped with the (short-barrelled) KwK 38 L/42 50mm tank gun, with a small number possessing the older 37mm main gun of earlier variants. The Panzer IIIs of Rommel's troops were capable of fighting against British Crusader cruiser and US-supplied M3 Stuart light tanks with positive outcomes, although they did less effectively against heavily armoured Matilda II infantry tanks and the American M3 Lee/Grant medium tanks (fielded by the British starting from early 1942). In particular, the 75mm hull-mounted gun of the Lee/Grant tank could easily destroy a Panzer III far beyond the latter's own effective firing range, as did the similarly equipped M4 Sherman, which first saw combat with British forces in North Africa in October 1942.

Around the time of the beginning of Operation Barbarossa in the summer of 1941, the Panzer III was, numerically, the most important German tank on the frontline. At this time period, the majority of the available tanks (including re-armed Ausf. Es and Fs, plus new Ausf. G and H models) for the invading German military had the 50 mm (1.97 in) KwK 38 L/42 50mm cannon. Initially, the most numerous Soviet tanks the Germans encountered at the start of the invasion were older T-26 light infantry and BT class of cruiser tanks. This fact, together with superior German tactical and strategic skills in armoured clashes, sufficient quality crew training, and the generally-good ergonomics of the Panzer III, all contributed to a favourable kill-loss ratio of approximately 6:1 for German tanks of all types in 1941. However, the Panzer IIIs were significantly outclassed by the Soviet T-34 medium and KV series of heavy tanks, the former of which was gradually encountered in greater numbers by the German forces as the invasion progressed, although initial T-34 models suffered from their cramped two-man turret, weak optics and poor vision devices.

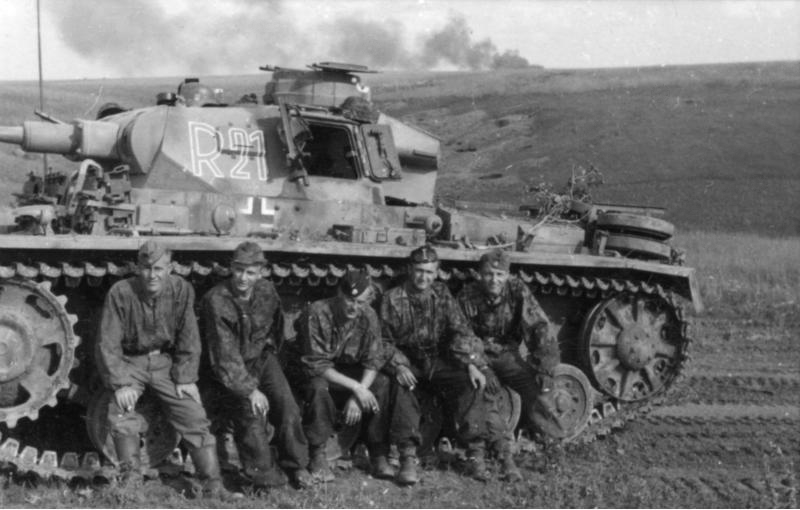
The crew of a Panzer III of the 2nd SS Panzer Division Das Reich rests during a lull in the Battle of Kursk on the Eastern Front.

With the appearance of the T-34 and KV-1/-2 tanks, rearming the Panzer III with a longer-barrelled and more powerful 50-millimetre (1.97 in) gun was prioritised. The T-34 was generally invulnerable in frontal combat engagements with the Panzer III until the 50 mm KwK 39 L/60 tank gun was introduced on the Panzer III Ausf. J beginning in the spring of 1942 (this tank gun was based on the infantry's 5 cm Pak 38 L/60 towed anti-tank gun). This could penetrate the T-34's heavy sloped armour frontally at ranges under 500 metres (1,600 ft). Against the KV class of heavy breakthrough tanks, the Panzer III was a significant threat if it was armed with special high-velocity tungsten-tipped armour-piercing (AP) rounds. In addition, to counter enemy anti-tank rifles, starting from 1943, the Ausf. L version began the use of spaced armour sideskirts and screens (known as Schürzen in German) around the turret and on the vulnerable hull-sides. However, due to the introduction of the upgunned and better armoured Panzer IV, the Panzer III was, after the German defeat at the Battle of Kursk in the summer of 1943, relegated to secondary/minor combat roles, such as tank-training, and it was finally replaced as the main German medium tank by the Panzer IV and the Panzer V Panther.

The Panzer III's durable chassis was the basis for the turretless Sturmgeschütz III assault gun/tank destroyer. It is proclaimed as one of the most strategically-advanced self-propelled guns of the war, as well as being the single most-produced German armoured fighting vehicle design of World War II.

By the end of the war in 1945, the Panzer III saw almost no frontline use, and many of them had been returned to the few remaining armaments/tank factories for conversion into ammunition carriers or recovery vehicles. A few other variants of the Panzer III were also experimented on and produced by German industries towards the last phases of the war, but few were mass-produced or even saw action against the encroaching enemy forces of the Americans, British and Soviets.

== Foreign users ==
In 1943, Turkey received 22 Panzer III Ausf. Ms, with Hitler hoping the country, militarily strengthened by Nazi Germany, could possibly threaten the Soviet Union from its southern border (in any case, neutral Turkey did not participate in any form of aggression towards the USSR or the Western Allies, and eventually declared war on Nazi Germany nearing the end of WWII instead, perhaps from Allied pressure). The Army of the Independent State of Croatia received 4 Ausf. N variants in the spring of 1944 and the Ustashe Militia received 20 other Ausf. Ns in the autumn of 1944. Romania received a number of Panzer III Ausf. Ns for its 1st Armored Division in 1943. They were called T-3 in the Romanian army. At least 2 of them were still operational in 1945.

Norway used leftover stocks of ex-German Panzer IIIs (along with similar Sturmgeschütz III assault guns/tank destroyers) abandoned by departing Nazi occupation forces at the end of WWII up until the 1950s. In the Soviet Union, the Panzer III was one of the more common captured Nazi tanks they operated, as with the Panzer IV. At least 200, together with some StuG IIIs, fell into Soviet hands following the German defeat at the Battle of Stalingrad. The Soviets decided to upgun these captured German vehicles and two resulting designs were produced: the SG-122 self-propelled howitzer and the SU-76i assault gun. The former was not well-designed and was only built in very small numbers, with most not seeing combat action at all, while the latter was regarded as a better option of a Panzer III-based assault vehicle with a larger 76 mm main gun. Aside from these locally designed Panzer III variants, the Soviets primarily tended to use them as their basic tank version, mainly used as second-line tanks, for reconnaissance and as mobile command posts.

The Japanese government bought two Panzer IIIs from their German allies during the war (one 50 mm and one 75 mm). Purportedly, this was for reverse engineering purposes, since Japan put more emphasis on the development of new military aircraft and naval technology and had been dependent on European influence in designing new tanks. By the time the vehicles were delivered, the Panzer III's technology was obsolete.

== Variants and production ==
Panzerkampfwagen III production - medium tanks
Ausführung	A	B	C	D	E	F	G	H	J	L	M	N
Year	1937	1937	1937/38	1938,1940	1939	1939-41	1940/41	1940/41	1941/42	1941/42	1942/43	1942/43
Produced	10	10	15	25 + 5	96	450	594	286	1521	1470	517	614

	Command tanks					Flame tank
Ausführung	D	E	H	J	K	Flamm
Year	1938/39	1939/40	1940/41	1941/42	1942/43	1943
Produced	30	45	175	81	50	100

- Panzer III Ausf. A - Prototype 15 ton vehicle; only 8 armed and saw service in Poland. Armed with 3.7 cm KwK 36 L/46.5 main gun and two coaxial 7.92 mm MG34 machine guns, and had a 250 PS HL 108 engine. Entered service in 1937 and taken out of service in 1940. It had a FuG 5 radio and a 360° hand-cranked turret.
- Panzer III Ausf. B - Prototype 15 ton vehicle; some saw service in Poland. Entered service in 1937 and put out of service in 1940. They were reused as a training vehicle after 1940. They had slightly thicker armour, and an eight-wheel suspension rather than the five-wheel suspension with coil springs.
- Panzer III Ausf. C - Prototype 16-ton vehicle; some saw service in Poland, but were put out of service soon after. Slightly different suspension, which used leaf springs, than previous models.
- Panzer III Ausf. D - Prototype; some saw service in Poland and Norway, but withdrawn from service soon after. Turret upgraded to 30 mm front, side and back. Hull armour remained the same. Hull rear was redesigned, and five vision slits added to the hull. Suspension slightly changed.
- Panzer III Ausf. E - Fifth version of the Panzer III with 30 mm (1.2 in) armour all-round, other than the rear of the vehicle, which increased the weight to 20 t (22 short tons). Suspension redesigned, switching from leaf-springs to torsion-bars, now using six larger roadwheels per side. Had a 300 PS HL 120 engine.
- Panzer III Ausf. F - improved Ausf. E, first mass-production version, late production armed with 5 cm KwK 38 L/42 main gun.
- Panzer III Ausf. G - Ausf F. with extra armour on the gun mantlet, late production armed with 5 cm KwK 38 L/42 main gun.
- Panzer III Ausf. H - 5 cm KwK 38 L/42 as standard gun. Bolt-on armour added to front and rear hull (30 mm base + 30 mm plates).
- Panzer III Ausf. I - A variant that was mentioned by Allied intelligence, but never existed. Possibly confused with the Ausf. J.
- Panzer III Ausf. J - The most common variant of the Panzer III, which served in North Africa and the Eastern Front. Hull and turret front armour increased to solid 50 mm plate. Spaced armour was placed around the gun mantlet. Some were produced with 5 cm KwK 39 L/60 gun and later redesignated Ausf. L.
- Panzer III Ausf. K - Panzerbefehlswagen command tank variant based on the Ausf. M with a modified turret. Carried actual main armament rather than a dummy gun as found on other Panzer III command versions.
- Panzer III Ausf. L - Redesignated Ausf. J equipped with long 5 cm gun, 20 mm stand-off armour plates on hull and turret front. It was also equipped with a new system for transferring heated engine coolant to another vehicle.
- Panzer III Ausf. M - Minor modifications of the ausf. L such as deep-wading exhaust and Schürzen side-armour panels.
- Panzer III Ausf. N - Infantry support tank, armed with a short-barrelled 7.5 cm KwK 37 L/24 gun. 700 were produced or re-equipped from 1942 and 1943.
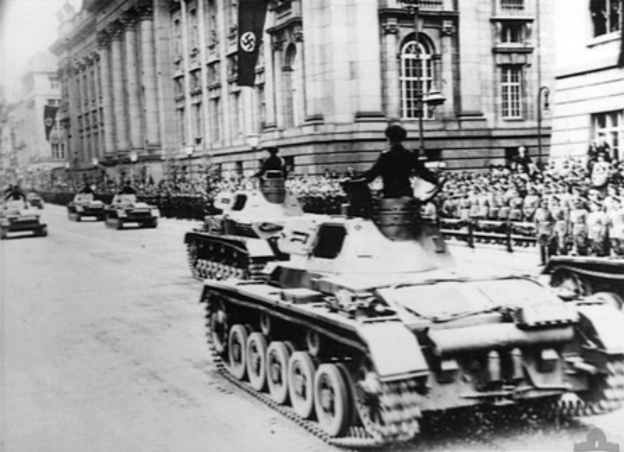
Panzer III Ausf. A on parade (1938)

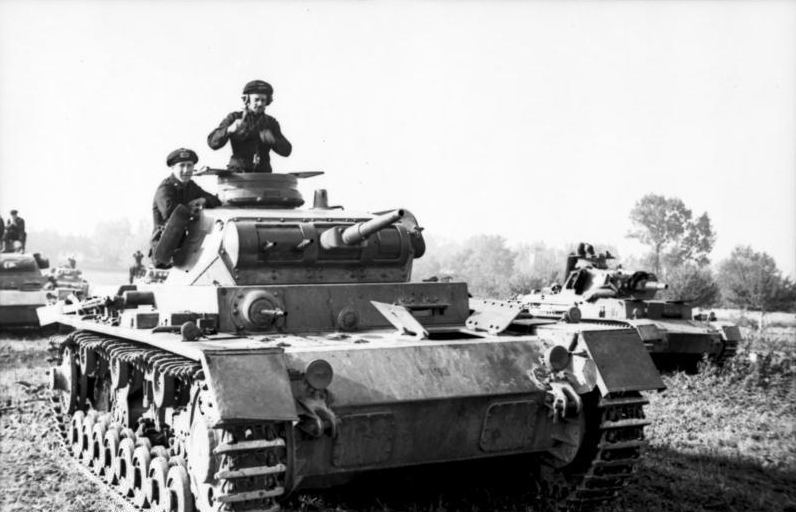
Ausf. D, Poland (1939)

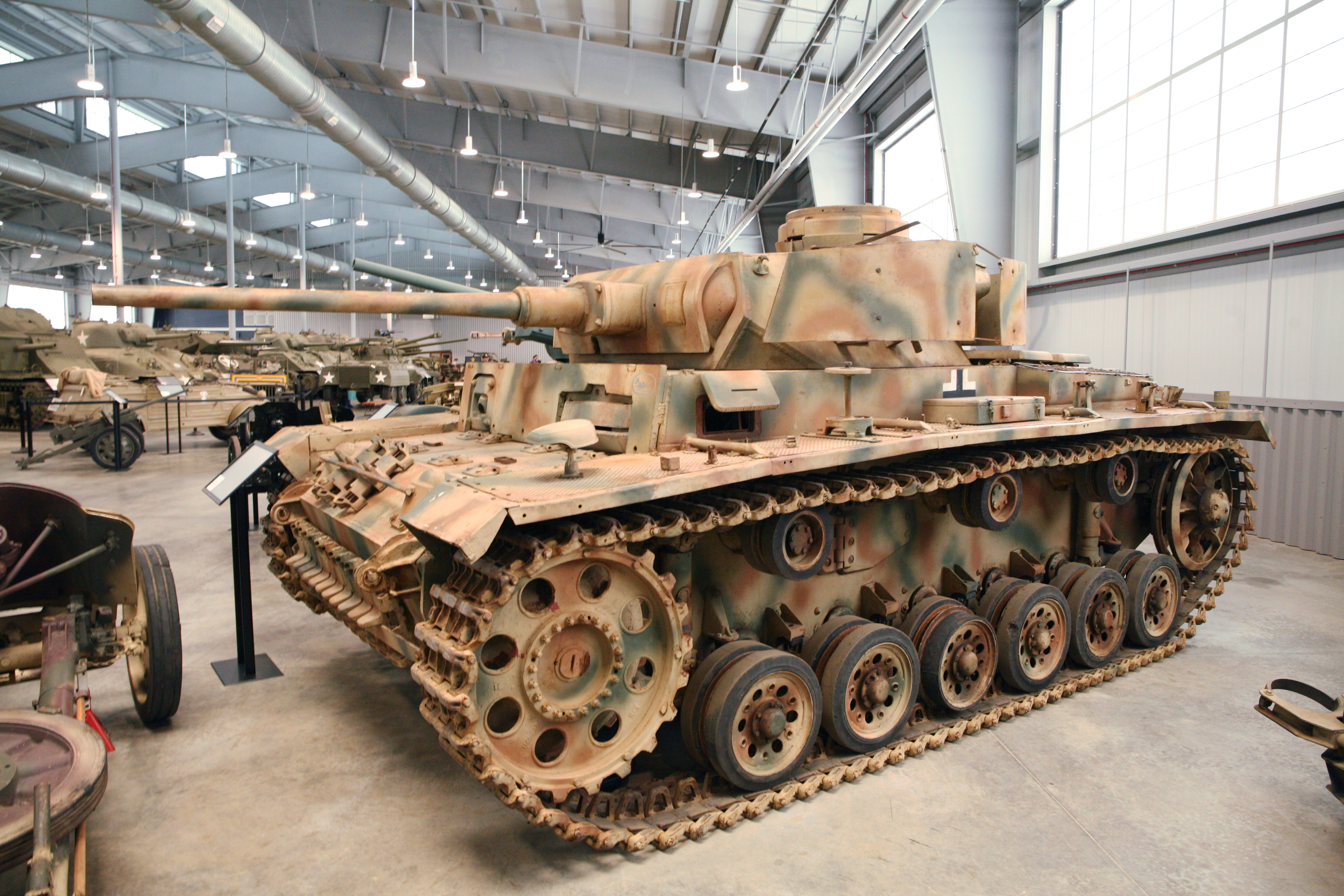
Ausf. F, U.S. Army Armor and Cavalry Collection

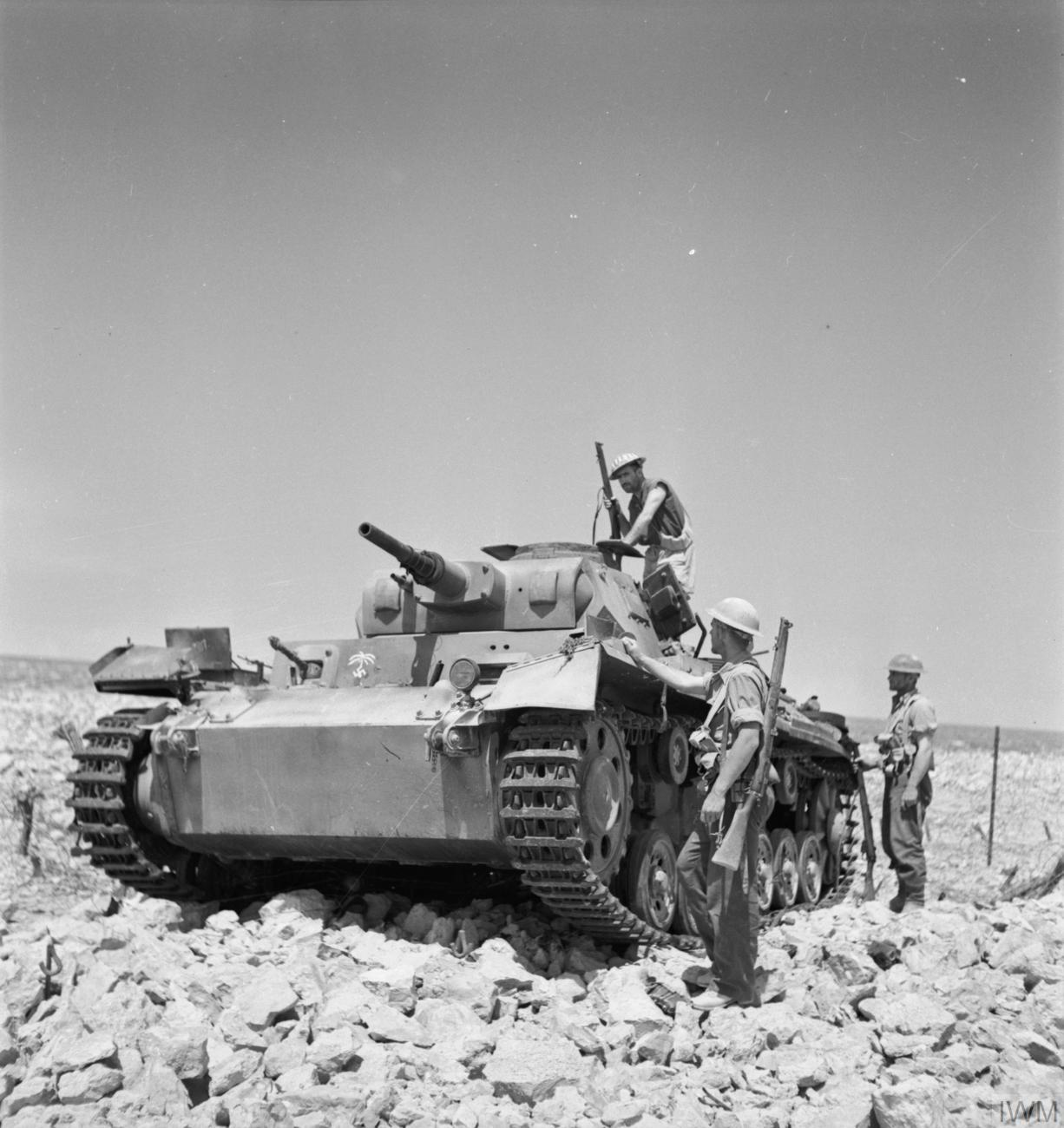
Ausf.G, captured by the British in North Africa (1941).

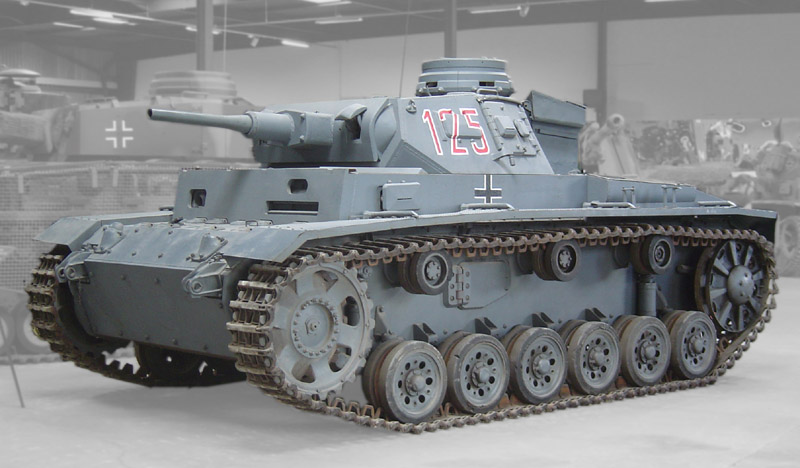
Ausf. H in the Musée des Blindés, Saumur.

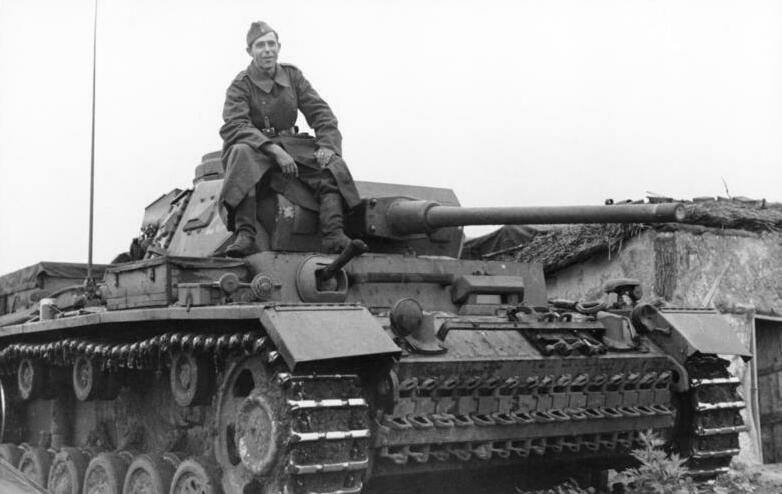
Ausf. J, USSR (1942).

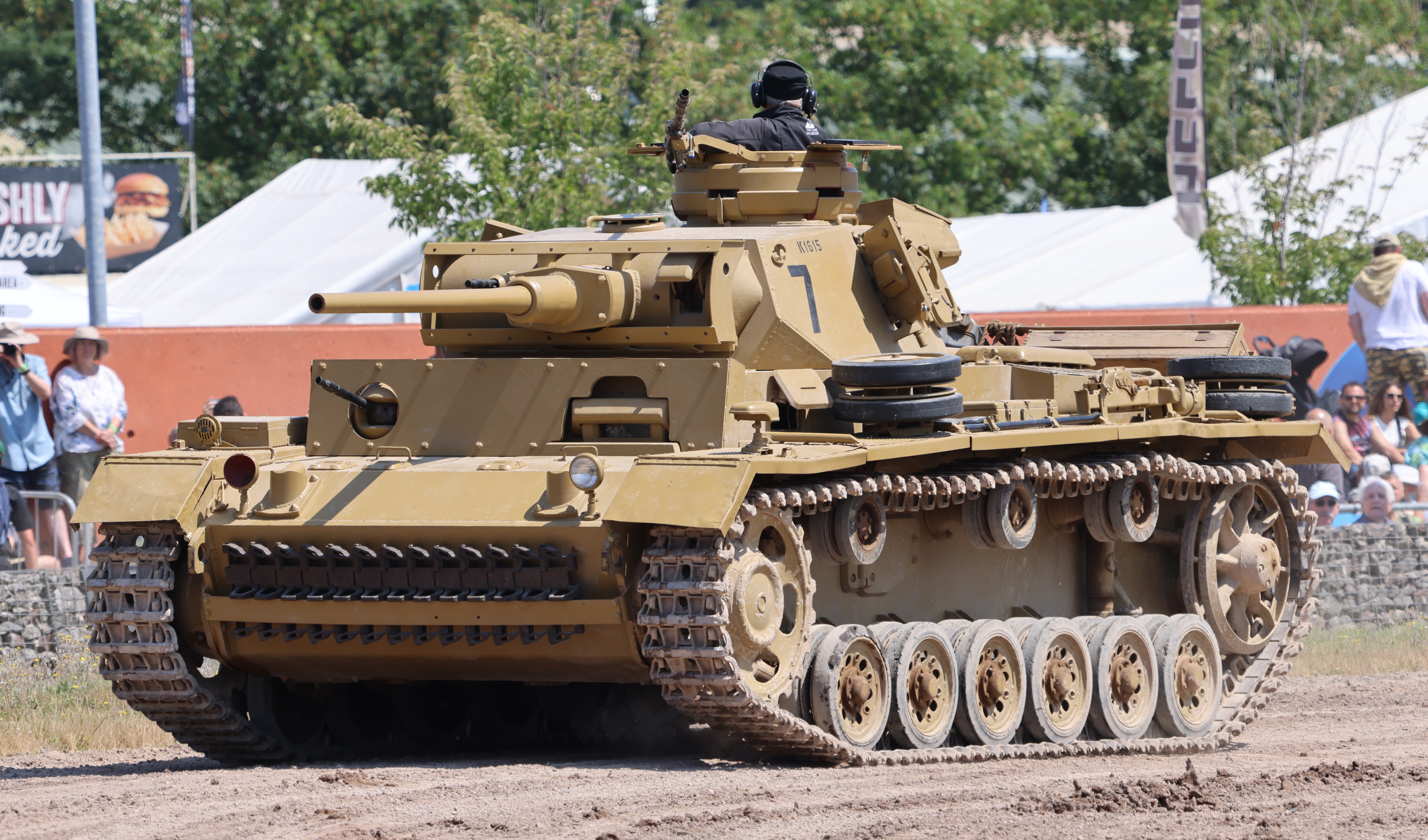
Ausf. L, The Tank Museum (2023)

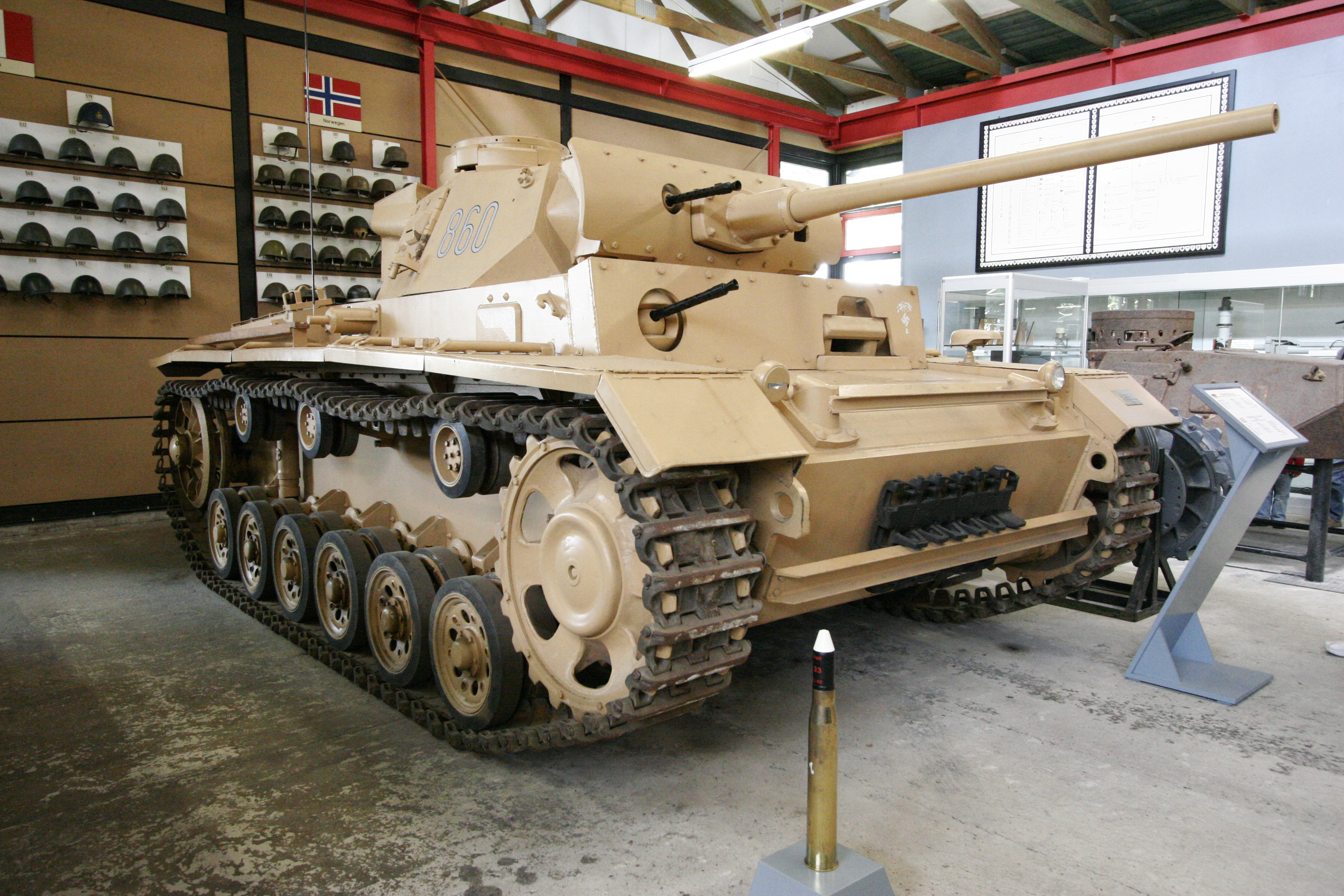
Ausf. M, Deutsches Panzermuseum (2005)

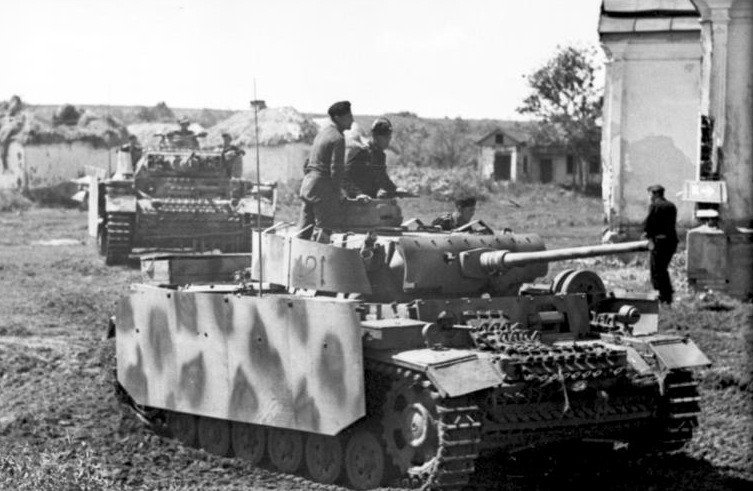
Ausf. M with side skirts in southern USSR (1943)

== Designs based on chassis ==
- Panzerbeobachtungswagen III - Forward artillery observer tank. 262 converted from older Panzer III Ausf. E to H variants.
- Bergepanzer III - In 1944, 176 Panzer IIIs were converted to armoured recovery vehicles (ARVs). Mostly issued to formations with Tiger I heavy tanks.
- Flammpanzer III Ausf. M / Panzer III (Fl) - Flamethrower tank. 100 built on new Ausf. M chassis.
- Panzerbefehlswagen III - Command tank with long-range radios. Ausf. D, E and H: variants with dummy main guns; Ausf. J and K: types armed with actual 5 cm gun.
- Sturm-Infanteriegeschütz 33B' - An infantry close-support heavy assault gun. Armed with a 15 cm sIG 33 infantry gun, total of 24 built. 12 used and lost in Stalingrad.
- Sturmgeschütz III - Assault gun/tank destroyer armed with a 75 mm (2.95 in) gun. Was the most produced German armored fighting vehicle during World War II.
- Sturmhaubitze 42 - Was an assault howitzer with thicker frontal armor and Schürzen that was armed with a modified variant of the 10.5 cm leFH 18 howitzer, that was electrically fired and fitted with a muzzle brake. Alkett produced 1,299 StuH 42 from March 1943 to 1945.
- The Soviet SU-76i assault gun was based on the chassis of captured German Panzer IIIs and StuG IIIs after the Battle of Stalingrad in 1943. About 201 of these vehicles, many taken from Stalingrad itself, were converted at Factory No. 37 in Sverdlovsk that same year for Red Army service by removing the turret and constructing a fixed casemate in its place, installing a 76.2-millimetre (3.00 in) S-1 tank gun (a cheaper version of the F-34 on the T-34 tank) in a limited-traverse gun mount. The armour was 35 millimetres (1.38 in) thick on the casemate front, 50 millimetres (1.97 in) in the hull front, and 30 millimetres (1.18 in) on the hull sides. It was issued to tank and self-propelled gun units starting in the fall of 1943, and finally withdrawn to training and testing uses in early 1944. Two SU-76is survive: one on a monument in the Ukrainian town of Sarny and a second on display in a military museum on Poklonnaya Hill in Moscow. It should not be confused with the similarly-named Soviet SU-76 assault gun series.
- Tauchpanzer III - (Dive-tank III) Some tanks were converted to amphibious tanks for Operation Sea Lion. Unusually, they were designed to be able to stay underwater rather than to float like most other similar kinds of tanks. The idea was that they would be launched near to the invasion shoreline and then drive to dry land on the sea-bottom. The tank was totally waterproofed, the exhaust was fitted with a one-way valve and air intake for the engine and the crew compartment was through a hose.
- Munitionspanzer III - Some Panzer IIIs were converted into munitions carriers/tractors from obsolete Mk III hulls, simply by removing the turret. Several examples have been photoed supplying Tiger tank units.
- Flakpanzer III - Made using Ostwind turrets and a single 3.7 cm Flak 43. 18 production vehicles plus 2 prototypes built by Deutsche-Röhrenwerke as requested by Inspectorate 4 - Artillery Division.
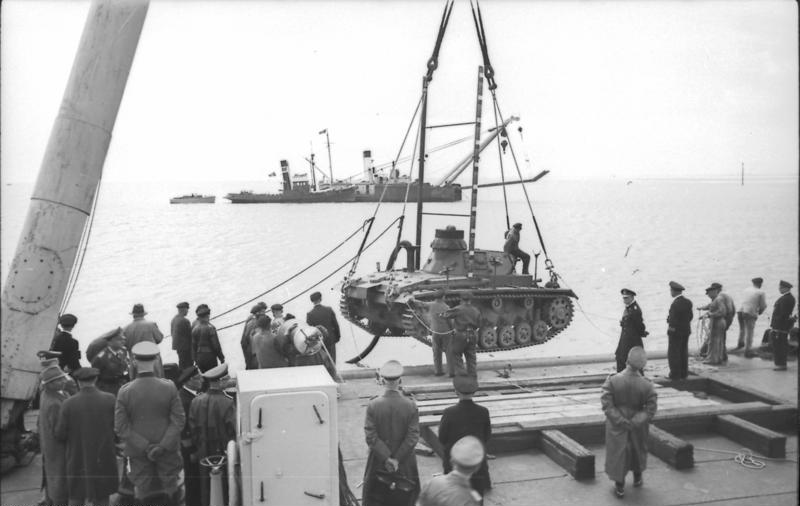
A Tauchpanzer III undergoing testing at sea. The crane ship Viper, which was to support Tauchpanzer operations, is in the distance.

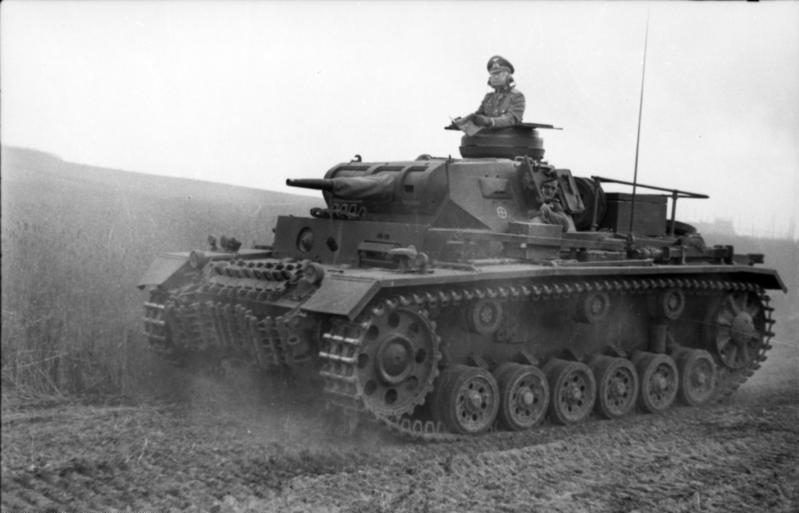
An early-variant Panzerbefehlswagen somewhere in the Balkans in 1941.

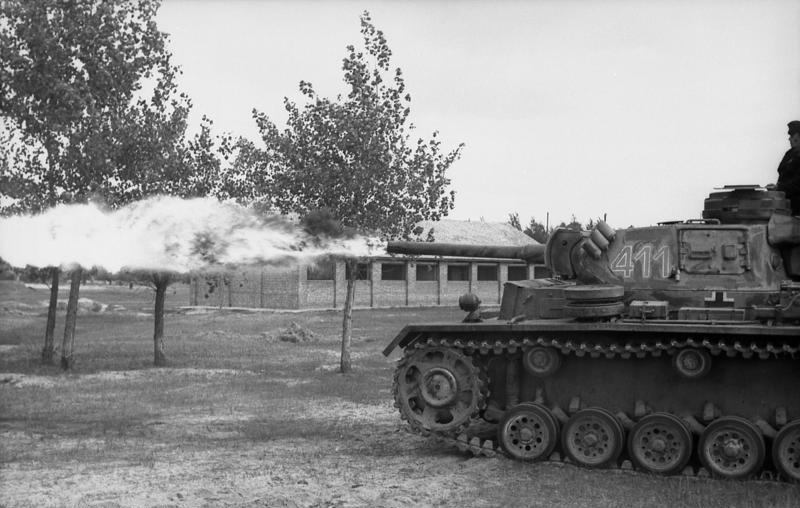
A Flammpanzer III, possibly during testing.

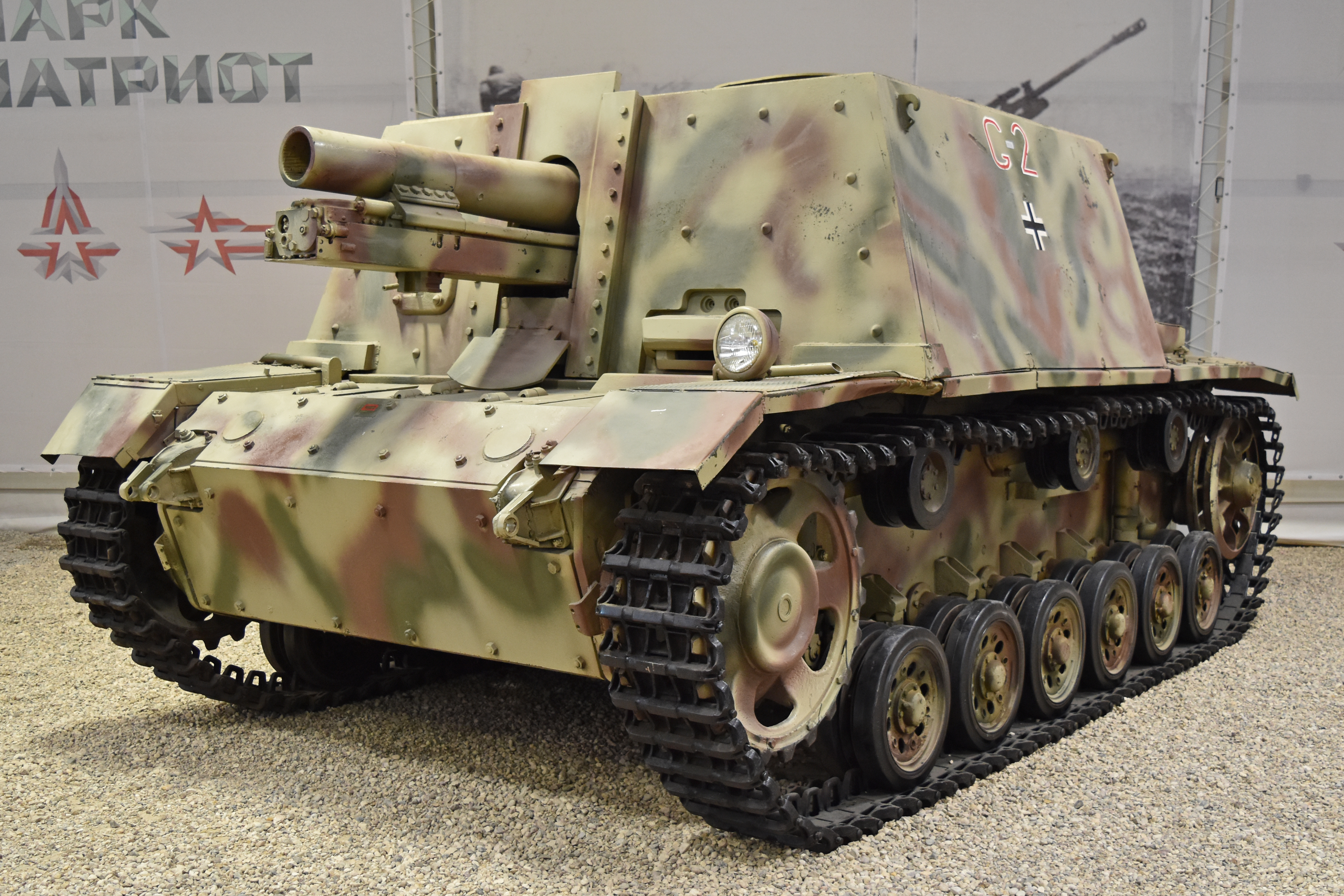
StuIG 33B at the Kubinka tank museum.

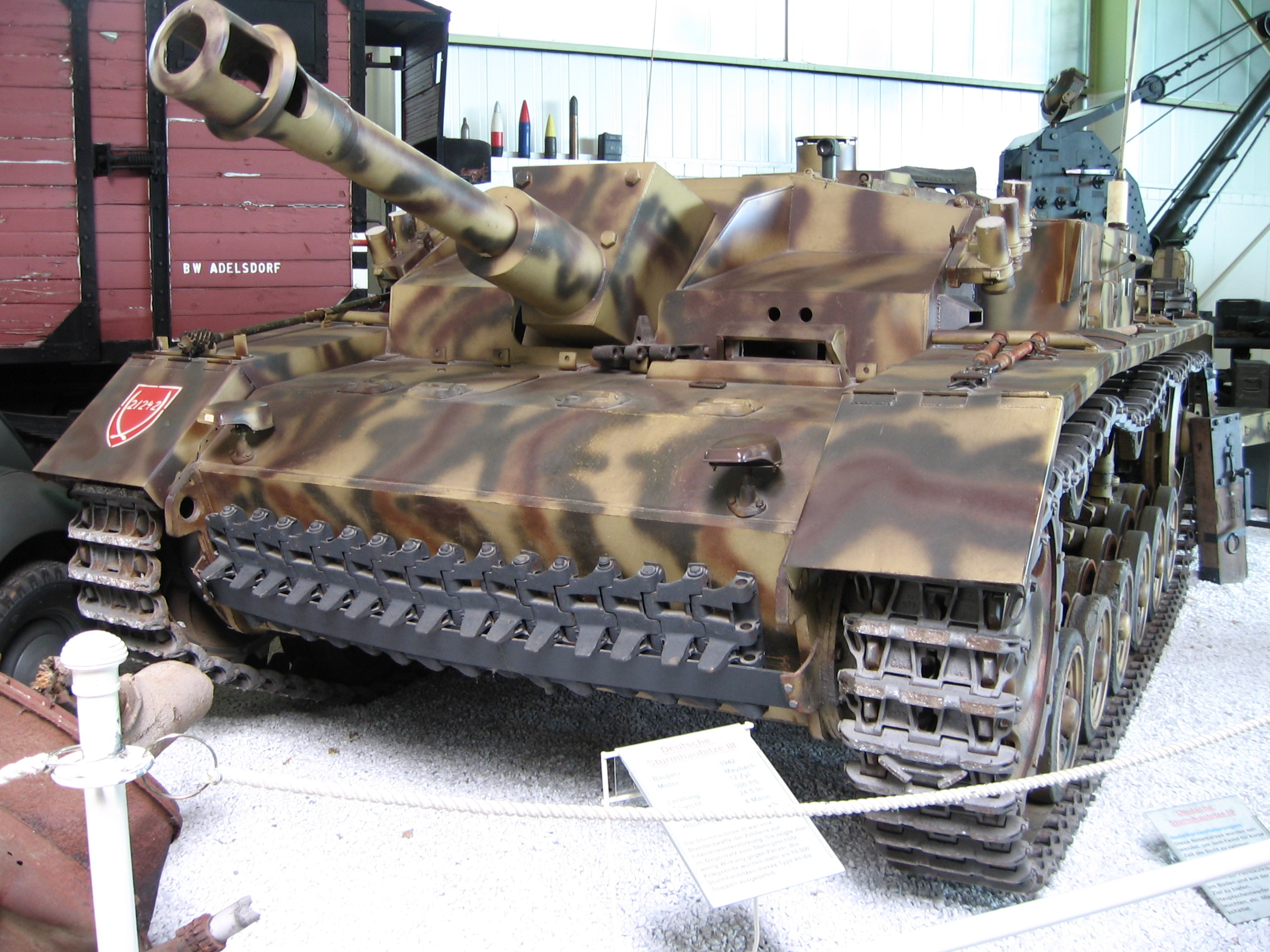
Sturmhaubitze 42 in the Auto und Technik Museum Sinsheim.

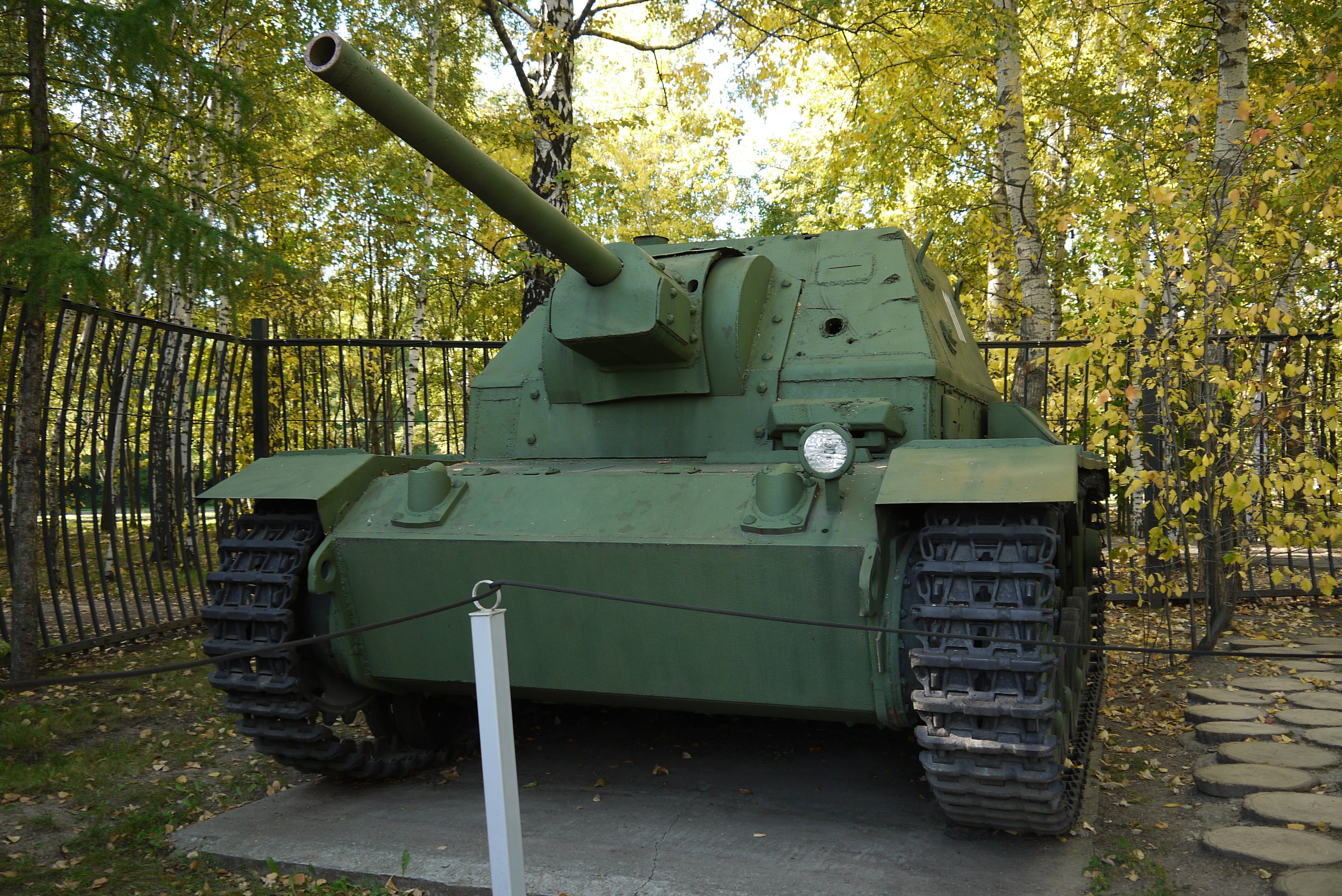
An SU-76i displayed at the Museum of the Great Patriotic War on Poklonnaya Hill Victory Park in Moscow, Russia.

== See also ==
- Panzer III/IV
- Sturmgeschütz III

Tanks of comparable role, performance and era

- Valentine tank : British equivalent
- M3 Lee : American equivalent
- T-34 : Soviet equivalent medium tank
