= 7.5 cm KwK 37 =

German tank gun

7.5 cm KwK 37 (L/24)
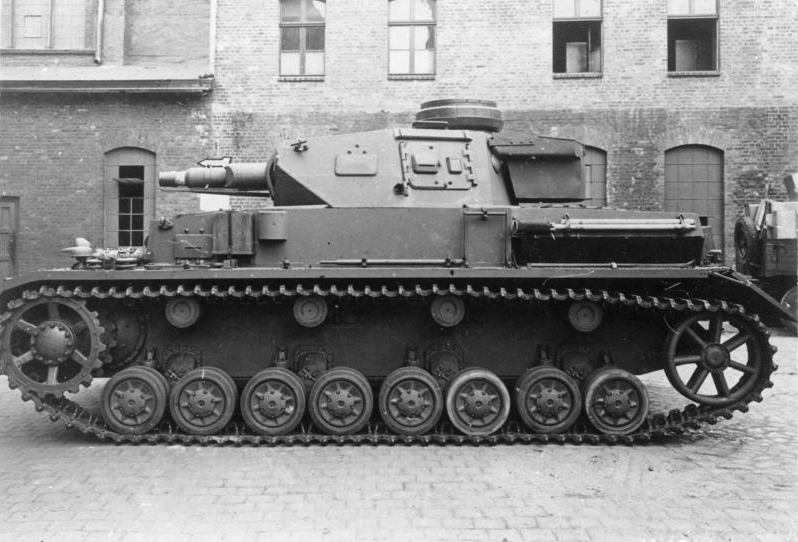
- Panzer IV with 7.5cm KwK 37 L/24
- Type: Kampfwagenkanone
- Place of origin: Germany

Service history
- In service: 1937–1945
- Used by: Nazi Germany
- Wars: World War II

Production history
- Designer: Krupp
- Designed: 1934
- Manufacturer: Krupp
- Unit cost: 8000 RM
- Produced: 1934-1945

Specifications
- Mass: 490 kg (1,080.3 lb)
- Barrel length: 176.25 cm (69.39 in) bore (23.5 calibers)
- Shell: Fixed QF 75×243mm R
- Caliber: 75 mm (2.95 in)
- Elevation: -10° to +20°
- Rate of fire: 12–15 round per minute
- Muzzle velocity: 385 m/s (1,260 ft/s)
- Maximum firing range: 6,200 m (20,341 ft)

The 7.5 cm KwK 37 L/24 (7.5 cm Kampfwagenkanone 37 L/24) was a short-barreled, howitzer-like German 75 mm tank gun used during World War II, primarily as the main armament of the early Panzer IV tank. Slightly modified as StuK 37, it was also mounted in early StuG III assault guns and Sd.Kfz. 251/9 armored personnel carriers.

It was designed as a close-support infantry gun firing a high-explosive shell (hence the relatively short barrel) but was also effective against the tanks it faced early in the war. From March 1942, new variants of the Panzer IV and StuG III had a derivative of the 7.5 cm PaK 40 anti-tank gun, the longer-barreled 7.5 cm KwK 40. When older Panzer IVs were up-gunned, their former KwK 37 guns were reused to arm later Panzer III tanks and other infantry support vehicles. In 1943, depleted stocks and demand for the Panzer III Ausf. N required restarting production of a slightly revised 7.5 cm K 51 L/24 (7.5 cm Kanone 51 L/24).

== Ammunition ==
The KwK 37 used 75×243 mmR caliber cases.

- Kt. Kw. K. - Canister
- Nbgr. Kw. K. - Smoke
- Gr.38 Hl - High explosive anti-tank
- Gr.38 Hl/A - High explosive anti-tank
- Gr.38 Hl/B - High explosive anti-tank
- Gr.38 Hl/C - High explosive anti-tank

7.5 cm Sprgr.34 - high explosive

- Projectile weight: 12.6 lb (5.7 kg)
- Explosive weight: 1.875 lb (0.850 kg) (2080 Kilojoules)

K.Gr.rot.Pz. - Armour-piercing

- Projectile weight: 6.80 kg (15.0 lb)
- Muzzle velocity: 385 m/s (1,260 ft/s)

Penetration figures
Range	Penetration	Hit probability (%)
100 m (330 ft)	41 mm (1.6 in)	100
500 m (1,600 ft)	39 mm (1.5 in)	100
1,000 m (3,300 ft)	35 mm (1.4 in)	97
1,200 m (3,900 ft)	33 mm (1.3 in)	82

Pzgr 39. - Armour-piercing

- Projectile weight: 6.80 kg (15.0 lb)
- Muzzle velocity: 385 m/s (1,260 ft/s)

Penetration figures given for an armoured plate 30 degrees from vertical
Range	Penetration	Hit probability (%)
100 m (330 ft)	41 mm (1.6 in)	100
500 m (1,600 ft)	39 mm (1.5 in)	100
1,000 m (3,300 ft)	35 mm (1.4 in)	97
1,500 m (4,900 ft)	33 mm (1.3 in)	82
2,000 m (6,600 ft)	30 mm (1.2 in)	NA

== Penetration comparison ==
Calculated penetration figures (90 degrees impact) (Note: uses American and British 50% success criteria)
Ammunition type	Muzzle velocity	Distance									
Ammunition type	Muzzle velocity	100 m (110 yd)	250 m (270 yd)	500 m (550 yd)	750 m (820 yd)	1,000 m (1,100 yd)	1,250 m (1,370 yd)	1,500 m (1,600 yd)	2,000 m (2,200 yd)	2,500 m (2,700 yd)	3,000 m (3,300 yd)
Pzgr. 39/1 (APCBC)	385 m/s (1,260 ft/s)	54 mm (2.1 in)	53 mm (2.1 in)	50 mm (2.0 in)	48 mm (1.9 in)	46 mm (1.8 in)	44 mm (1.7 in)	42 mm (1.7 in)	38 mm (1.5 in)	35 mm	32 mm (1.3 in)
Pzgr. 39/2 (APCBC)	385 m/s (1,260 ft/s)	60 mm (2.4 in)	58 mm (2.3 in)	55 mm (2.2 in)	52 mm (2.0 in)	50 mm	47 mm (1.9 in)	44 mm	38 mm	33 mm	27 mm (1.1 in)
Gr.38 Hl (HEAT)	450 m/s (1,500 ft/s)	52 mm (2.0 in)									
Gr.38 Hl/A (HEAT)	450 m/s (1,500 ft/s)	81 mm (3.2 in)									
Gr.38 Hl/B (HEAT)	450 m/s (1,500 ft/s)	87 mm (3.4 in)									
Gr.38 Hl/C (HEAT)	450 m/s (1,500 ft/s)	115 mm (4.5 in)									

== Applications ==
7.5 cm KwK 37 / 7.5 cm K 37

- Neubaufahrzeug
- Panzer III Ausf. N
- Panzer IV Ausf. A to F1
- StuG III Ausf. A to E
- Sd.Kfz. 233 Schwerer Panzerspähwagen
- Sd.Kfz. 251/9 Schützenpanzerwagen

7.5 cm K 51

- Sd.Kfz. 234/3 Schwerer Panzerspähwagen
- Sd.Kfz. 250/8 Schützenpanzerwagen
- Sd.Kfz. 251/9 Schützenpanzerwagen (Late-production Ausf. D)

== See also ==
- Howitzer motor carriage M8, armed with 75mm American M2 or M3 howitzer
