= Sd.Kfz. 251 =

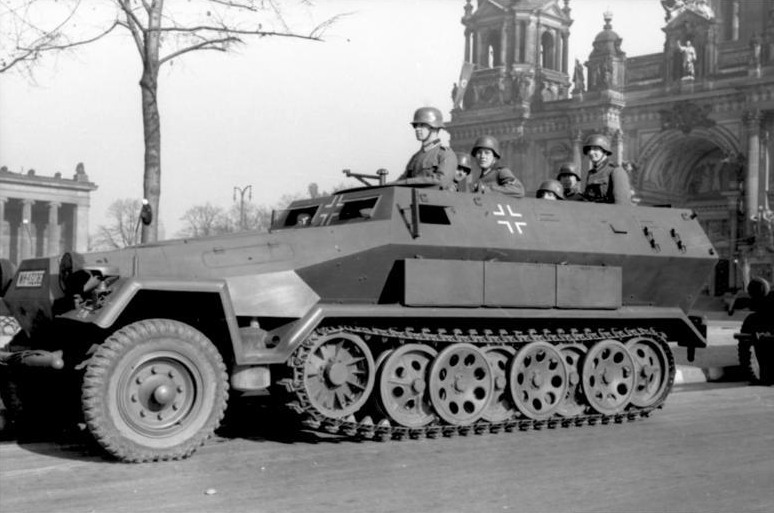
- Sd.Kfz. 251/1 Ausf. A armoured personnel carrier. Unter den Linden, Berlin, 1 January 1940
- Type: Half-track armoured personnel carrier
- Place of origin: Nazi Germany

Service history
- In service: 1939–1945
- Used by: Nazi Germany; Kingdom of Romania; Kingdom of Hungary; Italian Social Republic; French Army; Independent State of Croatia; Czechoslovak Army; Yugoslav People's Army
- Wars: World War II

Production history
- Designer: Hanomag
- Designed: 1937–1938
- Manufacturer: Hanomag, Adlerwerke, Horch, Škoda, Borgward
- Unit cost: 22,560 ℛ︁ℳ︁
- No. built: Approx. 15,252

Specifications
- Mass: 7.81 tonnes (8.61 short tons)
- Length: 5.80 metres (19 ft 0 in)
- Width: 2.10 metres (6 ft 11 in)
- Height: 1.75 metres (5 ft 9 in)
- Crew: 2 crew+10 passengers
- Armor: 6–14.5 millimetres (0.24–0.57 in)
- Main armament: MG 34/42
- Engine: one Maybach HL42 6-cylinder petrol engine 100 metric horsepower (99 hp)
- Power/weight: 12.8 hp/tonne
- Suspension: Overlapping torsion bar (track); Leaf spring (wheels)
- Operational range: 300 kilometres (190 mi)
- Maximum speed: 52.5 kilometres per hour (32.6 mph)

The Sd.Kfz. 251 (Sonderkraftfahrzeug 251) was a World War II German half-tracked armoured personnel carrier. Designed by the Hanomag company to transport the Panzergrenadier (German mechanized infantry) into battle, the Sd.Kfz. 251 was based on its earlier unarmored Sd.Kfz. 11 vehicle. Sd.Kfz. 251s were the most widely produced German half-tracks of the war, with at least 15,252 vehicles and variants produced by seven manufacturers. The utility of this vehicle led the German Army to develop the similar looking but shorter and lighter Sd.Kfz. 250 as a supplement.

Some sources state that the Sd.Kfz. 251 was commonly referred to simply as "Hanomags" by both German and Allied soldiers after the manufacturer of the vehicle; this has been questioned, and may have been only a postwar label. German officers referred to them as SPW (Schützenpanzerwagen, or armored infantry vehicle) in their daily orders and memoirs.

== Design ==
There were four main model modifications to the Sd.Kfz. 251 (Ausführung A through D), which formed the basis for at least 22 variants. The initial idea was for a vehicle that could be used to transport a single squad of 10 panzergrenadiers to the battlefield protected from enemy small arms fire, and with some protection from artillery fire. In addition, the standard mounting of at least one MG 34 or MG 42 machine gun allowed the vehicle to provide suppressive fire for the rifle squad both while they dismounted and in combat.

The troop compartment was protected by armor on its sides, but open on top. The armour plates were designed to provide protection against standard rifle/ machine gun bullets (such as the 7.92×57mm Mauser). The front-facing plates were 14.5 mm thick; the sides were V-shaped 8 mm thick plates, steeply angled to increase their effective protection against horizontal fire. This level of armour provided protection against normal (non-tungsten) armor-piercing (AP) rifle rounds, which could pierce about 8 mm of vertical armour.

Positive aspects of the open top included greater situational awareness and faster egress by the infantry, as well as the ability to throw grenades and fire over the top of the fighting compartment as necessary while remaining under good horizontal cover. The downside, as with all armored personnel carriers of the era, was a major vulnerability to all types of plunging fire; this included indirect fire from mortars and field artillery, as well as small arms fire from higher elevated positions, hand grenades, Molotov cocktails, and strafing by enemy aircraft.

The first two models (Ausf. A and B) were produced in small numbers from 1939. Ausf. A and B models can be identified by the structure of the nose armor, which comprised two trapezoidal armor panels - the lower of which had an engine cooling vent. The B model, which began production in 1940, eliminated the fighting compartment's side vision slits. The C model, which started production in mid-1942, featured a simplified hexagonal-shaped forward armored plate for the engine. Models A through C had rear doors that bulged out. The C model had a large production run, but was quite complex to build, involving many angled plates. From early 1943, the D model was developed with the purpose of halving the number of angled body plates, simplifying the design and thus speeding up the production. D models can be easily recognized by their single piece sloping rear, with flat doors, and was the most produced variant, with 10,602 units manufactured.

The standard personnel carrier version was equipped with a 7.92 mm MG 34 or MG 42 machine gun mounted at the front of the open compartment, above and behind the driver. A second machine gun could be mounted at the rear on an anti-aircraft mount.

Variants were produced for specialized purposes, including with anti-aircraft guns, light howitzers, anti-tank guns and mortars or even large unguided artillery rockets, as well as a version with an infrared search light used to spot potential targets for associated Panther tanks equipped with infrared detectors.

A strong design feature of the Sd.Kfz. 251 was the large track area, with the characteristic "slack track" design with no return rollers for the upper run of track. The Sd.Kfz. 251 also had the Schachtellaufwerk system of overlapping and interleaved main road wheels common to virtually all German halftracks of the period. This lowered the ground pressure and provided better traction, at the cost of much greater complexity in maintenance. The Sd.Kfz. 251 had a combination of front wheel and tank steering, where normal steering engaged track braking as increased turning power was required.

As with the Tiger I and Panther tanks that shared interleaved and overlapping main road wheels, accumulated mud and snow could clog or freeze solid between them in muddy or winter weather conditions, such as those during a Russian rasputitsa mud season, immobilizing the vehicle.

Annual production started slowly and remained below 1,000 Sd.Kfz. 251 per year until 1941. In 1942, 1,190 Sd.Kfz. 251 were produced, while in 1943 the figure rose to 4,250 and in 1944 to 7,800. A total of at least 15,252 vehicles of all versions and variants were built.

== Use ==
The early production models of this vehicle were issued to the 1st Panzer Division in 1939 as the 'Ausf.A' or 'A-version'. There were 232 estimated Ausf.A units produced, which took place in Hannover's Hanomag, Büssing-NAG of Berlin-Oberschöneweide, Weserhütte of Bad Oeynhausen, Wumag of Görlitz, and F. Schichau shipyard of Elbing facilities.

These vehicles were meant to enable Panzergrenadiers to accompany panzers and provide infantry support as required. In practice, there were never enough of them to go around, and most Panzergrenadier units had to make do with trucks for transport.

More units of the Sd.Kfz. were used during the German invasion of the Benelux (Belgium, Netherlands and Luxembourg) in 10th May, 1940 and generally in the Battle of France (mainly on the Ardennes, where the Germans used to move inside of the Allied defense lines multiple divisions).

It saw action in limited use in the North African campaign, as only two Panzer divisions were involved in the campaign. It also saw action in the Balkans, Greece, and the Soviet Union by summer 1941.

In August 1943, Romania acquired a total of 27 armored half-tracks, of both the 251 and 250 types followed in 1944 by 251 type and other types of armored cars to convert two cavalry divisions into armored or mechanized divisions. Sd.Kfz. 251s were known as SPW mijlociu ("medium SPW") in Romanian service, while Sd.Kfz. 250s were referred to as SPW ușor ("light SPW").

The Army of the Independent State of Croatia received 15 Sd.Kfz. 251 in spring 1944 and the Ustashe Militia received 12 in autumn 1944.

== Variants ==
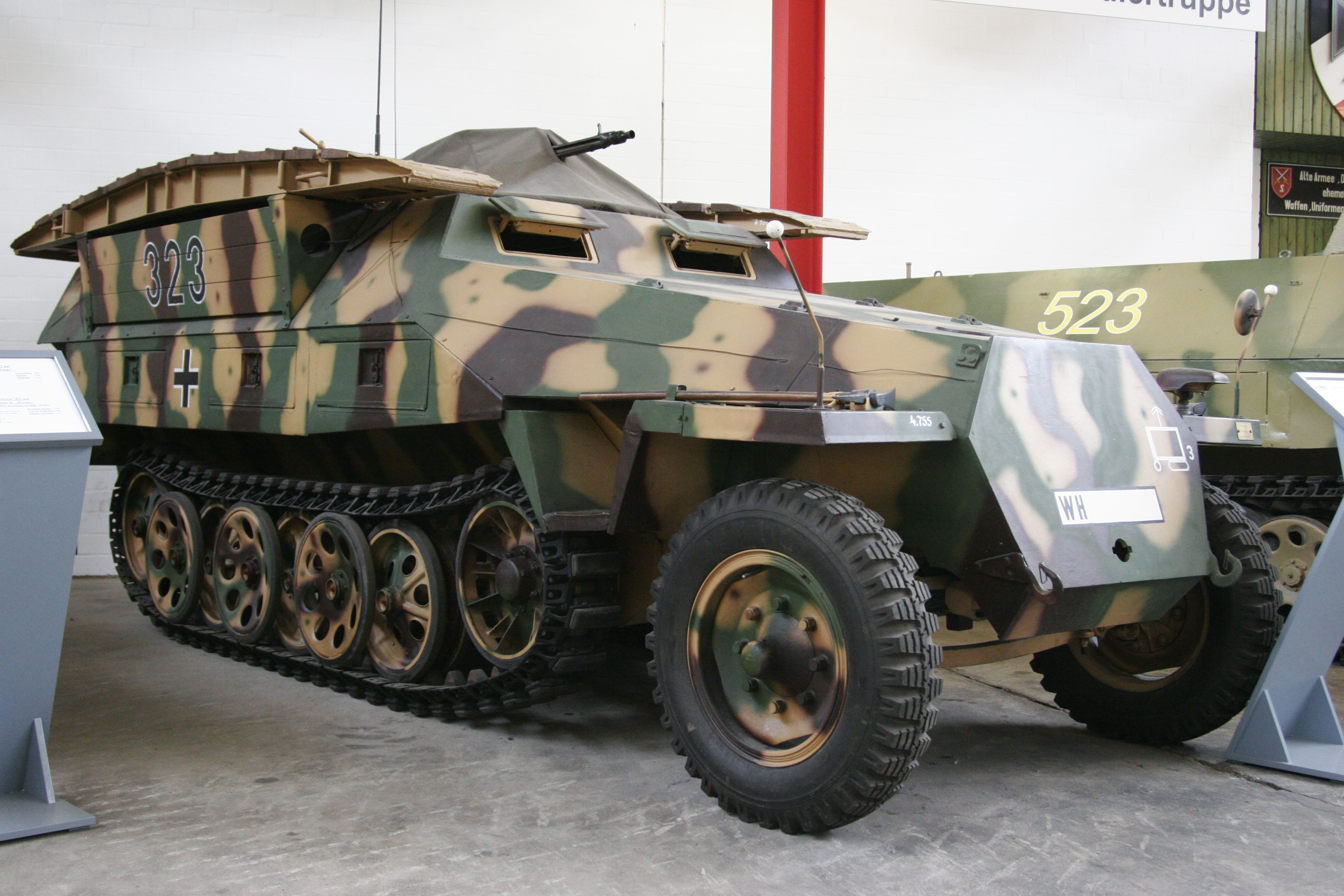
Sd.Kfz. 251/7 "Pionierpanzerwagen"

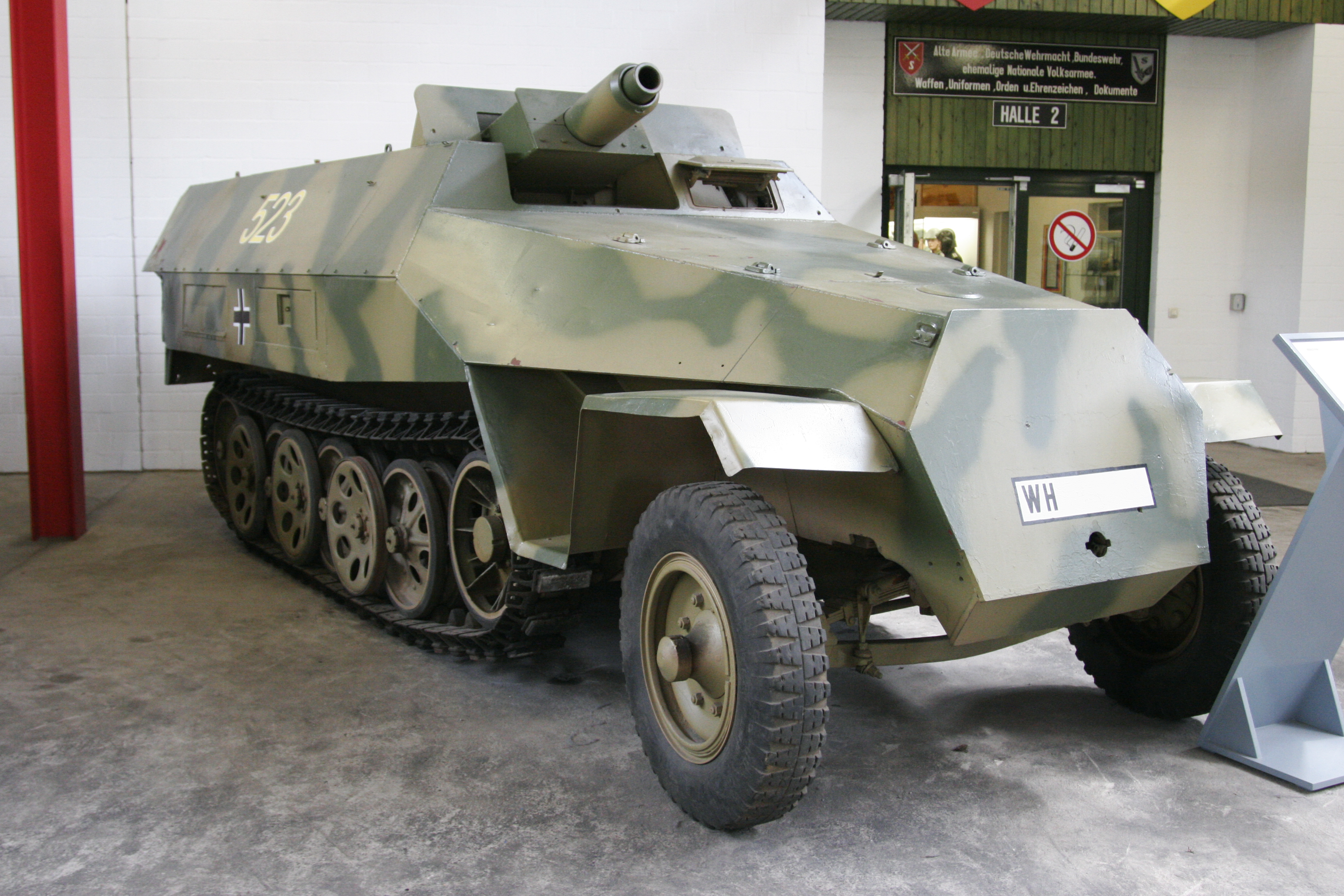
Sd.Kfz. 251/9 "Stummel"

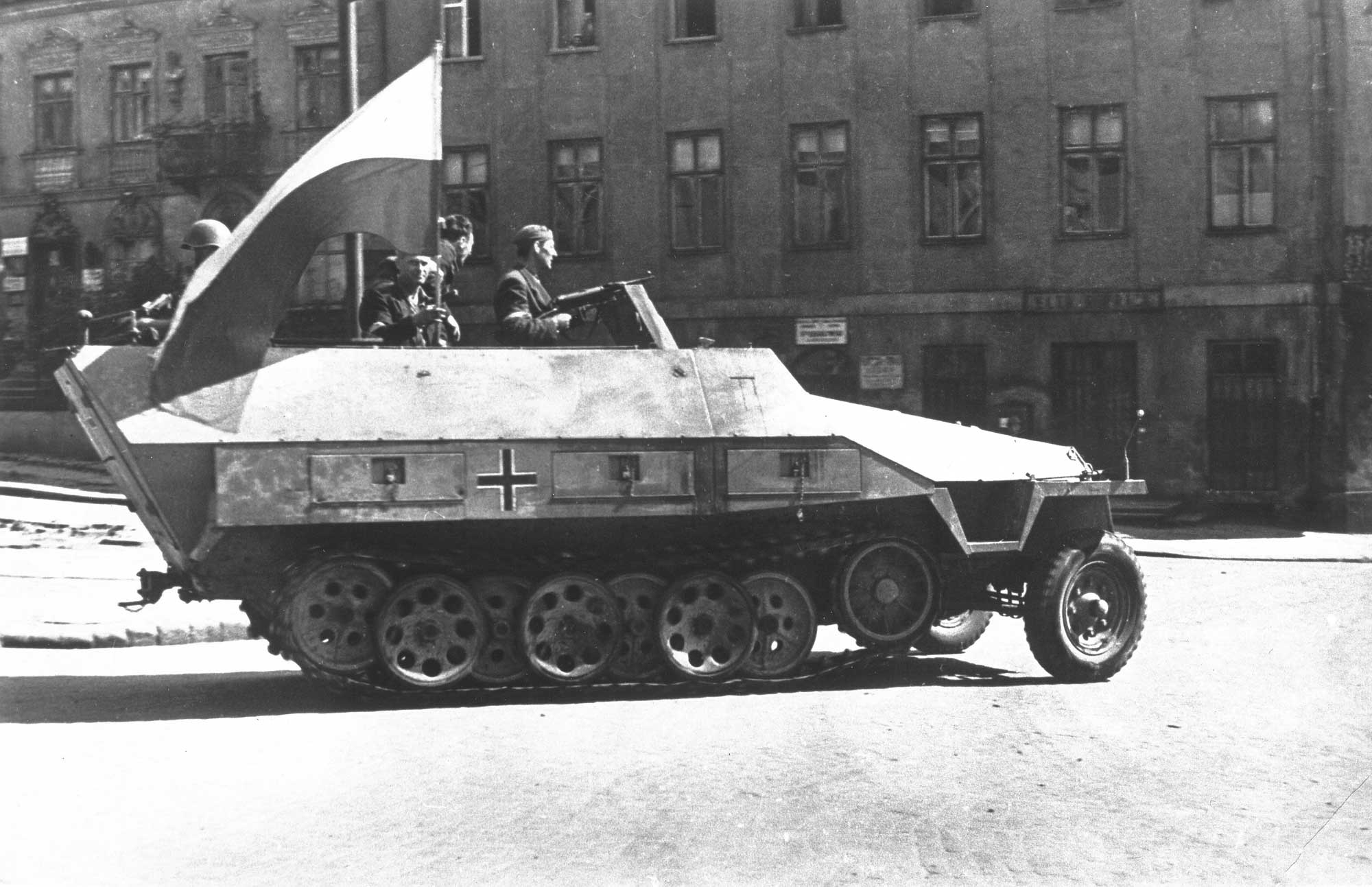
Sd.Kfz. 251/1 Ausf.D captured by the Polish Home Army during the Warsaw Uprising in 1944

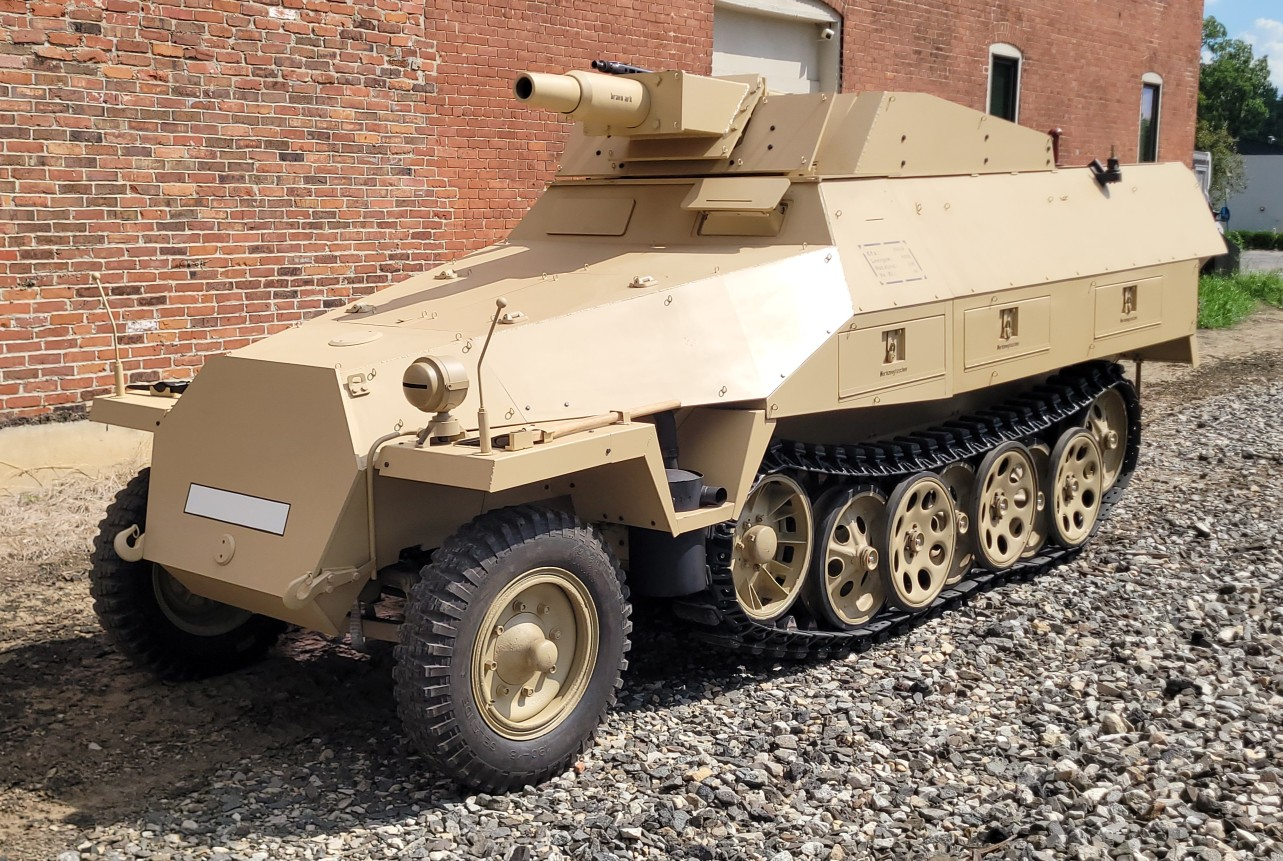
Sd.Kfz. 251/9 Ausf. D "Stummel". Built by Auto Union, with factory number 543019, this specific vehicle was restored to factory specs in 2025. Though there is another model located at Fort Benning, this specific half track represents the only running and complete vehicle of its type known to exist.

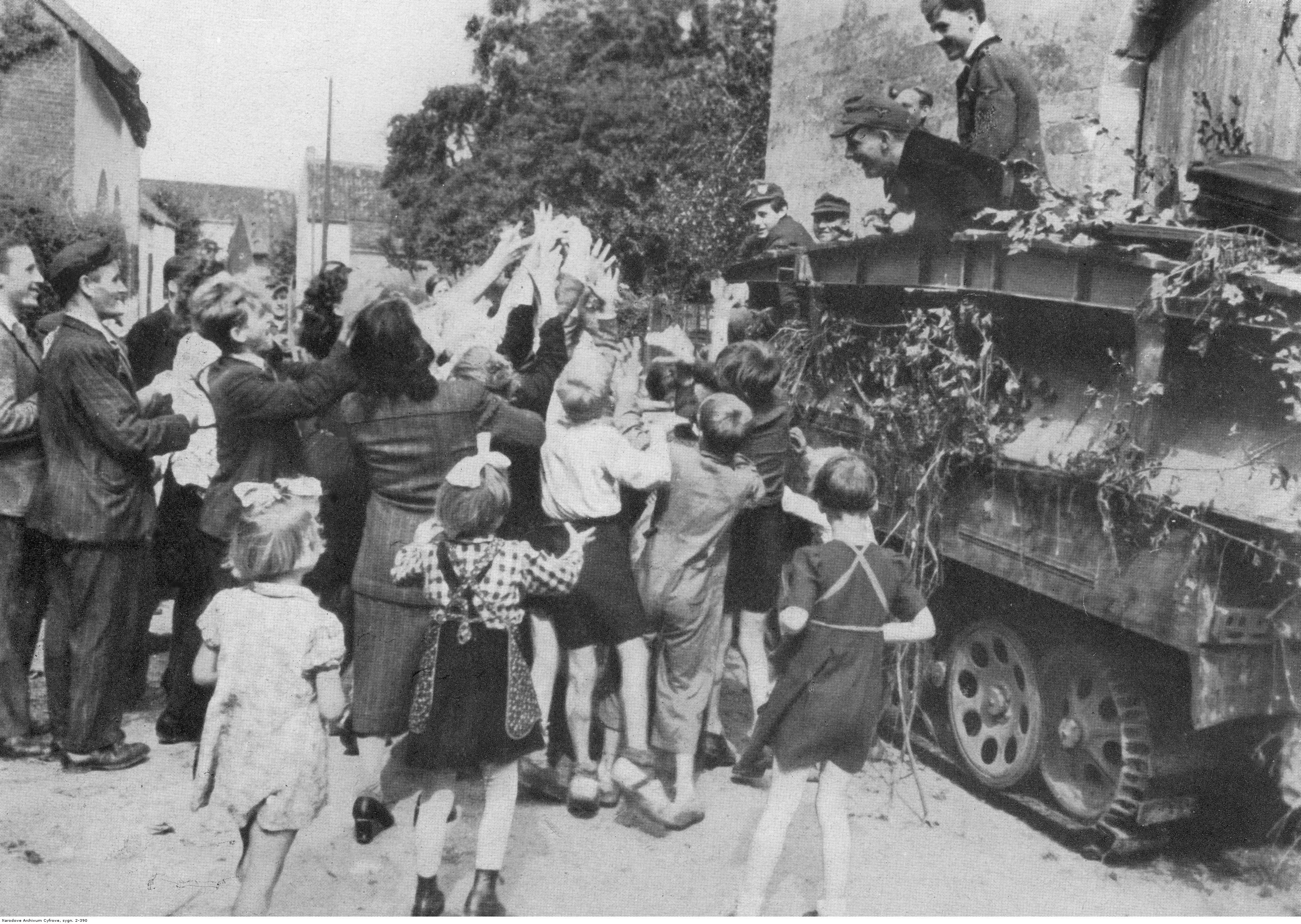
German Sd Kfz 251/7 Ausf D welcomed by the public in a town in West Germany. Soldiers throw candy to children. October 1944

There were 23 official variants, and sundry unofficial variants. Each variant is identified by a suffix to the model number; however, there was some overlap in the variant numbers.

=== Main variants ===
- Sd.Kfz. 251/1 - Schützenpanzerwagen. Standard personnel carrier.
  - Sd.Kfz. 251/1 Ausf. A Ungepanzerte. Made with 5mm mild steel plates instead of rolled homogenous armour, to make up numbers due to slow initial Sd. Kfz. 251 production. Around 350 made up to mid 1940.
  - 251/1 I - with intercom facilities
  - 251/1 II - Rocket launcher (called "Stuka zu Fuß" (Walking Stuka) or Wurfrahmen 40) equipped with six side-mounted frames for launching 280 mm or 320 mm Wurfkoerper rockets.
  - Sd.Kfz. 251/1 - Falke Infrared imaging equipment for driver and MG 42 or MG 34 machine gun operator, to be used in combination with Sd.Kfz. 251/20 Uhu. Mostly Ausf. D variants.
- Sd.Kfz. 251/2 - Schützenpanzerwagen (Granatwerfer). 81 mm Mortar carrier. Carried 66 rounds for the Granatwerfer 42. A base plate was also stored so that the mortar could be offloaded and used.
- Sd.Kfz. 251/3 - mittlerer Kommandopanzerwagen (Funkpanzerwagen). Communications vehicle, fitted with extra radio equipment for command use in Ausf. C and Ausf. D versions. (Note: Sd.Kfz. 251/3 was produced after Sd.Kfz. 251/6, and changed designations in the process)
  - 251/3 I - FuG8 and FuG5 radios
  - 251/3 II - FuG8 and FuG5 radios
  - 251/3 III - FuG7 and FuG1 radios (for ground to air coordination)
  - 251/3 IV - FuG11 and FuG12 Radios (with 9 metre telescopic mast); Command vehicle variant (Kommandowagen)
  - 251/3 V - FuG11 Radio
- Sd.Kfz. 251/4 - Schützenpanzerwagen für Munition und Zubehör des leIG18. Gun-towing tractor, initially for use with the 7.5 cm leichtes Infanteriegeschütz 18 infantry gun. Later used to tow the 50 mm Pak 38, 75 mm PaK 40 anti-tank gunss and the 10.5 cm leFH 18 light field howitzer.
- Sd.Kfz. 251/5 - Schützenpanzerwagen für Pionierzug. Assault Engineer vehicle with inflatable boats stored in the side storage lockers, and light dismantleable assault bridges stored inside through loss of a seat for more storage space. Early command vehicles for Pioneer platoons (Pionierzug) were equipped with a 37 mm Pak 36 anti-tank gun mount.
- Sd.Kfz. 251/6 - mittlere Funkpanzerwagen (Kommandopanzerwagen). Command version equipped with map boards, cipher and encoding machines, and Enigma equipment. Probably only made in versions Ausf. A and Ausf. B. Replaced by the 251/3 IV command SPW.
- Sd.Kfz. 251/7 I - Pionierpanzerwagen. Assault engineer vehicle with fittings to carry assault bridge ramps on the sides.
  - 251/7 II - As above but with different radio.
- Sd.Kfz. 251/8 I - Krankenpanzerwagen. Armored ambulance capable of carrying up to 8 seated casualties or 4 seated casualties and 2 stretcher cases.
  - 251/8 II - As above but fitted with FuG5 radio and 2m rod antenna. Assigned to HQ and Panzer units.
- Sd.Kfz. 251/9 - Schützenpanzerwagen (7.5 cm KwK37). Equipped with a 7.5 cm KwK 37 L/24 low velocity gun, using the same pedestal gun mount employed on the StuG III. Nicknamed "Stummel" ("stump"). In 1944, both the 7.5 cm K 51 L/24 and K 51/1 L/24 in a revised modular gun mount was introduced to facilitate production that also incorporated a coaxial MG42. This universal gun mount was also used to create the Sd.Kfz. 250/8 variant and the Sd.Kfz. 234/3.
- Sd.Kfz. 251/10 - Schützenpanzerwagen (3.7 cm PaK). Equipped with a 37 mm Pak 36 anti-tank gun mount. Issued to platoon leaders as a fire support vehicle. Early versions used the whole top half of a Pak 36 with full gunshield, but later ausf. C & D used a much smaller half-size gunshield so that the vehicle did not advertise its firepower, so it looked more like a regular 251/1 and would thus not be targeted.
- Sd.Kfz. 251/11 - Fernsprechpanzerwagen. Telephone line layer.
- Sd.Kfz. 251/12 - Messtrupp und Gerätpanzerwagen. Survey and instrument carrier for artillery units. Never built.
- Sd.Kfz. 251/13 - Schallaufnahmepanzerwagen. Sound recording carrier for artillery units. Never built.
- Sd.Kfz. 251/14 - Schallaufnahmepanzerwagen. Sound ranging carrier for artillery units. Never built.
- Sd.Kfz. 251/15 - Lichtauswertepanzerwagen. Flash spotting carrier for artillery units. Never built.
- Sd.Kfz. 251/16 - Flammpanzerwagen. Fitted with two flame projectors and initially a rear-mounted flamethrower, detachable but still connected to the vehicle, to be operated by dismounted infantry. This was in addition to the standard forward machine gun mount. Six Sd.Kfz. 251/16 Flammpanzerwagens were authorised for issue to each Panzergrenadier regiment or in the Pioneer battalion. Though vulnerable, they were used very successfully at night to quickly attack enemy infantry who had just captured German trenches, hitting the enemy before they could consolidate and bring up the heavy weapons that would make them much costlier to defeat later. Late ausf. D versions had larger gunshields.
- Sd.Kfz. 251/17 - Schützenpanzerwagen (2 cm). Platoon commander's vehicle armed with a 2 cm KwK 38 autocannon on a Schwebelafette pedestal mounting with a small armored turret to protect the gunner. It was issued mainly to replace the Sd.Kfz. 251/10 and similarly used 250/10 and 250/11. The gun mount permitted a high gun elevation for use as air defence gun.
- Sd.Kfz. 251/18 I - Beobachtungspanzerwagen. Artillery observation vehicle.
  - 251/18 Ia - Differences unknown, likely different radio fit.
  - 251/18 II - Armored observation vehicle.
  - 251/18 IIa - Different radio.
- Sd.Kfz. 251/19 - Fernsprechbetriebspanzerwagen. Telephone exchange vehicle.
- Sd.Kfz. 251/20 - Schützenpanzerwagen (Infrarotscheinwerfer) Introduced in late 1944, it mounted a 60 cm infrared searchlight with a range of 1.5 km for illuminating targets at night. Known as "Uhu" (Eagle Owl), they guided IR sight-equipped Panther tanks to targets that were out of range of their own smaller infrared searchlights.
- Sd.Kfz. 251/21 - Schützenpanzerwagen (Drilling MG151s). Anti-aircraft and ground support variant equipped with a triple-mount ("Drilling" in German means "triple") of MG151 autocannon; early version being MG151/15 mm cannon, later being MG151/20 mm Luftwaffe cannon, on a Kriegsmarine triple mount. Strong firepower, especially when organised into platoons of 6 SPW. With a combined rate of fire of 2000 RPM, it could fire off its full load of 3000 rounds in 90 seconds.
- Sd.Kfz. 251/22 - 7.5 cm PaK40 L/46 auf mittlerem Schützenpanzerwagen. Fitted with a 75 mm PaK 40 anti-tank gun. Probably too big a gun for the carriage, overloaded but effective, and the Yugoslav military was still using captured examples into the 1950s.
- Sd.Kfz. 251/23 - 2 cm Hängelafette 38 auf mittlerem Schützenpanzerwagen. Reconnaissance variant intended to replace the Sd.Kfz. 250/9 and fitted with the same turret mounting as the Sd.Kfz. 234/1 armoured car. Probably never built.

=== Field modified variants ===
Various field modified variants also existed during World War II.

- A kit for installing an armoured map table in place of the forward MG34 mount in use in 1941.
- One interesting variant was made at the closing stages of the war, when German forces removed the armored bodies of damaged Sd.Kfz. 251s and installed them on light truck chassis, resulting in a wheeled variant of the Sd.Kfz. 251. At least two were made in this way judging by their number plates.
- An Sd.Kfz.251 Ausf.D modified with a dual 12 cm Granatwerfer 42.

=== Czechoslovakia ===
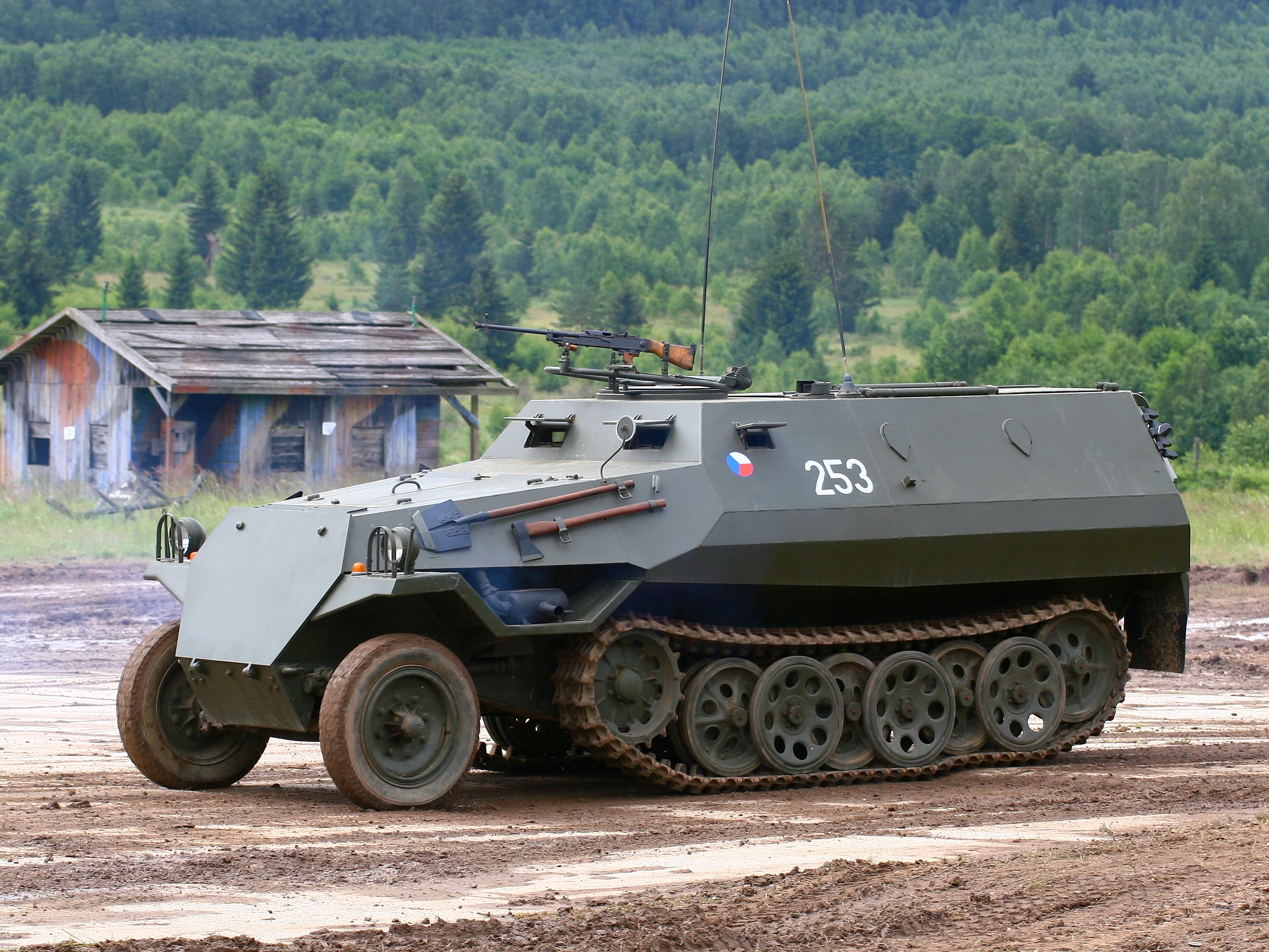
Tatra OT-810 - a Czechoslovak post-war version of the Sd.Kfz. 251 produced by the company Podpolianske strojárne Detva in Slovakia.

- OT-810 – Czechoslovak modified version known as Tatra OT-810 was made by Podpolianske strojárne Detva. About 1,500 vehicles were built during 1958–62, they have had an air-cooled diesel engine made by Tatra and armored roof over the troop compartment for better protection in case of nuclear war. The vehicle was not liked by those who used it and was nicknamed "Hitler's revenge". Last vehicles were removed from Czech Army magazines in 1995. Around 1,500 were made.
- OT-810D – OT-810 armed with an 82 mm BZK vz. 59 recoilless rifle in a raised rear superstructure, similar to the Sd.Kfz. 251/22. The cannon could be removed from the vehicle and after mounting the wheels it could be used outside. On the OT-810D, the rear compartment was also changed in this modification, a ramp was added to facilitate handling of the cannon.

== See also ==
- Kégresse track – Continuous track consisting of a flexible belt rather than interlocking metal segments
- Sd.Kfz. 7 – (Nazi Germany)
- Sd.Kfz. 250 – (Nazi Germany)
- M2 half-track car
- M3 Half-track – (United States)

== Sources ==
- Culver, Bruce; Laurier, Jim (Illustrator) (November 1998), SdKfz 251 Half-Track 1939-45, vol. New Vanguard #25 (2nd ed.), Osprey Publishing, ISBN 978-1-85532-846-4
- Doyle, Hilary Louis; Friedli, Lukas (2016). Final Developments of the Schützenpanzer Sd.Kfz.251 to Vollketten M.S.P. Kätzchen. Panzer Tracts. Vol. 15–4. Boyds, Maryland: Panzer Tracts.
- Francois, David (2020). Operation Danube: Soviet and Warsaw Pact Intervention in Czechoslovakia, 1968. Helion & Company. ISBN 978-1913336295.
- Kliment, Charles; Greer, Don (March 1981), Sd.Kfz. 251 in action, vol. Armor No.21 (1st ed.), Squadron/Signal Publications, ISBN 978-0-89747-124-4
- Ștefănescu, Alexandru V. (2020). În umbra marelui Reich: Tehnica de luptă a armatei române pe Frontul de Est (1941–1944) [In the Shadow of the Great Reich: Battle Technique of the Romanian Army on the Eastern Front (1941–1944)] (in Romanian). Târgoviște, Romania: Cetatea de Scaun. ISBN 9786065375055.
