= Schwerer Panzerspähwagen =

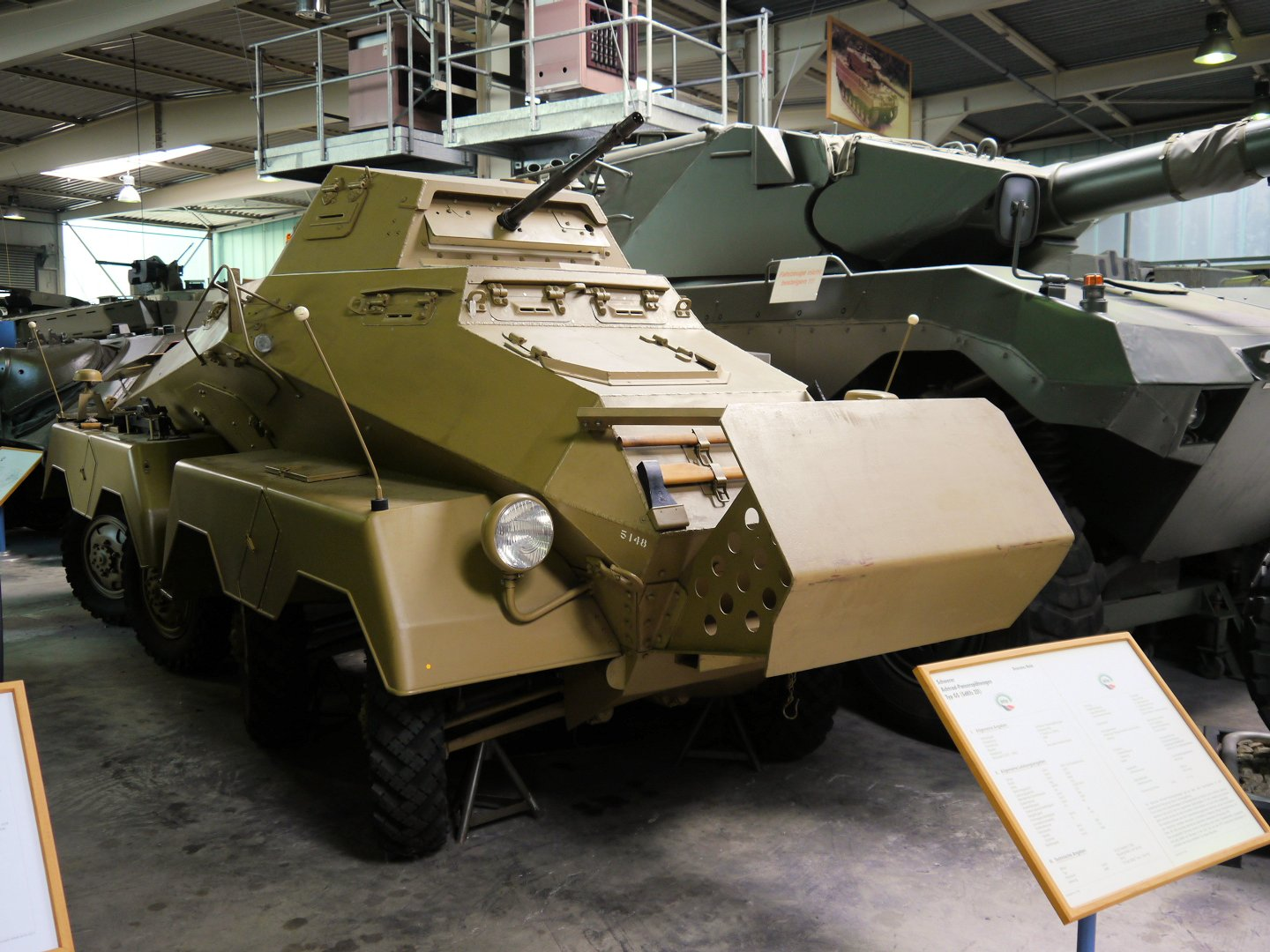
- Sd.Kfz. 231 8 rad at the Wehrtechnische Studiensammlung Koblenz
- Type: Armoured car
- Place of origin: Nazi Germany

Service history
- In service: 1932–1945
- Used by: Nazi Germany
- Wars: World War II

Production history
- Unit cost: 57,290 ℛ︁ℳ︁
- Produced: 1932–1936 (6-rad); 1937–1943 (8-rad); 1943–1945 (234)
- No. built: 6-rad: about 130; 8-rad: 947; 234 family: 478

Specifications
- Mass: 8.3 tons
- Length: 5.9 m (19 ft 4 in)
- Width: 2.2 m (7 ft 3 in)
- Height: 2.9 m (9 ft 6 in)
- Crew: 4 (commander, gunner, driver, secondary driver)
- Armor: 8–15 mm (0.31–0.59 in)
- Main armament: 2 cm KwK 30 L/55
- Secondary armament: 7.92 mm MG34 machine gun
- Engine: 8-cyl petrol 155 PS (153 hp; 114 kW)
- Suspension: 6 or 8 wheels
- Operational range: 300 km (190 mi)
- Maximum speed: 85 km/h (53 mph) (on road) / 31 km/h (19 mph) (off-road)

The Schwerer Panzerspähwagen (German for 'heavy armoured reconnaissance vehicle'), is a series of six- and eight-wheeled armoured cars that were used by Germany during the Second World War.

In the German Army, armoured cars were intended for the traditional cavalry missions of reconnaissance and screening. They scouted ahead and to the flank of advancing mechanized units to assess enemy location, strength and intention. Their primary role was reconnaissance, but they would engage similar or light units and at times attempt to capture enemy patrols.

== History ==
The heavy Panzerspähwagen was a large but fast addition to the German Army. The original 6-Rad (six wheel) versions were based on a 6x4 truck with an armoured body, but by 1937 they were being replaced by 8-Rad versions. During the replacement phase, the Sd.Kfz. (Sonderkraftfahrzeug, 'special vehicle') numbers were carried directly over; differentiation was made by the inclusion of 6-Rad or 8-Rad in the vehicle's name.

These vehicles were used throughout the war in various guises and first saw combat in the campaign against Poland and in the Battle of France. Later, they saw use in both the USSR and North Africa campaigns. Extreme climatic conditions in both these areas proved too severe for the vehicle. In the USSR, adverse ground conditions immobilized 150 Sd.Kfz 232s during the first wet season of the campaign. The speed of the eight-wheeled cars made them the best scouting vehicles that Rommel had for long-range reconnaissance across the wide desert territory.

== Armour ==
The Sd.Kfz. 232 had 15 mm (0.59 in) of slightly sloped homogeneous steel armour on the front, 8 mm (0.31 in) on the sides, and 10 mm (0.39 in) on the back, with 6 mm (0.24 in) and 5 mm (0.20 in) of armour on the top and bottom respectively. This armour was designed to provide protection from small arms fire and HE fragments; it was ineffective against heavier weapons. After the French campaign, additional spaced frontal armour plate was added to provide better protection. Armour was increased up to 30 mm (1.2 in) in the later Sd.Kfz. 234 series. However, it was not designed to provide protection from anti-tank weapons.

== Armament ==
The Sd.Kfz. 232 was armed with a 20 mm KwK 30 L/55 autocannon. This cannon was based on the 20 mm FlaK 30 anti-aircraft gun, and was capable of firing at a cyclic rate of 280 rounds per minute.

The 20 mm (0.79 in) cannon was not designed to defeat enemy tanks; experiments were made towards replacing it with a heavier gun, which resulted in the Sd.Kfz. 234/2. The Sd.Kfz. 234/2's 50 mm (2.0 in) gun could penetrate and knock out Allied armoured cars and light tanks, but this was not the vehicle's role. The role intended was for the car's armour to protect the crew from small arms fire during reconnaissance missions.

Using high explosive ammunition, the 20 mm (0.79 in) autocannon was highly effective against infantry and unarmoured vehicles. Great success was also achieved by replacing the regular armour-piercing explosive ammunition with Armour Piercing Composite Rigid rounds, but this ammunition was in chronically short supply.

== Propulsion ==
Production versions of the Sd.Kfz. 232 were fitted with a 155 PS (153 hp; 114 kW), eight-cylinder Büssing-NAG L8V-G petrol engine, which gave a top speed of 85 km/h (53 mph) and a range of 300 km (190 mi).

== Crew ==
A crew of four was typical. The commander and gunner sat in the turret. The Sd.Kfz. 232 employed a dual driver arrangement, with one driver seated at each end of the vehicle. This allowed the vehicle to be driven in either direction (forward or backward) with ease.

== Six wheelers ==
All 6-rad versions were produced from 1932 to 1937.

Sd.Kfz. 231

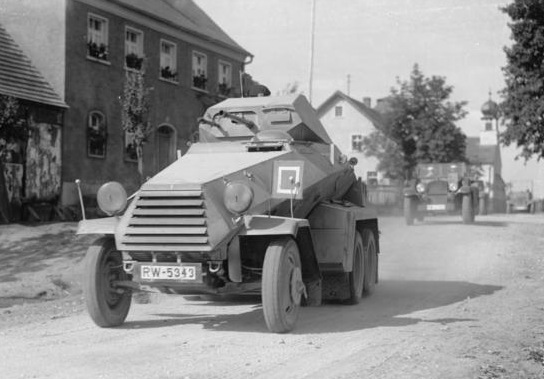
6 Rad Sd.Kfz. 231

The first of the German armoured cars, the Sd.Kfz. 231, was based on a modified Daimler-Benz, Büssing or Magirus 6x4 truck chassis. The 231 was armed with a 2 cm KwK 30 L/55 autocannon, and a Maschinengewehr 13 machine gun. The 231 was introduced into service in 1932 and began to be replaced in 1937 when the German Army switched production to 8-wheeled armoured cars instead of 6-wheeled. Despite being replaced, they were used by Aufklärungs ('reconnaissance') units during the Invasion of Poland, the Battle of France, and the invasion of the USSR. They were withdrawn afterwards for use in internal security and training. The crew consisted of a commander, gunner, driver, and a radio operator/rear driver.

Sd.Kfz. 232

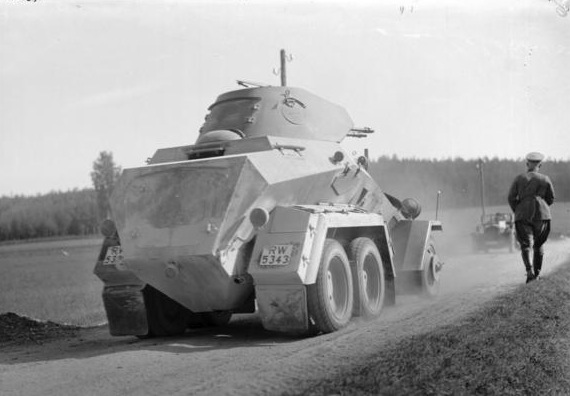
6 Rad Sd.Kfz. 231 in Bavaria in 1935

The 232 carried a Fu.Ger.11 SE 100 medium-range and a Fu.Spr.Ger.A short-range radio. This model was very distinctive because of the heavy "bedspring" antenna over most of the hull. This antenna was supported by two insulated vertical connecting tubes at the back corners and an inverted U-shape tube construction on the turret sides with a central joint that allowed the turret its full 360° traverse.

Sd.Kfz. 263

This was a radio vehicle, Funkspähwagen, equipped with extra long-range radio equipment and an additional radio operator. To support the additional equipment, the turret was omitted, the superstructure was raised and only a single ball-mounted machine gun was mounted.

== Eight wheelers ==
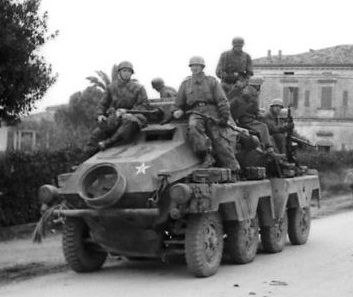
German Fallschirmjäger riding a Sd.Kfz. 231 8-Rad in Italy, 1943.

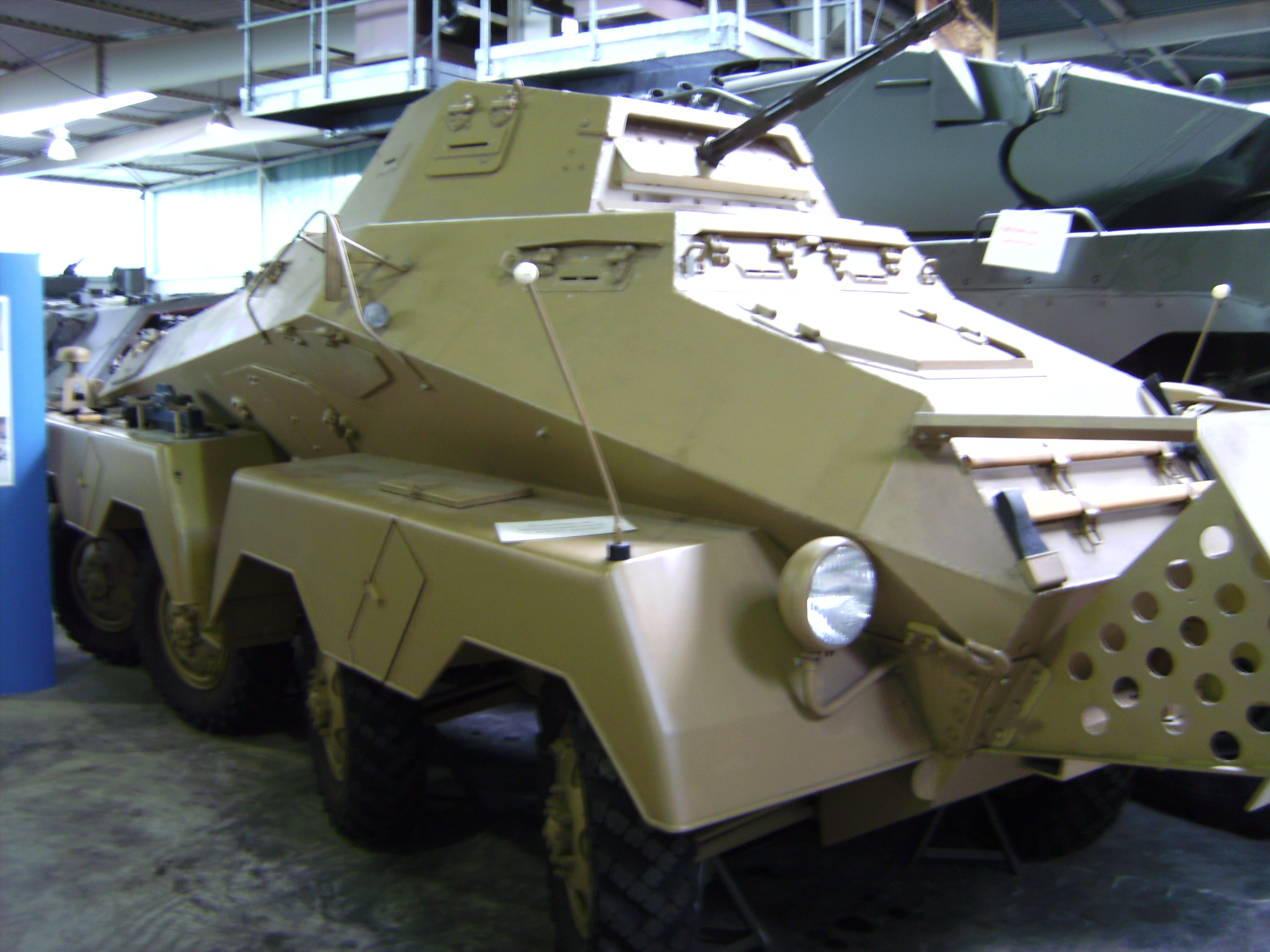
German Sd.Kfz. 232. Note independent steering on each of the wheels.

=== Sd. Kfz. 231 family ===
As the cross-country performance of the 6-wheeled armoured cars was deemed insufficient, the Heer Ordnance department (WaPrw 6) signed a contract with Büssing to develop an eight-wheel armoured car with all-wheel-drive, all-wheel-steering and two driver positions at front and rear. Deutsche Werke in Kiel were contracted to design the armoured body. The turret in the 231/232 series was altered to a hexagonal shape for increased internal volume, it was equipped with a long barrelled 2 cm KwK 30 L/55 autocannon and a coaxial 7.92 mm MG 34 machine gun.

The Sd. Kfz. 231, 232 and 263 were initially built on chassis slightly modified for their needs. From July 1942 they were built on the same Einheitsfahrgestell chassis and had their armour increased to 30 mm. From September 1941, a more powerful engine was installed, providing 180 PS instead of 155 PS. From late 1940 Stand-off angled armour plates were mounted about 50 cm in front of the vehicles. This additional armour was retrofitted to older vehicles and dropped with introduction of the strengthened front armour in July 1942.

Sd. Kfz. 231

This was the standard reconnaissance variant built from 1937 to 1941. From July 1941, any need for a 231 was fulfilled by producing a 232 without the additional radio equipment. The official name was Schwerer Panzerspähwagen Sd. Kfz. 231 (8-rad).

Sd. Kfz. 232

The Sd. Kfz. 232 (8-Rad), which was produced from 1938 to 1943, was a 231 with additional medium range radio sets and a large frame aerial. From 1942, a small Sternantenne ('star aerial') replaced the frame aerial, a modification retrofitted to older models. The official name was Schwerer Panzerspähwagen (Fu) Sd. Kfz. 232 (8-rad).

Sd. Kfz. 233

This was equipped with a short barrelled (L/24) 7.5 cm KwK 37 gun and based on the open-topped superstructure of the Sd. Kfz. 263 (8-Rad) radio vehicle. 109 of these vehicles were built at the Büssing plant between December 1942 and October 1943. A further 10 were converted from 263 chassis in October 1942. This variant of the Sd.Kfz. series entered service during 1942 and remained in use throughout the war. They were issued as a platoon of six vehicles in support of reconnaissance battalions. The official name was Schwerer Panzerspähwagen (7,5 cm) Sd. Kfz. 233.

Sd. Kfz. 263 (8-rad)

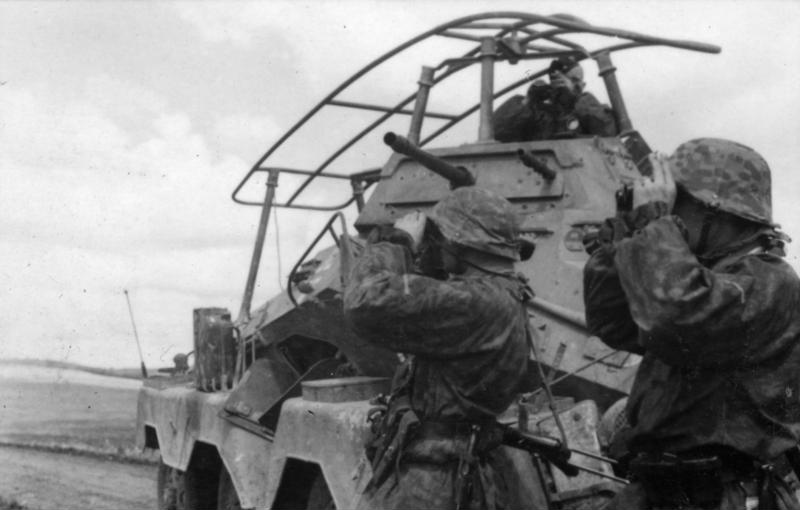
8 Rad Sd.Kfz. 232 radio vehicle of the 5th SS Panzer Division Wiking in Russia, 1941.

This was an eight-wheeler with an increased height superstructure armed with a single 7.92 mm MG 34 machine gun. It was a dedicated radio vehicle with the bedstead frame aerial. The official name was Panzerfunkwagen Sd. Kfz. 263 (8-rad).

=== Sd.Kfz. 234 family ===
The Sd.Kfz. 234 series were completely new designs, of a similar size and appearance to the Sd.Kfz. 231 family that they replaced. They were powered by a Tatra diesel. One external difference is the single-piece mudguards compared to the two-piece mudguards on the 232 series.

Sd. Kfz. 234/1

The Sd.Kfz. 234/1 was fitted with a 2 cm KwK 38 L/55 gun and coaxial 7.92 mm MG 34 or MG 42 machine gun in a rotating six-sided open-topped turret. The open top was protected from grenades by a mesh-covered frame. The second version to enter production, it was built from July 1944 to the end of war.

Sd. Kfz. 234/2

This version had a turret adapted from the cancelled VK 1602 Leopard mounting a long barrel (60 calibres) 5 cm KwK 39/1, similar to the weapon previously used on the later versions of the Panzer III. It weighed nearly 12 tons but was still capable of 85 km/h (53 mph). It was one of the most heavily armed armoured cars available. However, engagement was strictly discouraged due to its thin armour, and also due to its intended role of reconnaissance. The armoured car could be driven backwards by the radio operator in an emergency. Series production started in December 1943 and ended in July 1944, with production switching to 234/1 and 234/3. Many publications use the name "Puma" for this vehicle, but this was neither officially used nor was it a nickname.

Sd. Kfz. 234/3

This version, like the Sd.Kfz. 233, carried the short-barreled (24 calibres) 7.5 cm K 51 gun, in a raised open superstructure. The gun's low velocity made its armour-piercing round ineffective against most Allied tanks, but allowed the high-explosive shell casing to be thinner and thus contain more explosive. The HEAT round for this weapon was, however, effective against vehicles. In December 1944, production ended in favour of the 234/4.

Sd. Kfz. 234/4

Another variant of the 8 wheeler, but mounting a 7.5 cm PaK 40 L/46 anti-tank gun in an open compartment. This variant was similar to the Marder tank destroyer series in that it was a weakly armoured, open-topped anti-tank vehicle that could not engage enemy armour head to head; it was a stop-gap measure.

== See also ==
- Leichter Panzerspähwagen
- BA-20

== Sources ==
- Bishop, Chris (2002). The Encyclopedia of Weapons of World War II. New York: Sterling Publishing. ISBN 1-58663-762-2.
- von Luck, Hans Panzer Commander: The Memoirs of Colonel Hans von Luck. New York, Dell Publishing of Random House (1989) ISBN 0-440-20802-5
