= 2 cm KwK 30 =

German 2 cm cannon

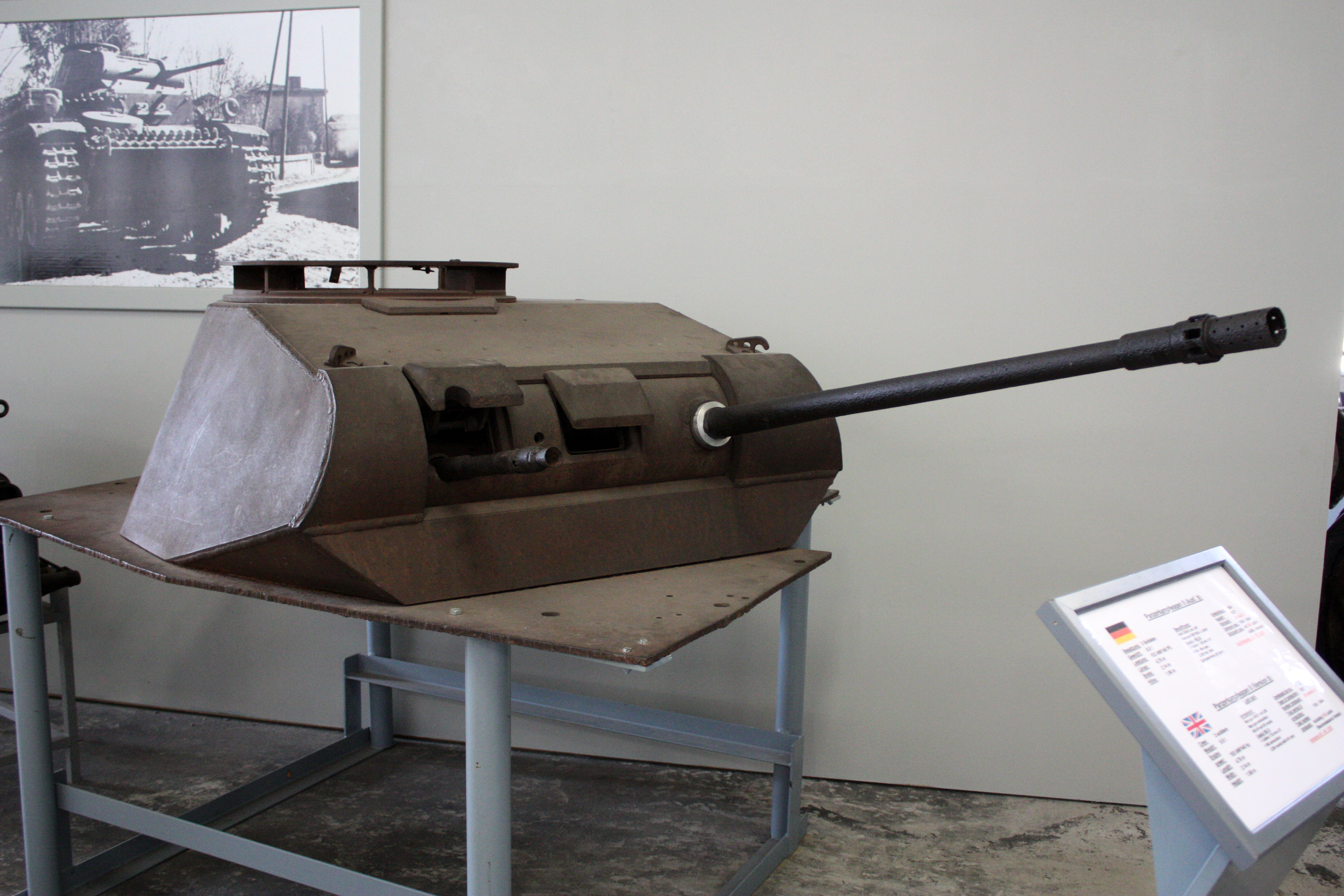
- 2 cm KwK 30
- Type: Tank gun
- Place of origin: Nazi Germany

Service history
- In service: 1935–1945
- Used by: Nazi Germany
- Wars: World War II

Production history
- Manufacturer: Mauser; Rheinmetall-Borsig
- Unit cost: 4,000 RM

Specifications
- Shell: 20×138mmB
- Caliber: 2 cm
- Breech: recoil operated bolt
- Carriage: turret
- Elevation: -9½° to +20°
- Traverse: 360°
- Rate of fire: 260 rpm
- Muzzle velocity: 1,050 m/s with PzGr.40
- Feed system: 10 round box magazine (KwK 38)
- Sights: TZF4; TZF4/36; TZF3a; TZF6

The 2 cm KwK 30 L/55 (2 cm Kampfwagenkanone 30 L/55) was a German 2 cm cannon used as the main armament of the German Sd.Kfz.121 Panzerkampfwagen II light tank and various reconnaissance vehicles. It was used during the Spanish Civil War and the Second World War. It was produced by Mauser and Rheinmetall-Borsig from 1935.

The KwK 30 also served as the basis for the 20 mm C/30, an aircraft variant mounted experimentally in some Heinkel He 112 fighters and proved to make an excellent ground-attack weapon during the Spanish Civil War. Direct ground-attack was not considered a priority for the Luftwaffe and thus, the cannon was not used on other designs.

An improved version, the 2 cm KwK 38 L/55 (2 cm Kampfwagenkanone 38 L/55), was introduced in 1942 and mounted mainly on armored cars. The KwK 38, equipped with the longer L/65 Flakbarrel, was used on the Panzer II Luchs and also on the Sd.Kfz.251/17 Schützenpanzerwagen (2 cm) Platoon leader vehicle, which had the gun on a pedestal mounting with a small armored turret to protect the gunner.

== Vehicles mounted on ==
- Bergepanther Sd.Kfz.179
- Sd.Kfz.121 Panzerkampfwagen II
- Panzer II Luchs (KwK 38)
- Sd.Kfz.222 Leichter Panzerspähwagen
- Sd.Kfz.231 Schwerer Panzerspähwagen
- Sd.Kfz.232 Schwerer Panzerspähwagen
- Sd.Kfz.234/1
- Sd.Kfz.251/17 Schützenpanzerwagen (2 cm)

== Ammunition ==
The 2 cm KwK 30 used the 20×138mmB cartridge. Average penetration performance established against rolled homogenous steel armor plate laid back at 30° from the vertical.

- PzGr.39 (Armour Piercing) (Armor penetration: 23 mm at 100 meters and 14 mm at 500 meters)
- PzGr.40 (Armour Piercing Composite Rigid) (Armor penetration: 40 mm at 100 meters and 20 mm at 500 meters)
- 2 cm Sprgr. 39 (High Explosive)

German designation	US Abbreviation	Projectile weight [g]	Bursting charge	Muzzle velocity [m/s]	Description
Sprenggranatpatrone L'spur mit Zerleger	HEF-T	115	6.2 g HE (PETN + wax)	888 m/s	Nose fuzed tracer round, self-destruct after 5.5 - 6.5 seconds (2000m range) due to tracer burn-through.
Sprenggranatpatrone L'spur W mit Zerleger	HEF-T	120	6.2 g HE (PETN + wax)	?	Nose fuzed tracer round with heat transfer. Self-destruct after 5.5 - 6.5 seconds (2000m range) due to tracer burn-through.
Sprenggranatpatrone L'spur mit Zerleger	HEF-T	120	6.6 g HE (PETN + wax)	?	Boat-tailed HE-Frag. tracer round with nose fuze. Self-destruct at 2000m range due to tracer burn-through.
Sprenggranatpatrone 39 Erd	HEF (M)	132	11 g HE ?	995 m/s	HE-Frag. round with nose fuze, no tracer.
Brandsprenggranatpatrone L'spur (Flak) mit Zerleger	HEI (m)-T	120-122	2.4 g HE (PETN) + 4.1 g incendiary (Aluminium)	900 m/s	Nose fuze, tracer, with self-destruct after 5.5 - 6.5 seconds (2000m range) due to tracer burn-through.
Brandsprenggranatpatrone ohne L'spur (Flak) mit Zerleger	HEI (M)	115-120	22 g total 20 g HE Hexogen 5 (RDX + wax) + 2 g incendiary (Zinc) powder	900 m/s	Nose fuze, no tracer, self-destruct after 5.5 - 8 seconds flight (2000m range). Lack of tracer and high density of incendiary allows heavy filling load.
Brandsprenggranatpatrone vk. L'spur W mit Zerleger	HEI (M)-T	132	19 g HE ? + ? g incendiary (WP)	995 m/s	Nose fuzed HEI tracer round with heat transfer. Self-destruct after 5.5 second (2000m range) due to tracer burn-through.
Brandsprenggranatpatrone mit Zerleger?	HEI (m)	100	? g HE ? + ? g incendiary (WP)	1050 m/s	Nose fuze, no tracer, with self-destruct?
Brandsprenggranatpatrone L'spur mit Zerleger?	HEI (m)-T	100	? g HE ? + ? g incendiary (WP)	1050 m/s	Nose fuze, tracer, with self-destruct? after ? second (?m range) due to tracer burn-through.
Panzergranatpatrone L'spur mit Zerleger	APHEI-T	146	2.4 g (PETN) + ? g incendiary (WP)	830 m/s	Base-fuzed tracer round, with self-destruct due to tracer burn-through after 4.5 second flight (1800m range).
Panzergranatpatrone 39	AP	148	w/o filling	780 m/s	No fuze, no tracer or self-destruct function.
Panzergranatpatrone 40 L'spur	APIHC-T; APICR-T; HVAPI-T	100	Light metal shell, special steel core	1050 m/s	Tungsten carbide core. Tracer round, with no fuze or self-destruct function. Tracer burn-through after 0,9 second flight (600m range). Penetrating effect with incendiary effect due to melting of light metal tip.
Panzerbrandgranatpatrone (Phosphor) L'spur ohne Zerleger	API-T	148	3.0 g incendiary (WP)	780 m/s	Tracer round, with no fuze or self-destruct function. Tracer burn-through after 1,8 second flight (1000m range).
Panzergranatpatrone L'spur ohne Zerleger	AP-T	143	w/o filling	800 m/s	Tracer round, with no fuze or self-destruct function. Tracer burn-through after 1,8 second flight (1000m range).
Panzersprenggranatpatrone L'spur mit Zerleger (Kriegsmarine)	APHE-T	121	3.6 g HE ?	?	Base-fuzed round, self-destruct after 4.5 second flight (1800m range) due to tracer burn-through.
