= Panzer II =

German light tank of the 1930s and World War II

Panzerkampfwagen II Sd.Kfz. 121
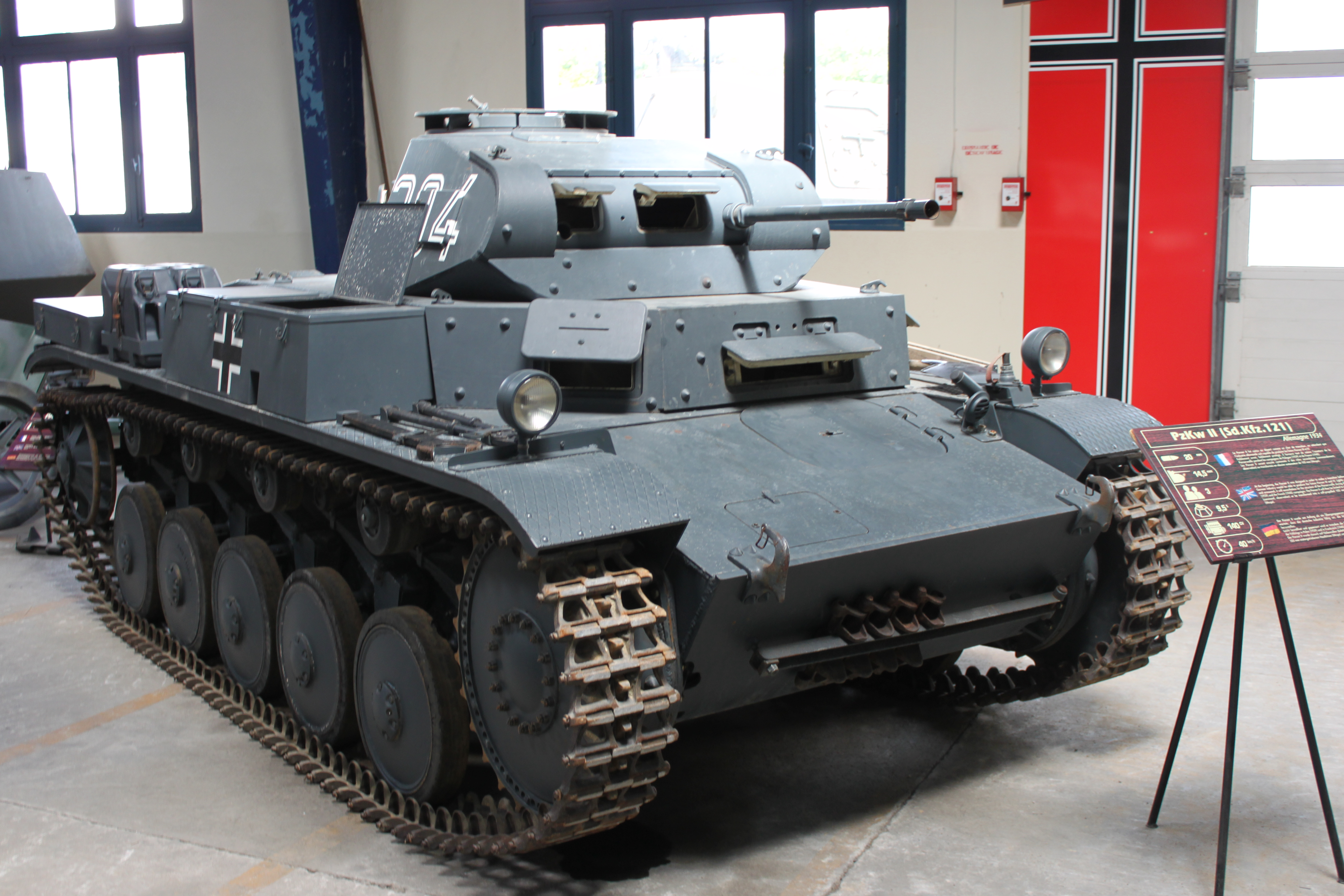
- PzKpfw II Ausf. F at the Musée des Blindés
- Type: Light tank
- Place of origin: Nazi Germany

Service history
- In service: 1936–1945
- Wars: World War II

Production history
- Designed: 1934–1936
- Unit cost: 52,640 ℛ︁ℳ︁ (Ausf. B)
- Produced: 1935 – January 1944
- No. built: 1,856 (excluding conversions)

Specifications (Ausf. c-C)
- Mass: 8.9 t (8.8 long tons)
- Length: 4.81 m (15 ft 9 in)
- Width: 2.22 m (7 ft 3 in)
- Height: 1.99 m (6 ft 6 in)
- Crew: 3 (commander/gunner, driver, loader)
- Armor: 5–15 mm (0.20–0.59 in)
- Main armament: 1 × 2 cm KwK 30 L/55 Ausf. a–F; 1 × 2 cm KwK 38 L/55 Ausf. J–L
- Secondary armament: 1 × 7.92 mm Maschinengewehr 34
- Engine: Maybach HL62 TRM 6-cylinder petrol 140 PS (138 hp, 103 kW)
- Power/weight: 15.7 PS (11.6 kW) / tonne
- Suspension: Leaf spring
- Ground clearance: 0.35 m (1 ft 2 in)
- Fuel capacity: 170 L (45 US gal)
- Operational range: Road: 190 km (120 mi); Cross country: 126 km (78 mi)
- Maximum speed: 39.5 km/h (24.5 mph)

The Panzer II is the common name used for a family of German tanks used in and before World War II. The official German designation was Panzerkampfwagen II (abbreviated Pz.Kpfw. II).

Although the vehicle had originally been designed as a stopgap while larger, more advanced tanks were developed, it nonetheless went on to play an important role in the early years of World War II, during the Polish and French campaigns. The Panzer II was the most numerous tank in the German Panzer divisions at the beginning of the war. It was used both in North Africa against the Western Allies and on the Eastern Front against the Soviet Union.

The Panzer II was supplanted by the Panzer III and IV medium tanks by 1940/1941. By the end of 1942, it had been largely removed from front line service and it was used for training and on secondary fronts. The turrets of the then-obsolete Panzer I and Panzer II tanks were reused as gun turrets on specially built defensive bunkers, particularly on the Atlantic Wall. Production of the tank itself ceased by January 1944, but its chassis remained in use as the basis of several other armoured vehicles, chiefly self-propelled artillery and tank destroyers such as the Wespe and Marder II respectively.

== Development ==
In 1934, delays in the design and production of the Panzer III and Panzer IV medium tanks were becoming apparent. The Panzer I had no weapons capable of defeating armor and thus no chance of success against enemy tanks so a stopgap tank was developed. Designs for a stopgap tank were solicited from Krupp, MAN, Henschel, and Daimler-Benz. Design work on the Panzer II began on 27 January 1934. The first experimental model was ready in February 1935. The final design was based on the Panzer I, but larger, and with a turret mounting a 20 mm autocannon anti-tank gun and leaf spring suspension Production began in 1935, but it took another eighteen months for the first combat-ready tank to be delivered.

== Design ==
=== Armour ===
The Panzer II was designed before the experience of the Spanish Civil War of 1936–39 showed that protection against armour-piercing shells was required for tanks to survive on a modern battlefield. Prior to that, armour was designed to stop machine gun fire and high-explosive shell fragments.

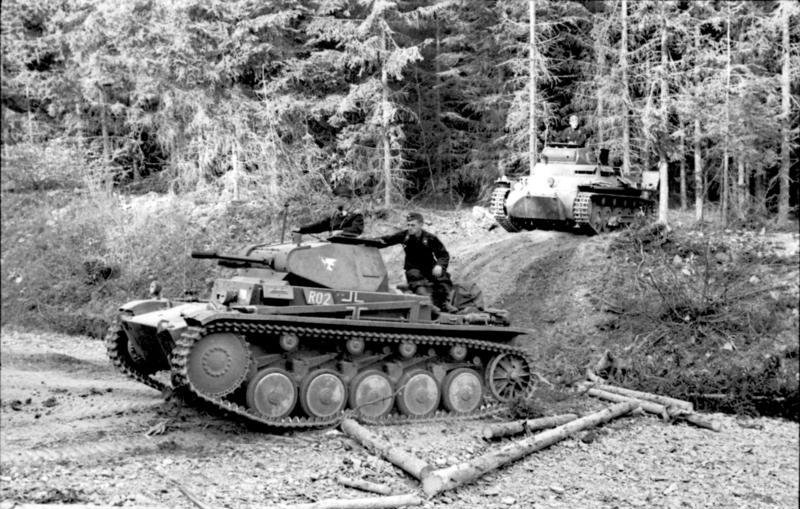
An uparmored Panzer II on the Western front with a Panzer I in the background, May 1940

The Panzer II Ausf. A to C had 14 mm of slightly sloped homogeneous steel armour on the sides, front, and back, with 10 mm of armour on the top and bottom. Most of them were later given increased armour in the front of the vehicle, most noticeable by the changed appearance of the front hull from rounded to boxy shape. Starting with the Ausf. D , the front armour was increased to 30 mm. The Ausf. F had 35 mm front armour and 20 mm side armour. This level of protection was still only proof against small arms fire. This amount of armour could be penetrated by towed anti-tank weapons, such as the Soviet 45mm, the British 2-pounder and the French canon de 47.

=== Armament ===
Most tank versions of the Panzer II were armed with a 2 cm KwK 30 L/55 auto-cannon. Some later versions used the similar 2 cm KwK 38 L/55 or L/65. This auto-cannon was based on the 2 cm FlaK 30 anti-aircraft gun, and was capable of firing at a rate of 600 rounds per minute (280 rounds per minute sustained) from 10-round magazines. A total of 180 shells were carried.

The Panzer II also had a 7.92 mm MG 34 machine gun mounted coaxially with the main gun.

=== Mobility ===
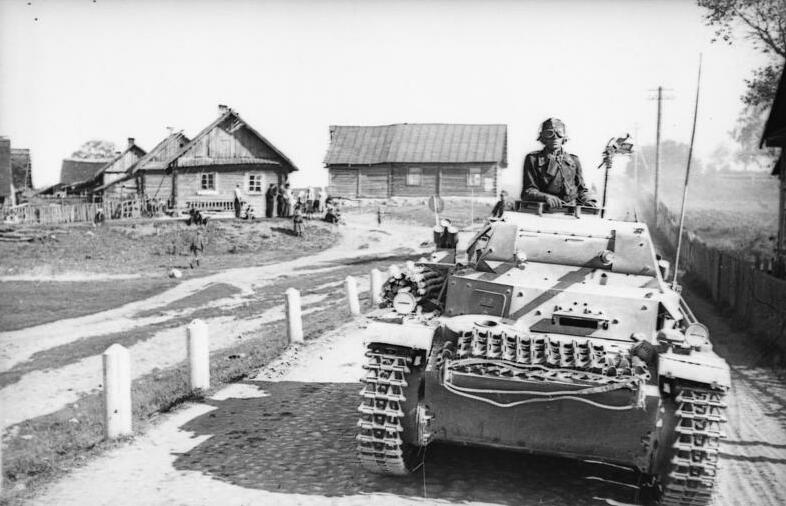
A Panzer II during Operation Barbarossa in 1941 moves along a road outside a village.

All production versions of the Panzer II were fitted with a 140 PS (138 HP), gasoline-fuelled six-cylinder Maybach HL62 TRM engine and ZF transmissions. Models A, B, and C had a top speed of 40 km/h (25 mph). Models D and E had a torsion bar suspension and a better transmission, giving a top road speed of 55 km/h (33 mph) but the cross country speed was much lower than previous models, so the Model F reverted to the previous leaf spring type suspension. All versions had a range of 200 km (120 mi).

=== Crew ===
The Panzer II had a crew of three men. The driver sat in the forward left hull with the gearbox on the right. The commander sat in a seat in the turret, and was responsible for aiming and firing the cannon and co-axial machine gun, while a loader/radio operator sat on the floor of the tank behind the driver. He had a radio on the left and several 20mm ammunition storage bins.

== Variants ==
=== Development and limited production models ===
Panzer II Ausf. c

Panzer II Ausf. a (Pz.Kpfw. IIa)

Not to be confused with the later Ausf. A (the sole difference being the capitalization of the letter A), the Ausf. a was the first version of the Panzer II to be built (albeit in limited numbers), and was subdivided into three sub-variants. The Ausf. a/1 was initially built with a cast idler wheel with rubber tire, but this was replaced after ten production examples with a welded part. The Ausf. a/2 improved engine access problems. The Ausf. a/3 included improved suspension and engine cooling. In general, the specifications for the Ausf. a models was similar, and a total of 75 were produced from May 1936 to February 1937 by Daimler-Benz and MAN. The Ausf. a was considered the 1 Serie under the LaS 100 name.

Panzer II Ausf. b (Pz.Kpfw. II b)

Again, not to be confused with the later Ausf. B, the Ausf. b was the second limited production series embodying further developments, primarily a heavy reworking of suspension components resulting in a wider track and a longer hull. Length was increased to 4.76 metres but width and height were unchanged. Additionally, a Maybach HL62 TR engine was used with new drivetrain components to match. Deck armour for the superstructure and turret roof was increased to 10–12 mm. Total weight increased to 7.9 tonnes. Twenty-five were built by Daimler-Benz and MAN in February and March 1937.

Panzer II Ausf. c (Pz.Kpfw. II c)

As the last of the developmental limited production series of Panzer IIs, the Ausf. c came very close to matching the mass production configuration with the replacement of the six small road wheels with five larger independently sprung road wheels and an additional return roller. The tracks were further modified and the fenders widened. Total length increased to 4.81 m (15 ft 9 in)and width to 2.22 m (7 ft 3 in),. At least 25 of this model were produced from March through July 1937.

=== Main production models ===
Panzer II Ausf. A, B and C

The first true production model, the Ausf. A, included an armour upgrade to 14.5 mm (0.57 in) on all sides, as well as a 14.5 mm floor plate, and an improved transmission. It entered production in July 1937 and was superseded by the Ausf. B in December 1937, which introduced only minimal changes.

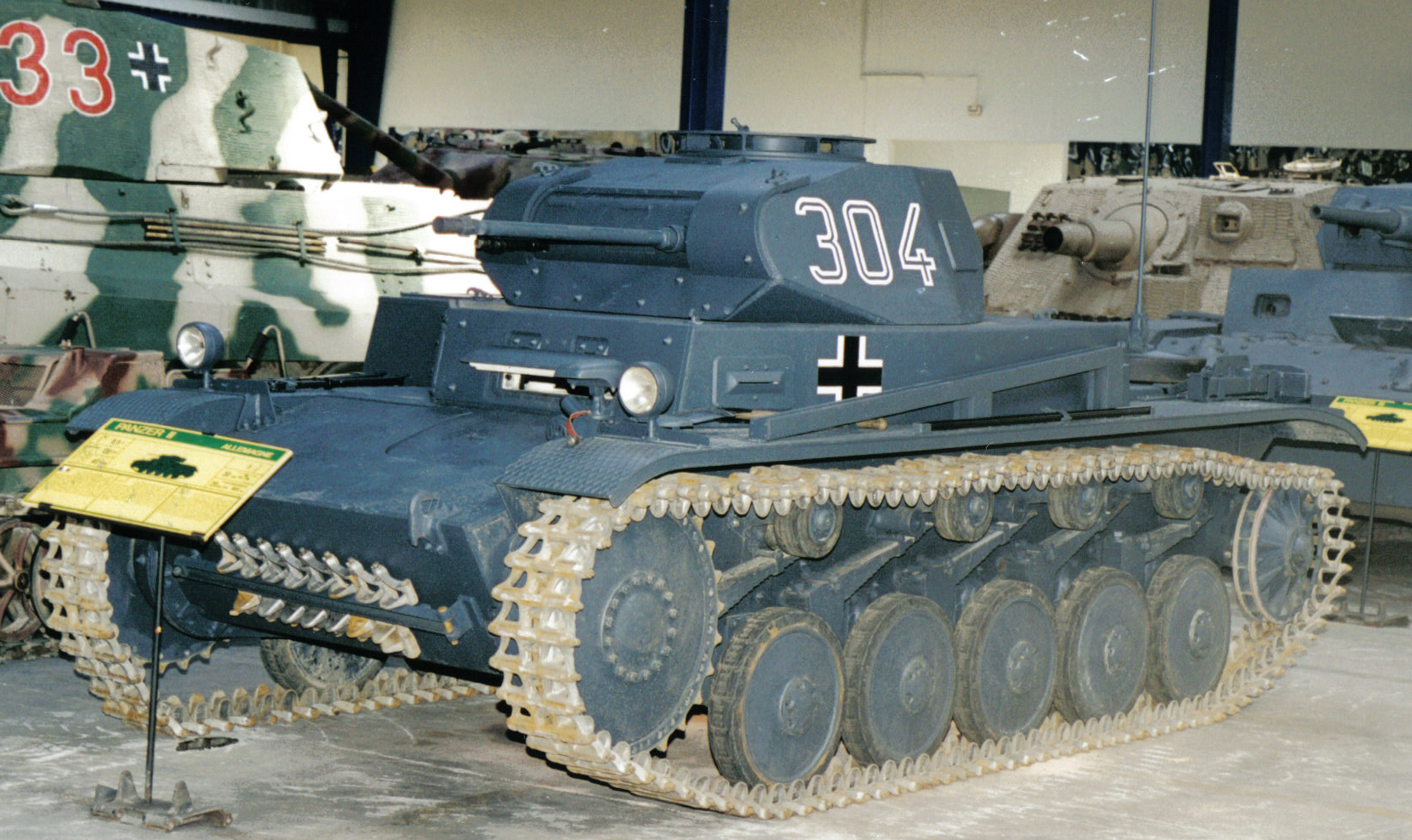
PzKpfw II Ausf. F at the Musée des Blindés

A few minor changes were made in the Ausf. C version, which became the standard production model from June 1938 through April 1940. A total of 1,113 examples of Ausf. c, A, B, and C tanks were built from March 1937 through April 1940 by Alkett, FAMO, Daimler-Benz, Henschel, MAN, MIAG, and Wegmann & Co. These models were almost identical and were used in service interchangeably. This was the most widespread tank version of the Panzer II. Earlier versions of Ausf. C have a rounded hull front, but many had additional armour plates bolted on the turret and hull front. Some were also retro-fitted with commander's cupolas.

Panzer II Ausf. D and E

With a completely new torsion bar suspension with four road wheels, the Ausf. D was developed as a tank for use in the light divisions. After the invasion of Poland the light divisions were converted to Panzer divisions. Only the turret was the same as the Ausf. C model, with a new hull and superstructure design and the use of a Maybach HL62TRM engine driving a seven-gear transmission (plus reverse). The design was shorter (4.65 m) but wider (2.3 m) and taller (2.06 m) than the Ausf. C. Speed was increased to 55 km/h. A total of 43 Ausf. D tanks were built from October 1938 through March 1939 by MAN, and they served in Poland. They were withdrawn in March 1940 for conversion to the flame tank Panzer II (Flamm). The Ausf. E differed from the Ausf. D by having lubricated tracks; seven chassis were completed.

Panzer II Ausf. F

Continuing the conventional design of the Ausf. C, the Ausf. F superstructure front was made from a single piece of armour plate with a redesigned visor. Also, a dummy visor was placed next to it to confuse enemy gunners. The hull was redesigned with a flat 35 mm (1.4 in) plate on its front, and the armour of the superstructure and turret were built up to 30 mm (1.2 in) on the front with 15 mm (0.59 in) to the sides and rear. There was some minor alteration of the suspension and a new commander's cupola as well. Weight increased to 9.5 tonnes. From March 1941 to July 1942, 509 were built; this was the final major tank version of the Panzer II series.

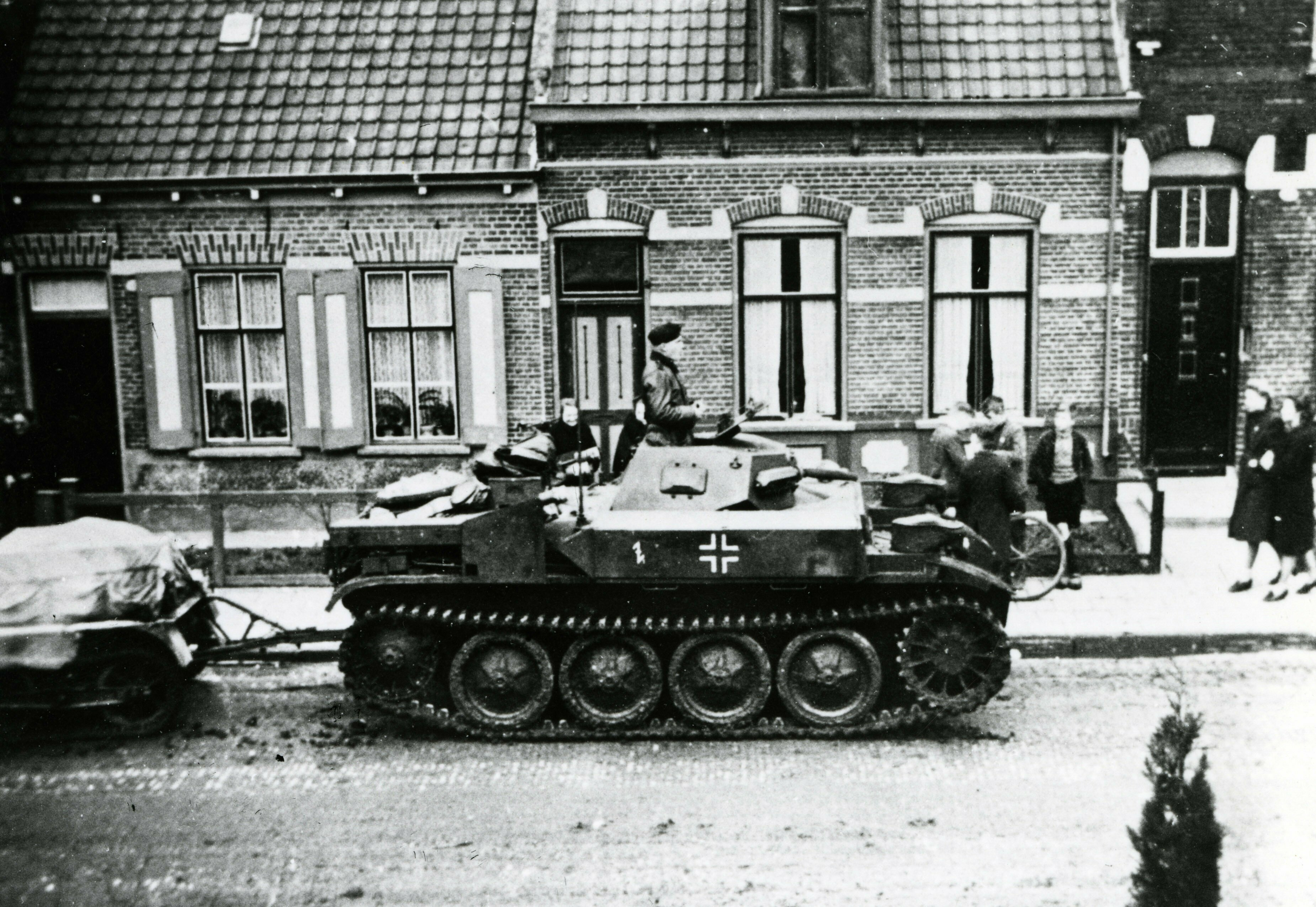
Panzer II (Flamm) known as the "Flamingo" in the West European campaign.

Panzer II (Flamm)

Based on the same suspension as the Ausf. D and Ausf. E tank versions, the Flamm (often wrongly referred to as "Flamingo") used a new turret mounting a single MG34 machine gun, and two remotely controlled flamethrowers mounted in small turrets at each front corner of the vehicle. Each flamethrower could cover the front 180° arc, while the turret traversed 360°.

The flamethrowers were supplied with 320 litres of fuel and four tanks of compressed nitrogen. The nitrogen tanks were built into armoured boxes along each side of the superstructure. Armour was 30 mm to the front and 14.5 mm to the side and rear, although the turret was increased to 20 mm at the sides and rear.

Total weight was 12 tonnes and dimensions were increased to a length of 4.9 m and width of 2.4 m although it was a bit shorter at 1.85 m tall. A FuG2 radio was carried.

One hundred and fifty-one Panzerkampfwagen II (F) (Flamm) vehicles were built from April 1940 through March 1942. Initial production of Ausf. A vehicles was based on 46 Panzer II Ausf. D/E chassis that were never completed as tanks, in March 1940 the 43 still existing Panzer II Ausf. D were recalled for conversion and from August 1941 until the cancellation in March 1942 a further 62 Ausf. B vehicles were made from new-production Ausf. D chassis (out of an order for 150 vehicles). The Panzer II (F) was deployed in the USSR, but was not very successful due to its limited armor, and survivors were soon withdrawn for conversion to Marder II tank destroyers in December 1941.

It is unknown when exactly the Flammpanzer II got the name "Flamingo", however it most likely originated some time after World War 2 and was never officially used for the vehicle.

Panzer II Ausf. L "Luchs"

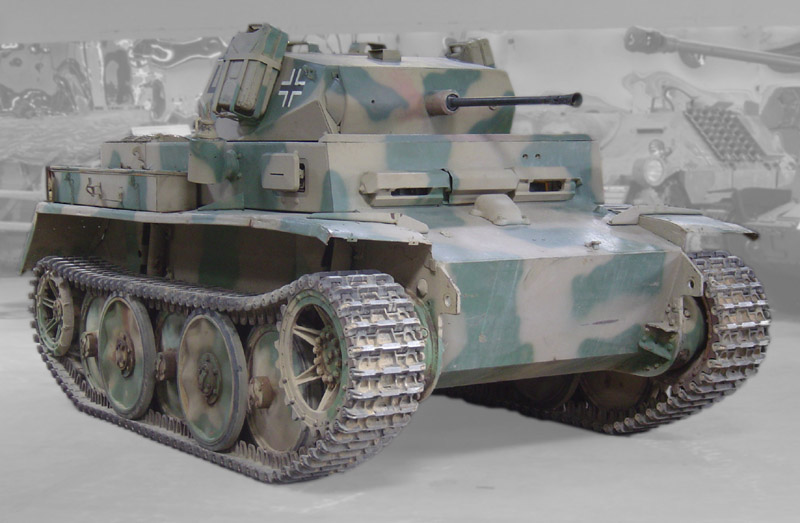
Panzer II Ausf. L in the Musée des Blindés, Saumur

A light reconnaissance tank, the Ausf. L was the only Panzer II design with the Schachtellaufwerk overlapping/interleaved road wheels and "slack track" configuration to enter series production, with 100 being built from September 1943 to January 1944 in addition to the conversion of the four Ausf. M tanks. Originally given the experimental designation VK 1303, it was adopted under the alternate name Panzerspähwagen II and given the popular name Luchs ("Lynx"). The Luchs was larger than the Ausf. G in most dimensions (length 4.63 m; height 2.21 m; width 2.48 m). It was equipped with a six speed transmission (plus reverse), and could reach a speed of 60 km/h (37 mph) with a range of 290 km (180 mi). The FuG12 and FuG Spr a radios were installed, while 330 rounds of 20 mm and 2,250 rounds of 7.92 mm ammunition were carried. Total vehicle weight was 11.8 tonnes. It had 30 mm of armour on the front of the hull and 20 mm of armour on the sides and back and the same on the turret. It accommodated four crew members, the commander (gunner), driver, loader and the radio operator.

=== Self-propelled guns on Panzer II chassis ===
15 cm sIG 33 auf Fahrgestell Panzerkampfwagen II (Sf)

One of the first gun mount variants of the Panzer II design was to emplace a 15 cm sIG 33 heavy infantry gun on a turret-less Panzer II chassis. The prototype utilized an Ausf. B tank chassis, but it was quickly realized that it was not sufficient for the mounting. A new, longer chassis incorporating an extra road wheel was designed and built, named the Fahrgestell Panzerkampfwagen II. An open-topped 15 mm thick armored superstructure sufficient against small arms and shrapnel was provided around the gun. This was not high enough to give full protection for the crew while manning the gun, although they were still covered directly to the front by the tall gun shield. Only 12 were built in November and December 1941. These served with the 707th and 708th Heavy Infantry Gun Companies in North Africa until their destruction in 1943.

7.62 cm PaK 36(r) auf Fahrgestell Panzerkampfwagen II Ausf. D/E (Marder II) (Sd.Kfz. 132)

After a lack of success with conventional and flame tank variants on the Ausf. D/E chassis, it was decided to use the remaining chassis to mount captured Soviet antitank guns. The hull and suspension was unmodified from the earlier models, but the superstructure was built up to provide a large, open-topped fighting compartment with a Soviet 76.2 mm antitank gun, which, while not turreted, did have significant traverse. Only developed as an interim solution, the vehicle was clearly too tall and poorly protected, but had a powerful weapon.

7.5 cm PaK 40 auf Fahrgestell Panzerkampfwagen II (Marder II) (Sd.Kfz. 131)

While the 7.62 cm PaK 36(r) was a good stopgap measure, the 7.5 cm PaK 40 mounted on the tank chassis of the Ausf. F resulted in a better overall fighting machine. New production amounted to 576 examples from June 1942 to June 1943, as well as the conversion of 75 tanks after new production had stopped. The work was done by Daimler-Benz, FAMO, and MAN. A much improved superstructure for the 7.62 cm mounting was built giving a lower profile. The Marder II served with the Germans on all fronts through the end of the war.

5 cm PaK 38 auf Fahrgestell Panzerkampfwagen II

Conceived along the same lines as the Marder II, the 5 cm PaK 38 was an expedient solution to mount the 50 mm antitank gun on the Panzer II chassis. However, the much greater effectiveness of the 75 mm antitank gun made this option less desirable. Production quantity is unknown.

Leichte Feldhaubitze 18 auf Fahrgestell Panzerkampfwagen II (Wespe)

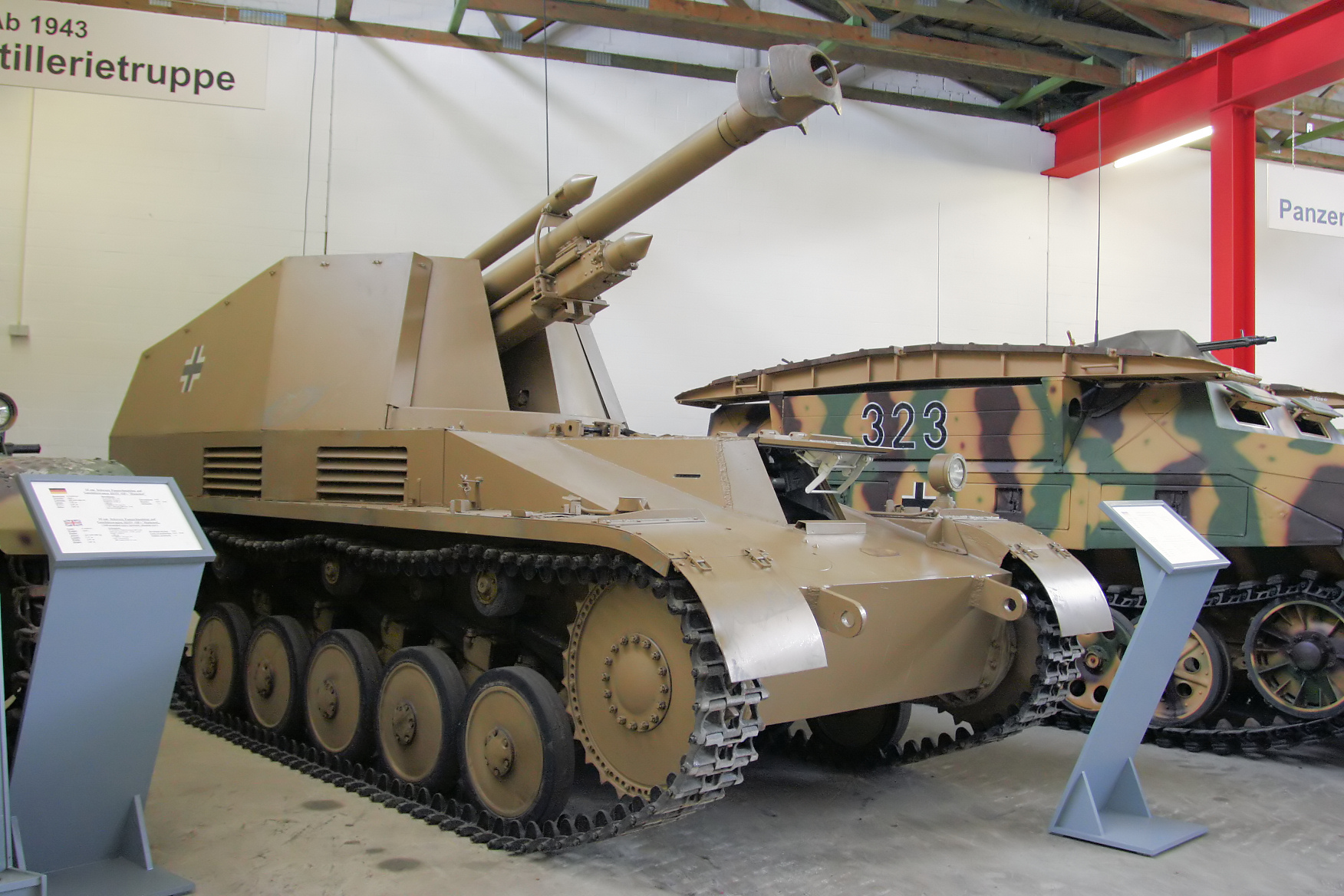
A Wespe at the Deutsches Panzermuseum in Munster, Germany

After the development of the Fahrgestell Panzerkampfwagen II for mounting the sIG 33, Alkett designed a version mounting a 10.5 cm leichte Feldhaubitze 18/2 field howitzer in an open-topped superstructure. This was Germany's only widely produced self-propelled 105 mm howitzer. Between February 1943 and June 1944, 676 were built by FAMO, and it served on all major fronts.

Munitions Selbstfahrlafette auf Fahrgestell Panzerkampfwagen II

To support the Wespe in operation, 159 Wespe chassis were completed without installation of the howitzer, instead functioning as ammunition carriers. They carried 90 rounds of 105 mm calibre. These could be converted to normal Wespes by installation of the leFH 18 in the field if needed.

=== Limited production, experiments and prototypes ===
Panzerkampfwagen II mit Schwimmkörper

One of Germany's first attempts at developing an amphibious tank, the Schwimmkörper was a device built by Gebr Sachsenberg that consisted of two large pontoons, with one attached to each side of a Panzer II tank. The tanks were specially sealed, some modifications to the engine exhaust and cooling were needed, as was an inflatable rubber ring used to seal the turret during amphibious operation. A propeller; linked by a universal joint to an extension, was linked to the tank's engine to provide motive power, steering in water being effected by a rudder mounted behind the propeller. Speeds of up to 6 mph in dead calm were claimed, as was the ability to cope with conditions up to sea state 4. Once ashore the pontoons were detachable. The modified tanks were issued to the 18th Panzer Regiment, which was formed in 1940. However, with cancellation of Operation Sealion, the plan to invade England, the tanks were used in the conventional manner by the regiment on the Eastern Front.

Panzer II Ausf. G (PzKpfw II G)

The fourth and final suspension configuration used for the Panzer II tanks was the five overlapping road wheel configuration termed Schachtellaufwerk by the Germans. This was used as the basis for the redesign of the Panzer II into a reconnaissance tank with high speed and good off-road performance. The Ausf. G was the first Panzer II to use this configuration, and was developed under the experimental designation VK 9.01. There is no record of the Ausf. G being issued to combat units, and only 12 full vehicles were built from April 1941 to February 1942 by MAN. The turrets were subsequently issued for use in fortifications. Two were converted to use the 50mm Pak 38 and troop-tested on the Eastern Front.

Panzer II Ausf. H (Pz.Kpfw. II H)

Given experimental designation VK 9.03, the Ausf. H was intended as the production model of the Ausf. G, with armor for the sides and rear increased to 20 mm and a new four speed transmission (plus reverse) similar to that of the PzKpfw 38(t) nA. Only two prototypes were ever completed by the time of cancellation in September 1942.

Brückenleger auf Panzerkampfwagen II

After failed attempts to use the Panzer I as a chassis for a bridge layer, work moved to the Panzer II, led by Magirus. It is not known how many of these conversions were made, but four were known to have been in service with the 7th Panzer Division in May 1940.

Panzer II Ausf. J (Pz.Kpfw. II J)

Continued development of the reconnaissance tank concept led to the much up-armoured Ausf. J, which used the same concept as the Panzer I Ausf. F of the same period, under the experimental designation VK 16.01. Heavier armour was added, bringing protection up to 80 mm on the front (similar to the maximum armour found on the KV-1 model 1941 Soviet heavy tank) and 50 mm to the sides and rear, with 25 mm roof and floor plates, increasing total weight to 18 tonnes. Equipped with the same Maybach HL45 P as the Pz.Kpfw. I F, top speed was reduced to 31 km/h (19 mph). Primary armament was the 2 cm KwK 38 L/55 gun. 22 were produced by MAN between April and December 1942, and seven were issued to the 12th Panzer Division on the Eastern Front.

Bergepanzerwagen auf Panzerkampfwagen II Ausf. J

A single example of an Ausf. J with a jib in place of its turret was found operating as an armoured recovery vehicle. There is no record of an official program for this vehicle.

Panzer II Ausf. M (Pz.Kpfw. II M)

Using the same chassis as the Ausf. H and the turret and superstructure of the Ausf. L "Luchs", the Ausf. M would have had four crew; however, no examples are known to have been constructed.

Panzerkampfwagen II ohne Aufbau

One use for obsolete Panzer II tanks that had their turrets removed for use in fortifications was as utility carriers. A number of chassis not used for conversion to self-propelled guns were instead handed over to the Engineers for use as personnel and equipment carriers.

Panzer Selbstfahrlafette 1c

Developed in prototype form only, this was one of three abortive attempts to use the Panzer II chassis for mounting a 5 cm PaK 38 gun, this time on the chassis of the Ausf. G. Two examples were produced which had similar weight to the tank version, and both were put in front-line service, but production was not undertaken as priority was given to heavier armed models.

A blueprint for the planned VK 16.02

VK 16.02 “Leopard”

The VK 16.02 was intended to be the 5 cm KwK 39-armed replacement for the Ausf. L, with a Maybach HL157 P engine driving an eight speed transmission (plus reverse). While the hull was based on that of the Pz.Kpfw. II J, it was redesigned after the Panzer V Panther, most noticeably with the introduction of fully sloped frontal armour. Was rejected after developers realized that Panzer IVs and Vs could do similar work without the need for a new vehicle.

== Users ==
- Nazi Germany
- Romania (uncertain) – two tanks captured at the Ploiești oilfields after King Michael's Coup; they were probably Panzer IIs
- Slovak Republic (1939 - 1945)
- Norway (Leftover stock)

== See also ==
- List of World War II military vehicles of Germany
- List of armoured fighting vehicles of World War II
