= VK 16.02 Leopard =

Cancelled German light tank project of WW2

- Type: Light tank
- Place of origin: Nazi Germany

Service history
- In service: Never produced

Production history
- Designer: M.A.N. / MIAG / Daimler-Benz
- Designed: 1942
- Variants: 2

Specifications (as designed)
- Mass: 21,900 kilograms (48,300 lb)
- Length: 4.74 metres (15 ft 7 in)
- Width: 3.1 metres (10 ft 2 in)
- Height: 2.6 metres (8 ft 6 in)
- Crew: 4
- Armor: 16–50 mm
- Main armament: 5 cm KwK 39 (planned)
- Secondary armament: 7.92 mm MG 42 machine gun
- Engine: Maybach HL 157 P 550 horsepower (410 kW)
- Transmission: Maybach OG 55 11 77 semi-automatic
- Suspension: Torsion bar
- Ground clearance: 500mm
- Operational range: 500 kilometres (310 mi) (on roads), 300 kilometres (190 mi) (cross-country)
- Maximum speed: 45 kilometres per hour (28 mph) on roads, 30 kilometres per hour (19 mph) cross-country
- Steering system: Multi-stage

The VK 16.02 Leopard was a planned German light reconnaissance vehicle designed from mid-1941 through to January 1943, with serial production scheduled for April 1943. It was intended to be the replacement of Panzer II Ausf. L "Luchs". The project was canceled in January 1943 before the first prototype was completed as it did not meet the requirements for 1944. A wooden mock up of the Waffenträger (English: "weapon carrier") variant was produced.

== Development ==
Development started in 1941 under M.A.N., which took inspiration from their VK 30.02 design, creating an even more armored, albeit smaller, vehicle, with 80 mm (3.1 in) sloped frontal armor (at the time the Panther prototype only had 60 mm frontal armor). As the Panther project gained importance, Wa Prüf 6 decided to remove the VK 16.02 project from M.A.N. to help them meet deadlines for the Panther project, handing it to MIAG and Daimler-Benz, with the responsibility for the hull to MIAG, and the turret and armament to Daimler-Benz.

Two variants were initially being designed, a lighter one weighing 18 tons and a heavier one weighing 26 tons, but in June 1942 Hitler decided to continue development on only the heavier one, as he deemed protection from enemy anti-tank guns a priority.

In July 1942 MIAG presented a more refined design that was accepted into production, which was planned to start in April 1943, with plans of 20 vehicles per month starting from October 1943.

In a meeting on 13 October 1942 Hitler was informed the lighter variant design was preferred by the troops, as it would better fit the reconnaissance role, while the heavier design had too similar characteristics to the Panther, with the only difference being the smaller gun. Hitler agreed to develop only the lighter variant.

The final design had a combat loaded weight of 21.9 t (21.6 long tons; 24.1 short tons). The armor was 50 mm sloped at 50 degrees on the front, 30 mm on the sides and rear, 16 mm deck and from 16 to 25 mm belly plates. The planned armament was the 5 cm Kw.K.39/1 L/60 cannon, the same that was used on late Panzer IIIs. The engine was the Maybach HL 157 rated at 550 horsepower. In order to increase cross-country performance, the VK 1602 was fitted with 660 mm wide tracks, the same that were used on the Panther. Soon after the Leopard project would be completely discontinued.

A turret similar to that of the Leopard, yet smaller with armor thinner and at lower angles, were later put on the Sd.Kfz. 234/2 armored car.

== Variants ==
Waffenträger Leopard - The Leopard chassis was also planned for use as the base for a 10.5 cm cannon in a Waffenträger configuration.

== Specifications ==
- Weight: 21,900 kg
- Crew: 4 men, commander (gunner), loader, driver, radio operator
- Engine: Maybach HL 157 P / 12-cylinder / 550 hp
- Speed: Road: 45–60 km/h / Cross-Country: 30 km/h
- Range: Road: 500 km / Cross-Country: 300 km
- Length: 4.74 m (15 ft 7 in)
- Width: 3.10 m (10 ft 2 in)
- Height: 2.60 m (8 ft 6 in)
- Armament:
  - 1 × 50mm KwK 39/1 L/60
  - 1 × 7.92mm MG42
- Ammo:
  - 50mm: 50 rounds
  - 7.92mm: 2,400 rounds
- Armor: 16–50 mm

== Sources ==
- Jentz, Thomas & Doyle, Hilary (2002) "Panzer Tracts 20-2"
- Chamberlain, Peter & Doyle, Hilary & Jentz, Thomas (1993) "Encyclopedia of German Tanks of World War Two"
- Spielberger, Walter (2012) "Spezial-Panzerfahrzeuge des Deutschen Heeres"
- Sowodny, Michael (1998) "German Armored Rarities 1935-1945"
