= Sd.Kfz. 234 =

German armoured car of WW2

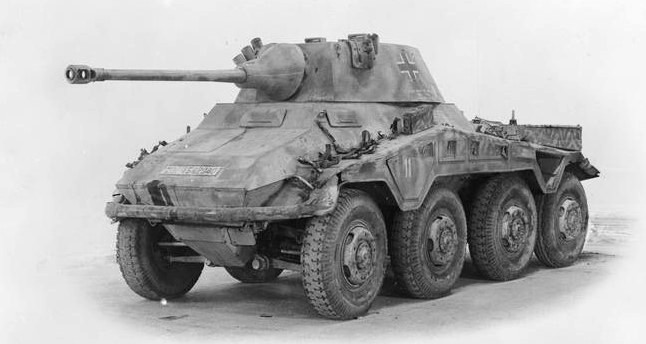
- Wartime view of a Sd.Kfz. 234/2
- Type: Armoured car
- Place of origin: Nazi Germany

Production history
- Produced: 1943–1945
- No. built: 478 (all types)

Specifications
- Mass: 10,500 kg (23,100 lb)
- Length: 6.02 metres (19 feet 9 inches)
- Width: 2.36 metres (7 feet 9 inches)
- Height: 2.10 metres (6 feet 11 inches)
- Crew: 4
- Armour: 9–30 mm (0.35–1.18 in) rolled homogeneous armour
- Main armament: (234/1) 2 cm KwK 38 L/65; (234/2) 5 cm KwK 39 L/60; (234/3) 7.5 cm K 51 L/24; (234/4) 7.5 cm PaK 40 L/46
- Secondary armament: 7.92 mm MG 42 machine gun
- Engine: 14,825 cc (905 in^{3}) Tatra 103 V12 diesel 157 kW (211 hp)
- Suspension: Independent on each wheel
- Operational range: 1,000 km (620 mi) on-road; 600 km (370 mi) off-road.
- Maximum speed: 90 km/h (56 mph)

The Sd.Kfz. 234 (Sonderkraftfahrzeug 234, "Special Purpose Vehicle 234"), was a family of armoured cars designed and built in Germany during World War II. The vehicles were lightly armoured, armed with a 20, 50 or 75 mm main gun, and powered by a Tatra V12 diesel engine. The Sd.Kfz. 234 broadly resembles the appearance of Sd.Kfz. 231 (8 rad).

== Development ==
Armoured wheeled vehicles were developed early in Germany after the end of World War I, since they were not subject to the restrictions of the Versailles Treaty. The Sd.Kfz. 234 belonged to the ARK series (type designation of the chassis) and was the successor to the earlier Sd.Kfz. 231/232/233 (8-Rad), which belonged to the GS series.

The combat experience of fast-moving, hard-hitting wheeled reconnaissance vehicles during the Wehrmacht's early invasions of Poland and France impressed German military officials, but indicated some deficiencies in existing designs. A new armoured car project was thus undertaken in August 1940, incorporating several lessons from the Wehrmacht's own external operations. The latest Büssing-NAG Sd.Kfz. 232 variant, the Sd.Kfz. 234 was designed later that year. It was to have a monocoque chassis with eight wheels, and an air-cooled engine for use in North Africa.

Chassis were built by Büssing-NAG in Leipzig-Wahren, while armoured bodies were provided by Deutsche Edelstahlwerke of Krefeld and turrets by Daimler Benz in Berlin-Marienfelde and Schichau of Elbing, with engines from Ringhoffer-Tatra-Werke AG of Nesselsdorf.

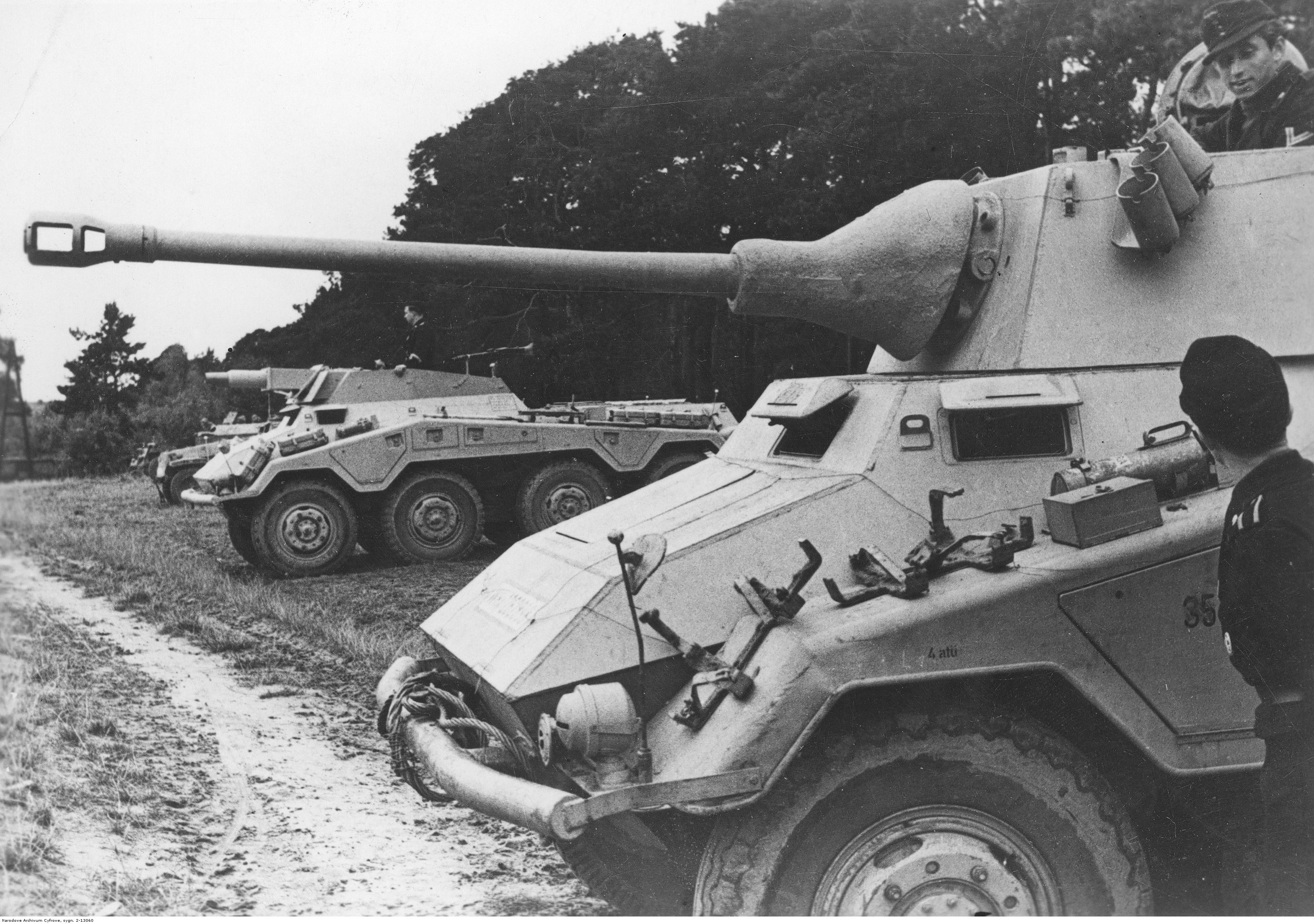
Two types of the heavily armed reconnaissance vehicles are seen in this 1944 photograph, the turreted Sd.Kfz 234/2 in the foreground and behind it—the open-topped Sd.Kfz 234/3 armed with a short-barrel howitzer.

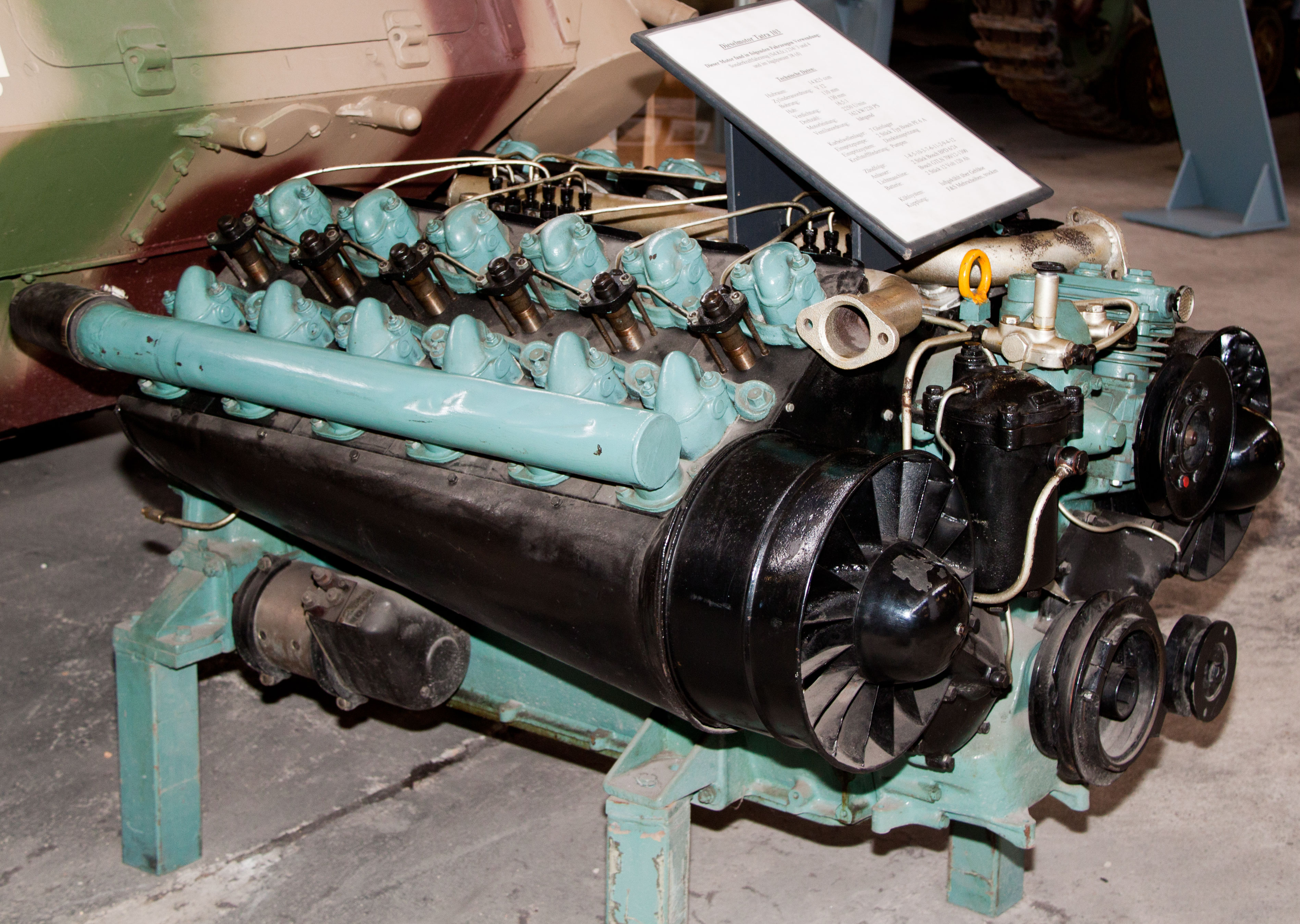
Tatra 103 engine, Panzermuseum Munster, Germany

The first trials with the prototype started around July, 1942. Due to problems with the excessive noise of the first engine, a second model was developed, the Tatra 103. The vehicle had eight-wheel steering and was able to quickly change direction thanks to a second, rear-facing, driver's seat; the transmission had six forward and reverse gears, with traction over the eight wheels. Power was provided by an air-cooled Tatra 103 diesel engine. The Sd.Kfz. 234 was the first and only German armoured vehicle to use an air cooled diesel engine. This was originally intended as a temporary solution until the engine could be redesigned to function better in harsher tropical climates, however, this never happened and thus the Tatra 103 was used until the end of production.

The first and possibly best known version was the Sd.Kfz. 234/2; it had a turret armed with a 5 cm L/60 gun, which was originally intended for the VK 1602 Leopard light tank. It was produced from late 1943 to mid 1944. This variant was replaced in production by the second version, the Sd.Kfz. 234/1, which had a simpler open turret (Hängelafette 38) armed with a 2 cm KwK 38 gun; it was manufactured from mid 1944 to early 1945.

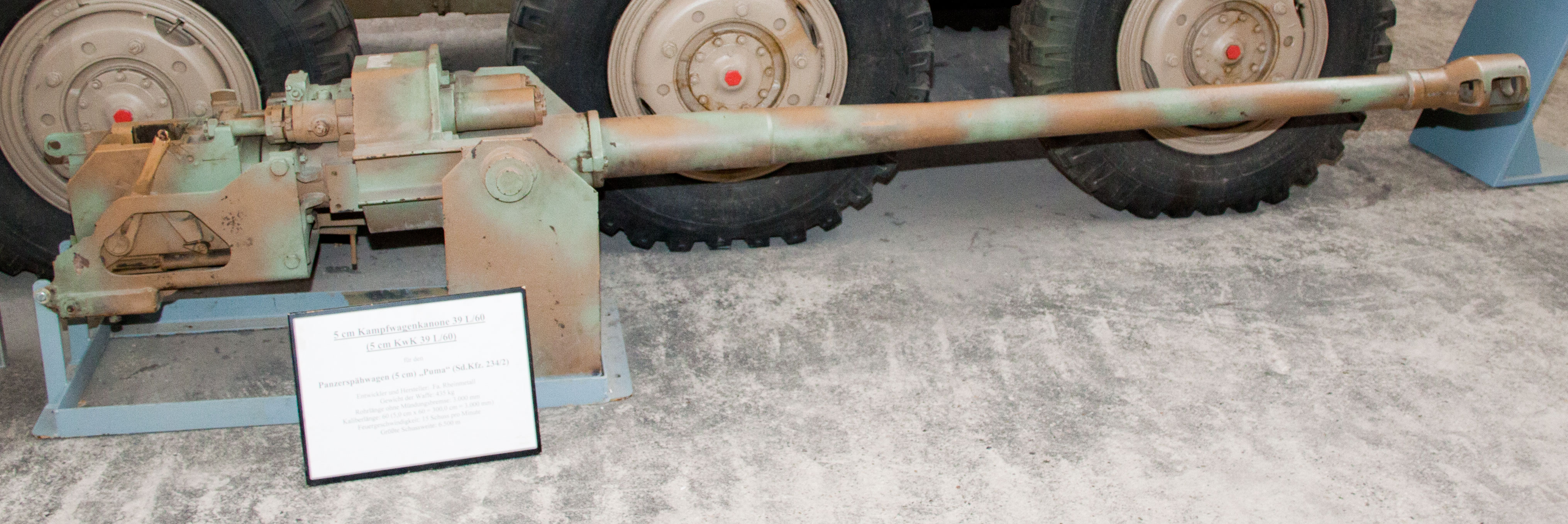
5 cm KwK 39/1 used in a Sd.Kfz. 234/2, Panzermuseum Munster

The Sd.Kfz. 234/3, produced simultaneously with the 234/1, served as a support vehicle for the reconnaissance vehicles. It had an open-topped superstructure, in which a short-barreled 7.5 cm K51 L/24 gun was installed. This gun was intended for use against "soft" targets; however, when using a hollow charge shell, the penetration power exceeded that of the 5 cm L/60 gun. This variant was produced from mid 1944 to the end of 1944, before switching production to the 234/4.

The final variant produced was the Sd.Kfz. 234/4, which replaced the L/24 gun with the 7.5 cm L/46 PaK 40. This was yet another attempt to increase the mobility of this anti-tank gun; however, the 234 chassis was stretched to its limits. This variant was manufactured from the end of 1944 to the end of hostilities in 1945.

== Service history ==
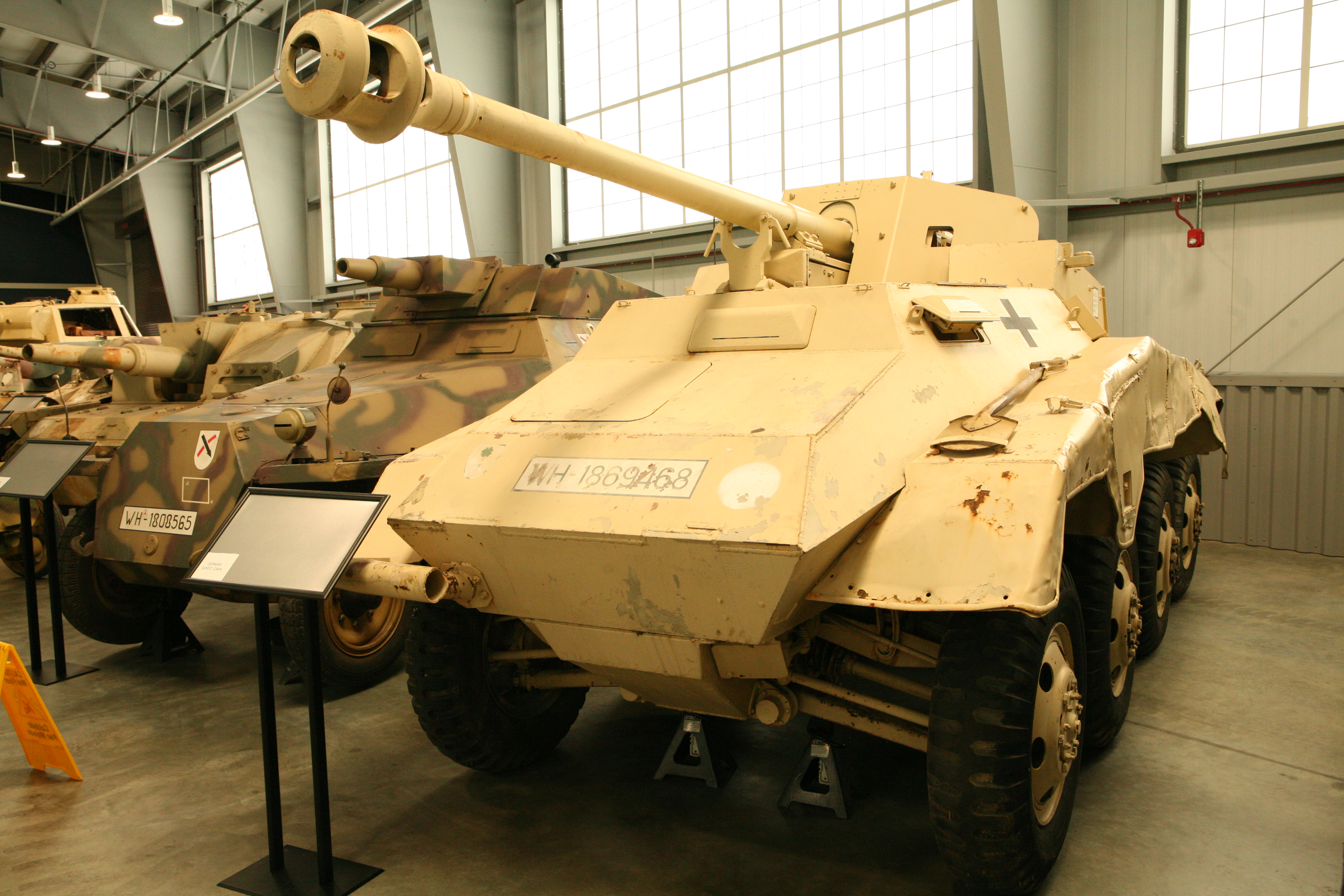
Sd.Kfz. 234/4 surrendered to the U.S. by the IV Panzer Corps in Czechoslovakia. Now at the U.S. Army Armor & Cavalry Collection.

Protracted engine development meant that the desert campaign was over before the 234 arrived, but it nevertheless proved useful on the Eastern and Western Fronts. It was quite formidable, but not many were built before it was replaced by the simpler 234/1, with a 20mm gun, in 1944. The Sd.Kfz. 234 was commonly used in pairs, one equipped with a long-range radio communications kit while the other possessed only a short-range radio. The long-range unit was identifiable by the large "star" antenna on the left side of the vehicle.

Some sources suggest that the Sd.Kfz. 234/2 was used by the following combat units:

- Panzer Lehr Division - 25 vehicles
- 2nd Panzer Division - 25 vehicles
- 1st SS Panzer Division - 16 vehicles
- 20th Panzer Division - 16 vehicles
- 7th Panzer Division - unconfirmed
- 13th Panzer Division - unconfirmed
- Brandenburg Panzer Grenadier Division - 2 issued January 1945

== Variants ==
Wartime view of a Sd.Kfz. 234/1

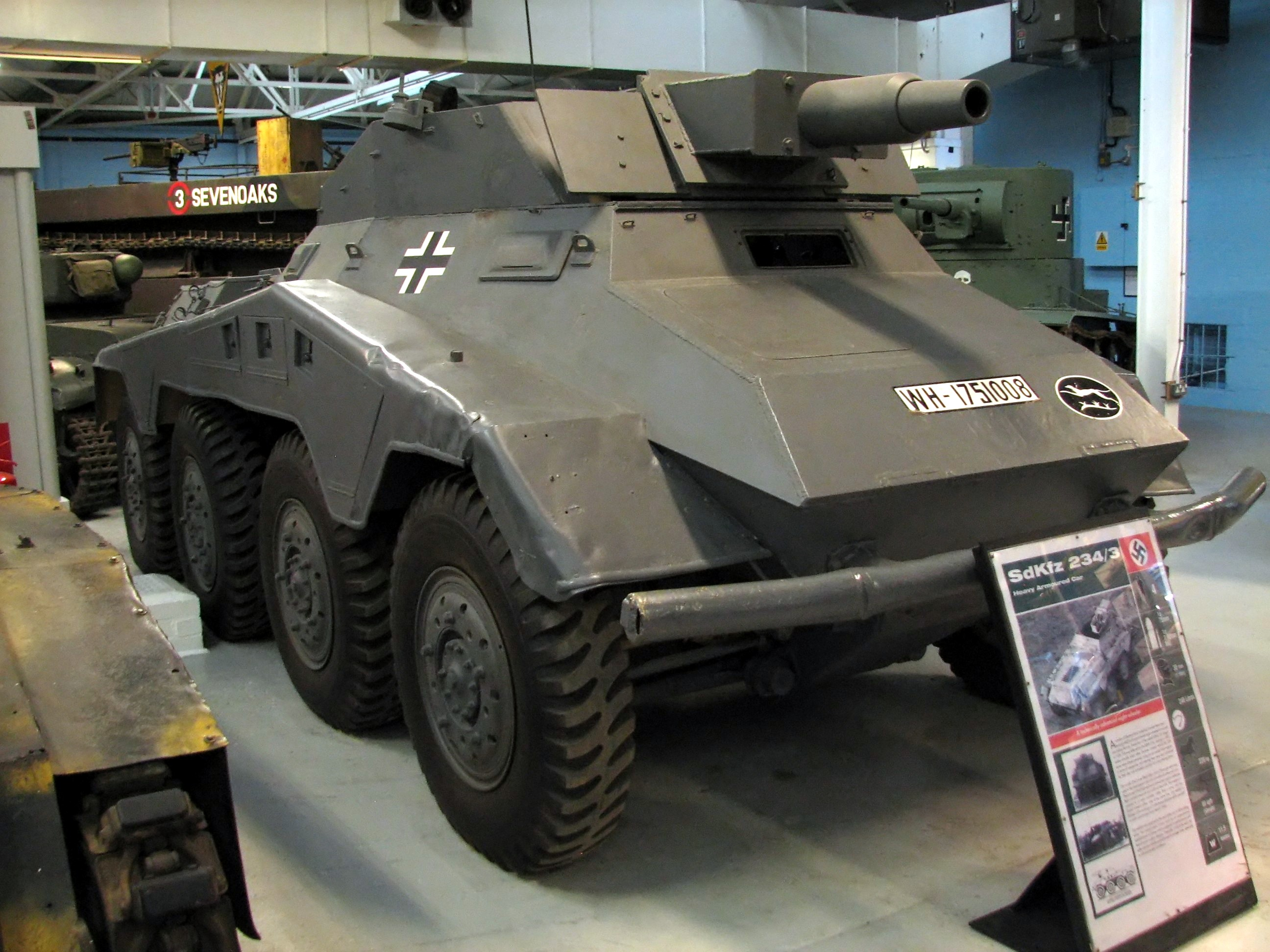
Sd.Kfz. 234/3, Bovington Tank Museum, UK

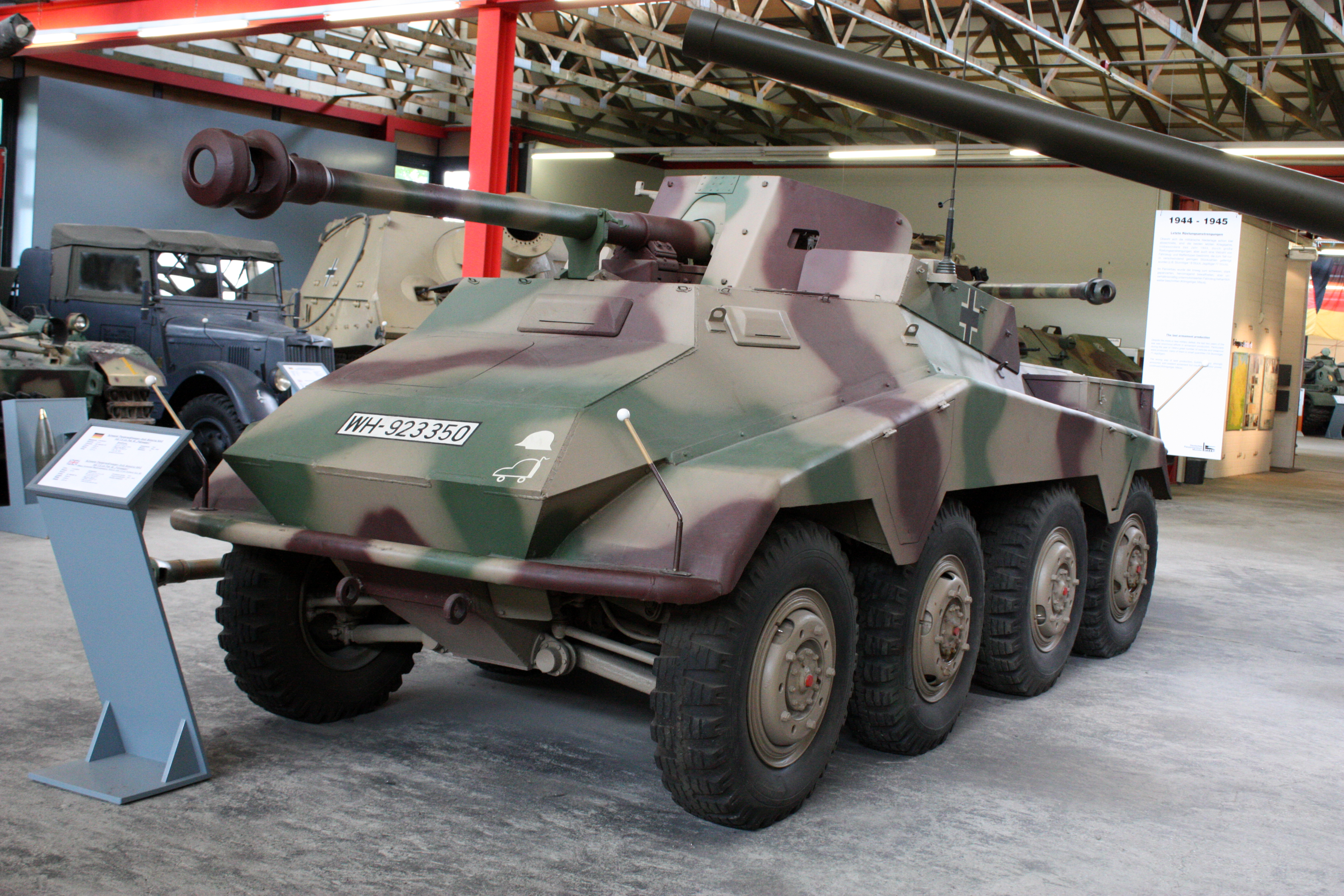
Sd.Kfz. 234/4 Pakwagen, Munster Panzermuseum, Germany

There were four main variants:

- Sd.Kfz. 234/1 – 1 x 2 cm KwK 38 autocannon with the longer L/65 Flakbarrel, 1 x 7.92mm MG 42 machine gun. This design featured an open-topped turret and a gun mount capable of +70 degrees elevation for air defence. Around 200 produced.
- Sd.Kfz. 234/2 – 1 x 5 cm KwK 39 L/60 gun, 1 x MG 42. Employed a fully enclosed turret originally designed for the VK 1602 Leopard light tank. The turret front was protected by 30 mm (1.2 in) armor at an angle of 20° from the vertical. The sides and rear had 10 mm armor set at 25°, and the top plate was 10 mm (0.39 in) armor. The gun mantlet was rounded and was 40 to 100 mm (1.6 to 3.9 in) thick. 101 built between September 1943 and September 1944.
- Sd.Kfz. 234/3 – 1 x 7.5 cm K51 L/24 gun in open-topped superstructure replacing the turret. 88 built between June and December 1944.
- Sd.Kfz. 234/4 – 1 x 7.5 cm PaK 40 anti-tank gun in open-topped superstructure replacing the turret. 89 built between December 1944 and March 1945.

== Sources ==
- Hogg, Ian V. Greenhill Armoured Fighting Vehicles Data Book, p. 221, "Sd.Kfz. 234/1", "Sd.Kfz. 234/2", "Sd.Kfz. 234/3", & "Sd.Kfz. 234/4". London: Greenhill Books, 2000. ISBN 1-85367-391-9.
- Hogg, Ian V., and Weeks, John. Illustrated Encyclopedia of Military Vehicles, p. 185, "Sd.Kfz. 232, 233, and 234 (8 rad) Armoured Cars". London: Hamlyn, 1980. ISBN 0-600-33195-4.
- "s. Pz. Sp. Wg. (5 cm) Sd. Kfz. 234/2: German 8-Wheeled Armored Car", Catalog of Enemy Ordnance, U.S. Office of Chief of Ordnance, p. 42, 1945, archived from the original on 2020-06-09 – via Lonesentry.com
