= 28/32 cm Nebelwerfer 41 =

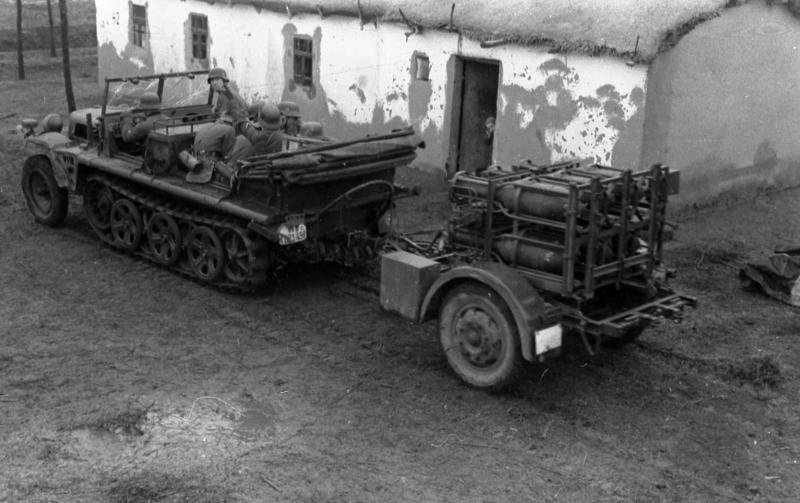
- A 28/32 cm Nebelwerfer 41 launcher towed by a Sd.Kfz. 10/1 half-track
- Type: Rocket artillery
- Place of origin: Nazi Germany

Service history
- In service: 1941–45
- Used by: Nazi Germany
- Wars: World War II

Production history
- Designed: late 1930s–1940
- No. built: 345

Specifications
- Mass: 1,130 kg (2,490 lb) (empty)
- Shell weight: 82 kg (181 lb) (28 cm); 79 kg (174 lb) (32 cm)
- Caliber: 28 cm (11 in); 32 cm (13 in)
- Barrels: 6
- Elevation: +13° 30' to +45°
- Traverse: 22° 30'
- Muzzle velocity: 145 m/s (480 ft/s)
- Maximum firing range: 1,925 m (2,105 yd) (28 cm); 2,200 m (2,400 yd) (32 cm)
- Filling: HE (28 cm) incendiary oil (32 cm)
- Filling weight: 50 kg (110 lb) (28 cm); 45 kg (99 lb) (32 cm)

The 28/32 cm Nebelwerfer 41 (28/32 cm NbW 41) was a German multiple rocket launcher used in the Second World War. It served with units of the so-called Nebeltruppen, the German equivalent of the U.S. Army's Chemical Corps. The Nebeltruppen had responsibility for poison gas and smoke weapons that were used instead to deliver high-explosives during the war. The name "Nebelwerfer" is best translated as "Smoke Mortar". It saw service from 1941 to 1945 in all theaters except Norway and the Balkans.

== Description ==
The 28/32 cm NbW 41 was a six-barrelled rocket launcher mounted on a two-wheeled carriage. Two stabilizer arms and a spade under the towing ring served to steady the carriage while firing. It used two different rockets. The open metal frames of the launcher were sized to fit the 32-centimetre (13 in) rocket, but adapter rails were provided to allow the 28-centimetre (11 in) rockets to fit. The 28 cm Wurfkörper Spreng (Explosive missile) rocket weighed 82 kilograms (181 lb) and had a 50-kilogram (110 lb) high-explosive warhead. The 32 cm Wurfkörper Flamm (Incendiary missile) was normally filled with 50 litres (13 US gal) (45-kilogram (99 lb)) of incendiary oil (Flammöl), but could carry poison gases or decontamination fluids. The oil could cover 200 square metres (2,200 sq ft) Both rockets were spin-stabilized and electrically fired. They had a prominent exhaust trail that kicked up a lot of debris, so the crew had to seek shelter before firing. This meant that they were easily located and had to displace quickly to avoid counter-battery fire. The rockets were fired one at a time, in a timed ripple, but the launcher had no capability to fire single rockets. Many launchers were converted from 1943 to use the new 30 cm Wurfkörper 42 rockets as the 30 cm Nebelwerfer 42.

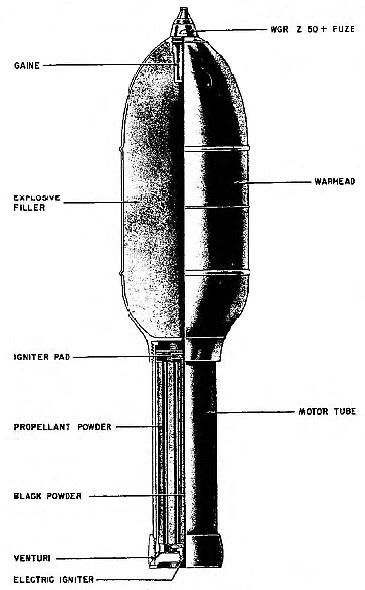
28 cm Wurfkörper Spreng

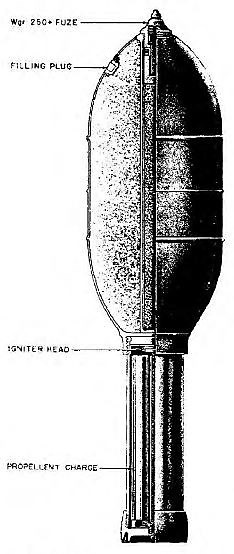
32 cm Wurfkörper Flamm

== Schweres Wurfgerät 40/41 ==
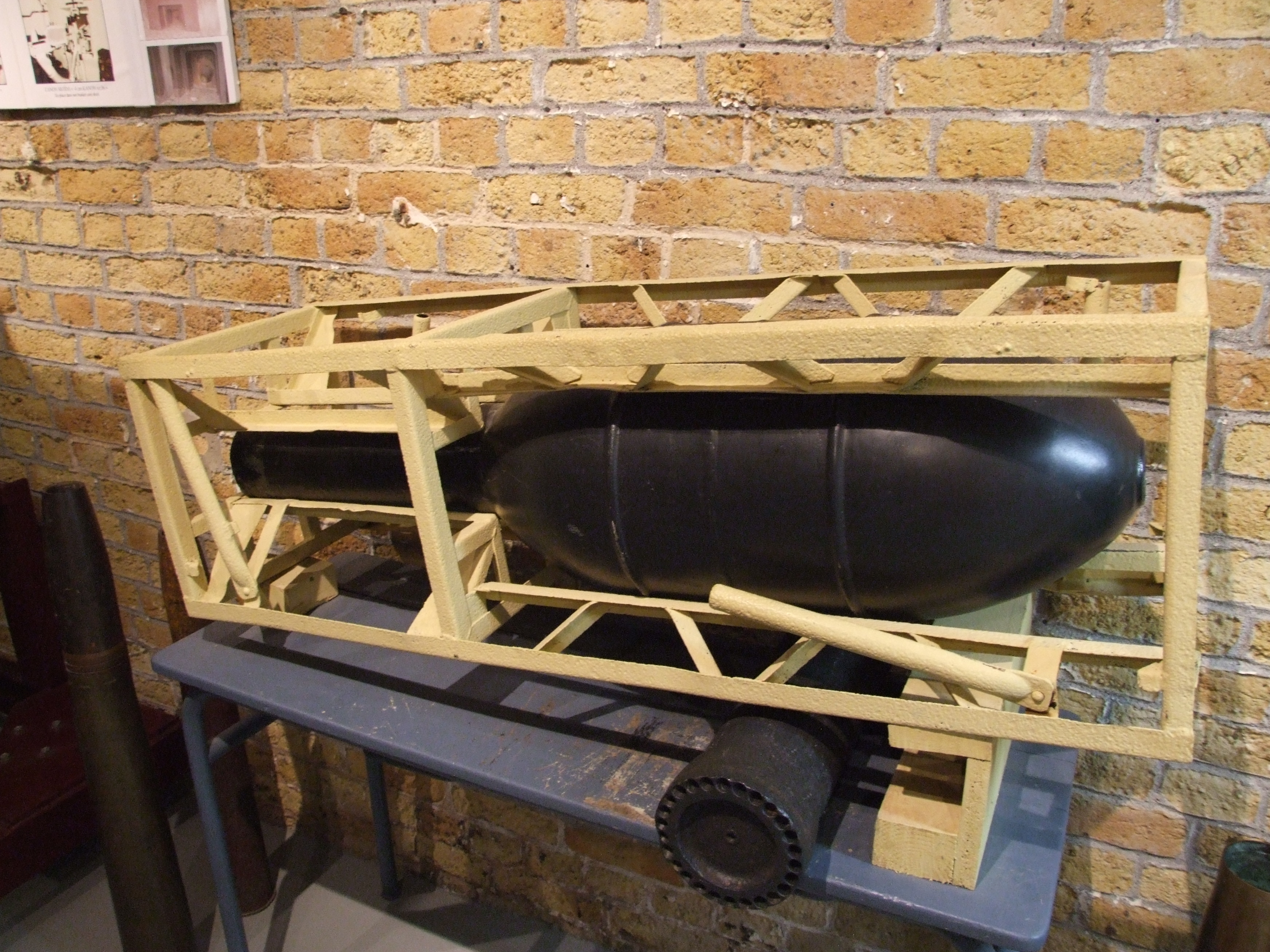
Schweres Wurfgerät 41, Mémorial du Souvenir, Dunkirk

The 28 and 32 cm rockets could also be fired from their packing cases (Packkiste) which had short hinged legs to adjust elevation. They could also be mounted in groups of four on wooden (schwere Wurfgerät 40 – heavy missile device) or tubular metal (schwere Wurfgerät 41 (sWG 41)) launch frames. The external dimensions of the packing cases were identical so no adapter was needed for the smaller rockets. The packing cases could also be mounted on schwere Wurfrahmen 40 frames attached to the sides of Sd.Kfz. 251/1 half-track armored personnel carrier or various captured French tracked vehicles. The schwere Wurfrahmen 40 was nicknamed the Stuka-zu-Fuß (Stuka on foot).

=== SWG 40 in action ===
A sequence showing sWG 40 launchers being used against Warsaw, during the Warsaw Uprising in 1944.

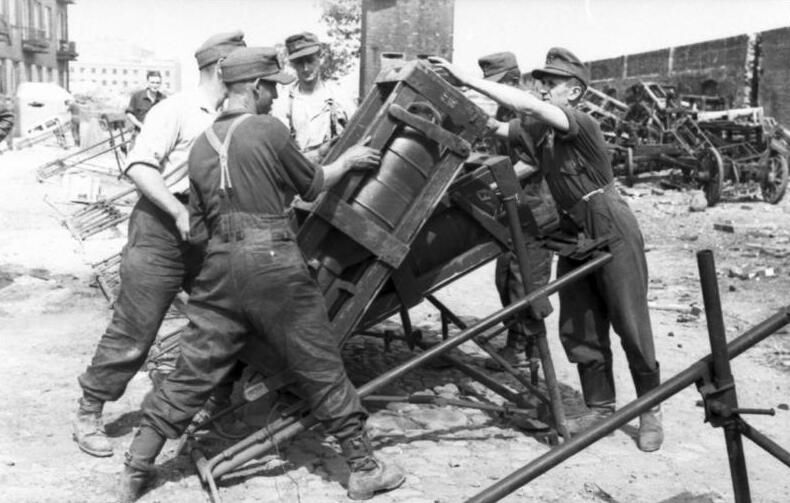
Positioning a rocket in a sWG 40 firing frame

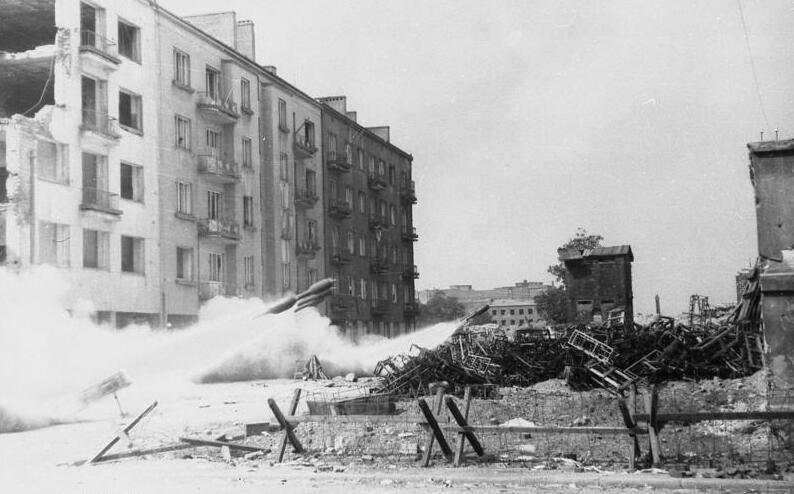
The rockets have just been fired; note the piles of used packing crates.

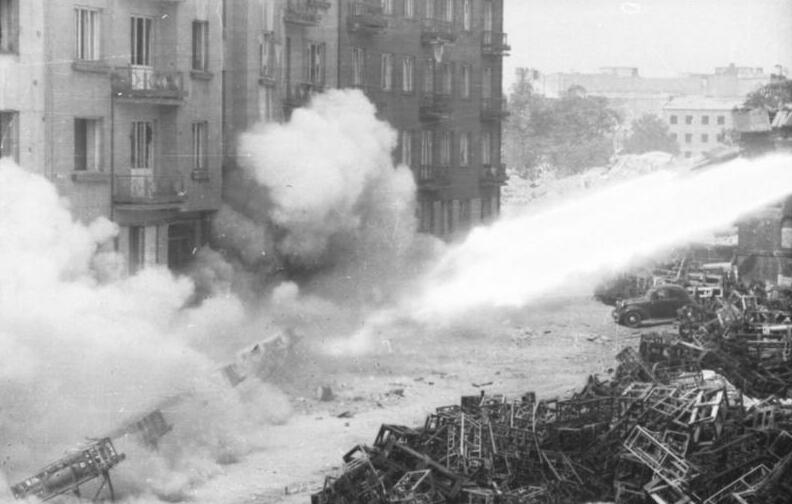
Not all the rockets have been fired at the same time.

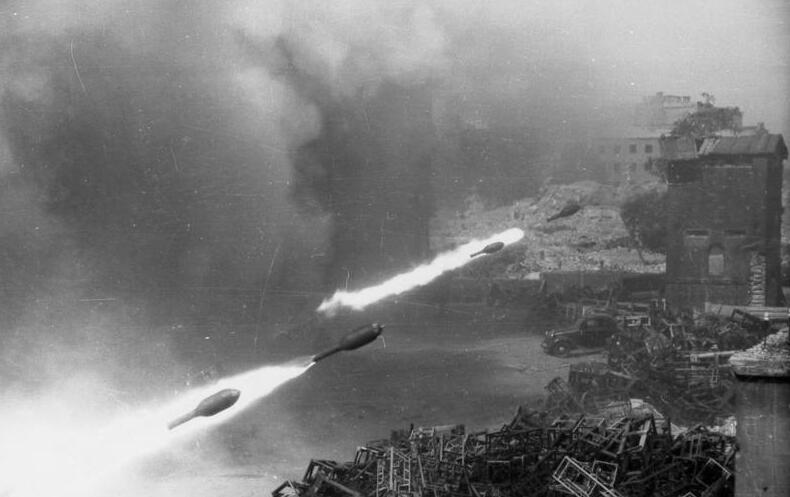
Four rockets in flight

== Organization and use ==
The 28/32 cm NbW 41 was organized into batteries of six launchers with three batteries per battalion. These battalions were concentrated in independent Werfer-Regimenter and Brigaden. The rockets in their packing cases could be used by units ranging from mechanized infantry (Panzergrenadier) to engineers to positional rocket regiments (Stellungs-Werfer-Regimenter). The first units were organized after the Battle of France in 1940 and they saw service on the Eastern Front, Italian Campaign and the defense of France and Germany from 1940 to 1945.

== See also ==
Rocket U-boat – attempt to mount these rockets on submarines

== Comparable ==
- Katyusha rocket launcher
- Mattress (rocket)
