= 30 cm Raketenwerfer 56 =

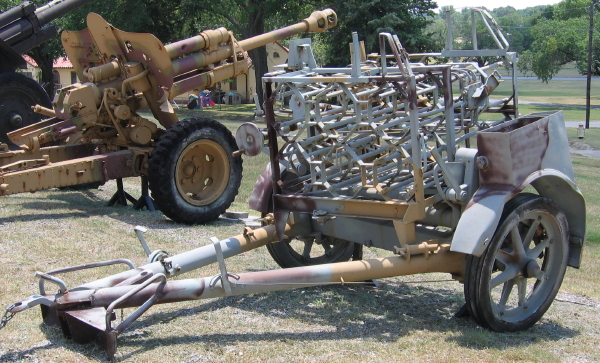
- A battered Raketenwerfer 56 launcher at the U.S. Army Field Artillery Museum, Ft. Sill, OK
- Type: Rocket artillery
- Place of origin: Nazi Germany

Service history
- In service: 1944–45
- Used by: Nazi Germany
- Wars: World War II

Production history
- Designed: 1942–44
- No. built: 694

Specifications
- Mass: 1,004 kilograms (2,213 lb) (empty)
- Shell weight: 127 kilograms (280 lb)
- Caliber: 301 millimetres (11.9 in)
- Barrels: 6
- Elevation: -3° to +45°
- Traverse: 22° 30'
- Muzzle velocity: 230 metres per second (750 ft/s)
- Maximum firing range: 4,550 metres (4,980 yd)
- Filling: HE
- Filling weight: 45 kilograms (99 lb)

The 30 cm Raketenwerfer 56 was a German multiple rocket launcher used in the Second World War. It served with units of the Nebeltruppen, the German equivalent of the U.S. Army's Chemical Corps. Just as the Chemical Corps had responsibility for poison gas and smoke weapons that were used instead to deliver high-explosives during the war so did the Nebeltruppen. The name "Nebelwerfer" is best translated as "Smoke Mortar". 694 saw service from 1944 to 1945 in all theaters except Norway.

== Description ==
The 30 cm Raketenwerfer 56 was a six-barreled rocket launcher mounted on the carriage of the 5 cm PaK 38 anti-tank gun. Its 30 cm Wurfkörper 42 Spreng (Explosive missile) rocket was spin-stabilized and electrically fired. The rockets had a prominent exhaust trail that kicked up a lot of debris, so the crew had to seek shelter before firing. This meant that they were easily located and had to displace quickly to avoid counter-battery fire. The rockets were fired one at a time, in a timed ripple, but the launcher had no capability to fire single rockets. 15 cm Wurfgranate 41 rockets could be fired using liner rails. When not in use the rails were strapped to the top of the launcher.

The same rocket was used in the 30 cm Nebelwerfer 42 launcher.

== Organization and use ==
The 30 cm Raketenwerfer 56 was organized into batteries of six launchers with three batteries per battalion. These battalions were concentrated in independent Werfer-Regiments and Brigades. It saw service on the Eastern Front, Italian Campaign and the defense of France and Germany from 1944 to 1945.

== See also ==
- 30 cm Nebelwerfer 42
