= Hit-and-run tactics =

Military doctrine of evasive attacks

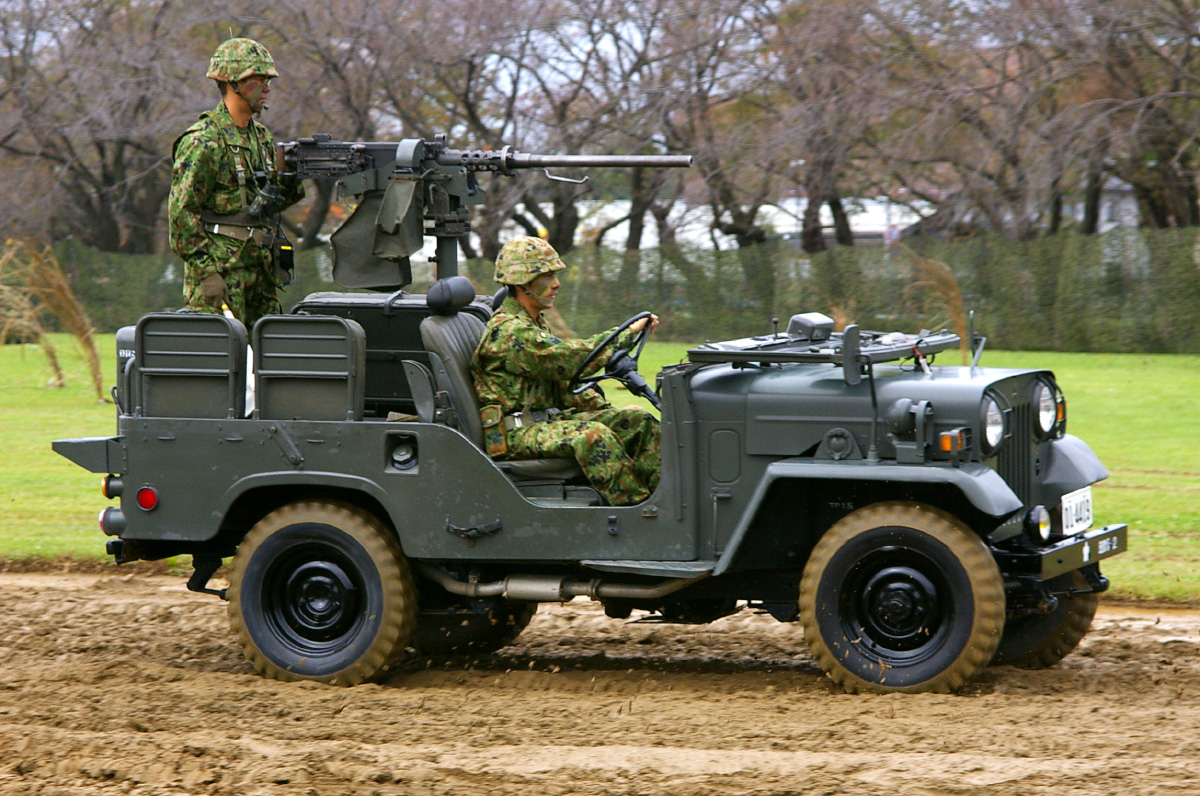
A Japan Ground Self-Defense Force military light truck armed with a heavy machine gun for anti-personnel harassment operations.

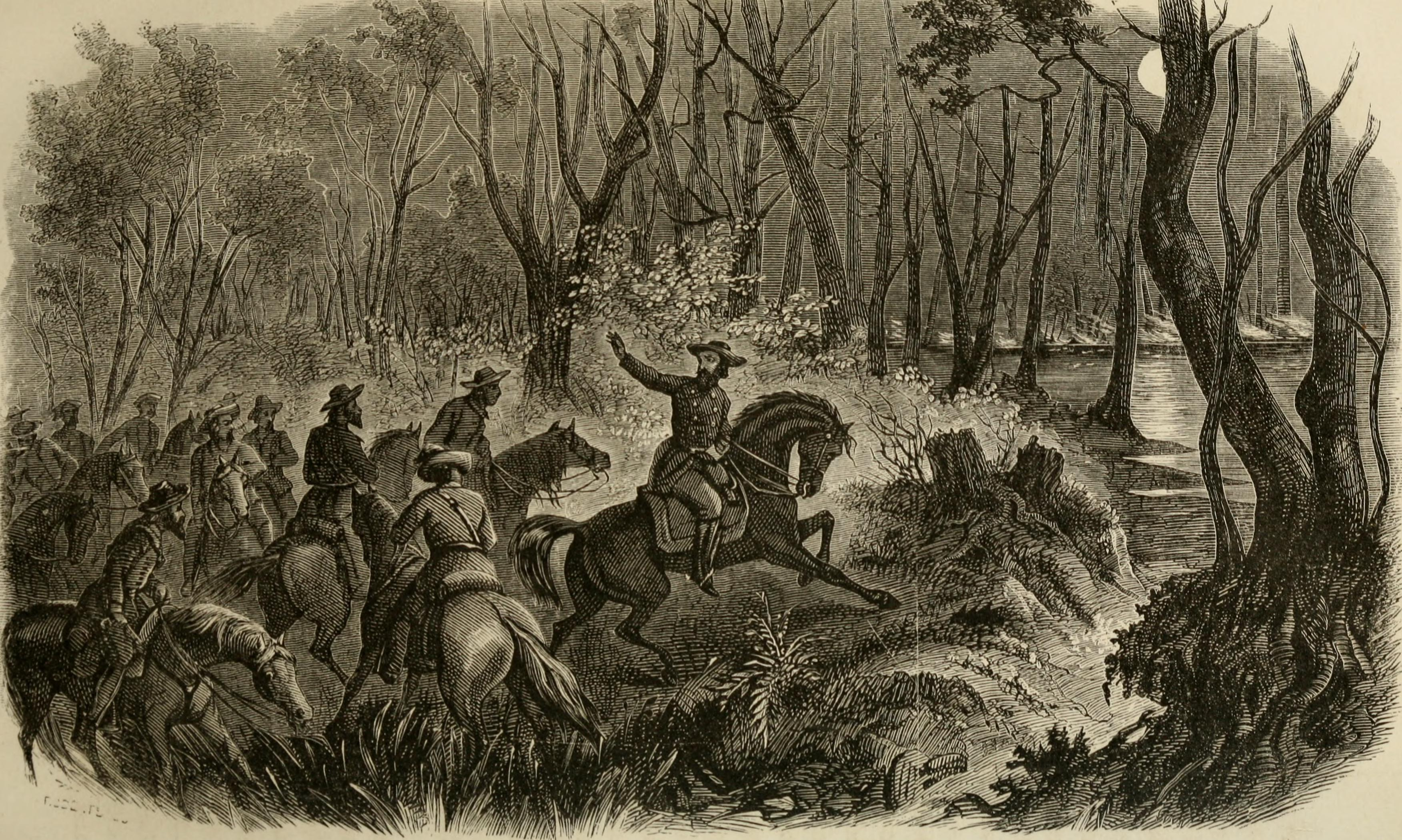
J. E. B. Stuart's cavalry performed a series of raids around George McClellan's army in the Seven Days Battles by using hit-and-run tactics.

Hit-and-run tactics are a tactical doctrine of using short surprise attacks, withdrawing before the enemy can respond in force, and constantly maneuvering to avoid full engagement with the enemy. The purpose is not to decisively defeat the enemy or capture territory but to weaken enemy forces over time through raids, harassment, and skirmishing and limiting risk to friendly forces. Such tactics can also expose enemy defensive weaknesses and achieve a psychological effect on the enemy's morale.

Hit-and-run is a favored tactic where the enemy overmatches the attacking force and any sustained combat is to be avoided, such as guerrilla warfare, militant resistance movements, and terrorism. However, regular army forces often employ hit-and-run tactics in the short term, usually in preparation for a later full-scale engagement with the enemy when and where conditions are more favorable. Examples of the latter include commando or other special forces attacks, reconnaissance-in-force, or sorties from a fortress, castle, or other strongpoint. Hit-and-run tactics were also used by the lightly armed horse archers, typical of the Eurasian steppe peoples, who excelled at them. That holds especially true for such troops that were not part of a large army (such as scouting parties), but it was common to see them employed in such a way even as part of a major force.

== Historical use ==
Romans first encountered that tactic in the Lusitanian War in which Lusitanians used the tactic called concursare ("bustling"). It involved charging forwards against the enemy lines, only to retreat after a brief clash or without clashing, which would be followed by more attacks in a similar cadence. The Lusitanians drove the Roman armies to break formation and chase them, leading them to traps and ambushes.

The Seljuk victory over the Byzantine Empire at the Battle of Manzikert was preceded by hit-and-run attacks of Seljuk cavalry, which threw the Byzantine army into confusion and proved fatal once it started to retreat. Similarly, the earlier Parthian and Sassanid Persian horse archers paved the way for their cataphracts' attack, which achieved the decisive victories at the Battle of Carrhae and Battle of Edessa. The use of hit-and-run tactics dates back even earlier to the nomadic Scythians of Central Asia, who used them against Darius the Great's Persian Achaemenid Empire and later against Alexander the Great's Macedonian Empire. The Turkish general Baibars also successfully used hit-and-run during the Battle of Ain Jalut, the first defeat of the quickly expanding Mongol Empire. Vastly outnumbered in North America, the French made effective use of hit-and-run raids during the various French and Indian Wars. In the Turkish War of Independence, the Turks fought against the Greeks by hit-and-run tactics before a regular army was set up. Marathas under shivaji and his successors also resorted to hit and run tactics against Mughal Empire.

During the Vietnam War, Viet Cong forces used hit-and-run tactics to great effectiveness against U.S. military forces. The tactic was also used in Afghanistan by rebel forces during the Soviet–Afghan War. Various Iraqi insurgent groups have also used hit-and-run tactics against Iraqi Security Forces and American-led coalition forces in Iraq. Improvised fighting vehicles, called "technicals", are often used in such operations.

== See also ==
- Reconnaissance-in-force
- Parthian shot
- Chevauchée
- Shoot-and-scoot
- Fire and movement
- Demoralization (warfare)
- List of military tactics
- Drive-by shooting
- Feigned retreat
