= 30 cm Wurfkörper 42 Spreng =

Unguided spin-stabilized artillery rocket

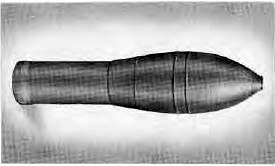
- A 30 cm Wurfkörper 42 Spreng projectile.
- Type: Unguided spin-stabilized artillery rocket
- Place of origin: Nazi Germany

Service history
- Used by: Wehrmacht
- Wars: World War II

Production history
- Produced: 1943-45

Specifications
- Mass: Overall: 127 kg (280 lb); Motor: 60 kg (132 lb); Warhead: 67 kg (148 lb)
- Length: Overall: 1.19 m (3 ft 11 in); Motor: 0.53 m (1 ft 9 in); Body: 0.66 m (2 ft 2 in)
- Width: 30 cm (12 in)
- Warhead: TNT; Incendiary
- Detonation mechanism: Nose fuzed
- Engine: Solid-fuel rocket
- Operational range: 4.5 km (2.8 mi)
- Maximum speed: 230 m/s (754 ft/s)
- Guidance system: None

The 30 cm Wurfkörper 42 Spreng was an unguided spin-stabilized artillery rocket developed by Germany and used by the Wehrmacht during World War II.

== Design ==
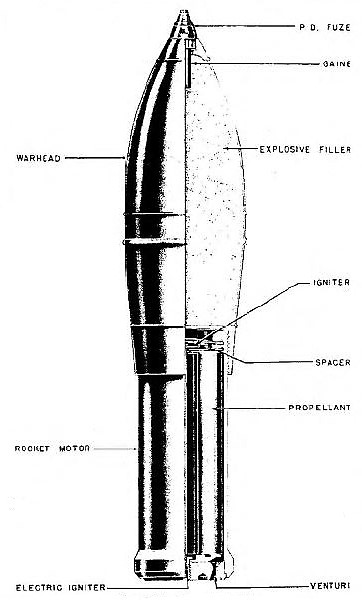
30 cm Wurfkörper 42 Spreng.

The 30 cm Wurfkörper 42 Spreng was conceptually similar to earlier rockets such as the 15 cm Wurfgranate 41 Spreng, 21 cm Wurfgranate 42 Spreng, 28 cm Wurfkörper 42 Spreng, and 32 cm Wurfkörper M F1 50. The rocket was fired electrically and the main difference was the 30 cm Wurfkörper had a higher payload to weight ratio, better aerodynamic efficiency, and its launch signature was smaller than earlier rockets. Since the new rocket produced less smoke and flame than earlier rockets it improved crew survivability by reducing their susceptibility to counter-battery fire.

The warhead of the 30 cm Wurfkörper 42 Spreng was ovoid in shape and internally threaded for a nose fuze and filled with either TNT or incendiary mixture. The motor section consists of a threaded tubular section which screws into the warhead. The tail of the tube was threaded and a circular plate with eighteen venturis screwed into the tube. The venturis were drilled at a 12° 42' angle and the exhaust gasses spin stabilized the projectile. The motor was composed of seven sticks of solid-rocket fuel composed of nitrocellulose and diglycol dinitrate weighing 15 kg (33 lb) which was suspended from an internal grid. The center stick contains a length of quick match in a celluloid tube and ignites the six outer propellant sticks. The motor is essentially a scaled up 15 cm Wurfgranate 41.

== Deployment ==
There were a number of different launch platforms for the 30 cm Wurfkörper including:

- Wurfrahmen 40 - The simplest launcher was the Wurframen which was a wooden packing crate with short legs at the front that allowed the frame to be elevated and fired. A number of frames could also be stacked on wood or metal scaffolds and fired in succession. These crates could also be attached to half-tracks and tanks to be used as self-propelled artillery. Warships and even submarines were considered as launch vehicles.
- 30 cm Nebelwerfer 42 - The Nebelwerfer 42 was a simple six-barrelled multiple rocket launcher which consisted of a tubular steel frame mounted on a two-wheeled carriage.
- 30 cm Raketenwerfer 56 - The Raketenwerfer 56 was a simple six-barrelled multiple-rocket launcher which consisted of a tubular steel frame mounted on a two-wheeled carriage which replaced the earlier Nebelwerfer 42.

== Photo Gallery ==
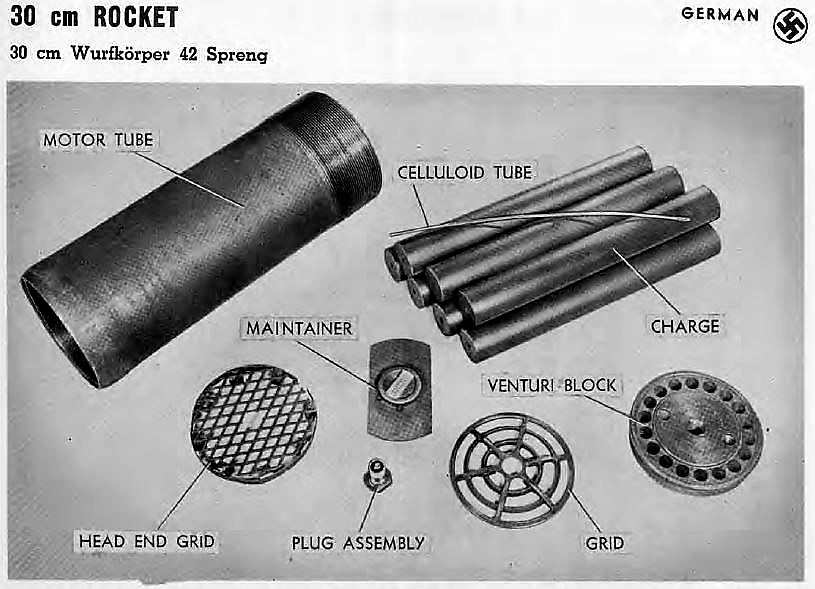
A schematic motor components.

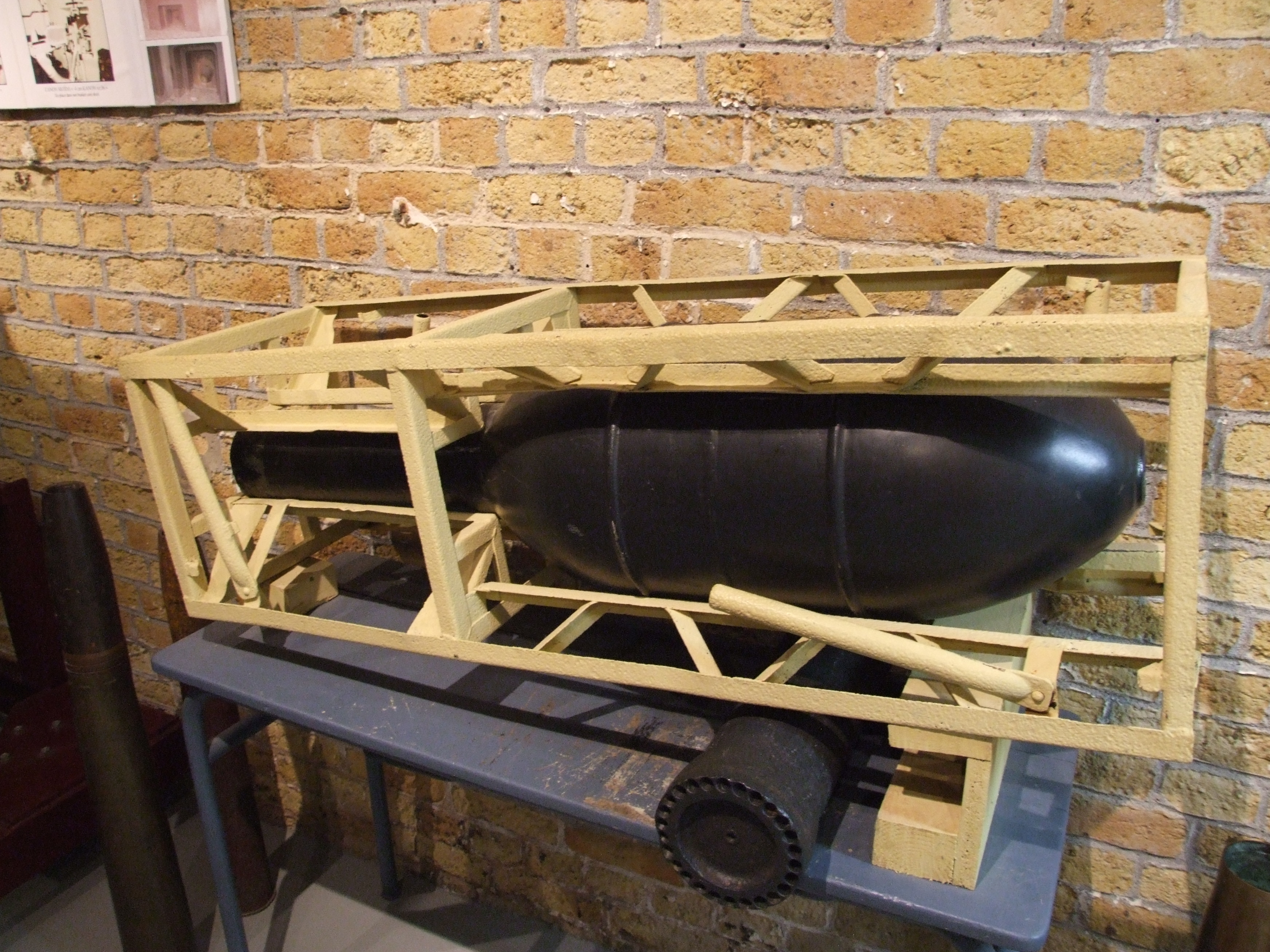
The 30 cm Wurfkörper used a similar crate as this 32 cm rocket.

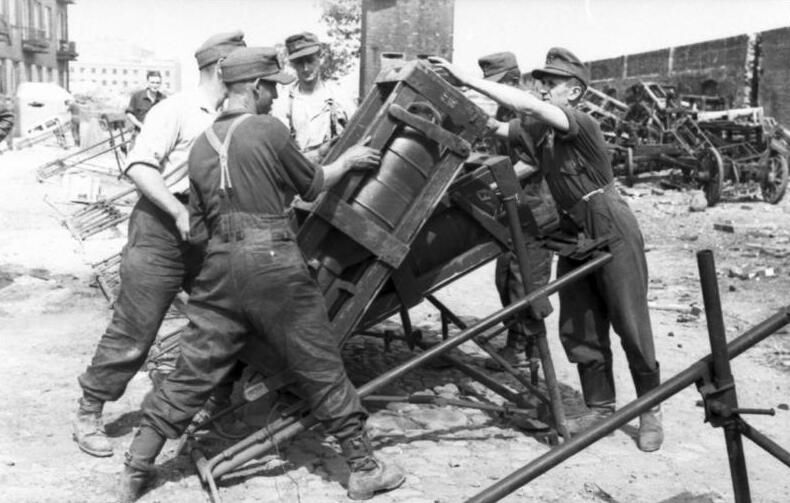
Multiple frames could be fired from scaffolds like these.

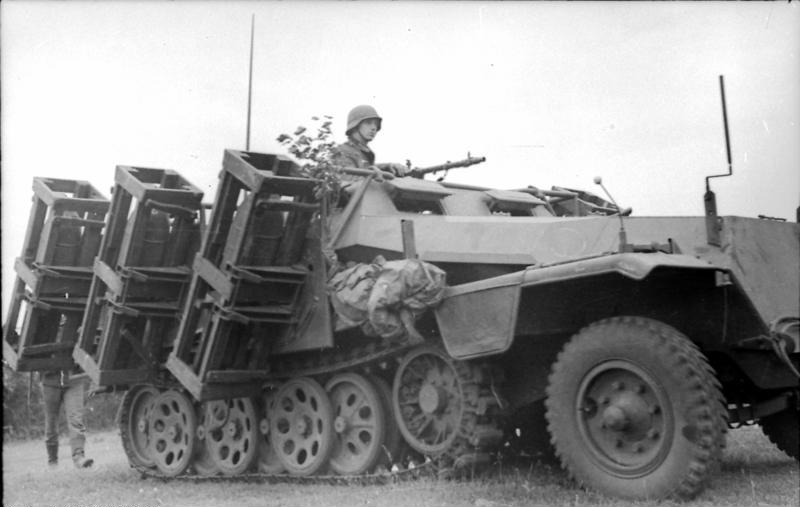
Multiple frames could also be fitted to a variety of vehicles.

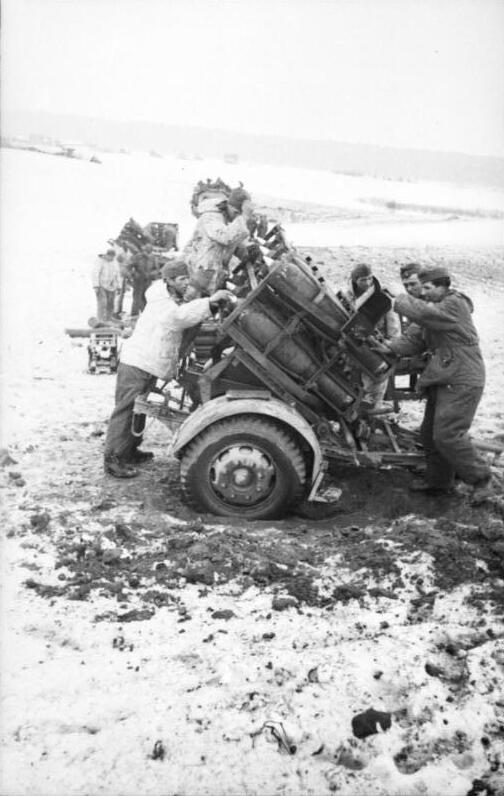
A six-barrelled 30 cm Nebelwerfer 42 rocket launcher.

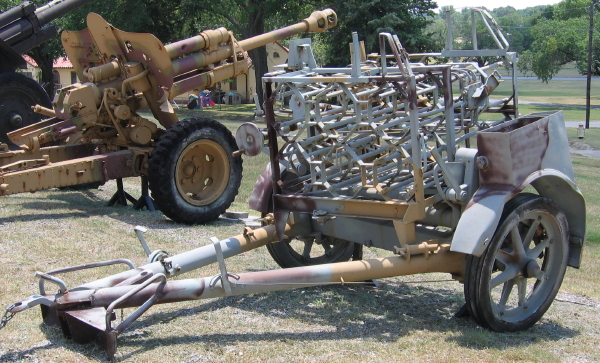
A six-barrelled 30 cm Raketenwerfer 56 rocket launcher.
