= Renault UE Chenillette =

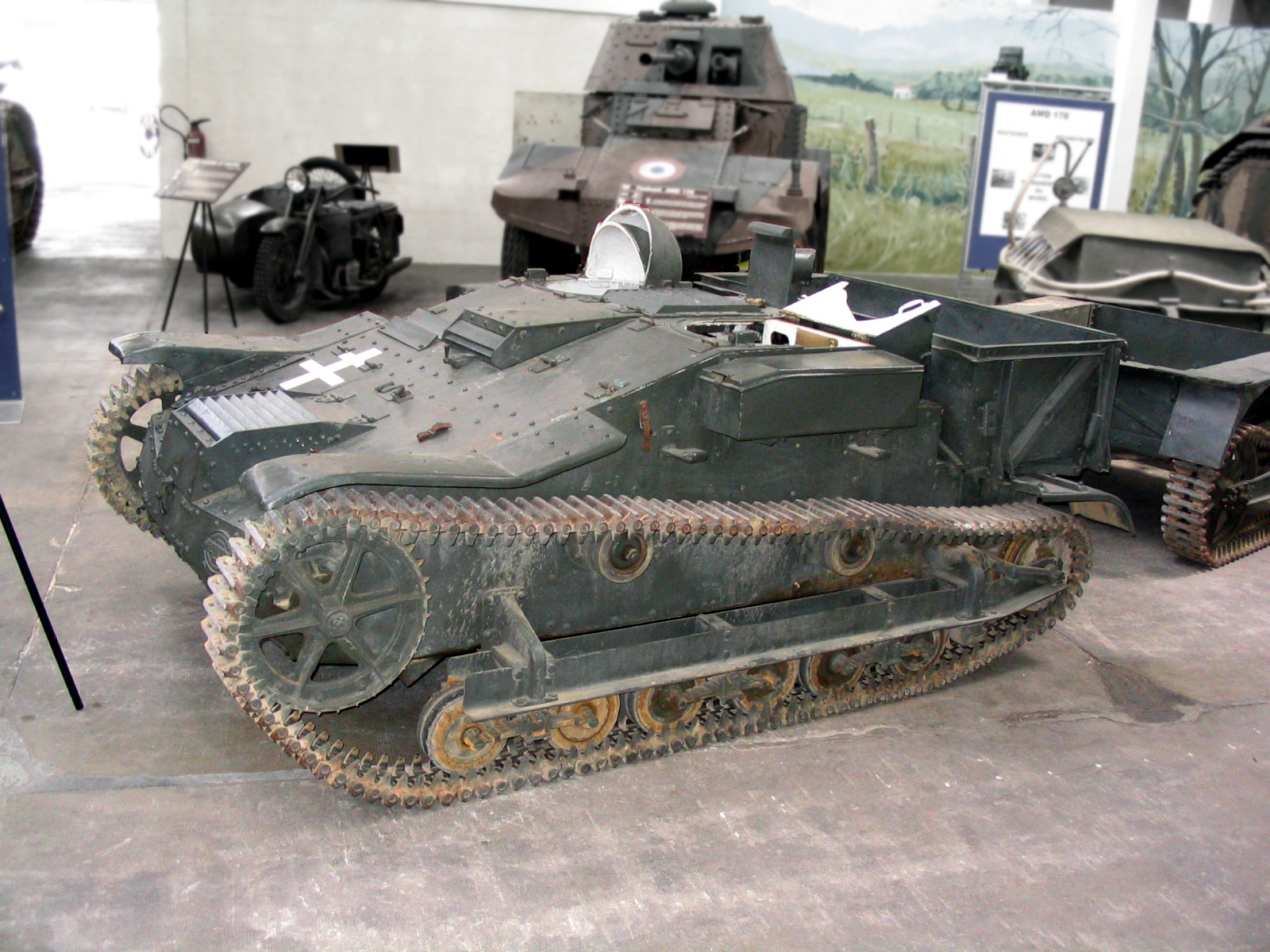
- Preserved UE 2 at the Musée des Blindés.
- Type: Prime mover
- Place of origin: France

Service history
- Used by: France; Nazi Germany; Thailand; Romania (Taiwan) Republic of China; Iron Guard; Italy (Polish government-in-exile) Poland

Production history
- Designer: Renault
- Manufacturer: Renault, AMX, Berliet, Fouga, Malaxa
- Produced: 1932 - March 1941
- No. built: 5,168 France, 126 Romania
- Variants: UE 2, Șeniletă Malaxa Tip UE

Specifications
- Mass: 2.64 t (5,800 lb)
- Length: 2.80 m (9 ft 2 in)
- Width: 1.74 m (5 ft 9 in)
- Height: 1.25 m (4 ft 1 in)
- Crew: two
- Armor: 9 mm (0.35 in)
- Main armament: 7.5 mm MAC for the last UE 2 production run
- Engine: Renault 85; 38 hp (28 kW)
- Payload capacity: 350 kg (770 lb) in cargo bin; 950 kg (2,090 lb) with trailer
- Suspension: leaf spring
- Ground clearance: 30 cm (12 in)
- Fuel capacity: 56 L (12 imp gal)
- Operational range: 100 km (62 mi)
- Maximum speed: 30 km/h (19 mph)

The Renault UE Chenillette is a light tracked armoured carrier and prime mover produced by France between 1932 and 1940.

In 1930, the Commission de Vincennes decided to develop a light armoured vehicle able to tow and supply small cannon and mortars. In 1931, the Renault company was given the contract for production of its Renault UE, combined with the Renault UK trailer. In 1937, from a number of competitors, the Renault UE2 was chosen as an improved type for large-scale production. Of both types combined, over five thousand were built, including licence production in Romania, and they were part of the standard equipment of all French infantry divisions. Most Renault UE vehicles in French service were unarmed; those captured by Germany in 1940 were used for a variety of purposes, including being armed with machine-guns, anti-tank guns and rocket artillery.

== Development ==
From 1922 onwards, it had been the policy of the French Infantry to mechanise as many units as possible. Budgetary restraints made it unrealistic to fully equip them with armoured personnel carriers; but the mass production of smaller armoured vehicles in the roles of munition and supply carrier and weapon carrier for machine guns and mortars seemed feasible. For some years, the decision to produce these types was delayed. But, when in 1929 an experiment with an automotive trailer guided by a walking soldier had completely failed, it was decided to develop a single vehicle for both missions. In the spring of 1930, several possibilities were considered, among them a standard 3.5-ton truck and the existing Citroën-Kégresse half-tracks. Brandt, an arms producer having no experience in vehicle development, had already started cooperation with the British Vickers company to build a weapon carrier for its Brandt Modèle 1927 mortar; it proposed producing the British Carden-Loyd Mark VI carrier under licence and presented a smaller and a larger vehicle, together with matching trailers, imported from Britain, for the supply and weapon carrier task respectively. On 24 July 1930, the Commission de Vincennes rejected the truck and half-tracks as being too heavy and opted for the smaller weapon carrier of the Vickers type after limited, though satisfactory, testing. On 7 October, development of such a vehicle under the name of Type N was decided upon. Orders for prototypes were placed in December 1930 with three companies: Renault, Citroën and Brandt. However, Renault indicated they had no intention to pay licence rights, unless the French state fully compensated them; the three companies were thus invited to build a "similar" vehicle, not an exact copy. The orders were for armoured tractors and matching tracked trailers and for a heavier trailer to carry the tractor itself, to be pulled by a truck while the smaller trailer trailed behind.

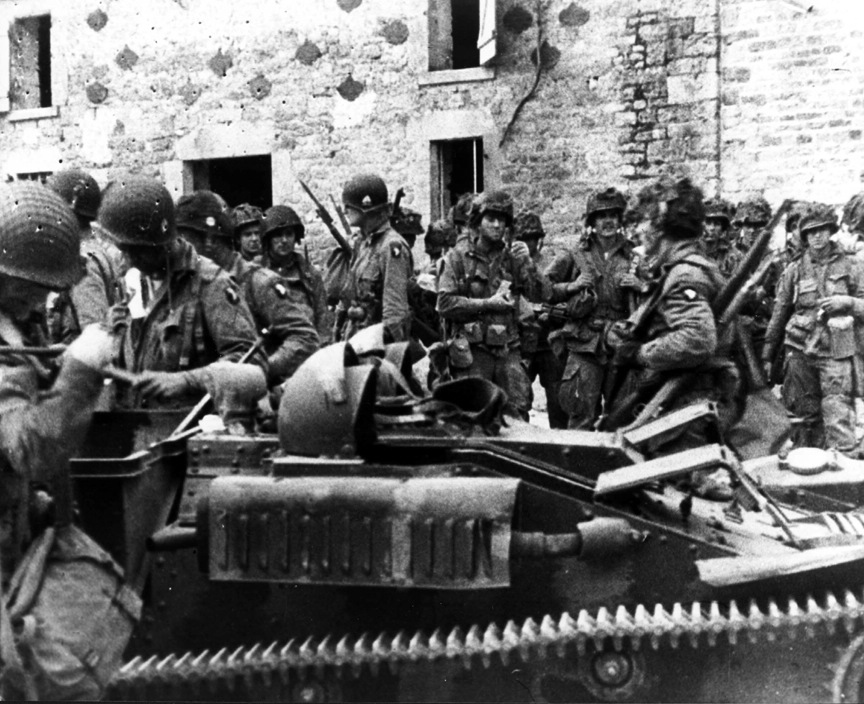
Soldiers of the US 101st Airborne Division with a captured Renault UE in Normandy, June 1944.

In the summer of 1931, the prototypes were ready for trials. Citroën had received orders for six tractor prototypes: three fully tracked vehicles and three of the half-track type. The first prototype to be ready, not at all resembling the Carden-Loyd carrier, was in the form of a very small half-track fitted with a Kégresse track and manned by only a driver protected by an armoured hood with vision slits, sitting on the left side of the vehicle, with the engine to his right. Only the nose of the vehicle was armoured. It was presented to the Commission de Vincennes on 24 July 1931 and tested until 29 July. The commission noted that the cooling system failed and that there was no possibility of decoupling the trailer from inside the driver's cabin. On 31 July, the other two half-tracks were delivered together with the first two trailers. The matériel was rejected as being too vulnerable. Citroën discontinued the development of the fully tracked vehicles but rebuilt one of the half-tracks prototypes into the prototype of the larger AMR Citroën Kégresse P 28 half-track, fifty of which would be built.

On 10 and 17 December 1930, Brandt had obtained an order for six complete sets: tractor, trailer and tractor-carrying trailer. To honour its commitments to Vickers, it let the trailers and one tractor be built in Britain. To conform to the requirement for production in France, Brandt delegated the task of building a new tractor type to the Latil company, as it had too little experience itself. The Latil prototype, presented on 7 August 1931, was very much along the lines of the British type and strongly resembled the later Universal Carrier: fully tracked and with most of the vehicle covered by an open rectangular superstructure to ensure as large a carrying capacity as possible. Only a small driver's and engine section at the front was armoured on top. On 17 July, the commission considered the type ready for troop trials.

The first prototype to be ready was that of Renault, that also had received orders for six sets. It was tested between 15 and 23 April 1930. Certain defects were found and remedied, after which the prototype was again tested from 3 June. A second prototype, fitted with a rubber track, was tested between 28 April and 12 May. This other track type was shown to be too weak. The project had as factory designation Renault UE, a chronological letter code without further meaning; the smaller trailer was the Renault UK. The Vickers suspension with double track guides was imitated. For Renault this new suspension type, that he patented despite its obvious Vickers ancestry, offered the solution for severe problems he had experienced trying to adapt his existing suspension models, using single track guides, to a high-speed vehicle without increasing the chance that the track would be thrown at higher speeds. Renault hoped to further develop the UE into a light tank by adding a turret; accordingly, the hull resembled a tank chassis rather than a dedicated supply vehicle.

In October 1931, the Conseil Consultatif de l'Armement, under strong pressure by the Infantry to reach a quick decision, chose the Renault vehicle for production, even though the trial process had not been completed. On 9 December, an order of fifty was made for the Chenillette de ravitaillement d'Infanterie Modèle 1931 R. On 26 March 1932, a preseries of fifty tractor-carrying trailers was ordered, the first was delivered in June. Further orders followed, mass-production commencing in the second half of 1934. The series vehicles differed from the first in having a towing sign plate fitted on the top, new towing hooks and an elongated stowage box on the left side. Orders reached a total of 793 on 1 January 1936 and of about 1,200 by June 1936 — 700 of which had been delivered by June 1936, 920 by October 1936, 976 on 1 January 1937. In December 1936, the military branch of Renault was nationalised as the AMX company, which continued production to a total of about 2,200, later joined by Berliet, which would build another 100, and Fouga, which would produce 300 for a grand total for the Modèle 31 of about 2,600.

== Description ==
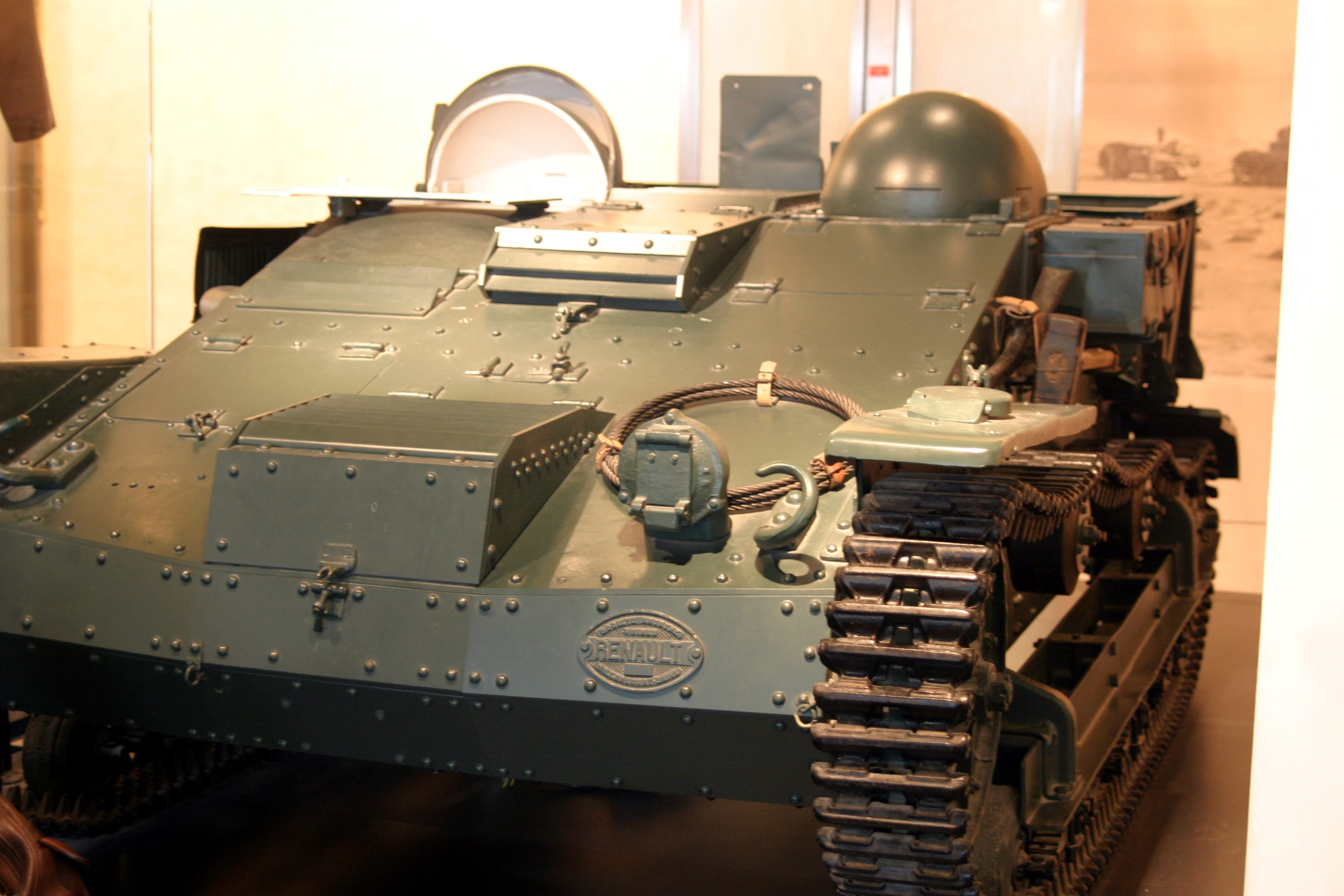
A Renault UE Chenillette de ravitaillement d'Infanterie Modèle 1931 R in the Musée de l'Armée in Paris. It has the straight mudguards, Restor lights and typical "pig-tail" hooks of the early production vehicles.

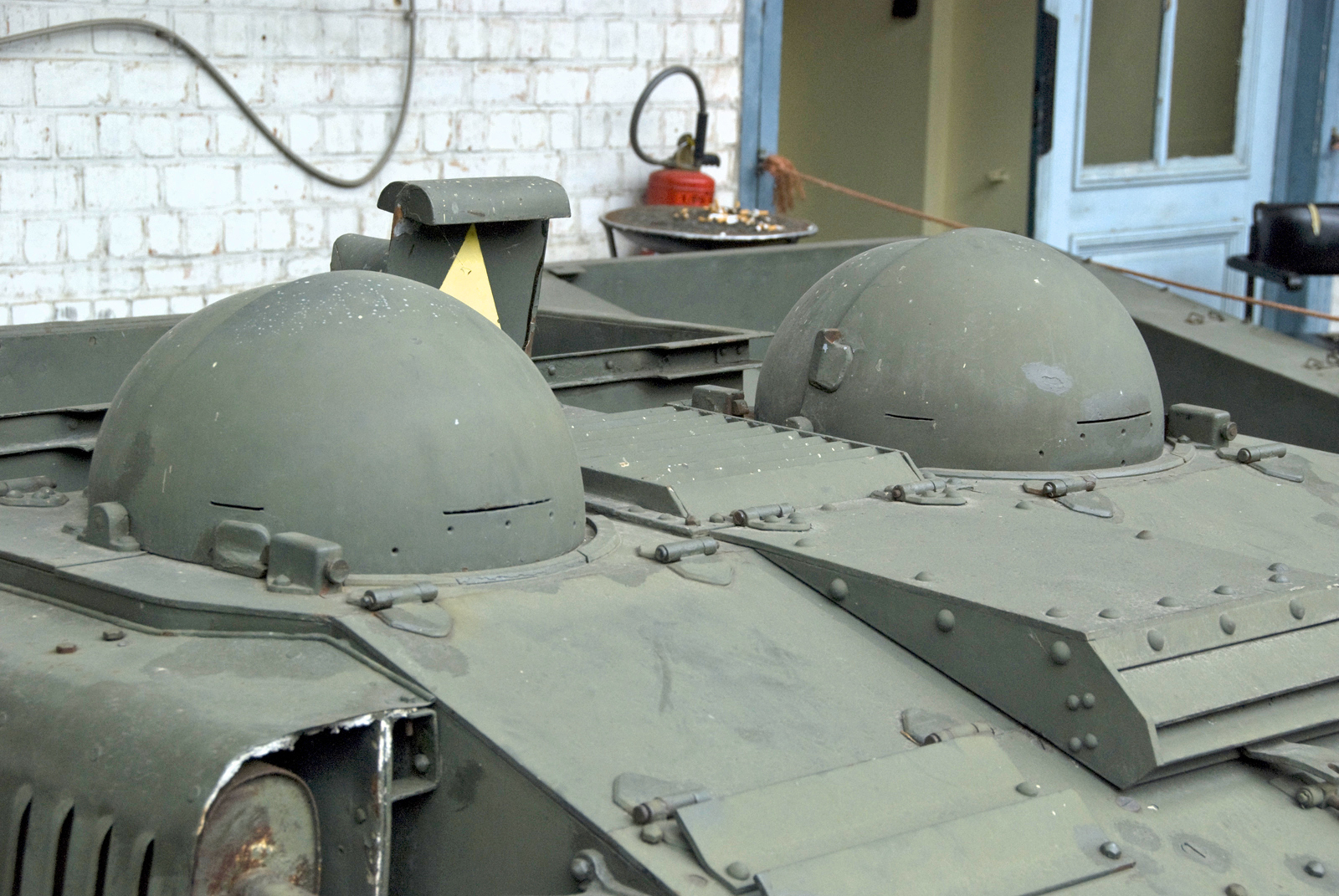
The calottes.

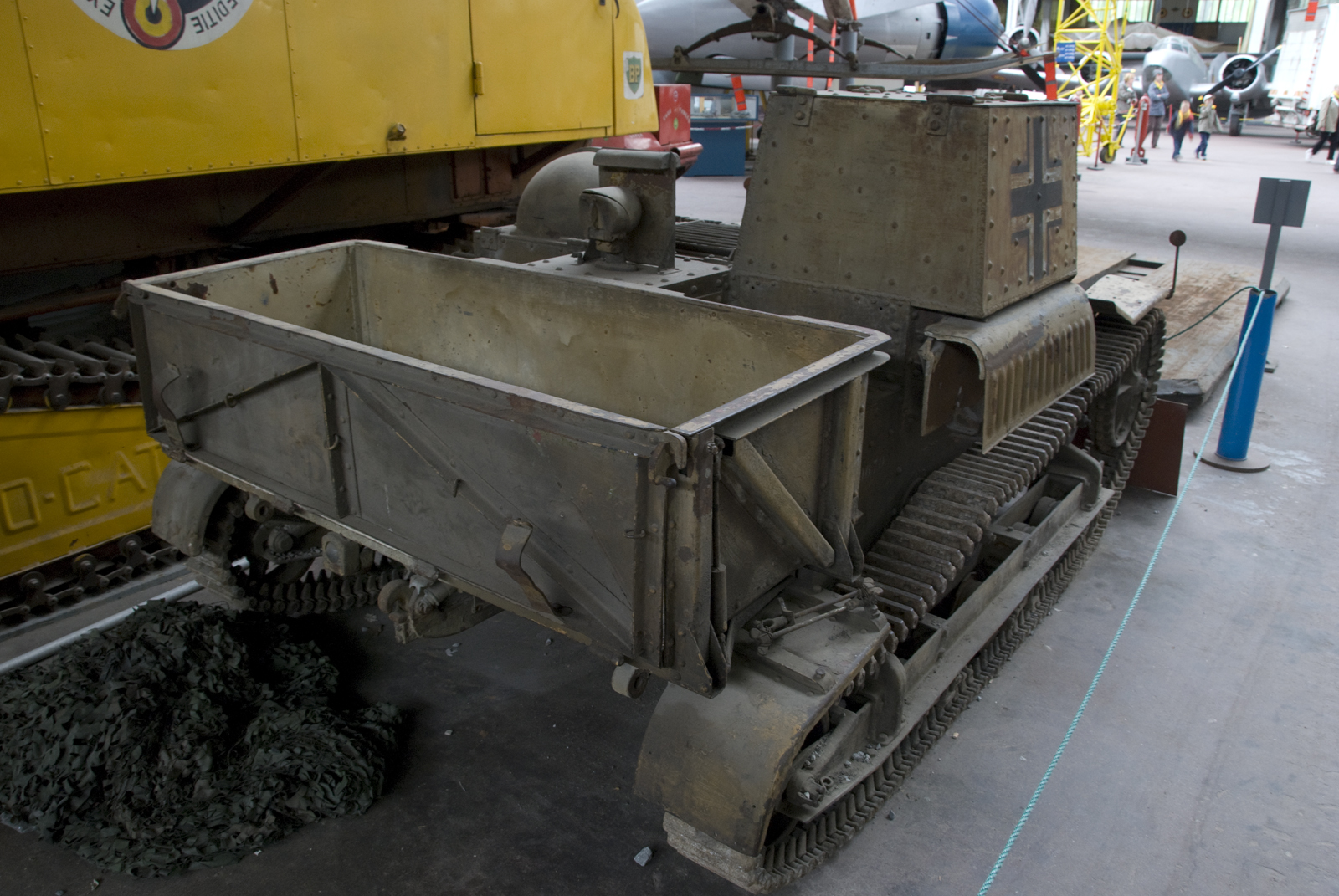
The bin.

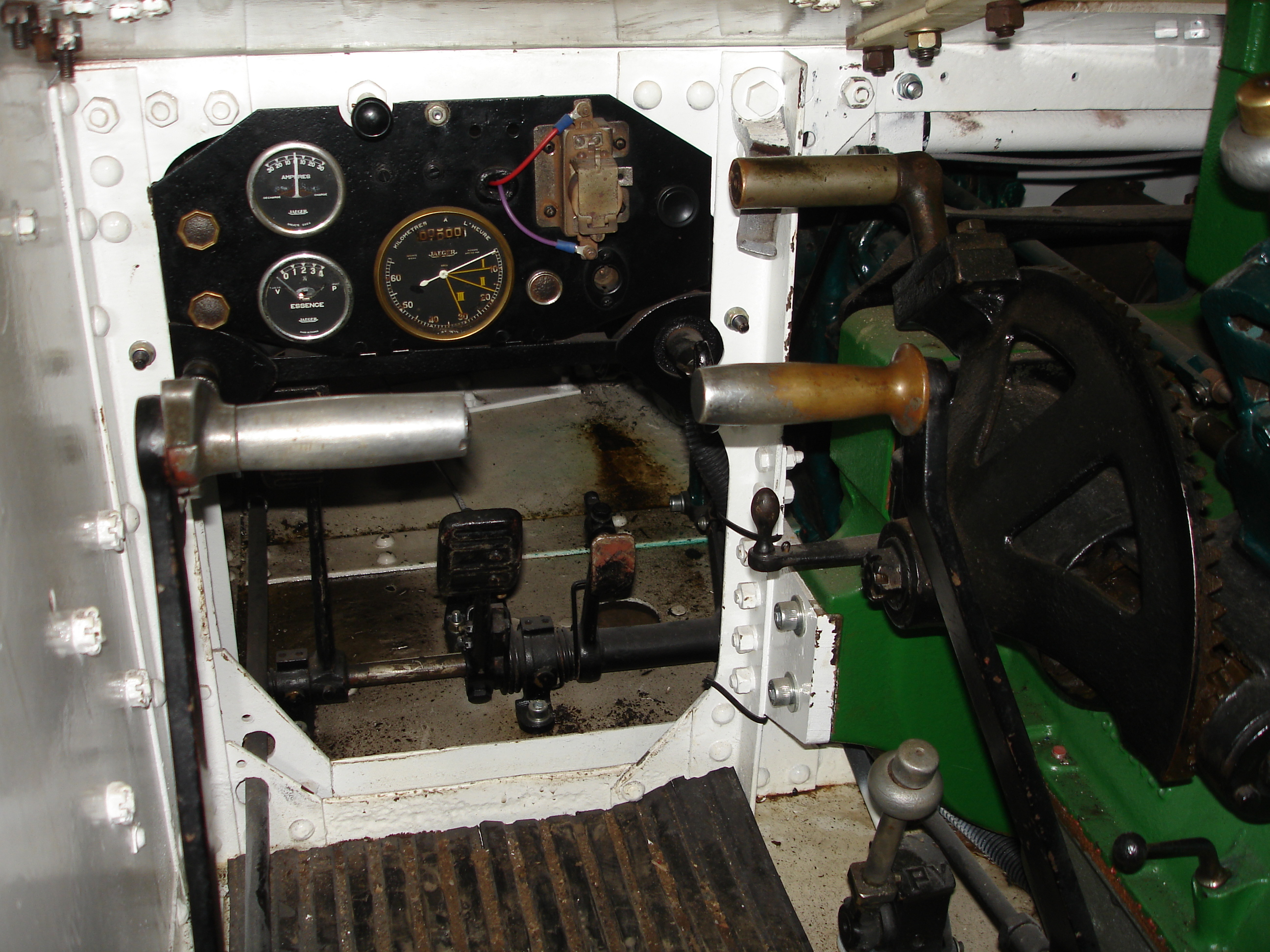
The driver's cabin.

The Chenillette ("small tracked vehicle") or tracteur blindé ("armoured tractor") as Renault preferred to call it, was a very small vehicle: just 280 centimetres long, 174 cm wide and having its highest point at 125 cm; the roof was only 103 cm high. Its cargo carrying capacity was rather limited. There was a rectangular armoured bin at the back, 145 cm long (its length corresponds to the width of the vehicle as a whole), 60 cm wide and 36 cm high, able to hold a load of about 350 kg (lower than the original specification of 500 kg); unloading was made easier by the possibility of tilting the bin; the back plate then hinged downwards, forming a slope on which cargo could slide to the ground. The main cargo was carried by the tracked trailer, a close copy of the British type, with a length of its bin of again 145 cm, a width of 110 cm and a height of 35 cm; weighing itself 775 kg, it could hold a load of about 600 kg — whereas the specification had asked for only 400 kg. The tracks could be removed for road transport; there were two road wheels per side.

The bin forms the back compartment of the vehicle; the larger front compartment was for the crew and engine. The four-cylinder 38 hp engine is positioned in the centre, with the driver to its left and the commander to its right. The gear box (six speeds forward, two reverse), differential and transmission were placed in front of the engine. These mechanical parts were placed under two projections on the otherwise very steeply sloped armour of the glacis; these can be retracted for maintenance of the mechanical parts. Each crew member, sitting below a hatch that is the only way of entrance or exit, has a fuel tank behind their seat, together having a total capacity of 56 litres, allowing for a range of a 100 kilometres (62 mi). The exhaust pipe ran in front of the commander to the right ending in a silencer on the right side of the vehicle; in later production vehicles an armoured cover was added. As it tended to overheat a later variant of this cover had cooling slits.

To reduce the vehicle's height, it was made impossible for the crew members to retract their heads under the roof. To protect these vital parts, two hemispherical armoured hoods (calottes) were fitted. These had vision slits but, to improve the field of vision, the front section of these hoods could be pivoted backwards over the back section like a visor. As otherwise a bar between the roof and the glacis would have hindered entrance, the forward hinging glacis hatches had an extension forming the roof section that fits around the front part of the hood; if the hood is retracted and the hatch opened, a larger entry space was thus available. An interesting feature of the vehicle was the internal communication system used. When the hoods were closed, the two crewmen, separated by the engine between them, could not directly communicate; neither internal nor external radio communications were possible, as there were no radio sets fitted. A system of white, blue, green and red lights, that could be made to shine continuously or flicker, was used by the commander to direct the driver when buttoned up, based on a predetermined signal code:

- Forward: continuous white light.
- To the left: continuous blue light.
- To the right: continuous green light.
- Backwards: flickering white light.
- Slow down: flickering red light.
- Stop: continuous red light.
- Decouple the trailer: alternating white and red light.
- Tilt the bin: alternating green and white light.

The suspension system closely resembled the Vickers type. There were 18.4 cm wide tracks with 131 small links and three bogies per side, sprung by small leaf springs, each carrying each two small road wheels. The prototype had an armoured plate protecting this assembly, but it was omitted on the production vehicles to save weight, leaving only two elongated beams to brace the whole. Likewise, the sprocket was simplified: the prototype's had been a closed disk, the production type had six circular holes; later vehicles were fitted with a wheel with six spokes. There were two return rollers. In all the suspension system was flimsy and vulnerable. This was compensated by limiting the official maximum speed to 30 km/h (19 mph), although the combination of a weight of just 2.64 metric tons with an engine power of 38 hp would allow for a higher speed; during testing 36 km/h (22 mph) was attained. This also reduced the chance of accidents while towing the trailer; fully loaded the road speed was reduced to 25 km/h (16 mph), the cross-country speed to 10 km/h (6.2 mph). The wading depth 30 cm (12 in) and the trench crossing depth 120 cm (47 in). The turning circle was 3 m (9 ft 10 in) and a slope of 50% could be climbed.

The value of the Chenillette as an armoured fighting vehicle was limited. In French service, the Modèle 31 carried no armament, although some later vehicles had attachment points for a removable AA-machinegun to be fitted — but this had to be operated from outside the vehicle in an awkward crouched position due to its low height. For the crew to use personal weapons through the hatches while sitting inside the hull was highly impractical. Consideration had been given to arming it with a machine-gun, but the Direction de l'Infanterie feared that if such a weapon were mounted, the UE would be misused as a light tank rather than being dedicated to its correct tactical resupply role. Likewise, the armour protection was minimal. The vertical plates had a thickness of nine millimetres, the other plates, all riveted, were six millimetres thick, just enough to stop normal rifle bullets and shell fragments.

== Development of the Renault UE2 ==
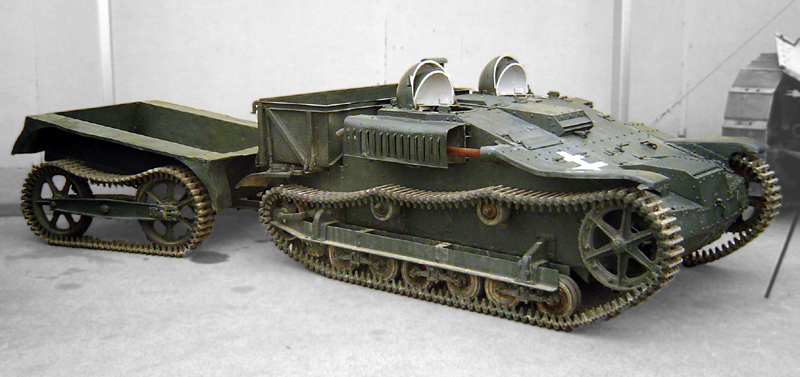
Renault UE2 with Renault UK trailer at the Musée des Blindés at Saumur; the upward bend of the front mudguard would make it be described as a Modèle 37; the internal mechanical parts are those of a late production vehicle.

From 1935, in reaction to the German rearmament, the French Infantry embarked on a major expansion and modernisation programme. Part of this was the project to replace the Chenillette Modèle 31 with an improved type, which however should remain within the weight limit of the earlier vehicle or 2.6 metric tons. Interest from the side of the French industry was high and during 1937 five companies proposed prototypes: Lorraine, Hotchkiss, Fouga, Berliet and Renault.

Lorraine de Dietrich, a company specialised in locomotive construction, presented a tractor and trailer to the Commission de Vincennes on 23 April 1937. The prototype was tested between 28 April and 10 June. Though, at a weight of four tons, heavier than specified, the type was approved by the commission on 8 July, with the period of testing extended to 23 August. Compared to the Modèle 31, the Lorraine chenillette was much more a dedicated supply vehicle, the larger size of which allowed for a superior carrying capacity, crew comfort and range, while its suspension with two bogies and four large road wheels ensured a good tactical mobility. On 8 September the commission concluded that there were no objections to series production; already the prototype had on 25 August been presented to the Commission de l'Infanterie at Mourmelon for tactical evaluation. Although the Infantry clearly favoured this type, eventually it was decided to use all production capacity of the company for the longer Lorraine 37L, as there was a lack of heavier movers; a first order of a hundred made early 1939 was in September changed into one for the other type.

On 3 November 1937 Hotchkiss presented the prototype of a tractor; on 10 December of a trailer. On both elements however the manufacturer had not done any testing, the vehicles having been transported to Vincennes as soon as they were finished. Therefore, the commission delayed its trials until 27 December to allow Hotchkiss to make final adjustments on the base area. The tractor was tested until 10 February 1938. The type closely resembled the general outline of the Renault UE. The main difference was the presence of two bins instead of one, able to tilt sideways, positioned over the back of the mudguards. This doubled the carrying capacity. Instead of the small hoods, two very large armoured covers, retractable to the back, served as both entrance hatch and visor. The engine, differential and steering system were judged to be acceptable. The suspension system however was considered to be too weak, not having been reinforced to match the larger cargo mass to avoid surpassing the specified total weight. It consisted of two bogies, each with two small road wheels, sprung by narrow horizontal coil springs. A large tension wheel trailed on the ground, which lowered ground pressure to compensate for the larger weight of the bins but also increased track resistance and vibration. The cross-country speed was just 15 kilometres per hour (9.3 mph). As even during testing when fully loaded, entire bogies collapsed, the prototype was rejected.

The Fouga aircraft company submitted a prototype tractor and trailer on 2 February 1939. It was tested until 8 May. This vehicle also closely resembled the Renault UE, but had a higher roof, making hoods unnecessary and enlarging the cargo space. Its suspension had two bogies per side with each two road wheels, sprung by leaf springs. The type, its submission too late because a choice had already been made for a rivalling type, was rejected because its mechanical parts were not easily accessible and the vibration level was too high.

Berliet obtained an order for a prototype on 4 December 1936. A tractor and trailer were however only presented to the Commission de Vincennes on 6 March 1939, testing starting immediately. The type again resembled the Renault UE but was somewhat higher. It had three bogies per side with two road wheels each, sprung by horizontal coil springs. The weight was 3.05 metric tons, its top speed 36 kilometres per hour (22 mph), the range 143 kilometres (89 mi). The first report of the commission was favourable and trials resumed on 24 April, lasting till 20 May. It transpired that the tractor could attain a top speed of 30 kilometres per hour (19 mph) even when pulling the trailer. The commission concluded on 8 June that the Berliet chenillette was superior to the Renault UE in speed, range and mechanical reliability and saw no objection against taking it into production. This however was eventually rejected by the Army in order to concentrate all production facilities into a single type, which had already replaced the UE: the UE 2.

Renault had been further developing the UE from 1931 onwards. Some features had been introduced to the production series, some derived into new prototypes; others had remained mere paper projects. Renault always strongly lobbied to attain official, and thus financed, state orders for his development projects and on 20 December 1934 he had managed to obtain one for an improved Renault UE, the Renault UE 2. One by one during 1935 and 1936 improved components were submitted to the Commission de Vincennes to be tested and modified according to the wishes of the Army. These included: reinforced pistons; a new gear box with four speeds forward and one reverse; a reinforced differential; longer front mudguards of which the back part bent upwards to form a continuous plane with the glacis, a semi-automatic attachment system for the trailer and a night light at the lower left back of the vehicle. These changes were not very fundamental — the commission was not even aware this was supposed to end in a new type — but Renault used this very fact as an argument to select the UE 2 as the replacement vehicle: the improvements could be introduced without interrupting production, whereas the switch to a completely different design might cause a fatal delay in the rearmament process. This proved to be a decisive consideration for the Army and in November 1937 a choice was made for the Renault UE2 to become the type for mass production: the Chenillette de ravitaillement d'Infanterie Modèle 1937 R. An order was placed with AMX — the nationalised former Renault factory — on 3 December. Other manufacturers were also employed: in fact, Fouga had already obtained an order on 2 December; Berliet would be given one on 16 March 1938.

These manufacturers however did not immediately take the Modèle 37 into production; they in fact made the Modèle 31 to complete the first production batches; only in the summer of 1939, when the French economy went into full gear to prepare for increased war production, was the gradual transition to the UE 2 really made although some new features, such as the mudguards, premiered in the summer of 1936; from the summer of 1937 the original Restor headlights were swapped to the armoured Guicherd type. The Army did not discern between the two UE types and eventually in the statistics subsumed all chenillettes received under the denominator Modèle 31. By 1 September 1939 2848 Renault UEs of both models had been manufactured. In 1940 a production of 300 vehicles per month was aimed at. To ensure such a high output Renault bought the SUP factory at Pontlieue, to start another UE 2 assembly line there. By 1 April 1940, AMX had built 1,080 Renault UE2s, Fouga 260s and Berliet 310s. In May, monthly deliveries reached the total number of 509, made possible by emptying the factory matériel stocks; by 1 June, 4,977 Renault chenillettes of both models had been built, of which 4,557 had been delivered; total production destined for France was about 5,148, on the assumption that about 2,300 vehicles had been produced after 1 September. In the 1970's, it was still assumed that the production realised before December 1937 — mistakenly equated to that of the Modèle 31 — was not included in this number; total production was thus overestimated at about 6,200.

== Armed Renault Chenillettes ==
In the early 1930s, the French Cavalry was in need of a small scouting vehicle. On 27 November 1931, the Section Technique de la Cavalerie asked Renault to rebuild one of his six chenillette prototypes into an armed tankette. Prototype N° 77982 was therefore turned into a Automitrailleuse légère de contact tout terrain in the winter of 1932, by being fitted with a small rectangular superstructure holding in its front a ballmount with machine-gun to be operated by the commander; the hood was placed on top of it. This type was rejected by the Cavalry for being too slow; further developments would however result in the AMR 33 light cavalry tank of which the Renault UE was the direct ancestor.

Renault was always very intent on procuring foreign orders, but generally without much success. To improve the attractiveness of his Renault UE he also offered a version with a machine-gun. In March 1936 the government of China placed an order for ten Renault UEs armed with machine-guns, together with twelve Renault ZB tanks. Though the tanks eventually reached China in 1940, the chenillettes were held up in Haiphong from 1938 because France gave in to Japanese pressure; they appear to have been confiscated in 1940 by the French authorities of Indochina. Including these export vehicles, total French Renault UE production was thus about 5,158.

During the Battle of France, in May 1940, the swiftly deteriorating situation led to an order being issued to arm all available tracked chassis and send them to the front. This included the available FT-17 hulls from which the turret had been removed to turn them into utility vehicles, the Renault ZT 4s that had not yet received their turrets, and also the Renault UE Modèle 37s produced from that moment. On 25 May, the Direction d'Infanterie requested that Renault produce a prototype on the lines of his Chinese UEs, with a machine-gun armed superstructure. Another existing 200 vehicles were to be refitted with a simpler external MAC 1931 "Reibel" machine-gun mount. It is unknown how many of both types were in fact built or modified; at least one vehicle with a superstructure is still extant.

On 31 May, a 25 mm Hotchkiss anti-tank gun was fitted on a single vehicle for trial purposes; this led to an order on 10 June for 150 of such tank destroyers; none were produced.

== Șenileta Malaxa Tipul UE ==
Șenileta Malaxa Tipul UE
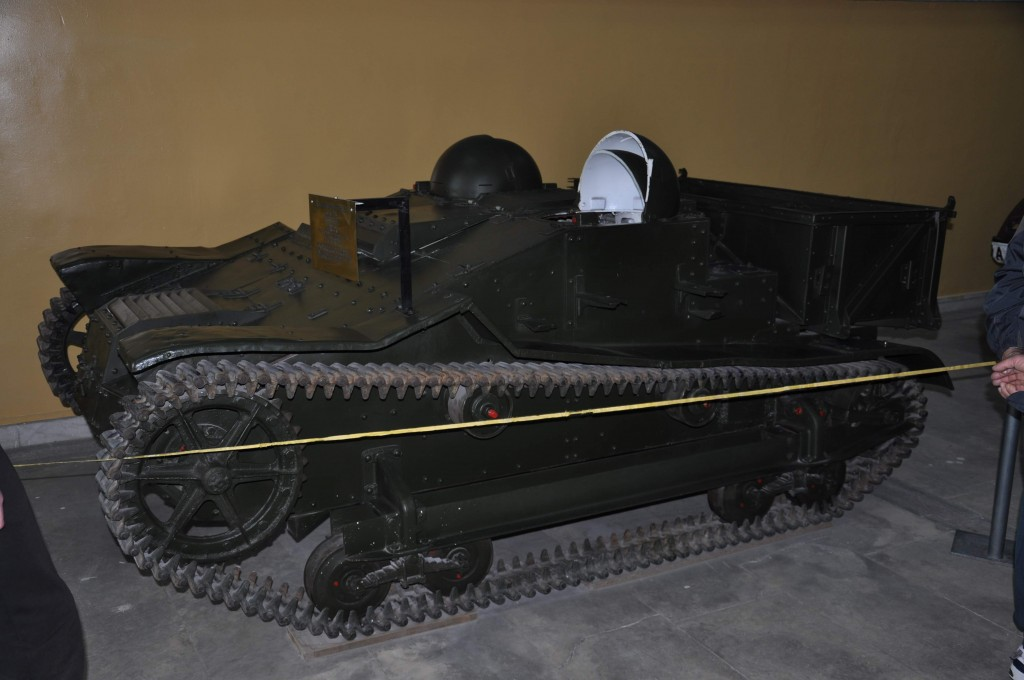
- Romanian-built Malaxa UE carrier at the National Military Museum in Bucharest.
- Type: Prime mover
- Place of origin: Romania

Service history
- Used by: Romania; Iron Guard

Production history
- Designer: Renault; Malaxa (several modifications)
- Manufacturer: Malaxa
- Produced: Late 1939 – March 1941
- No. built: 126

Specifications (Data from)
- Mass: 2.74 t (6,000 lb)
- Length: 2.85 m (9 ft 4 in)
- Width: 1.8 m (5 ft 11 in)
- Height: 1.26 m (4 ft 2 in)
- Crew: 2
- Armor: 9 mm (0.35 in)
- Engine: Renault, 4 cylinder, water-cooled 35 hp (26 kW)
- Payload capacity: 500 kg (1,100 lb) in cargo bin
- Suspension: leaf spring
- Ground clearance: 30 cm (12 in)
- Operational range: 100 km (62 mi)
- Maximum speed: 30 km/h (19 mph)

In 1937, Romania, then still a French ally, bought about ten UEs. As a first step in creating an indigenous armored fighting vehicle industry, in 1937 the Romanian Defence Minister bought a licence to locally produce 300 Renault UE Chenillettes. The vehicle was meant to tow the 47 mm Schneider anti-tank gun. The licence was acquired by the Malaxa factory in Bucharest, the vehicle being subsequently designated Șenileta Malaxa Tipul UE. All of the vehicle's parts except the engine, gearbox and instrument panel were manufactured locally by Malaxa, the former three being delivered by the French AMX factory. Production lasted from the second half of 1939 to March 1941, during which 126 carriers were produced. The production was cut short when the supply of Renault parts was interrupted by the fall of France. Germany then delivered about fifty captured Renault UEs to Romania. The 126 Malaxa chenillettes accounted for the bulk of such vehicles (178 in total) in operation by the Romanian Army at the start of Operation Barbarossa. The chenillette first saw combat service during the Iron Guard rebellion, when two were used by the Iron Guard. The Malaxa chenillette was not an entirely identical copy of the Renault UE. It was heavier by 0.1 tons and was able to carry in its cargo bin 0.15 tons more than its French counterpart. Its length, width and height were all slightly increased by five centimetres, six centimetres and one centimetre respectively. Its engine was slightly weaker by 3 hp, but it still managed to achieve the same top speed and range as its French counterpart.

In the Romanian army, the type was deployed in the anti-tank companies, towing the 47 mm Schneider Model 1936 — a heavier gun than in the French army, which had considered the Renault UE to be much too light to move guns of this calibre — and as a munition and fuel carrier in the Motorised Cavalry Regiments. After 1943, thirty three of the fifty surviving vehicles were used for training; the other seventeen were, from January 1944 until March, rebuilt by the Malaxa factory, which reinforced them to allow them to tow the even heavier German 50 mm L/60 anti-tank gun. The Romanian vehicles, including the ten imported, bring the total Renault UE production to about 5,294.

== Projects ==
One of the six Renault UE prototypes had a rubber track; in 1932, this line of development was taken further by rebuilding a vehicle into the Renault UE Neige ("snow") or Renault UE N. For better traction this type had a more robust suspension with a broader rubber track, powered by a stronger six-cylinder engine.

In the mid-thirties, Chaubeyre produced the prototype of a smoke-laying vehicle in which the smoke generator used a 1,000 l tank placed on a Renault UK trailer. The system was to be controlled from the commander's position of the main vehicle.

After the larger orders had been made in 1937, both AMX and the Renault design bureau, that had not been nationalised, tried to introduce further modifications to improve the production series. Several of these would indeed be incorporated into the UE 2 production run, but these were of a minor nature; there were however much more fundamental changes proposed, aimed at solving the structural suspension problems, that were the reason Berliet and Fouga still tried to obtain approval of their chenillette projects, even after a choice had been made for the Renault UE2: they hoped that eventually the Renault UE would be abandoned altogether. To be able to present immediate alternatives, should the occasion arise, AMX and Renault developed stronger suspension systems.

In February 1938, Renault presented stronger tracks and more resistant road wheels, with an improved device to keep the axles waterproof, to the Commission de Vincennes. These were tested from 12 February until 6 July and again from 21 September until 21 November.

In July 1938, a prototype of a lengthened chenillette was presented by Renault. It had a fourth bogie in the suspension to reduce track pressure and a third return wheel. To save weight and better dampen shocks the number of leaves in the leaf springs was reduced from six to three. The tracks were obviously longer too, with 156 instead of 131 links. The bin was also "longer" at 72 centimetres, but less "wide" with 123 cm. Internally a new centrifugal ventilator type was fitted. The total length increased to 335 cm, the weight to 3.67 metric tons. Trials took place between 13 July 1938 and 8 February 1939, during which the vehicle was again modified. The top speed without trailer transpired to be reduced to 32.7 km/h; unsurprisingly the trench crossing ability was improved to 160 cm. As the air outlets had been placed higher, the wading capacity was improved to 45 cm. However, the main purpose: ameliorating suspension reliability, was not really achieved. Tracks were still thrown, track guides bent, springs broke and entire bogies were sheared off, just as with the series model.

On 22 November 1938, AMX presented its new track. This was fitted only to the right side of a trials vehicle so that direct comparisons could be made with the old track type. After 1,500 kilometres (930 mi) the normal track was completely worn out and the AMX track was now fitted to a second vehicle. Testing resumed on 9 January 1939 but it was not until after 3,700 kilometres (2,300 mi), on 21 March, that the new track was worn. The commission concluded that the new type was clearly superior in durability, but that this was caused by the use of chrome steel that made it 70% more expensive, too pricy for the French Army.

On 27 September 1939, AMX presented its new suspension system. It resembled that of the Renault R35, with two bogies, horizontal springs (though with oil dampening) and five road wheels per side. The prototype also had a new Chausson radiator and more comfortable suspended crew seats. The new type however was not tested immediately; only after Renault had presented another prototype, this time with seven road wheels — an extra wheel having been inserted in the space created by moving the bogie assembly 20 cm (8 inches) backward — both types were compared together between 7 and 23 February 1940. It was shown that the AMX suspension, though much sturdier, had a negative influence on the performance: speed and range fell about 15%, mostly due to an incorrect weight distribution. The new seats, though clearly adding to crew comfort, were too high, preventing a soldier of normal height from closing the hood. However, the new Renault suspension offered no clear advantages over the older model in terms of vibration level and crew fatigue, so both models were in the end rejected as possible modification projects of existing vehicles; AMX's type was judged on 11 April 1940 not to be acceptable for future production.

== Service history ==
The Renault UE was employed at the start of World War II by the French Army, and was subsequently pressed into German Army service, as well as being used in limited numbers by Free France and Romanian forces.

=== French use ===
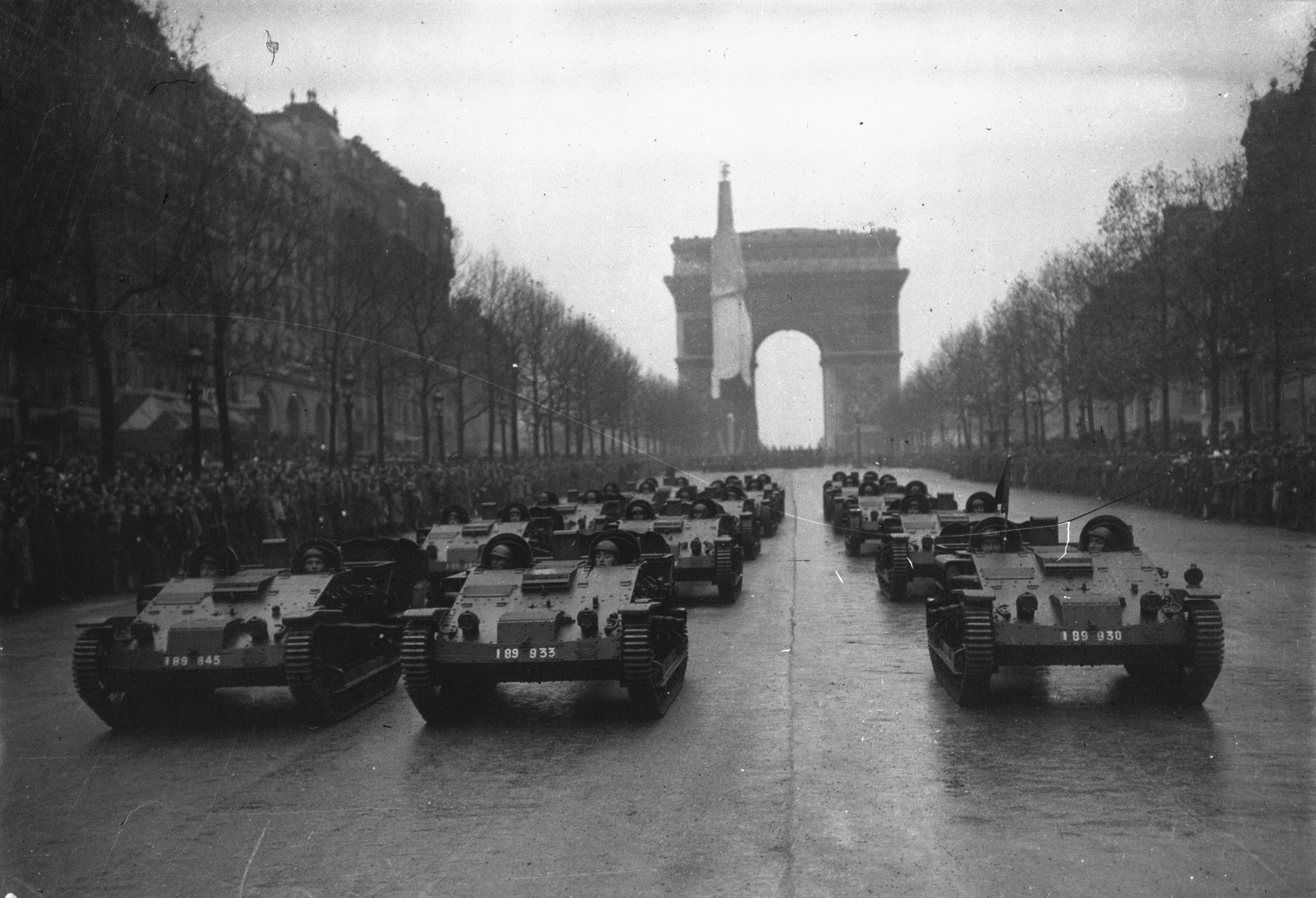
Military parade of Renault UE in Paris in the 18th anniversary of the Armistice on 11 November 1936.

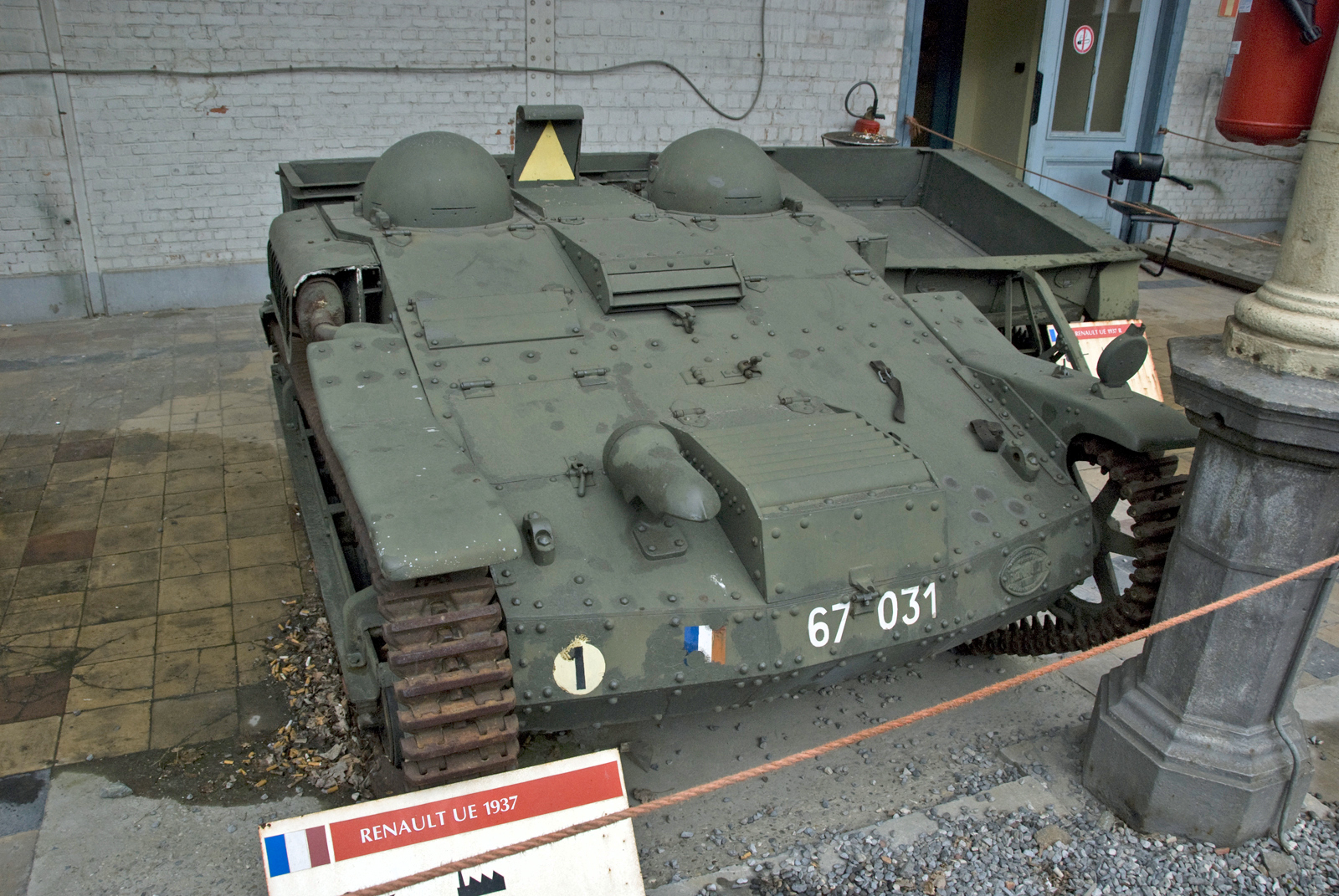
Renault UE in the Army Museum of Brussels.

The chenillette was mainly allocated to the standard Infantry Regiments, the first on 10 September 1932. There were six chenillettes present in the Compagnie Hors Rang (the company not subordinated to any battalion, and serving as the regimental supply, maintenance and replacement unit) and three in the Compagnie Régimentaire d'Engins, the regimental heavy weapons support company. Their primary official function was that of a supply vehicle to provide frontline positions with ammunition and other necessities while under artillery fire. The light armour was sufficient to stop small shell fragments and rifle or machine-gun fire at ranges greater than 300 meters. The Renault UE could carry or tow approximately 1,000 kg of supplies; this included 350 kg in the cargo bin and 600 kg in the trailer. Typical loads included 81 mm Brandt mortar ammunition, ammunition for the 25 mm Hotchkiss anti-tank gun or rifle and machine-gun ammunition. To indicate they were towing, the tractors would erect a small rectangular steel plaque on the roof showing a yellow triangle on a contrasting blue background. The remainder of the vehicle was normally painted a dull bronze green overall, not using the intricate three- or four-colour schemes typical of French armour of the time. The more exposed forward positions would be supplied by the tractors only; their bins, though small, could still hold 150 25 mm rounds or 2,688 machine-gun rounds. Mortar and gun teams were expected to move their own weapons if the move was less than 1,000 meters, otherwise, they were loaded, two each, in UEs for longer movements; likewise four machine-guns could be loaded. The 25 mm gun could optionally be towed. As the tractors were too small to accommodate the weapon crews, these had to move behind, following the vehicles on foot; the piece commander during this procedure sat next to the chenillette driver to indicate the desired new position of his mortar or gun. This was the only occasion that within the Infantry Regiments a second crew member was really present: the driver normally formed the entire crew, although an assistant driver was allocated. A chenillette was thus never permanently attached to an individual weapon system; each 25 mm gun e.g. was normally towed by its own horse-team. For longer distance moves, the chenillette would be normally loaded on a truck, with the Renault UK trailer and (on good roads) possible mortars or guns towed behind. The larger trailer was officially never part of such a tow; it was in short supply, with just one available for four tractors each (two in each regiment) and only used to remove these if they had broken down. In practice it was not uncommon to transport the smaller trailer on the truck, while using the larger to move the tractor, as the prescribed procedure lowered the convoy speed to 15 kilometres per hour (9.3 mph).

Each Infantry Regiment had nine Renault UEs; the Compagnie Divisionnaire Antichar (CDAC), the division anti-tank company, also had three chenillettes, making for a total of thirty Renault UEs in the normal infantry division.

In the Motorised Infantry Divisions, chenillette strength was much higher however. Their CDAC had twelve chenillettes, one for each 25 mm gun — and in this case each individual gun had its own tractor. In their CREs, six Renault UEs were present, again one allocated to each 25 mm gun; and their battalions had in their Compagnies d'Accompagnement two Renault UEs to serve their organic two Brandt mortars and two 25 mm guns. The Motorised Infantry Regiments thus had eighteen chenillettes each, the MIDs in total 66. These are the official standard numbers; actual strengths (and uses) varied, also dependent on the replacement of the 25 mm gun by the 47 mm Brandt that was considered too heavy to be towed by a chenillette. In total, the French Army had an organic strength of about 2,500 Renault UEs; as the number of vehicles produced became after September 1939 much higher, Modèle 31s, mostly completely worn out, were gradually phased out. These older vehicles were sometimes unofficially appropriated by engineer and artillery units. Depot strength on 10 May was 1278.

Being in principle an unarmed vehicle, the Germans allowed the Renault UE be employed by Vichy France. The type served in various conflicts involving the French colonies, used both by the government forces and the Free French. In May 1943, there was an attempt by the Free French to add the British Ordnance QF 6 pounder anti-tank gun, mounted on the rear of the vehicle with a gun shield. The relative size of the gun and the vehicle meant that it had to be operated from rear, as there was no room for the crew to operate it in the vehicle. After disappointing trial runs, the prototype was reverted to its original role as an artillery tractor. After the Allied invasion of France in June 1944 some vehicles were used by the French irregular and regular forces in France. After the war some units for a few years still made use of the type. Some vehicles were taken into use by the army of Syria.

=== German use ===
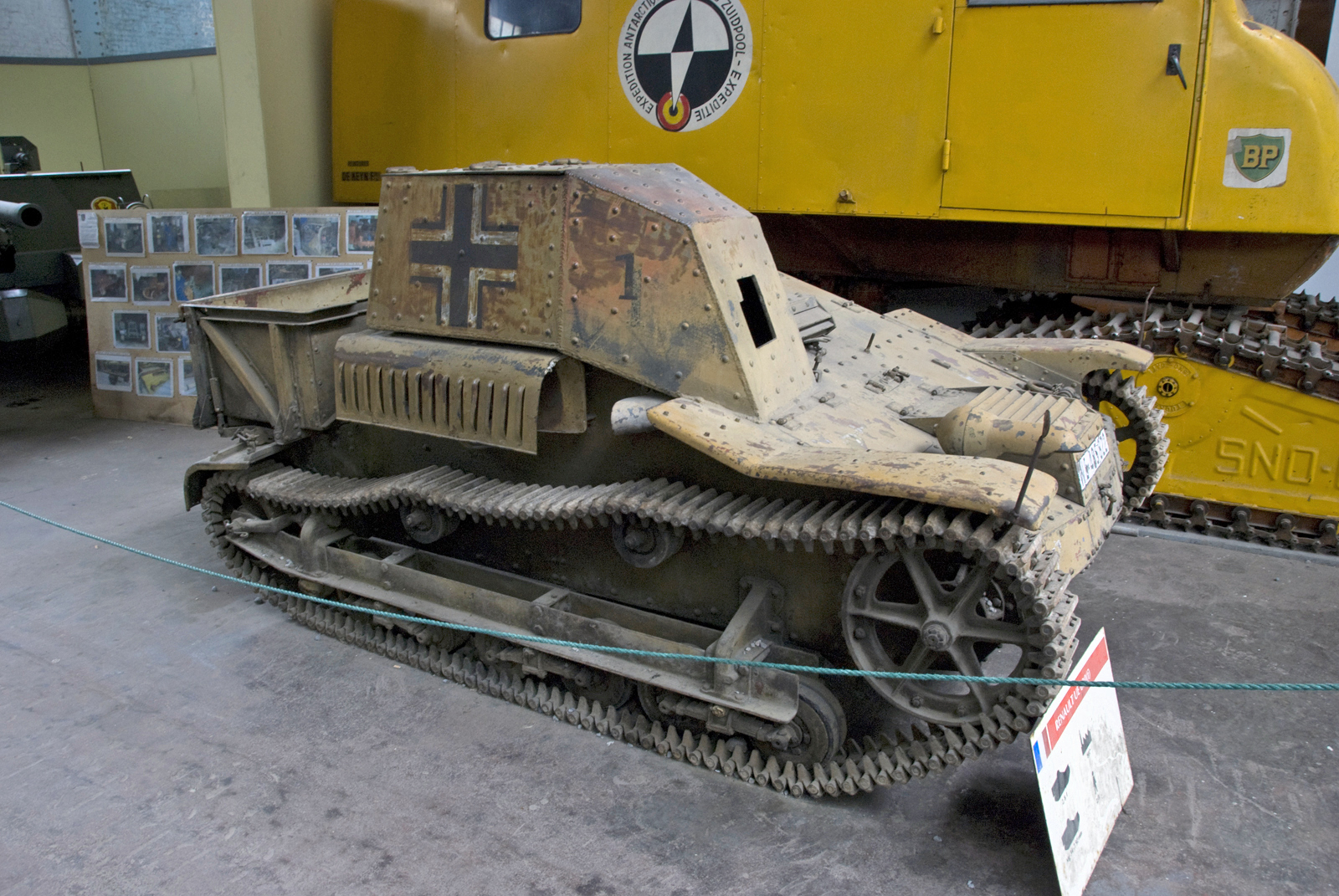
Renault UE2 converted into a Gepanzerte-MG-Träger Renault UE(f). This vehicle at Brussels is still in its "original" German colours.

In the Fall of France, about 3,000 UE and UE2s had been captured by the German armed forces (Wehrmacht). Most were employed unmodified, after an overhaul by the Ateliers de construction d'Issy-les-Moulineaux (AMX) factory under guidance of the German MAN company, as tractors for the 37 mm, 50 mm and, ultimately, 75 mm and 76.2 mm anti-tank guns as the Infanterie UE-Schlepper 630(f), which also was used to tow light and even heavy infantry guns. They might also function in their original primary role of munition carrier, as Munitionsschlepper Renault UE(f), some of these had an armoured roof fitted above the bin, to protect the ammunition load against overhead shell airbursts. Chenillettes were however also modified into self-propelled guns: a German 3.7 cm Pak 36 was fitted just in front of the bin. There was no room for the crew in such a small vehicle: the gun had to be operated while standing behind it. Nevertheless, about 700 of these Selbstfahrlafette für 3.7 cm Pak36 auf Renault UE(f) would be built in 1941. A late modification from 1943 was the UE fitted with four Wurfrahmen 40 launchers for 28/32 cm rockets: the Selbstfahrlafette für 28/32 cm Wurfrahmen auf Infanterie-Schlepper UE(f), forty of which would be built in two versions, one with the launch frames at the sides of the hull, the other with a raised platform on the back. Other modifications included: the Mannschaftstransportwagen Renault UE(f), a personnel carrier produced in two versions; the Gepanzerte-MG-Träger Renault UE(f), simply a Renault UE fitted with a machine-gun in a superstructure above the commander's seat; the Schneeschleuder auf Renault UE(f), a snow plough, fifty of which were modified in 1942; the Schneefräser auf Renault UE(f), also a vehicle intended to combat heavy snow conditions on the Eastern Front, but in the form of a snow miller; the Fernmeldekabel-Kraftwagen Renault UE(f), a telephone cable-laying vehicle and the Panzerkampfwagen-Attrappe auf UE(f), a dummy tank for training purposes, resembling a Soviet T-34. More complicated rebuilds were the Sicherungsfahrzeug UE(f), an airfield security vehicle produced for the Luftwaffe which, besides the 7.92 mm MG 34 casemate on the right, had a special high armoured superstructure fitted on the left back in which a guard could sit armed with a 13 mm machine-gun and the Kleiner Funk- und Beobachtungspanzer auf Infanterie-Schlepper UE(f), a special radio and artillery observation vehicle, forty of which would be modified by the Baukommando Becker (named after Alfred Becker) in France to eventually serve with the 21st Panzer Division.

=== Italian use ===
Germany later delivered many UEs to its allies, such as Italy. The Italian army obtained 64 UE and UE2s in 1941 and used them as ammunition carriers. Some were used in Sicily, where in 1943 during the Allied invasion of Sicily several were captured and used by the US Army.

=== Polish use ===
The Polish 1st and 2nd Grenadier infantry divisions which were established in France in 1939-40 were issued with UE 2s. In addition the Polish Independent Highland Brigade was issued with UE 2s. Seventeen units left over from the Polish Independent Highland Brigade's cancelled mission to Finland ended up in Britain where they were used by the Perth Reconnaissance Battalion and later for driver training by the Polish 3/16th Tank Brigade.

=== Thai use ===
The Royal Thai Army captured a small number of Renault UEs during the 1940-41 Franco-Thai War.

=== Chinese use ===
The National Revolutionary Army used some Renault UEs during Second Sino Japanese War.

== Surviving vehicles ==
By January 2024, several UEs were still in existence, in varying degrees of condition.

== See also ==
- C2P artillery tractor
