= Wurfrahmen 40 =

German World War II multiple rocket launcher

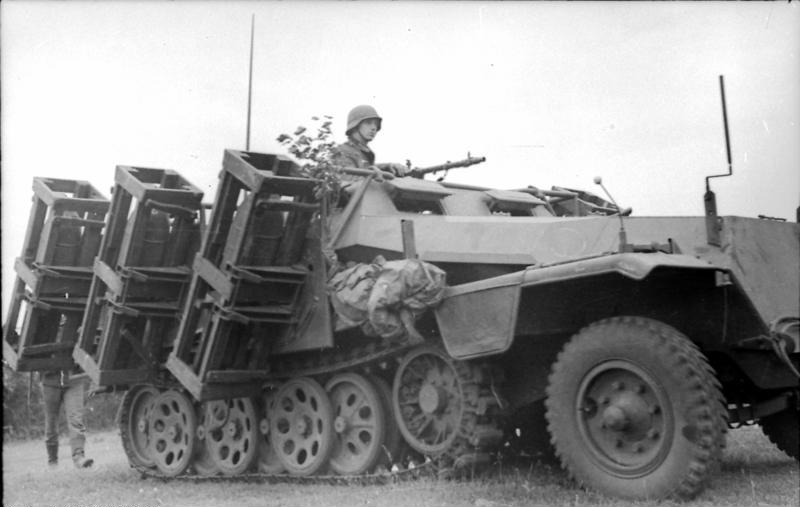
Wurfrahmen mounted on Sd.Kfz. 251

The Wurfrahmen 40 ("launch frame 40") was a German World War II multiple rocket launcher. It combined a vehicle such as the Sd.Kfz. 251 halftrack or captured French Renault UE Chenillette with rocket artillery to form a more mobile and protected artillery piece than the towed Nebelwerfer. It was nicknamed Stuka zu Fuss ("Stuka on Foot" or "Walking Stuka") and Heulende Kuh ("Bellowing Cow").

== Development ==
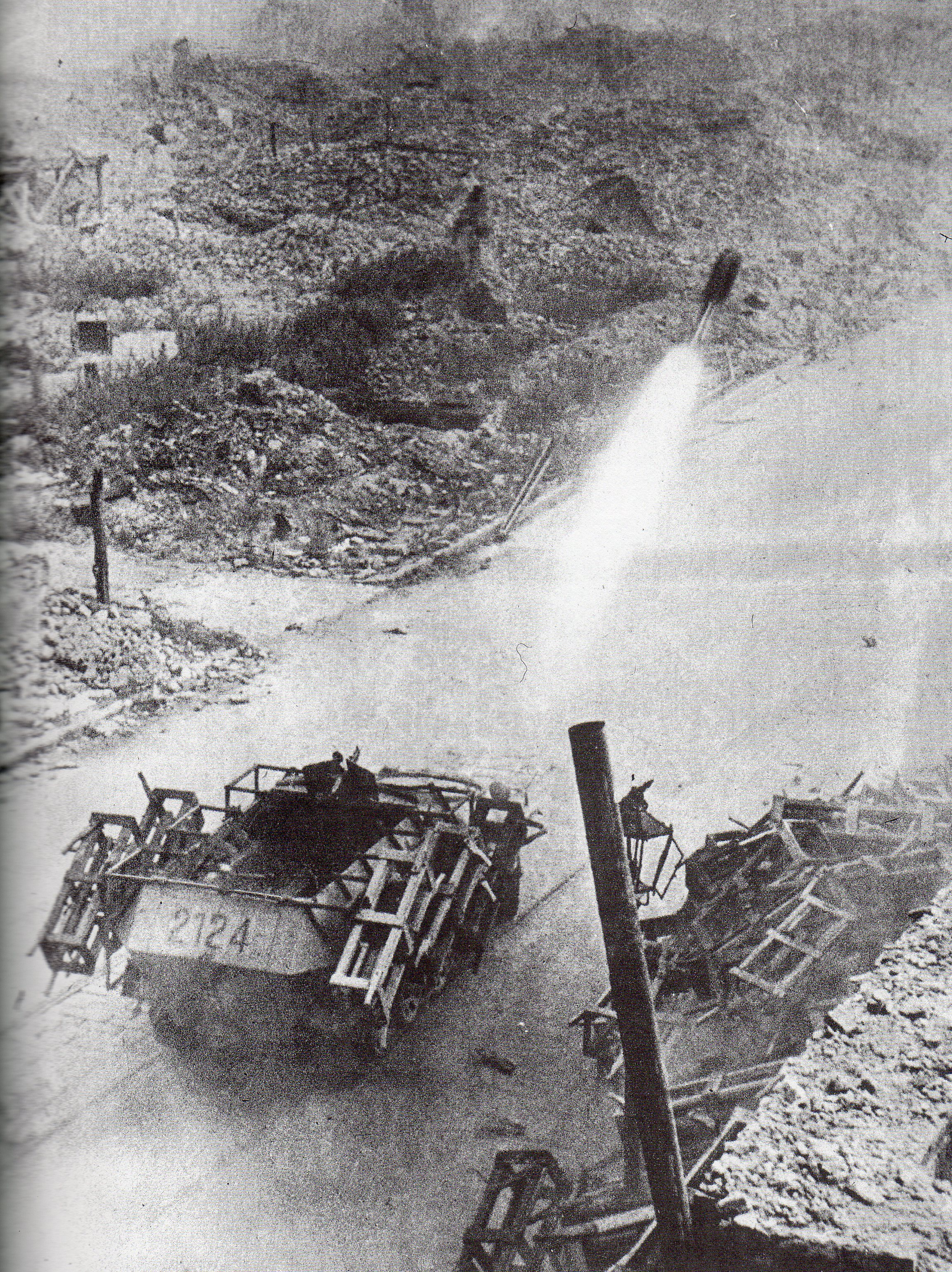
Sd.Kfz. 251-mounted Wurfrahmen in action against Polish positions during the Warsaw Uprising

Introduced in late 1940, the weapon system was a framework with adjustable base plates fitted over and alongside a vehicle which could hold 300 mm high explosive (HE) rockets; 280 mm HE and 320 mm incendiary rockets were also used, the rockets being fired while in their loading crates. Although spin stabilized, the rockets were not as accurate as conventional artillery, and reloading was time-consuming due to their weight. Where feasible, rockets were ripple-fired in large numbers to quickly saturate a target. The system was successful as a support weapon for mobile Panzer formations, particularly in urban areas.

When used on the common mounting, the Sd.Kfz. 251 halftrack, a frame with six base plates were used, with three on each side. The Chenillette UE employed either two per side or four frames on the rear. The Hotchkiss H35 mounting used two per side also. Some captured American M3 halftracks also mounted Wurfrahmen, with four frames at two per side.

== See also ==
- Nebelwerfer
- Panzerwerfer
- American T40 Whizbang
- U.S. Navy 7.2-Inch Demolition Rocket
