= Shoot-and-scoot =

Artillery tactic

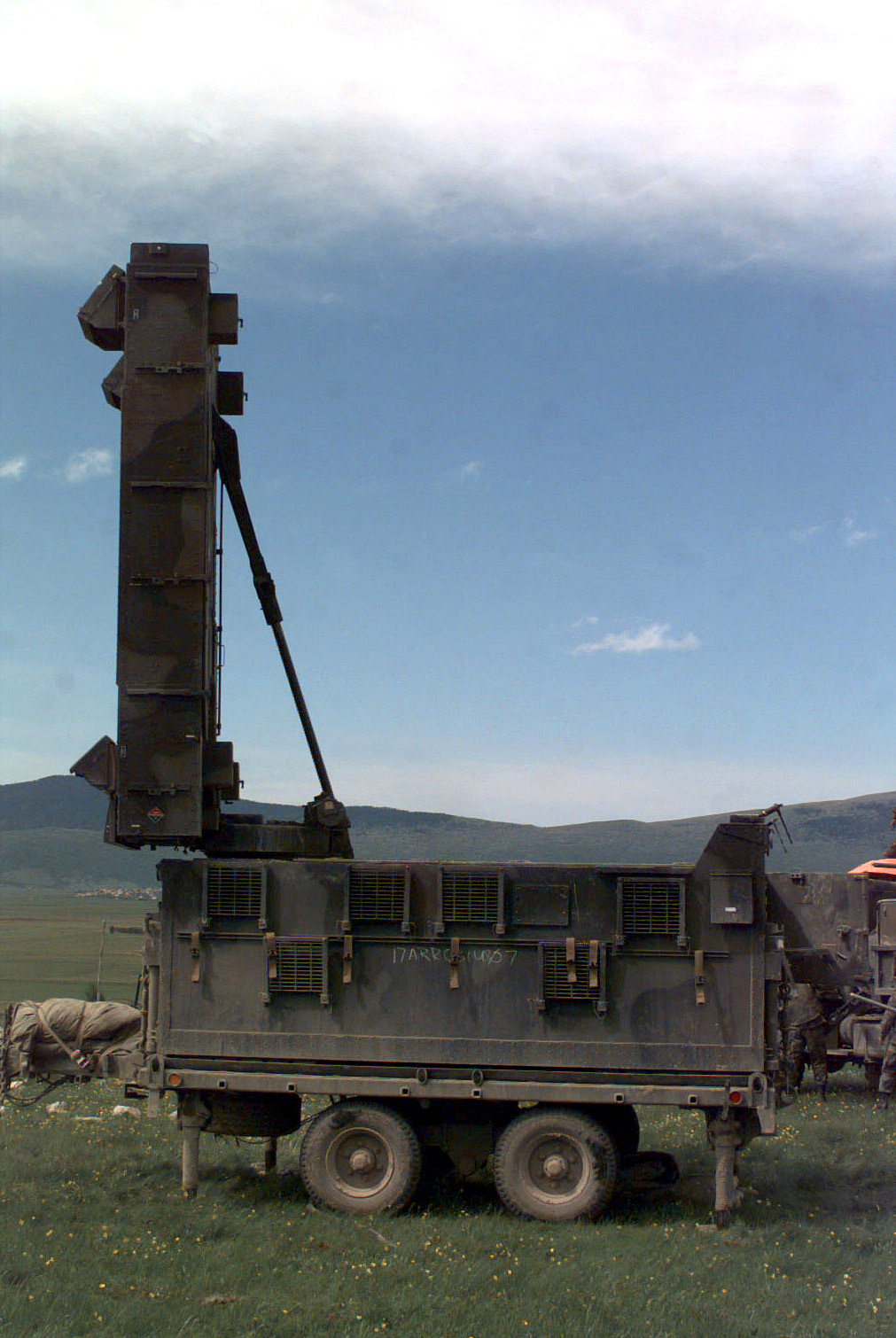
The AN/TPQ-37 radar can detect hostile artillery fire and direct friendly units to fire back, necessitating fire-and-displace tactics for defence.

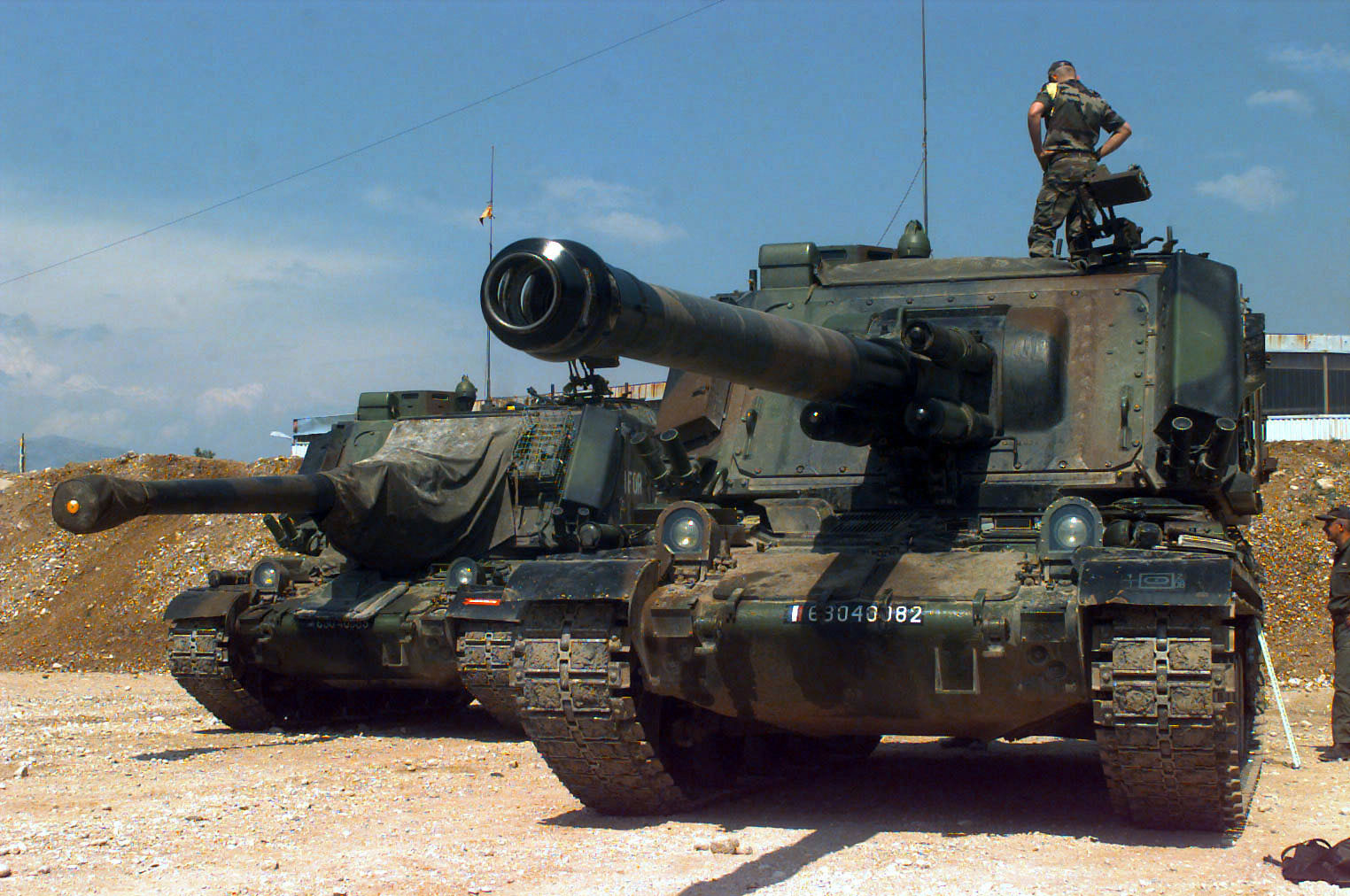
The AMX 30 AuF1, a self-propelled gun in service in the French Army, one possible tool for the shoot-and-scoot tactics.

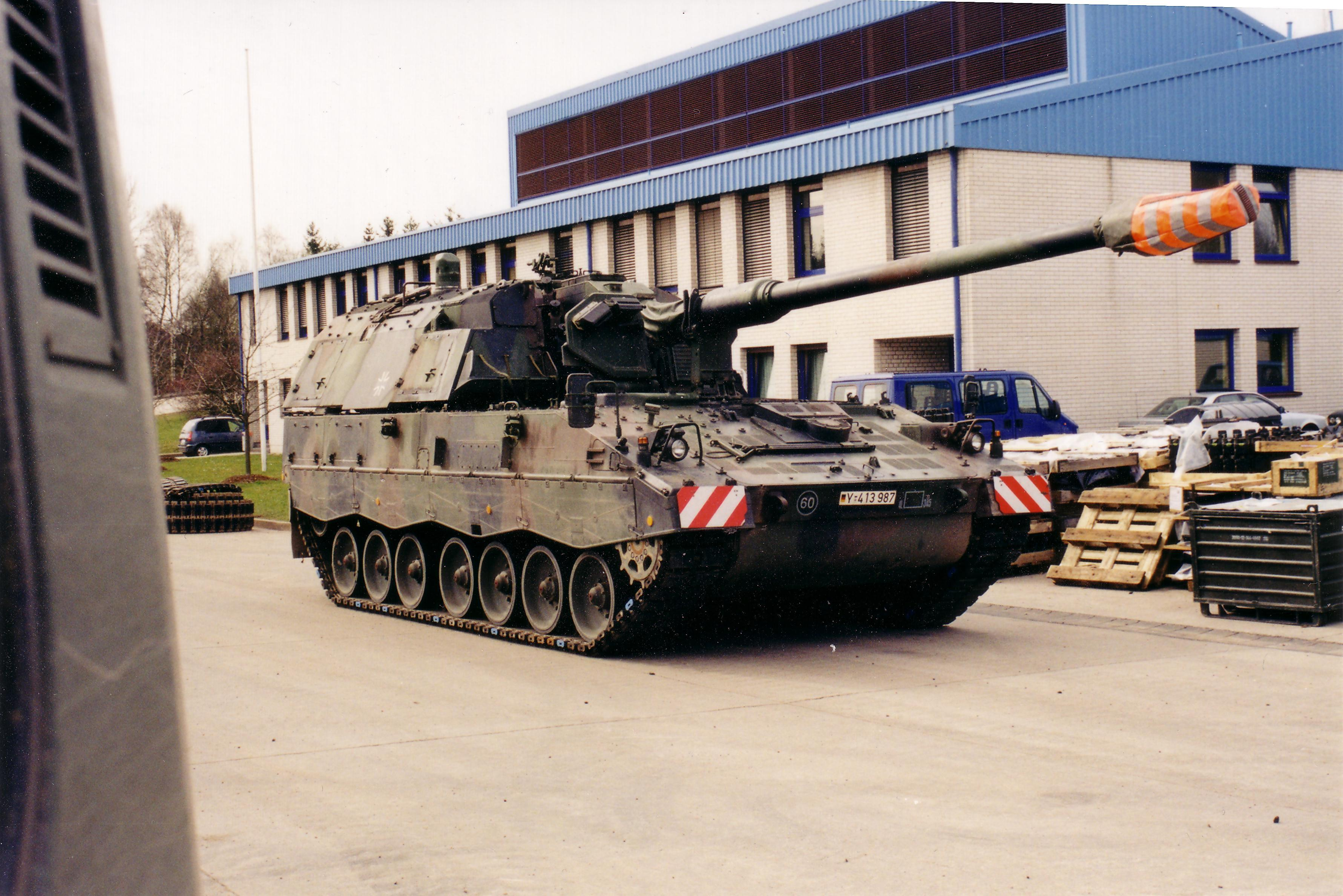
The modern PzH 2000 of the German Army with shoot-and-scoot ability can fire between 10 and 13 rounds per minute.

Shoot-and-scoot (alternatively, fire-and-displace or fire-and-move) is an artillery tactic of firing at a target and then immediately moving away from the location from where the shots were fired to avoid counter-battery fire, e.g., from enemy artillery.

== Caucasian War ==
The first recorded use of this tactic came from the Caucasian War where the Chechen Naib Talkhig of Shali became famous for his shoot-and-scoot tactics, termed nomadic artillery by Russians, in the 1830-1850s. According to the Russian historian and professor Nikolay Smirnov, he was one of the first commanders to use this tactic.

== World War II ==
The need for such tactics in World War II became obvious from the noticeable smoke signature produced by the use of anti-tank infantry weapons such as the German Panzerfaust anti-tank grenade launcher, the American M1 bazooka and its German Panzerschreck derivative anti-tank rocket launchers, and also by the various models of Nebelwerfer and Wurfrahmen 40 German barrage rocket systems. In modern times, moving after firing is important, as there are a multitude of electronic systems, such as counter-battery radar that can automatically detect artillery fire in near real-time and direct counter-battery fire from friendly artillery.

== Rocket launcher ==
Shoot and scoot was originally made possible and used by Soviet Katyusha rocket artillery, whose rudimentary construction of rails on a truck chassis made it comparatively light and mobile, while its quick 7-10 second full salvo, slow reload, and complete lack of protection made switching positions its main tactic and best defence.

== NATO ==
Shoot and scoot tactics were first adopted by NATO in the early 1960s by its nuclear artillery units using towed 8-inch howitzers and truck-mounted MGR-1 Honest John rockets. These operated as single guns or launchers, typically deployed to a hide, came into action when given a nuclear fire mission, fired and immediately came out of action and moved to another hide adjacent to another firing position. These tactics became normal for missile units worldwide and were successfully used by Iraqi missile units in the 1990–1991 Gulf War.

== M270 ==
Similar tactics were adopted by M270 Multiple Launch Rocket System (MLRS) platoons when it entered service, although in this case the launchers usually went first to a reload site after firing. It may be used by Indian Pinaka MBRL or Russian Grad, Uragan, and Smerch, although originally systems like Grad used more traditional tactics.

== Self-propelled gun batteries ==
The tactic has also been adapted for more general use with self-propelled gun batteries (such as the US M109 Paladin or German PzH2000).

== AS-90 ==
A refined version are gun manoeuvre areas developed by UK for use by AS-90 batteries when the counter-battery threat is high. These areas cover several square kilometres and the guns move around in them in pairs. The difficult decision is deciding how long guns can remain in one place before moving. This requires judgement about the enemy's counter-battery responsiveness. In these areas, the battery's command elements remain in one place and there are various options for replenishing the guns' on-board ammunition. The tactic is affected by the rate of fire of the manoeuvring guns and the time it takes them to come out of action. However, it is also very wearing on the gun crews and for sustained use relief crews are essential.

== G6 Howitzer ==
South African Defence Force G6 Howitzers used the technique very effectively in Angola against Cuban forces in the Battle of Cuito Cuanavale.

== Ukraine ==
Trained by the German Bundeswehr, the Ukrainians have been using this tactic during the Russo-Ukrainian War, employing S-200 surface-to-air missile systems against Russian Beriev A-50 surveillance aircraft.

== See also ==
- Self-propelled artillery
- Counter-battery radar
- Multiple rocket launcher
- Hit-and-run tactics
