= List of explosives used during World War II =

Almost all the common explosives listed here were mixtures of several common components:

- Ammonium picrate
- TNT (Trinitrotoluene)
- PETN (Pentaerythritol tetranitrate)
- RDX
- Powdered aluminium.

This is only a partial list; there were many others. Many of these compositions are now obsolete and only encountered in legacy munitions and unexploded ordnance.

Name	Composition	Notes
Amatol	Ammonium nitrate and TNT	Extensively used in bombs, shells, depth charges and naval mines
Baronal	Barium nitrate, TNT and powdered aluminium	
Baratol	Barium nitrate and TNT	Used in British hand grenades. Also used as the low velocity explosive lens in the implosion type nuclear weapon, Fat Man
Composition A	RDX and plasticizer	Developed by the British during the war. Varieties had RDX mixed with wax or stearic acid with RDX content varying from 86% (Composition A6) up to 98.5% (composition A% type I).
Composition B	RDX, TNT and wax	Became a common military-grade explosive for the Allies during the war. Used as the high velocity explosive lens in the implosion type nuclear weapon, Fat Man.
Composition H6	45% RDX, 30% TNT, 20% powdered aluminium and 5% wax	Replaced Torpex for use in naval applications.
DBX (Depth Bomb Explosive)	21% RDX, 21% ammonium nitrate, 40% TNT, 18% powdered aluminium	An alternative for Torpex, that used less of the strategic material RDX
Minol	40% TNT, 40% ammonium nitrate and 20% powdered aluminium (Minol-2)	Developed by the British Royal Navy and used in torpedoes, depth charges and naval mines. Unsuitable for shells because of a risk of detonation if subjected to very high accelerations.
Octol	75% HMX (cyclotetramethylene-tetranitramine) and 25% TNT	Still in use
Pentolites	50% PETN and 50% TNT	
Picratol	52% ammonium picrate and 48% TNT	Used in armour-piercing shells and bombs as insensitive to shock
PIPE	81% PETN and 19% oil	
PTX-1	30% RDX, 50% tetryl and 20% TNT	
PTX-2	41-44% RDX, 26-28% PETN and 28-33% TNT	
PVA-4	90% RDX, 8% PVA and 2% dibutyl phthalate	
RIPE	85% RDX and 15% oil	
Tetrytols	70% Tetryl and 30% TNT	
Torpex	42% RDX, 40% TNT and 18% powdered aluminium	Developed for use in torpedoes, it was especially effective at producing destructive, underwater explosions.
Trialen	RDX, TNT and powdered aluminium	Used by the Luftwaffe. There were variety of versions with different proportions of the component chemicals.
Explosive “D”	Ammonium picrate	US Army/Navy
Type 91 Explosive	Trinitroanisol (TNA)	Japanese Army/Navy

Two nuclear explosives, containing mixtures of uranium and plutonium, respectively, were also used at the bombings of Hiroshima and Nagasaki

== See also ==
- List of Japanese World War II explosives
- Explosive material
- Little Boy
- Fat Man
