= Mark 81 bomb =

Mark 81 General Purpose (GP) Bomb
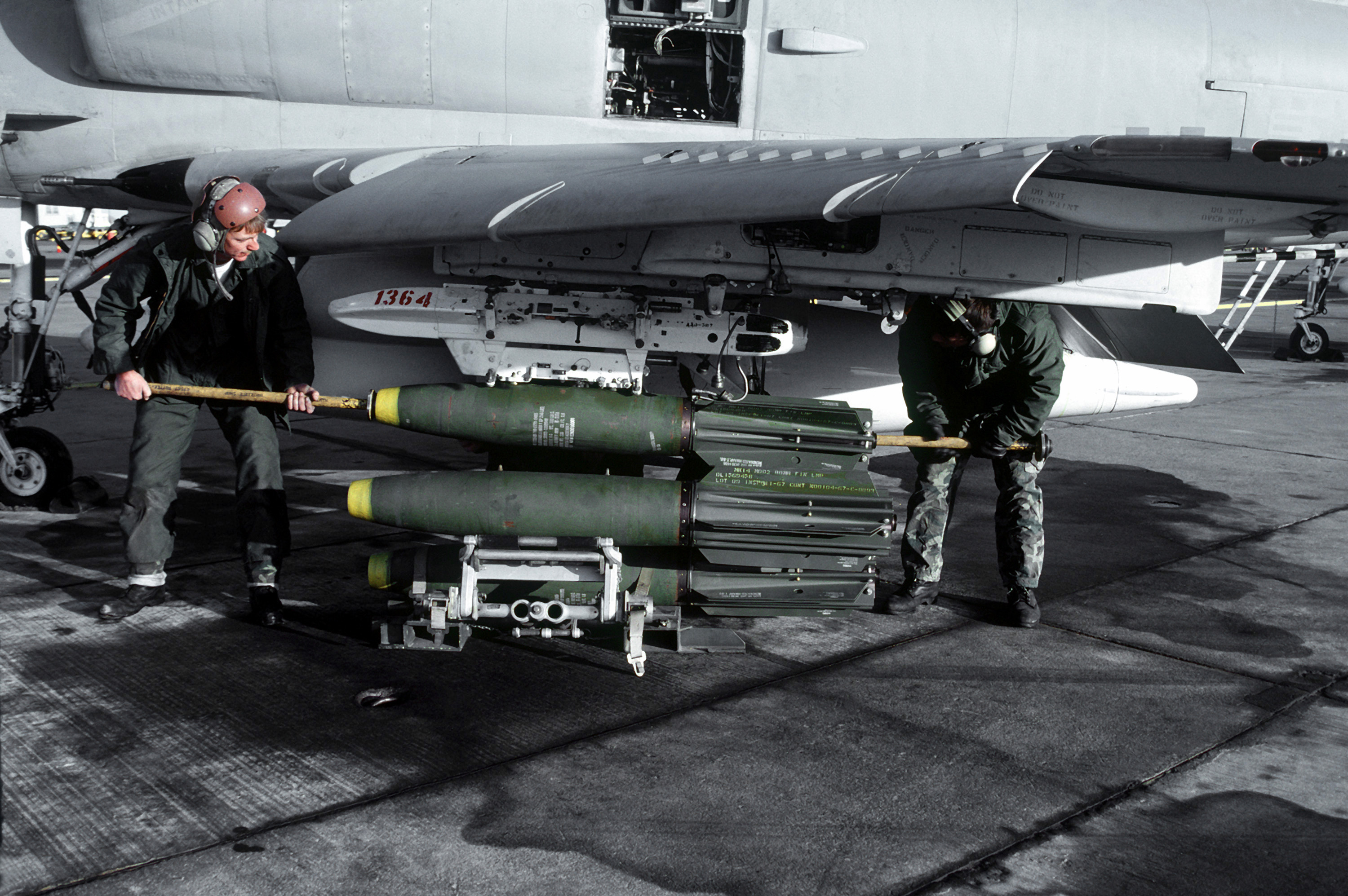
- Crewmen upload three Mark 81 general purpose high explosive bombs, with Mark 14 TRD (Tail Retarding Device) attached, aboard an A-4F Skyhawk aircraft from Marine Attack Squadron 133 (VMA-133).
- Type: Low-drag general-purpose bomb
- Place of origin: United States

Specifications
- Mass: 262 lb (119 kg)
- Length: 74 in (1.88 m)
- Diameter: 9 in (23 cm)
- Filling: Tritonal, Minol or Composition H-6
- Filling weight: 96 lb (44 kg)

The Mark 81 is a general-purpose 250-pound (110 kg) bomb (nicknamed "Firecracker"). It's the smallest of the Mark 80 series of low-drag general-purpose bombs.

== Development and deployment ==
Developed for United States military forces in the 1950s, it was first used during the Vietnam War. The bomb consists of a forged steel case with 96 pounds (44 kg) of Composition H6, Minol or Tritonal explosive. The power of the Mk 81 was found to be inadequate for U.S. military tactical use, and it was quickly discontinued, although license-built copies or duplicates of this weapon remain in service with various other nations.

Development of a precision guided variant of the Mk 81 bomb (GBU-29) was started due to its potential to reduce collateral damage compared to larger bombs, but this program has now been cancelled in favor of the Small Diameter Bomb.

== Variants ==
- Mark 81 Snakeye fitted with a Mark 14 TRD (Tail Retarding Device) to increase the bomb's drag after release. The bomb's increased air-time, coupled with its (relatively) forgiving safe drop envelope, allowed for very low-level bombing runs at slower speed. Used commonly in the close air support role in Vietnam (prior to wider availability of GBU-series precision ordnance). Nicknamed "snake", as in the typical Vietnam support loadout of "snake and nape" (250 lb Mk 81 Snakeye bombs and 100 lb AN-M47 napalm canisters).
- GBU-29 Joint Direct Attack Munition, a precision guided version of the Mark 81 (cancelled).

== Operators ==
- Iran
- Turkey: Produced under licence by MKE. Mk. 81s also integrated with LGK-81 smart bomb kit for use with TAI Hürkuş platform.
- United States

== See also ==
- Small Diameter Bomb
- Mark 82 bomb
- Mark 83 bomb
- Mark 84 bomb
