= Mark 83 bomb =

Mark 83 general-purpose bomb
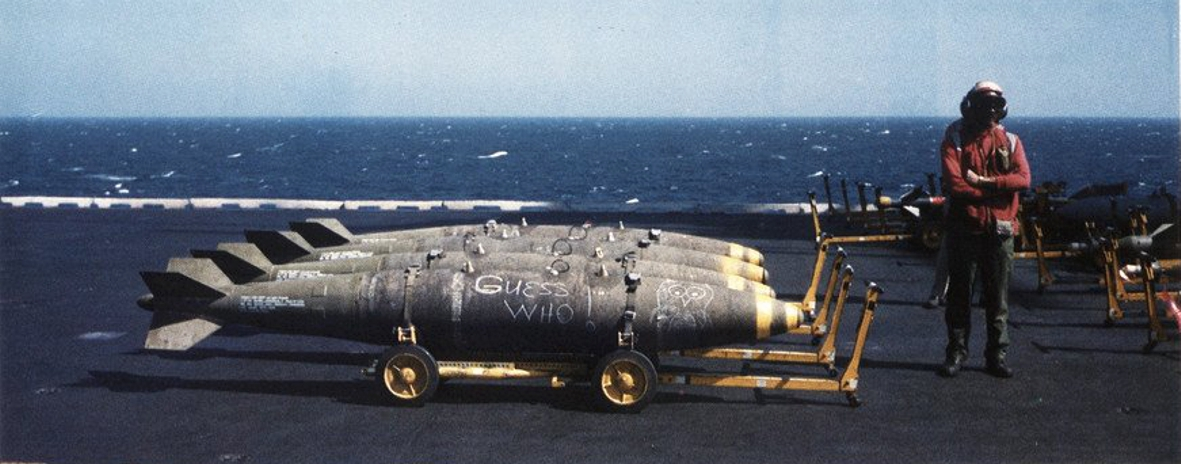
- Type: Low-drag general-purpose bomb
- Place of origin: United States

Service history
- In service: Since 1950s
- Wars: Gulf War

Production history
- Variants: GBU-16 Paveway II; GBU-32 JDAM; GBU-55 Laser JDAM

Specifications
- Mass: 985 lb (447 kg)
- Length: 9.8 ft (3 m) overall
- Diameter: 14 in (350 mm)
- Tailspan: 19 in (480 mm)
- Warhead: H6 or PBXN-109
- Warhead weight: 445 lb (202 kg)
- Detonation mechanism: M904 nose fuze and M905 tail fuze
- References: Janes

The Mark 83 is a 1,000-pound (450 kg) bomb, part of the Mark 80 series of low-drag general-purpose bombs in United States service.

== Development and deployment ==
The nominal weight of the bomb is 1,000 pounds (450 kg), although its actual weight varies between 985 pounds (447 kg) and 1,030 pounds (470 kg), depending on fuze options, and fin configuration. The Mk 83 is a streamlined steel casing containing 445 pounds (202 kg) of tritonal high explosive. When filled with PBXN-109 thermally insensitive explosive, the bomb is designated BLU-110.

The Mk 83/BLU-110 is used as the warhead for a variety of precision-guided weapons, including the GBU-16 Paveway laser-guided bombs, the GBU-32 JDAM and Quickstrike sea mines.

The Mk 83 is also used as the warhead in a variety of Pakistani smart bombs made by GIDS. During Operation Swift Retort in 2019, 2 JF-17 Thunders of the No. 16 Squadron "Black Panthers" armed with newly developed Mk. 83 Range Extension Kit (REK) bombs struck military targets in Indian-administered Jammu and Kashmir.

This bomb is most typically used by the United States Navy but is also used by the USAF in the F-22A in a JDAM configuration. According to a test report conducted by the United States Navy's Weapon System Explosives Safety Review Board (WSESRB) established in the wake of the 1967 USS Forrestal fire, the cooking-off time for a Mk 83 is approximately 8 minutes 40 seconds.

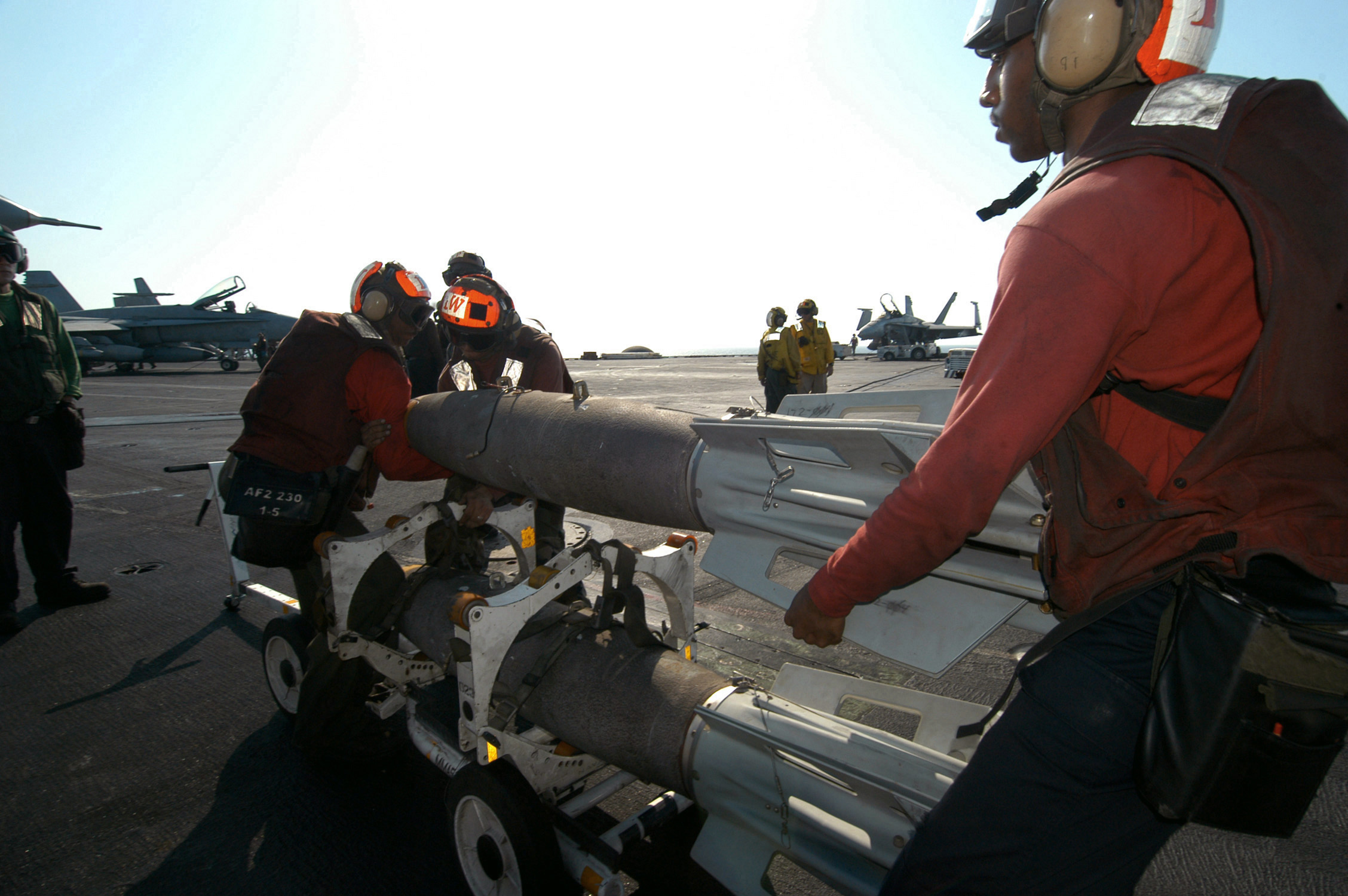
Loading of Mark 83 1,000-pound general-purpose bombs

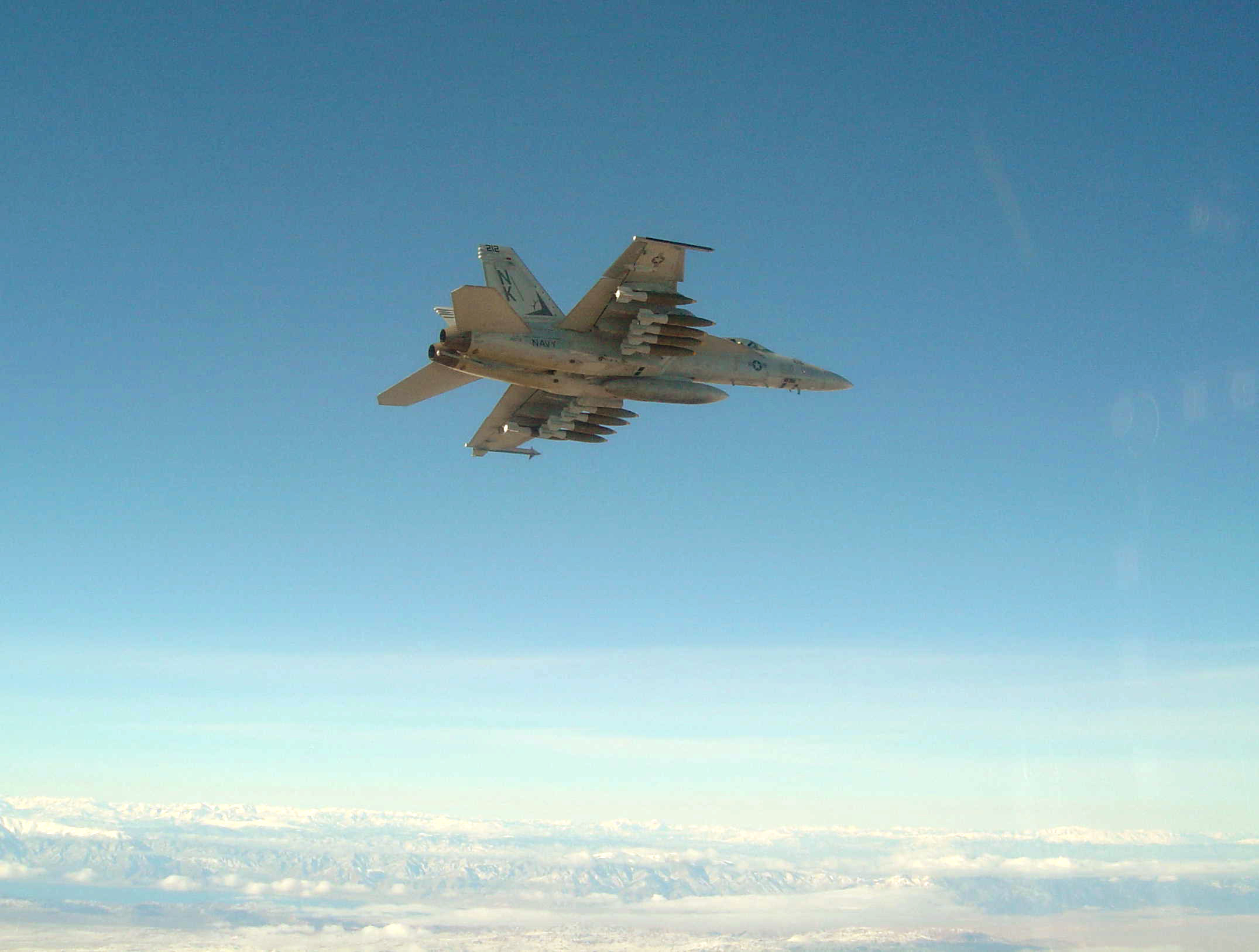
Ten Mark 83 bombs aboard a US Navy F/A-18E.

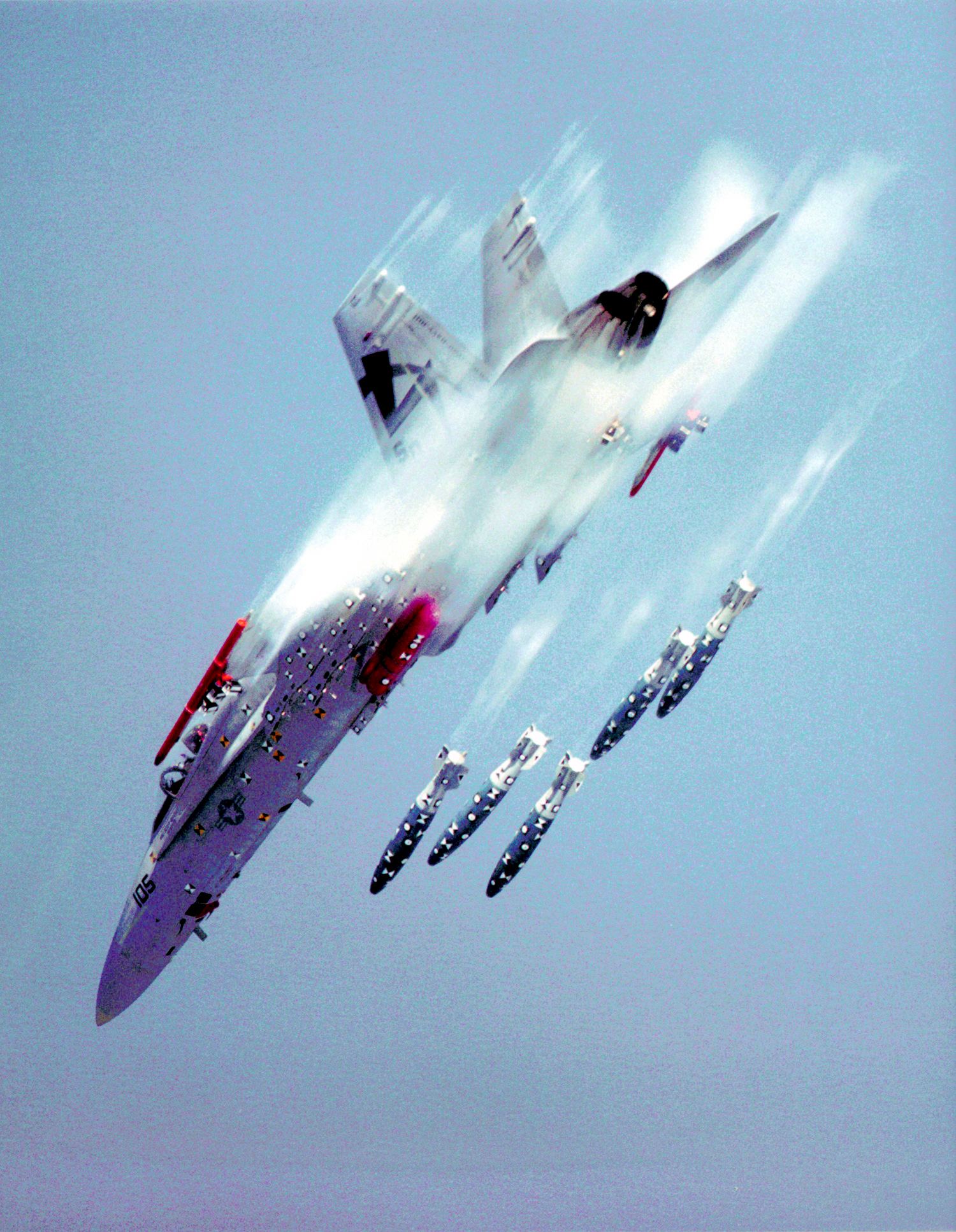
F-A-18E Super Hornet releases MK-83 1000 pound bombs during ATFLIR tests.

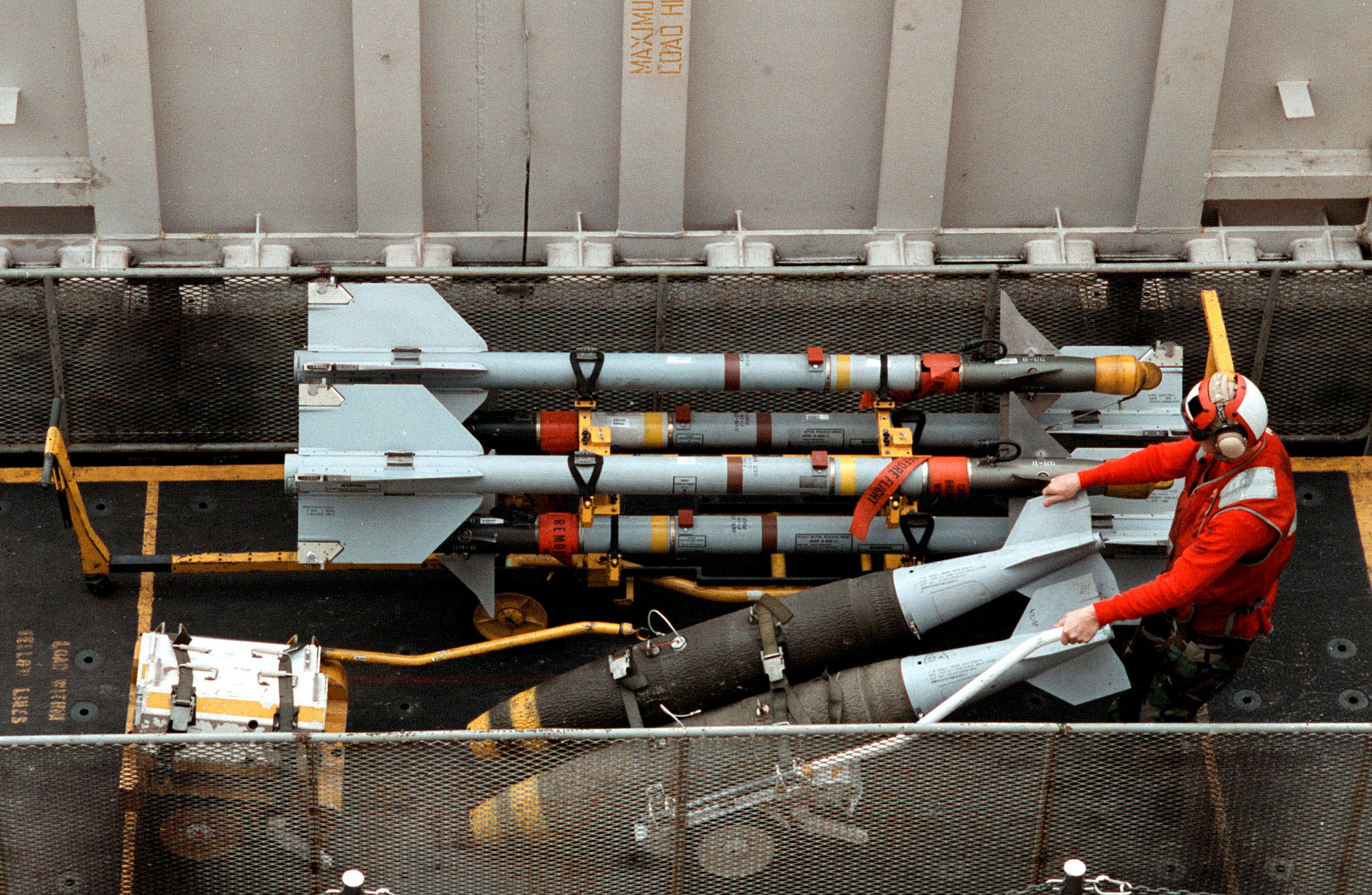
Transportation of two MK-83 1,000 pound bombs from a weapons elevator to the flight deck of the USS George Washington (CVN 73).

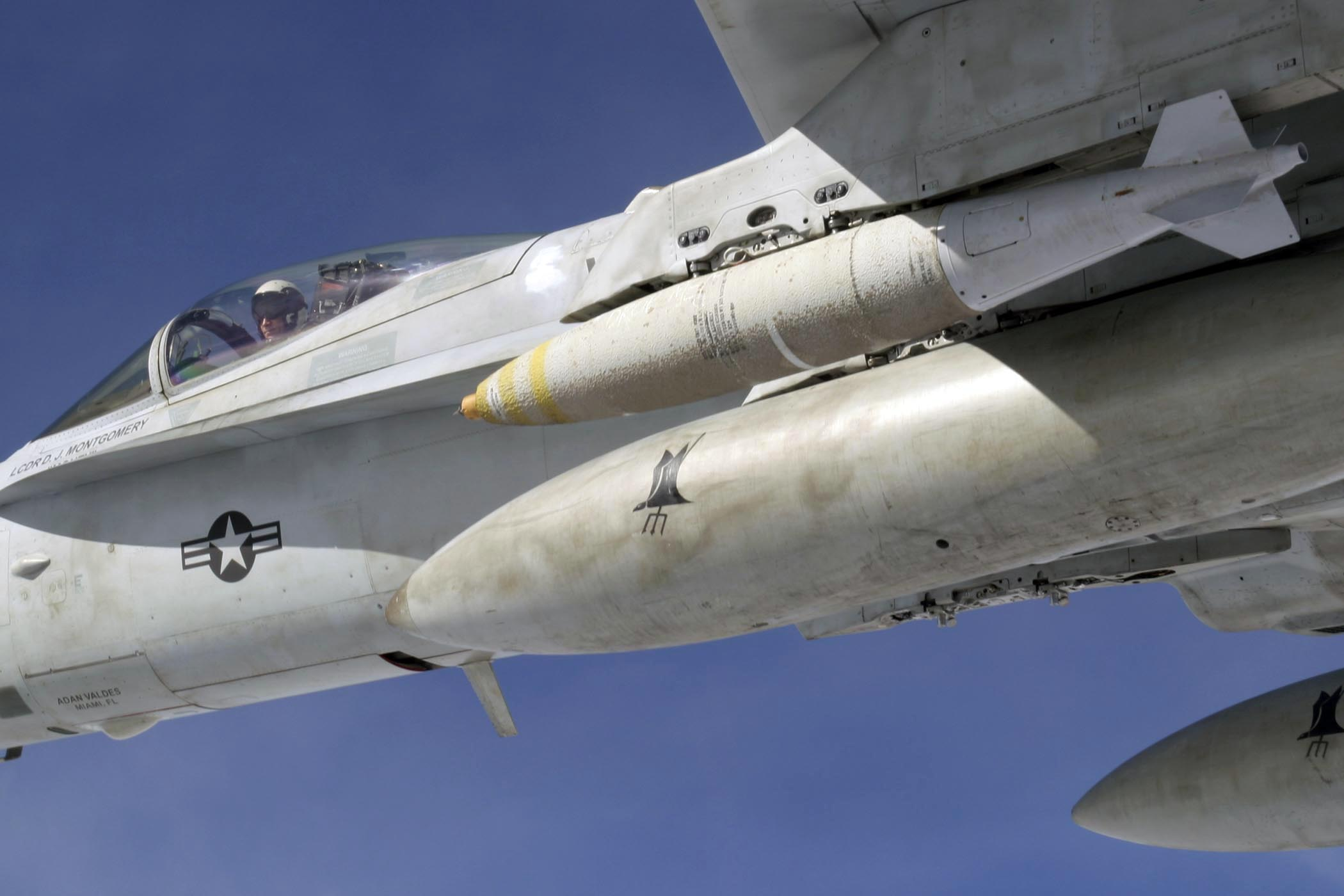
MK-83 1,000 pound bomb mounted aboard F/A-18C.

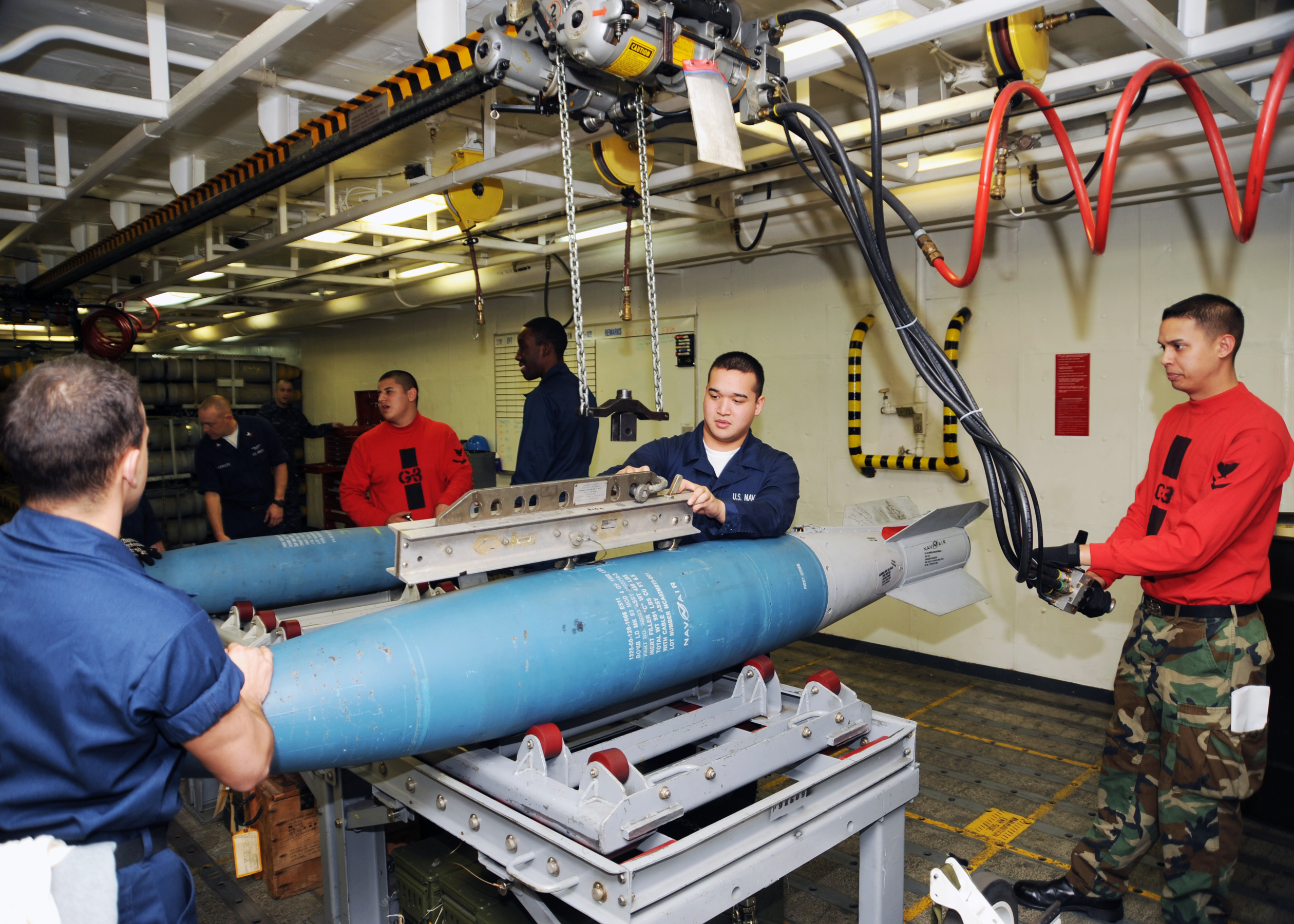
US Navy aviation-ordnancemen aboard the USS Harry S. Truman (CVN 75) preparing to move a Mark 83 inert unit from assembly line.

== See also ==
- Mark 81 bomb
- Mark 82 bomb
- Mark 84 bomb
- FAB-500 – Soviet counterpart
