= Hedgehog (weapon) =

1940s shipboard multi-barrel anti-submarine mortar weapon of British origin

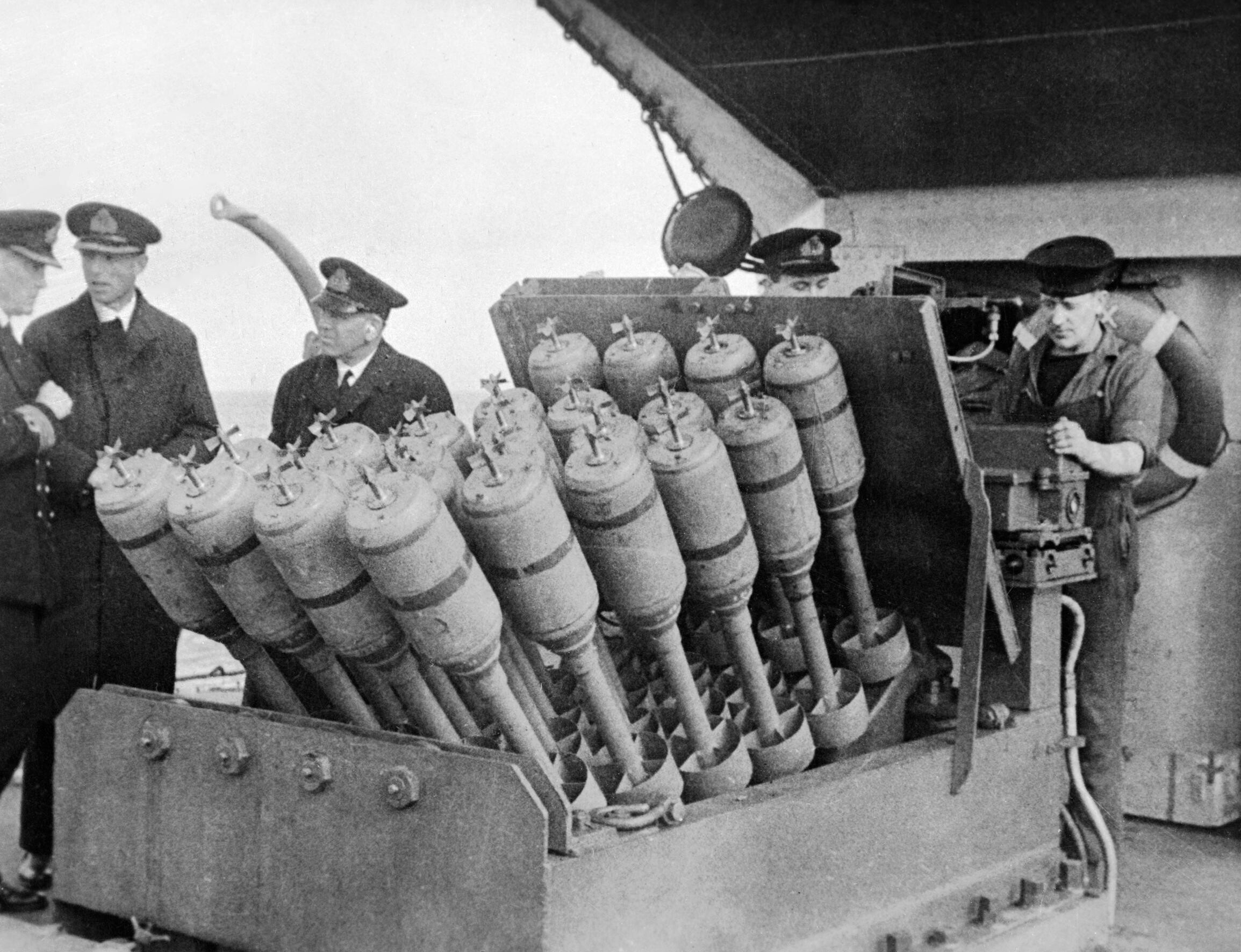
- On HMS Westcott, November 1945
- Type: Anti-submarine mortar
- Place of origin: United Kingdom

Service history
- In service: 1942 to ?
- Used by: Royal Navy; United States Navy; United States Coast Guard; Royal Canadian Navy

Production history
- Designer: Directorate of Miscellaneous Weapons Development
- Designed: 1941

Specifications
- Shell: 65 lb (29 kg)
- Calibre: 7 in (178 mm)
- Barrels: 24
- Effective firing range: 656–850 ft (200–259 m)
- Filling: 30 lb (14 kg) TNT or 35 lb (16 kg) Torpex
- Detonation mechanism: Contact

The Hedgehog (also known as an Anti-Submarine Projector) was a forward-throwing anti-submarine mortar that was used primarily during the Second World War. The device, which was developed by the Royal Navy, fired up to 24 spigot mortars ahead of a ship when attacking a U-boat. It was deployed on convoy escort warships such as destroyers and corvettes to supplement the depth charges.

As the mortar projectiles employed contact fuzes rather than time or bathymetric (depth) fuzes, detonation occurred directly against a hard surface such as the hull of a submarine, making it more deadly than depth charges, which relied on damage caused by hydrostatic shockwaves. During World War II out of 5,174 British depth charge attacks there were 85.5 kills, (Note: A "half" value indicates a kill shared with a non-British entity.) a ratio of 60.5 to 1. In comparison, the Hedgehog made 268 attacks for 47 kills, a ratio of 5.7 to 1.

== Development ==
The Hedgehog, so named because the empty rows of its launcher spigots resembled the spines on the back of a hedgehog, was a replacement for the unsuccessful Fairlie Mortar, which was secretly tested aboard HMS Whitehall in 1941. The Fairlie was designed to fire depth charges ahead of a ship when attacking a submarine. The principle of firing projectiles forwards, instead of dropping depth charges over the stern, was considered viable, despite the failure of the Fairlie. This research by the Directorate of Miscellaneous Weapons Development (DMWD) led to the development of the Hedgehog.

The weapon was a multiple spigot mortar, or spigot discharger, a type of weapon developed between the wars by Lieutenant Colonel Stewart Blacker, RA. The spigot mortar was based on early infantry trench mortars. The spigot design allowed a single device to fire warheads of different sizes. The propelling charge was part of the main weapon and worked against a rod (the spigot) set in a baseplate which fitted inside the tubular tail of the bomb. This principle was first used in the Blacker Bombard 1.1-inch (29 mm) Spigot Mortar, and it was also used in the later PIAT anti-tank weapon.

The adaptation of the bombard for naval use was made in partnership with MIR(c) under Major Millis Jefferis, who had taken Blacker's design and brought it into use with the Army. The weapon fires a salvo of 24 bombs in an arc, aimed to land in a circular or elliptical area about 100 feet (30 m) in diameter at a fixed relative location about 250 yards (230 m) directly ahead of the attacking ship. The mounting initially was fixed, but it was later replaced by a gyro-stabilised one to allow for the rolling and pitching of the attacking ship.

The system was developed to solve the problem of the target submarine disappearing from the attacking ship's ASDIC sonar when closer than the sonar's minimum range. The speed of sound in water is such that the time taken for the ping echo to return to the attacking ship from a close-by target submarine is too short to allow the human operator to distinguish the returning audible echo from the initial sound pulse emitted by the sonar – the so-called instantaneous echo, where the output sound pulse and returning echo merge, with the submarine still out of depth-charge range. A submarine in this blind spot became effectively invisible to the sonar, allowing it to make evasive manoeuvres undetected. The solution was a weapon mounted on the foredeck that discharged the projectiles up and over the ship's bow while the submarine was still detectable by the sonar, entering the water some distance in front of the ship.

== History ==
The Hedgehog entered service in 1942. Carrying a 35 lb (16 kg) Torpex charge, each mortar projectile had a diameter of 7.1 in (18 cm) and weighed about 65 lb (29.5 kg). The spigots were angled so the projectiles would land in a circular pattern with a diameter of 130 ft (40 m), about 200 yd (180 m) ahead of the ship's position. The projectiles would then sink at about 23 ft/s (7 m/s). They would reach a submerged U-boat, for example at 200 ft (60 m) in under 9 seconds. Sympathetic detonation of projectiles near those contacting hard surfaces was a possibility, but the number of explosions counted was usually fewer than the number of projectiles launched. The prototype launcher was tested aboard HMS Westcott in 1941, but there were no submarine kills until November 1942, after it had been installed aboard one hundred ships.

Initial success rates, of about 5%, were only slightly better than depth charges. Swells and spray frequently covered the launcher during heavy North Atlantic weather, and subsequent attempts to launch from the soaked launcher were often hindered by firing circuit problems, launching an incomplete pattern.

A depth charge total miss would still produce an explosion, leading crews to think that they might have damaged their target or at least demoralised its personnel; a Hedgehog miss was discouragingly quiet. The Royal Navy launched Hedgehog so seldom in early 1943 that a directive was issued ordering captains of ships equipped with Hedgehog to report why they had not used Hedgehog on an underwater contact. The results were blamed on crew inexperience and low confidence in the weapon. However, after an officer from the DMWD was sent to the base at Londonderry, where the escort vessels were based, with better training and shipwide talks on examples of successful Hedgehog attacks, the kill rate improved considerably. By the end of the war, statistics showed that on average, one in every five attacks made by Hedgehog resulted in a kill (compared with fewer than one in eighty with depth charges).

In response to this new deadly threat to its U-boats, the Kriegsmarine brought forward its programme of acoustic torpedoes in 1943, beginning with the Falke. These new "homing" acoustic torpedoes could be employed effectively without the use of a periscope, providing submarines a better chance to remain undetected and evade counterattack.

In the Pacific Theatre, USS England sank six Japanese submarines in a two-week period with the Hedgehog in May 1944.

In 1946, the destroyer escort USS Solar was destroyed while unloading ammunition when a crewman accidentally dropped a Hedgehog charge near one of her main turret ammunition rooms, triggering three devastating explosions that wrecked the superstructure.

== Operational usage ==
The launcher had four "cradles", each with six launcher spigots. The firing sequence was staggered so all the bombs would land at about the same time. This had the added advantage of minimising the stress on the weapon's mounting so that deck reinforcement was not needed, allowing the weapon to be easily fitted at any convenient place on a ship. Reloading took about three minutes.

The advantages of the Hedgehog were that an unsuccessful attack does not hide the submarine from Asdic (sonar). When a depth charge explodes, it can take 15 minutes before the water disturbance can settle down enough that Asdic becomes effective again. Many submarines escaped during the time after an unsuccessful depth charge attack. Since Hedgehog charges explode on contact, Asdic tracking of the submarine is less likely to be disrupted by a failed Hedgehog attack. Proximity weapons like depth charges need to be set for the target's depth to work. Contact-fuzed charges do not and an explosion at the time predicted for the contact-fuzed projectile to reach the target depth may indicate a "hit". Although knowledge of target depth was less important, the Hedgehog was less successful against deep targets. Experience discouraged its use on targets deeper than 400 ft (120 m).

Until depth-finding sonar became available (the first was the British Q attachment in 1943) there was a "dead period" during the final moments before a depth-charge attack began when contact with the target would be lost. U-boat commanders became adept at sharp changes of course and speed at these moments to break contact and escape. Hedgehog remained usable while the submarine was detectable by sonar giving it no time to take evasive actions. A hit by a Hedgehog bomb was usually sufficient to sink a U-boat.

Many depth charges were required to inflict enough cumulative damage to sink a U-boat; even then, many survived hundreds of detonations over a period of many hours. U-427 survived 678 depth charges dropped against it in April 1945. The effectiveness of the depth charge was reduced because they detonated at a set depth at a distance away from the submarine, the explosive shock was rapidly dissipated by a cushion of water between it and the target. The Hedgehog charge exploded on contact and misses with the Hedgehog were silent and did not cause any damage, unlike the cumulative damage caused by depth charging, nor did it have the same psychological effect as a depth charge attack.

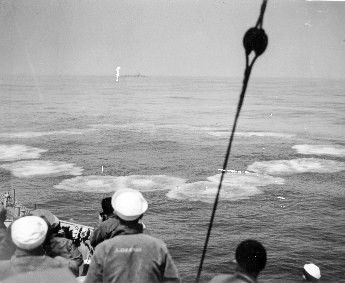
USS Moberly makes a Hedgehog attack against U-853 in 1945.

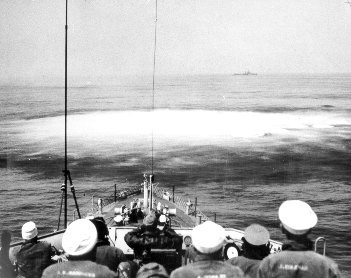
A large white upwelling of water from an underwater explosion just ahead of Moberly's bow following Hedgehog launch

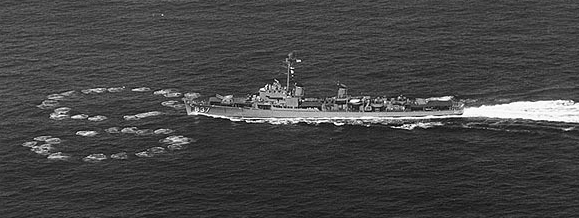
USS Sarsfield after firing dual Hedgehogs, 1950

== Derivatives and successors ==
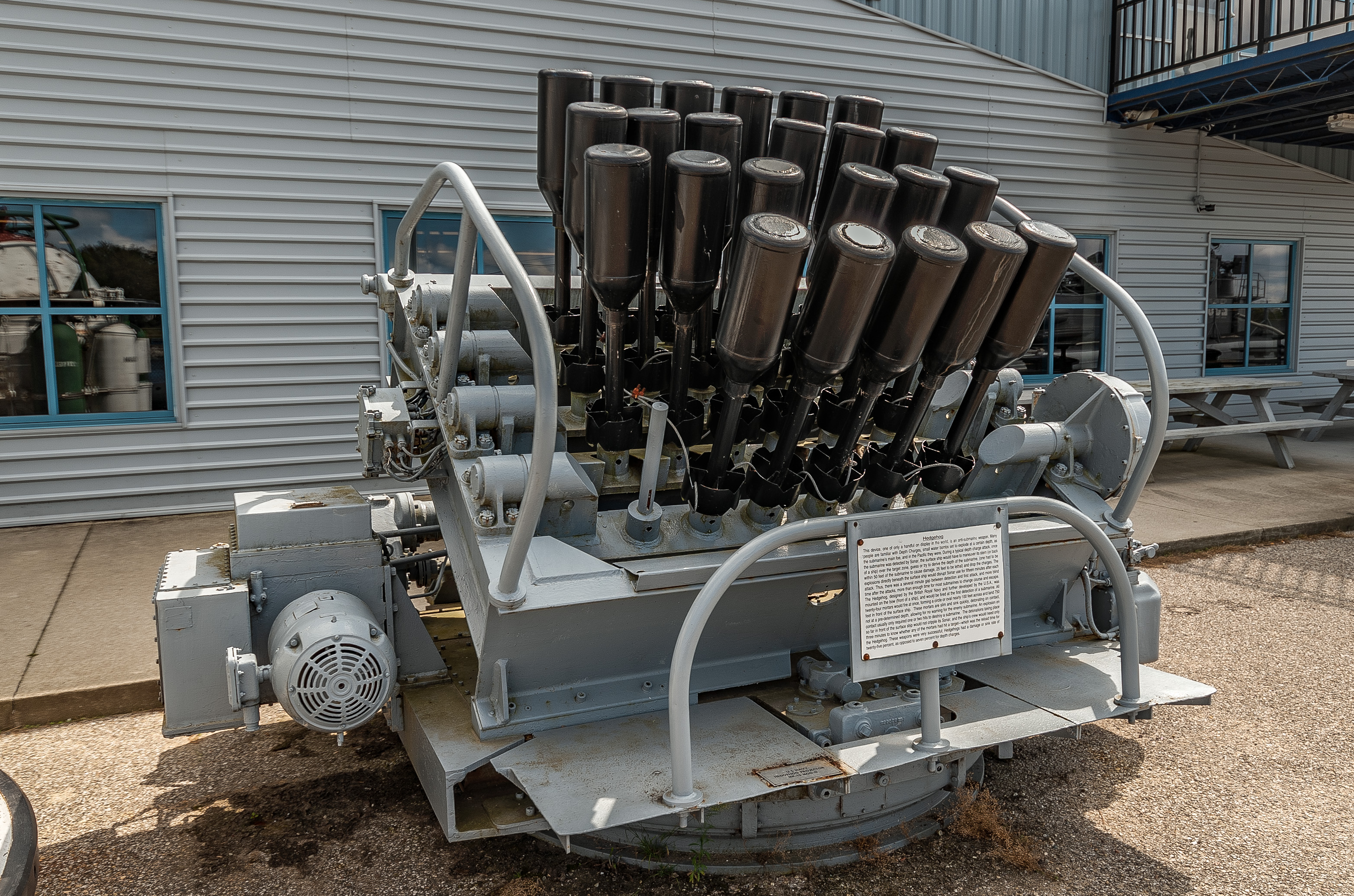
A Mark-15 Hedgehog launcher on display at the USS Silversides museum in Muskegon, Michigan

In late 1943, the Royal Navy introduced the Squid, a three-tubed mortar that launched depth charges. Initially it was used as a single weapon, but when this failed to be successful, it was upgraded to the "double squid" that consisted of two launchers placed in parallel. In 1955 this system was upgraded to the three-barrelled Limbo that launched 400 lb (180 kg) Minol charges.

The United States produced a rocket version of the Hedgehog called Mousetrap, then Weapon Alpha as a replacement for both. Still, the Hedgehog remained in service with the United States Navy into the Cold War until both it and the less satisfactory Weapon Alpha were replaced by ASROC.

Three "Hedgerow" flotillas of specialized Landing Craft Assault boats carrying the Hedgehog instead of troops were used during the Normandy landings. An addition of impact fuse extensions in the projectile noses enabled detonating the warheads above ground. The bombs were used to clear 100-yard-wide paths through mines and barbed wire obstacles on the beach.

The Australian Army adapted the marine Hedgehog into a land-based seven-shot launcher that could be mounted on the back of Matilda tanks. In 1949, a copy of the Hedgehog was created in the USSR called the MBU-200, which was then developed in 1956 into the MBU-600 with an increased range of 2,113 ft (644 m). Weapons derived from the Hedgehog have been largely phased out from Western navies in favor of homing torpedoes, and in Russia and India by anti-submarine rocket launchers like the RBU-6000.

== Former operators ==
- Royal Navy
- Spanish Navy
- United States Navy
- Royal Canadian Navy
- United States Coast Guard
- Philippine Navy
- Royal Danish Navy

== General characteristics ==
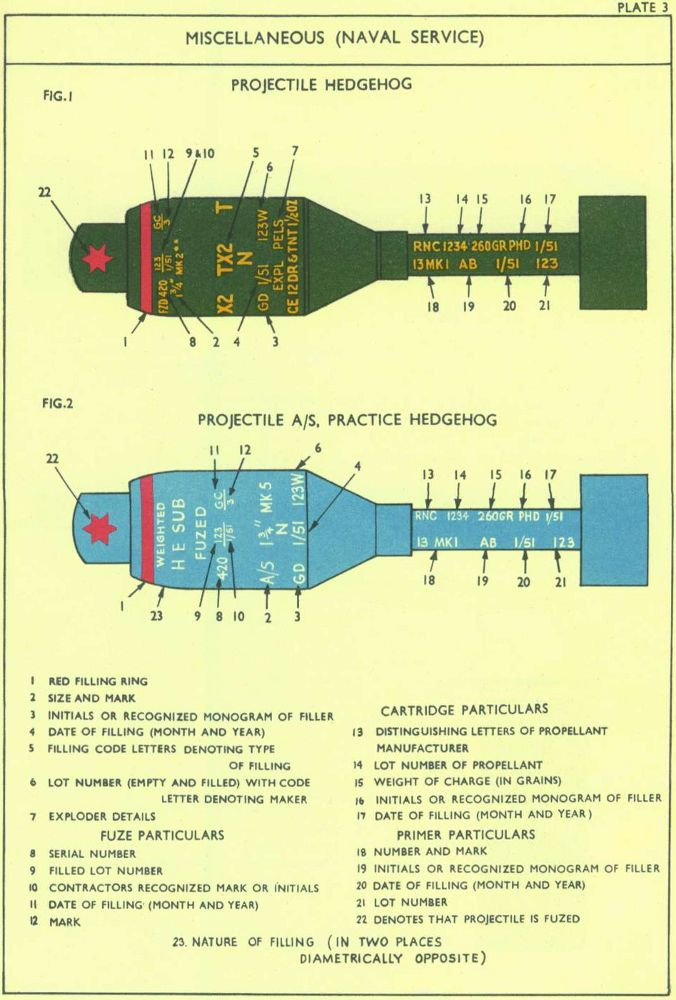
Live and practice projectiles – note the protective fuze caps (22) shown removed in the picture at the top of page.

Ammunition

- Weight: 65 lb (29 kg)
- Shell diameter : 7.2 in (183 mm)
- Shell length: 3 ft 10.5 in (1,181 mm)
- Explosive charge: 30 lb (14 kg) TNT or 35 lb (16 kg) Torpex
- Range: about 250 yd (230 m)
- Sinking speed: 22 to 23.5 ft/s (6.7 to 7.2 m/s)
- Fuze: Contact, high explosive

Launcher

- Firing order: Ripple in pairs, one every tenth of a second
- Reload time: ~3 minutes

=== Variants ===
- Mark 10: elliptical pattern measuring about 140 by 120 feet (43 m × 37 m) to a range of 200 yards (180 m).
- Mark 11: circular pattern measuring 200 feet (60 m) in diameter out to a range of about 188 yards (172 m).
- Mark 15: pattern as for the Mark 11 but mounted on a platform adapted from that of a quadruple 40 mm Bofors gun mount. The Mark 15 could be fired remotely from the ship's plotting room.
