= Timeline of explosives =

This timeline lists the development of explosives and related events.

== Timeline ==
Year(s)	Event	Source
1st millennium	Gunpowder, the first explosive, is developed.	
1040–1044	The book Wujing Zongyao contains three formulas for gunpowder, the first such reference.	
1267	Roger Bacon's Opus Majus contains the first European reference to gunpowder.	
1659	Ammonium nitrate is first synthesized by Johann Rudolf Glauber; it was not used as an explosive until World War I.	
1745	William Watson shows that an electric spark can ignite gunpowder, demonstrating the first detonator.	
1845	Nitrocellulose is invented by Christian Schoenbein.	
1846	Nitroglycerin is invented by Ascanio Sobrero. It is the first practical explosive stronger than gunpowder.	
1863	TNT is invented by Julius Wilbrand, but used only as a yellow dye.	
Sep 3, 1864	A nitroglycerin explosion at Immanuel Nobel's factory kills Alfred Nobel's youngest brother Emil Oskar Nobel and five other factory workers.	
Nov 28, 1864	Alfred Nobel establishes his first company, Nitroglycerin Aktiebolaget, the first commercial manufacturer of nitroglycerin.	
1865	Alfred Nobel develops a detonator using mercury fulminate in a copper capsule to detonate nitroglycerin.	
1866	Dynamite is invented by Alfred Nobel by mixing nitroglycerin with silica. It is the first safely manageable explosive stronger than gunpowder.	
1867	The use of ammonium nitrate in explosives is patented in Sweden.	
1875	Gelignite, the first plastic explosive, is invented by Alfred Nobel.	
1884	Paul Marie Eugène Vieille creates Poudre B, the first practical smokeless powder.	
1891	The explosive properties of TNT are discovered by Carl Häussermann.	
1894	PETN is patented by the Rheinisch-Westfälische Sprengstoff A.G.	
1898	RDX is invented by Georg Friedrich Henning, but not used until World War II.	
1906	Dunnite is invented by US Army Major Beverly W. Dunn.	
1908	The first detonating cord, a lead tube filled with TNT, is patented in France.	
Dec 6, 1917	Halifax Explosion: A cargo of TNT, picric acid, benzol, and guncotton aboard a ship explodes after a collision, killing at least 1,782 people. It was the largest artificial explosion at the time.	
Apr 16, 1947	Texas City disaster: 2,100 metric tons of ammonium nitrate aboard a docked ship explode, ultimately killing at least 581 people, the deadliest industrial accident in U.S. history.	
1952	Semtex, a general-purpose plastic explosive containing RDX and PETN, is invented by Stanislav Brebera.	
1955	ANFO is developed, consisting of 94% ammonium nitrate.	
1956	C-4 is developed as part of the Composition C family of plastic explosives; it contains 91% RDX.	
Aug 4, 2020	Beirut explosion: A large amount of ammonium nitrate explodes, causing at least 218 deaths.	

== See also ==
- History of gunpowder
- Timeline of the gunpowder age
- Largest artificial non-nuclear explosions
- List of ammonium nitrate disasters
- List of explosives used during World War II

== Sources ==
- Padmanabhan, Thanu (2019), The Dawn of Science: Glimpses from History for the Curious Mind, Bibcode:2019dsgh.book.....P
- Romane, Julian (2020), The First & Second Italian Wars 1494-1504
