= Blockbuster bomb =

Large conventional bombs used in World War II by the Royal Air Force

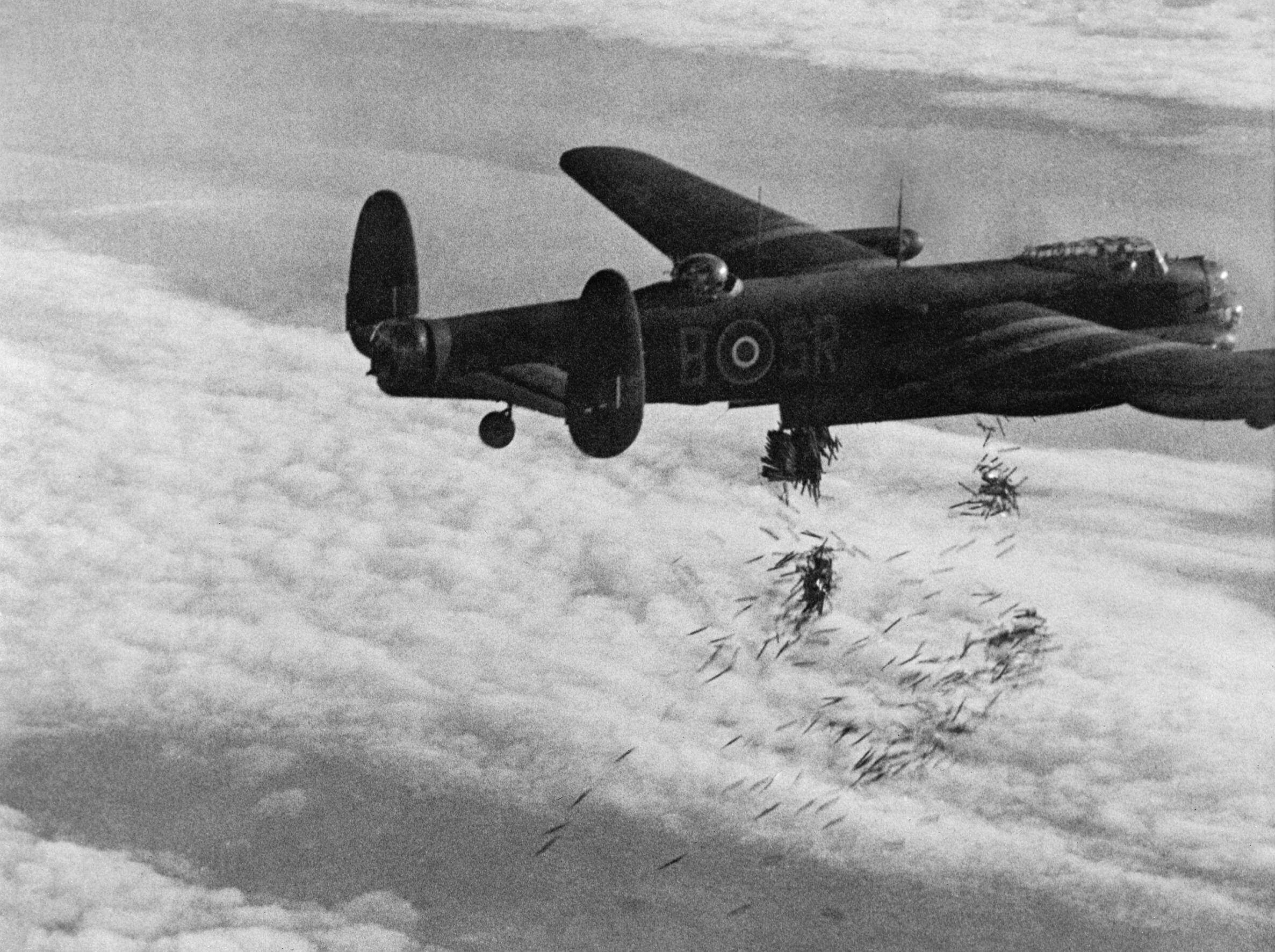
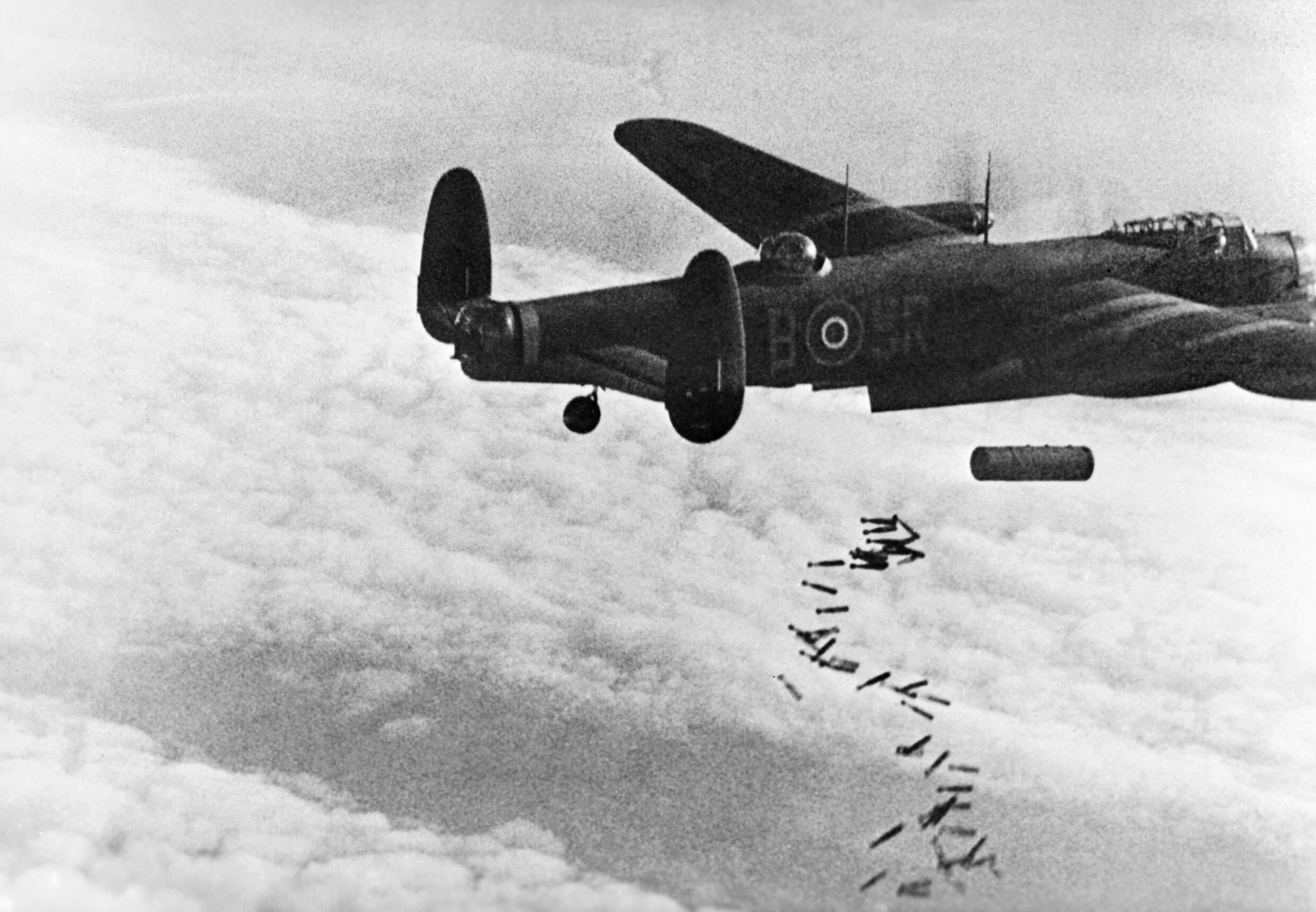
A Lancaster drops 4 lb (left) and 30 lb (14 kg) incendiary bombs and a 4,000 pound blockbuster bomb and incendiary bombs during Operation Hurricane against Duisburg on 14/15 October 1944

A blockbuster bomb or cookie was one of several of the largest conventional bombs used in World War II by the Royal Air Force (RAF). The term blockbuster was originally a name coined by the press and referred to a bomb which had enough explosive power to destroy an entire street or large building through the effects of blast in conjunction with incendiary bombs.

== Design ==
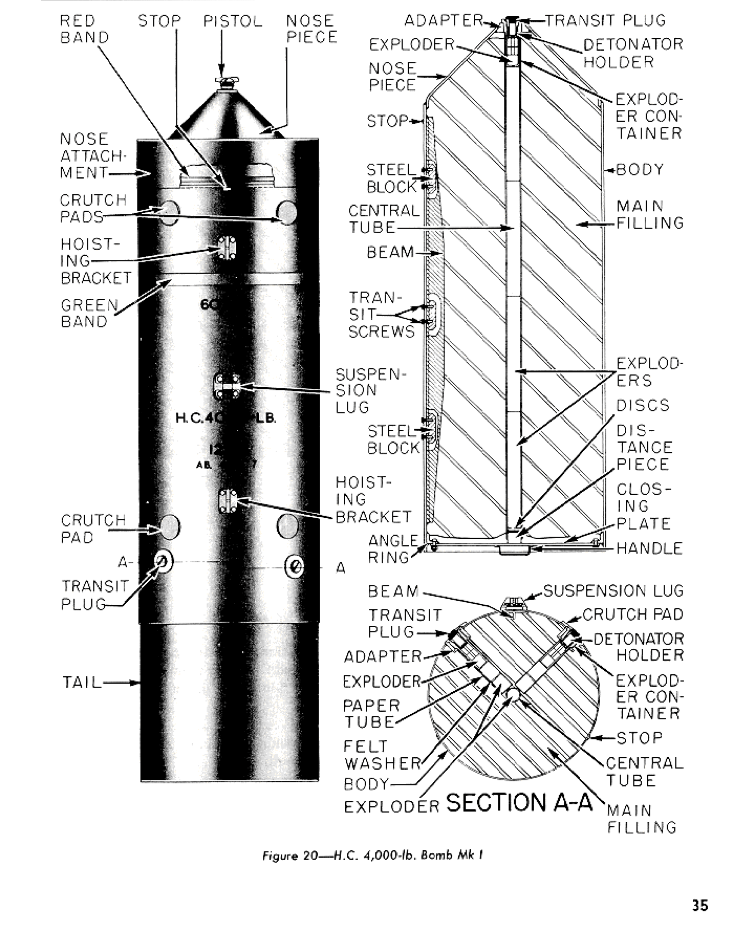
Diagram of a 4,000 lb HC Mark I bomb

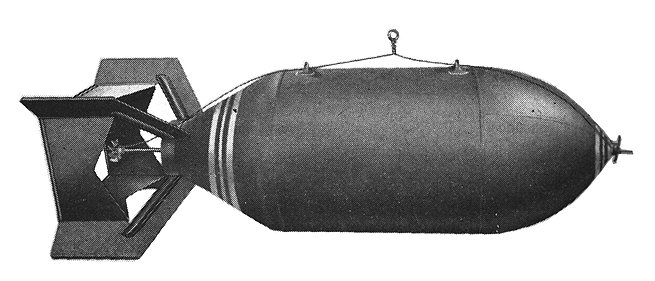
Standard American AN-M56 4,000 lb (1.8 t) general-purpose bomb

Blockbuster bombs were the RAF's high capacity (HC) bombs. Their especially thin casings allowed them to contain approximately three-quarters of their weight in explosive, with a 4,000 lb bomb (nominal weight) containing about 3,000 lb (1,400 kg) Amatol, RDX or Torpex. Most general-purpose bombs, termed medium capacity (MC) by the RAF, contained 50% explosive by weight; the remainder consisted primarily of the fragmentation casing. Blockbusters increased in size as the war progressed, rising from the original 4,000 lb (1,800 kg) version to up to 12,000 lb (5,400 kg).

The 4000 lb HC Mark I bomb – actual weight around 3,930 lb (1,780 kg) – was a welded, cylindrical shell of 0.31 in (7.9 mm) thick steel. The body of the bomb was 30 in (76 cm) in diameter and 88 in (2.24 m) long with a conical nose. It had a 27 in (69 cm) long lightweight, empty cylindrical tail onto which a closed end was fitted, amounting to a total length of 115 in (2.92 m). A T-section steel beam was welded to the inner surface of the bomb to strengthen it. Subsequent Mark II and Mark III HC bombs differed in detail; the conical nose was replaced with a domed nose and the number of fuzes was increased from one to three to guarantee detonation. The Mark IV bomb did not have the T-section beam and the Mark V and Mark VI bombs were versions manufactured in the United States.

The larger 8,000 lb (3.6 t) bomb was constructed from two 4,000 lb (1.8 t) sections, of a larger 38 in (0.97 m) diameter, that fitted together with bolts. A 12,000 lb (5,400 kg) version was created by adding a third 4000 lb section and should not be confused with the 12,000lb Tallboy ground-penetrating "earthquake" bomb.

The 4000 lb high-capacity design was little more than a cylinder full of explosives: it was un-aerodynamic and lacked fins. The comparable American "4,000 pound LC Bomb AN-M56" was – like other US bombs – aerodynamically designed, with a sheet metal tailfin assembly and shaped nose and aft sections. When fitted with a conical nose and a drum tail, the 1,800 kg (2 short tons) blockbuster bomb would fall straight down. These bombs were designed for their blast effect, to cause damage to buildings, specifically to blow roof tiles off, so that the following barrage of small 4 lb (1.8 kg) incendiary bombs could reach the building interiors unimpeded. In contrast to the American AN-M56 ordnance, cylindrical HC-class bombs were used only by the RAF and associated Commonwealth air forces, the only air forces whose bombers had bomb bays large enough to hold them.

In 1947 Alfred Cecil Brooks of Stourbridge was appointed a Member of the Order of the British Empire, for creating the Blockbuster, although his citation was worded "outstanding services to the King of a nature that cannot be revealed". The local newspaper referred to him as "Blockbuster Brooks".

== Operational use ==
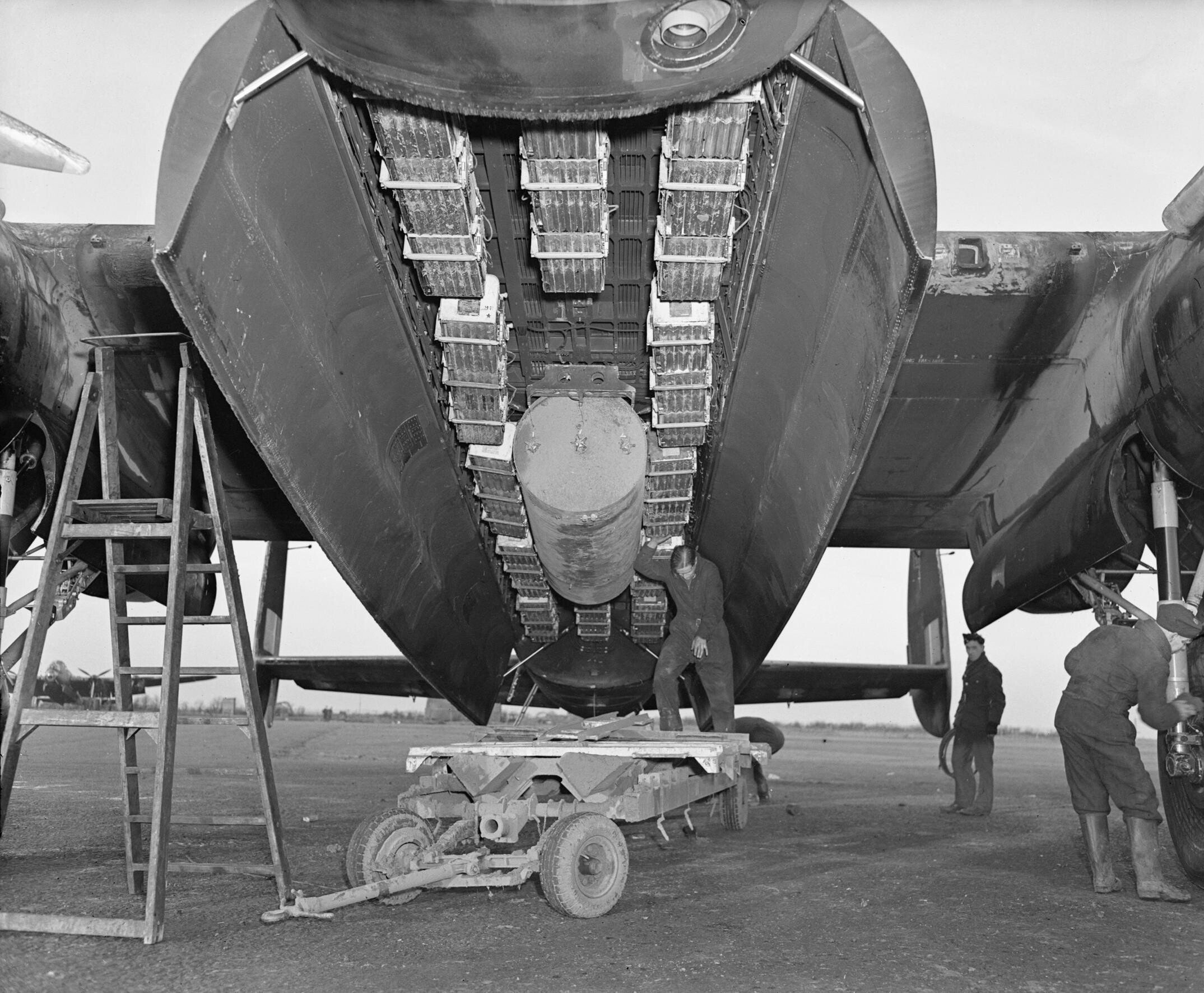
57 Squadron Avro Lancaster with the "Usual" area bombing load of a 4,000 lb (1.8 t) bomb and 12 Small Bomb Containers, each filled with 4 lb (1.8 kg) incendiary bombs

The first type of aircraft to carry 4,000 lb (1.8 t) bombs operationally was the Wellington during a strike on Emden in April 1941; carriage of the bomb required the bomb beam to be removed from the bomb bay and a slot cut in the bomb doors – the bomb protruded slightly through this and, on release, simply fell out through the hole. The bomb later became part of the standard bomb load of the RAF's heavy night bombers and Mosquitoes of the Light Night Strike Force, whose aircraft would sometimes bomb Berlin twice in one night, flown by two different crews.

The 2,000 lb HC was used until the end of the war, its usage peaking in 1944 with over 16,000 dropped.

The 8,000 lb (3.6 t) and the 12,000 lb (5.4 t) could be carried only by the Avro Lancaster which needed to be slightly modified with bulged bomb-bay doors. The 8,000 lb bomb could also be carried by Handley Page Halifax, starting from B.Mk.II Series IA, but this was rarely used, since the bomb doors could not be fully closed.

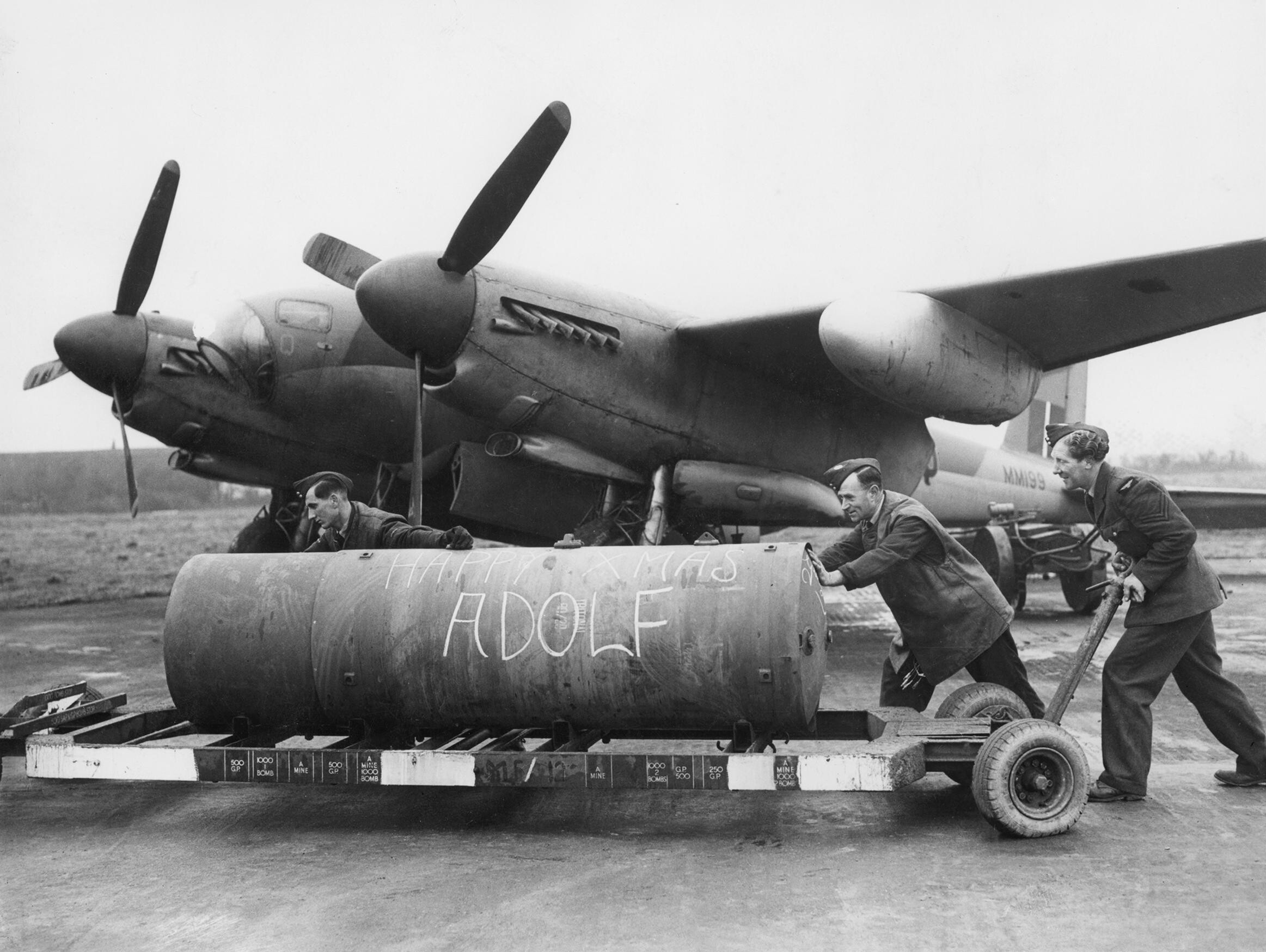
A 4,000 lb HC bomb, marked "Happy Xmas Adolf" being loaded onto a de Havilland Mosquito of No. 128 Squadron RAF

The first use of the 8,000 lb (3.6 t) HC was by 15 Squadron Lancasters against Berlin on 2 December 1943. Bad weather and other factors meant their effectiveness was not noted.

The 4,000 lb (1.8 t) "cookie" was regarded as a particularly dangerous load to carry. Due to the airflow over the detonating pistols fitted in the nose, it would often explode even if dropped in a supposedly "safe" unarmed state. The safe height above ground for dropping the "cookie" was 6,000 ft (1,800 m); any lower and the dropping aircraft risked being damaged by the explosion's atmospheric shock wave:

We were flying at 6,000 feet which was the minimum height to drop the 4,000 pounder. We dropped it in the middle of town [Koblenz], which gave the aircraft a hell of a belt, lifted it up and blew an escape hatch from out of the top.

— Jack Murray, pilot of "G for George", reporting on G for George's mission on 17th April 1943.

617 Squadron developed a technique of dropping a 1,000 lb MC bomb just before a 12,000 lb HC bomb. The shock wave from the 1,000 lb explosion fired the pistols on the 12,000 lb bomb, causing an "air burst"; this technique was used successfully in attacks including the Michelin factory at Clermont-Ferrand in March 1944.

== Post-war unexploded ordnance ==
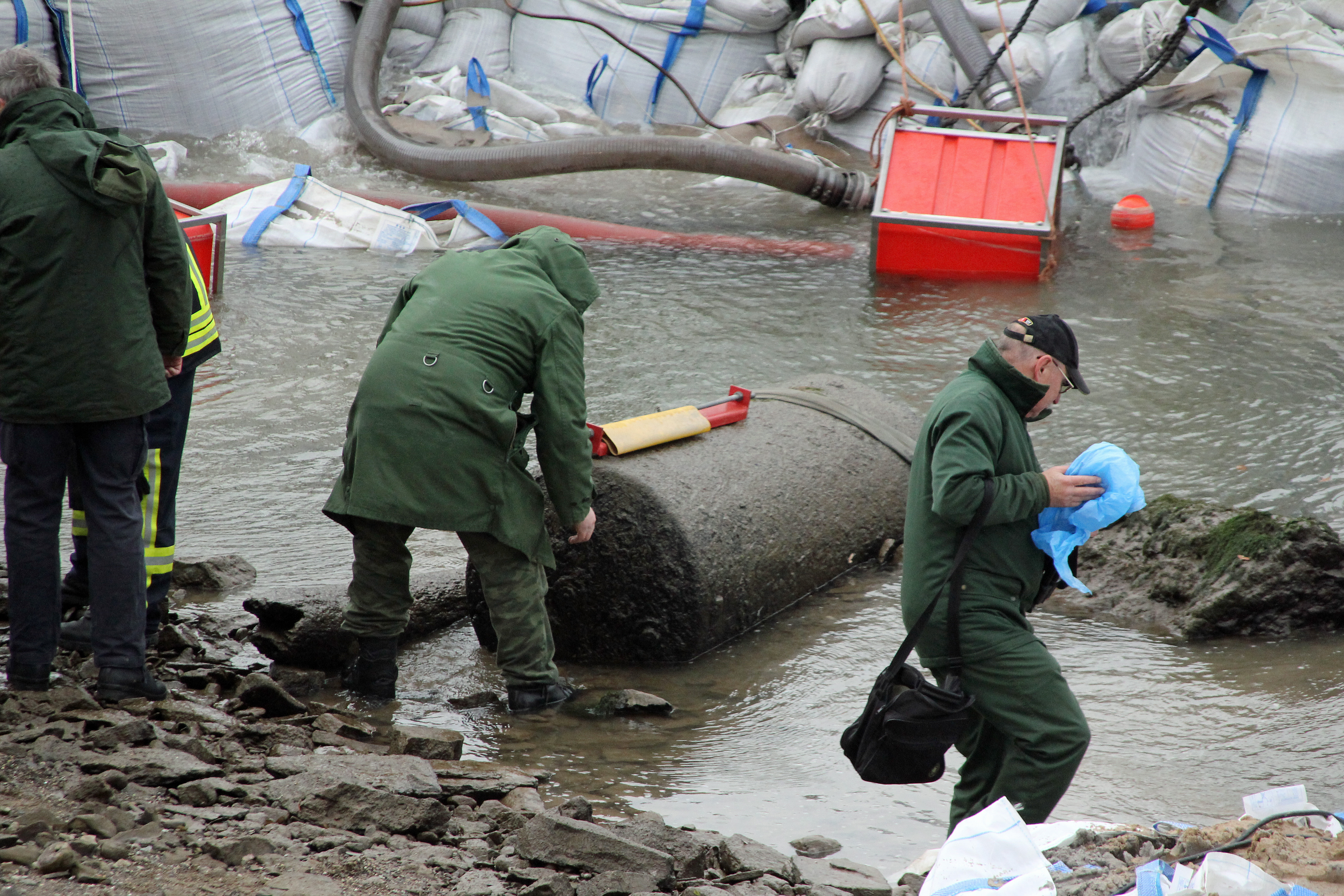
Disposal of a 4,000 lb (1.8 t) blockbuster dropped by the RAF during World War II. Found in the Rhine near Koblenz, 4 December 2011.

An unusual dry period led to low river levels in the Rhine in December 2011, exposing a 4,000 lb HC bomb in the riverbed near Koblenz. A radius of 2 kilometres (1.2 mi) around the bomb site (containing about 45,000 people) was evacuated while the bomb was defused. Another unexploded blockbuster was found in Dortmund in November 2013, requiring the evacuation of more than 20,000 people from the area. Other bombs were found and defused in Vicenza on 29 April 2001 and 25 April 2014. In 2001, defusing operations required the evacuation of 70,000 within a radius of 3 km (1.9 mi), while in 2014 defusing operations required the evacuation of 30,000 within a radius of 2.5 km (1.6 mi).

On 19 December 2016, a British bomb identified as a 4,000 lb HC blockbuster was discovered in Augsburg, Germany. It was defused on Christmas Day, requiring evacuation of more than 54,000 people within a radius of 1.5 km.

On 29 August 2017, another British HC 4000 lb bomb was discovered during construction work near the Goethe University in Frankfurt, requiring the evacuation of approximately 65,000 people within a radius of 1.5 km (0.93 mi). This was the largest evacuation in Germany since the Second World War.

On 8 April 2018, an HC 4000 lb bomb was discovered during gardening jobs in Paderborn, near the local university, leading to the evacuation of 26,400 people while the bomb was defused.

On 20 March 2024, a MK IV bomb was found in a construction site in Viterbo, Italy causing an evacuation of more than 30,000 people in a range of 1,400 metres (4,600 ft) from the discovery site.

On 17 May 2026, a 4000 lb bomb was defused in Pforzheim, after it was found on May 13 in a construction site. Almost 30,000 people were evacuated.

== Bombs ==
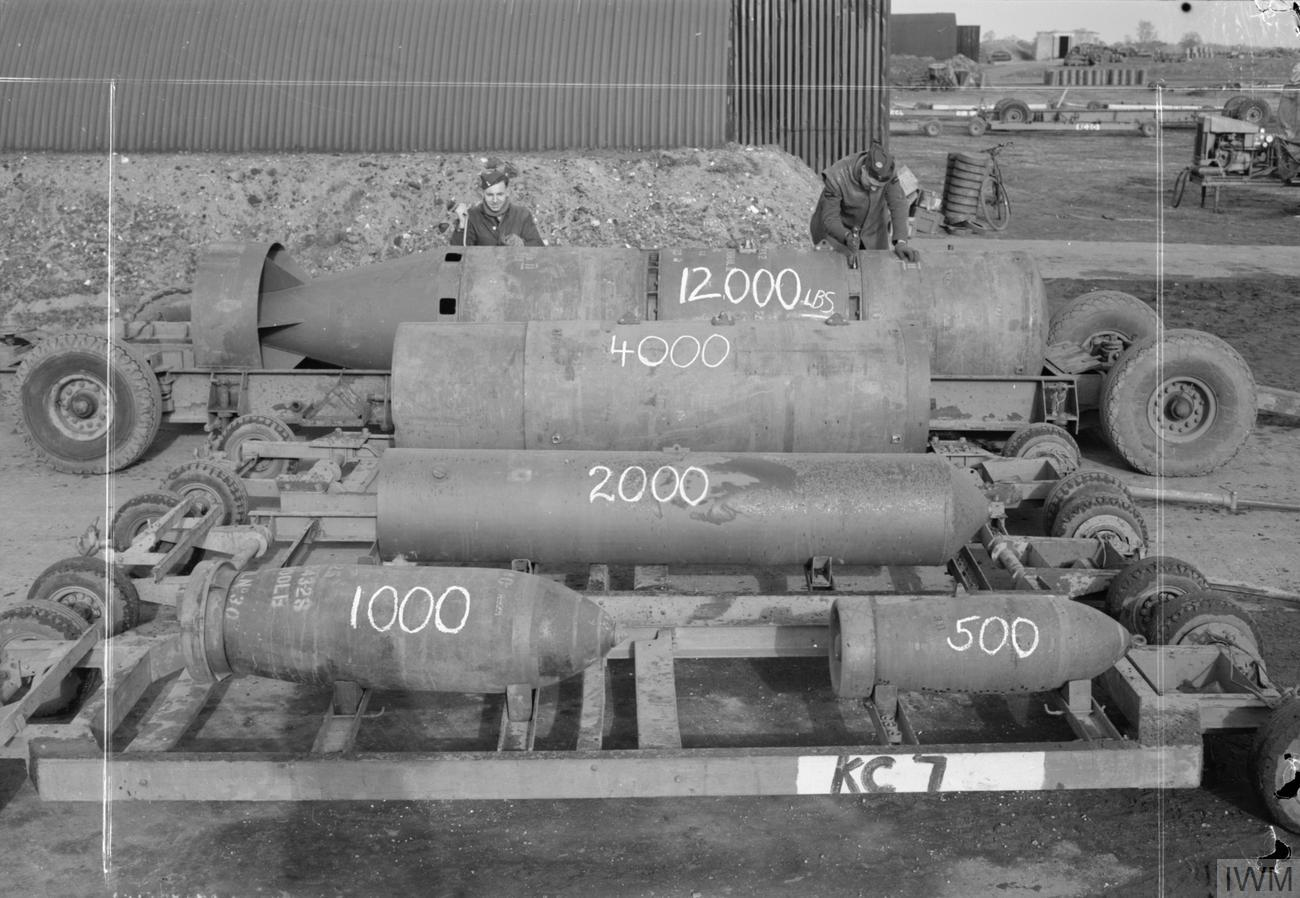
British HC bombs shown together for comparison with 1000 lb and 500 lb medium capacity bombs

=== 2,000 lb HC ===
Design of a 2,000 lb (910 kg) to meet requirements of similar size to existing 1,900 lb (860 kg) GP bomb was by Vickers with parachute arrangements by the RAF; this was at the same time Woolwich was designing the 4000 lb bomb. Actual case construction was by Great Western Railway Company. Live tests began at start of 1941; a few were used operationally in late 1941 with parachute dropping and delay timer. The parachute requirement was dropped and from early 1942 they were used with conventional tail. Improved Mark II and Mark III (with different fuse positions) followed in 1943. Actual weight was 1,723 lb (782 kg) for Mark II and III with 71% charge to weight filling of 60/40 or 50/50 Amatol, RDX/TNT 60/40, or Torpex 2.

=== 4,000 lb HC ===
- Mark I: first production design
- Mark II: three nose pistols
- Mark III: no side pistol pockets
- Mark IV: no stiffening beam
- Mark V: U.S. production
- Mark VI: U.S. production

Filling was Amatol, RDX/TNT, Minol, or Torpex. In 1943, 25,000 of these were used; this rose to 38,000 in 1944. In 1945 up to the end of the war a further 25,000 were used.

=== 8,000 lb HC ===
- Mk I
- Mk II

Actual weight 7,860 lb (3,570 kg) with charge to weight ratio of 68%. Filling was 'Amatex 9' or 'Torpex 2'. Bombs were produced from 1942 to 1945.

=== 12,000 lb HC ===
- Mk I
- Mk II

Charge weight ratio of 80%. Filling was Amatex or Torpex. 170 were produced in the last two years of the war.

== Other uses ==
=== Air mines ===
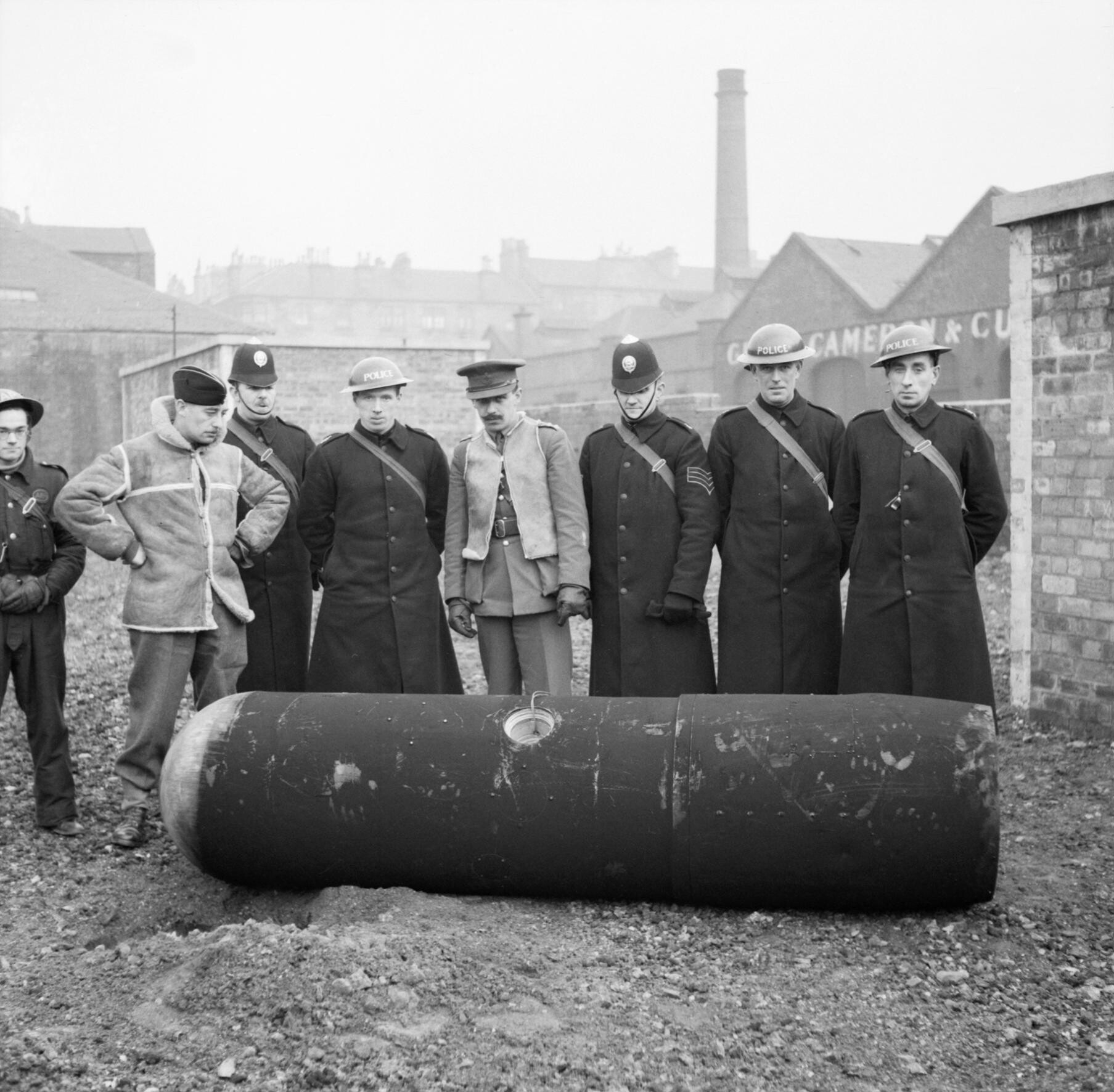
A defused German parachute mine in Glasgow, 18 March 1941

During The Blitz, the Germans used naval mines dropped with parachutes as improvised blockbusters. Their fuse was triggered by the shock of landing, with the bomb exploding after a 17-second delay. As the bomb was not in a crater, the force of the blast would disperse laterally, causing extensive damage. The large raid on Coventry on 14–15 November 1940 included the use of 50 parachute mines, which caused extensive blast damage. The British called these devices air-mines, a calque of the German term Luftmine. These types were used also during air raids on Malta, especially on its harbour areas.

== See also ==
- 12,000 lb (5.4 t) Tallboy bomb
- 22,000 lb (10.0 t) Grand Slam bomb
- Firebombing
- Firestorm
- Pumpkin bomb, test Fat Man atom bomb casings filled with 3.2 short tons (2.9 t) of Composition B explosive
- SC 1800 Satan, the rough German equivalent of the American AN-M56 general purpose blockbuster.
- BLU-82
- MOAB
