= H-6 =

H-6 may refer to:

- Composition H-6, high explosive substance, a variant of High Blast Explosive
- Hughes H-6, a light helicopter produced by Hughes Helicopters
- Hydrogen-6, an isotope of hydrogen
- Xi'an H-6, a chinese bomber aircraft
