= APM series directional fragmentation mines =

Series of Austrian antipersonnel land mines

The APM-1, APM-2, APM-3, APM 19, and APM 29 are Austrian directional fragmentation mines similar to the United States Claymore mine. The mine's cases are made from moulded plastic and have convex faces. They contain a matrix of 5 millimeter diameter steel balls weighing 0.5 gram laid over a Composition B charge. When triggered the mines project the fragments in a horizontal arc of approximately 60 degrees.

The mines were not produced in numerical order—the APM-3 was superseded by the APM-2. The APM-1 is the smallest of the mines; it uses a tripod mounting with a pan and tilt head. The APM-2 uses two scissor type legs to position.

The mines can be command or tripwire activated, and can be fitted with a time delay fuze ranging from one minute to twenty-four hours.

Production of the APM-1 and APM-2 ceased in 1980s, though both have been reported as used in Angola.

== Specifications ==
	APM-1	APM-2	APM-3	APM 19	APM 29
Weight	1 kg	2.95 kg	3 kg	1.9 kg	2.9 kg
Explosive content	0.36 kg of Composition B	1.3 kg of Composition B	1.2 kg of Composition B	0.9 kg of Composition B	1.45 kg of Composition B
Length	315 mm	140 mm		230 mm	265 mm
Height	80 mm	155 mm	140 mm	95 mm	120 mm
Width	40 mm	40 mm	23 mm	35 mm	45 mm
Fragments	290	1,450	1,000 +	923	923
Initial velocity	1,460 m/s	1,660 m/s			
Effective range	25 meters	50+ meters		50 m	50+ m
