= Amatol =

High explosive mixture

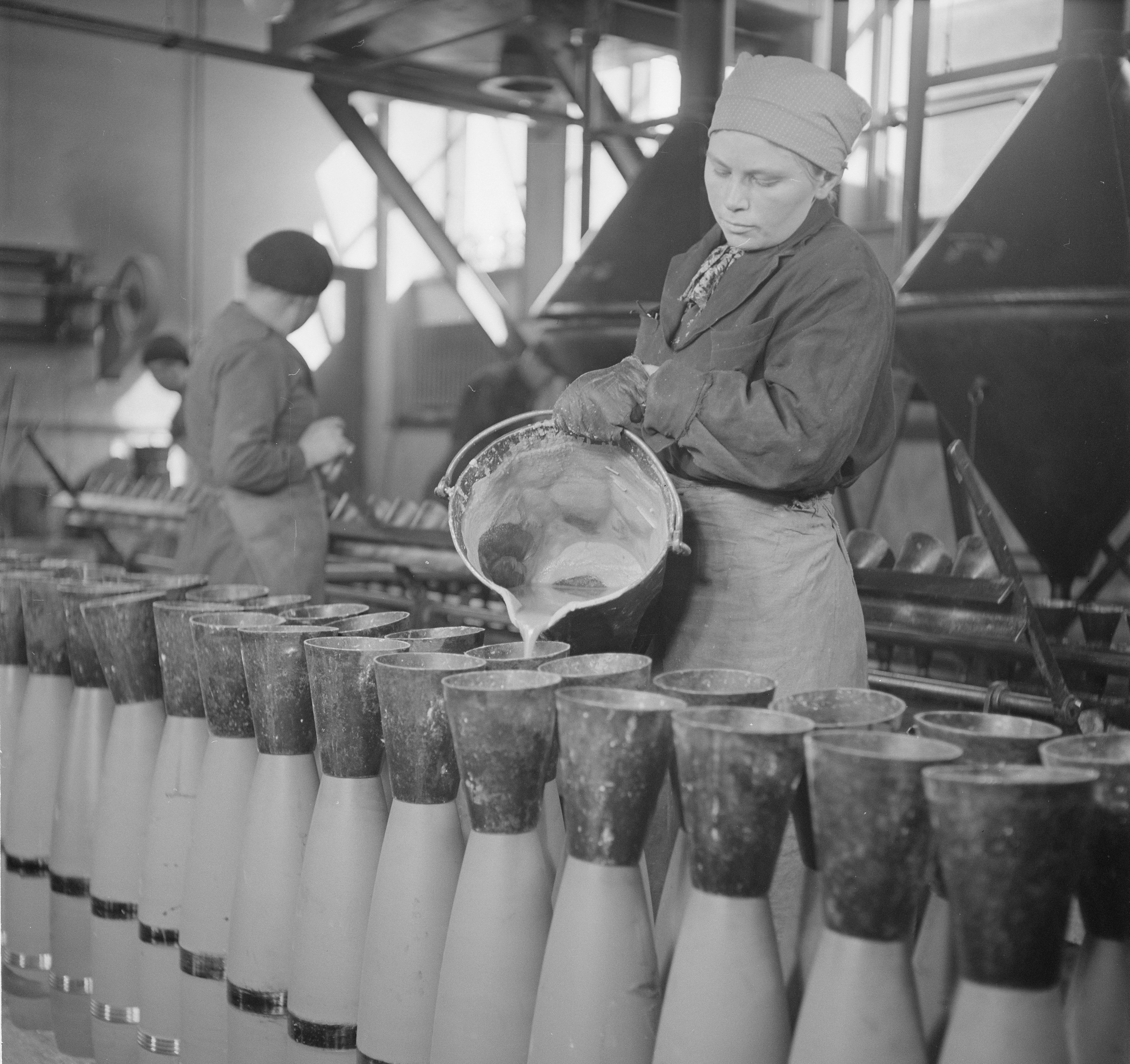
152 mm artillery shells being filled with liquid amatol. Finland, 1942

Amatol is a highly explosive material made from a mixture of TNT and ammonium nitrate. The British name originates from the words ammonium and toluene (the precursor of TNT). Similar mixtures (one part dinitronaphthalene and seven parts ammonium nitrate) were known as Schneiderite in France. Amatol was used extensively during World War I and World War II, typically as an explosive in military weapons such as aircraft bombs, shells, depth charges, and naval mines. It was eventually replaced with alternative explosives such as Composition B, Torpex, and Tritonal.

== Invention ==
Following the Shell Crisis of 1915 in which the UK did not have enough ordnance due to a lack of explosives, a team at the Royal Arsenal laboratories produced a mixture of ammonium nitrate and TNT, known as Amatol for short. Special factories were constructed for the manufacture of ammonium nitrate by the double decomposition of sodium nitrate and ammonium sulfate in solution followed by evaporative concentration and crystallization. It became the standard filling for shells and bombs, and was later adopted by the US as their principal high explosive.

== Manufacture and use ==
Amatol exploits synergy between TNT and ammonium nitrate. TNT has higher explosive velocity and brisance, but is deficient in oxygen. Oxygen deficiency causes black smoke residue from a pure TNT explosion. The oxygen surplus of ammonium nitrate increases the energy release of TNT during detonation. Depending on the ratio of ingredients used, amatol leaves a residue of white or grey smoke after detonation. Amatol has a lower explosive velocity and correspondingly lower brisance than TNT but is cheaper because of the lower cost of ammonium nitrate.

Amatol allowed supplies of TNT to be expanded considerably, with little reduction in the destructive power of the final product, so long as the amount of TNT in the mixture did not fall below 60%. For example, 6 tons of TNT mixed with 4 tons of ammonium nitrate would make 10 tons of high explosive, which had adequate performance for most military purposes. Mixtures containing as little as 20% TNT were for less demanding uses.

TNT is 50% deficient in oxygen. Amatol is oxygen balanced and is therefore more effective than pure TNT when exploding underground or underwater. Relatively unsophisticated cannery equipment can be adapted to amatol production. TNT is gently heated with steam or hot water until it melts, acquiring the physical characteristics of a syrup. Then the correct weight ratio of powdered ammonium nitrate is added and mixed in. Whilst this mixture is still in a molten state, it is poured into empty bomb casings and allowed to cool and solidify. The lowest grades of amatol could not be produced by casting molten TNT. Instead, flaked TNT was thoroughly mixed with powdered ammonium nitrate and then compressed or extruded.

Amatol ranges from off-white to slightly yellow or pinkish brown depending on the mixture used, and remains soft for long periods of storage. It is hygroscopic, which complicates long-term storage. To prevent moisture problems, amatol charges were coated with a thin layer of pure molten TNT or alternatively bitumen. Long-term storage was rare during wars because munitions charged with amatol were generally used soon after manufacture.

Amatol should not be stored in containers made from copper or brass, as it can form unstable compounds sensitive to vibration. Pressed, it is relatively insensitive but may be detonated by severe impact, whereas when cast, it is extremely insensitive. Primary explosives such as mercury fulminate were often used as a detonator, in combination with an explosive booster charge such as tetryl.

Amatol was widely used during World War II as filler for artillery shells since it blasted the lower-grade steel shell bodies used during the era into lethal fragments while more powerful explosives such as TNT or RDX would pulverize the shell into a fine powder. The explosive charges hidden in HMS Campbeltown during the St. Nazaire Raid of 1942 contained amatol. The British X class midget submarines which planted explosive charges beneath the German battleship Tirpitz in September 1943 carried two "saddle charges" containing four tons of amatol. Warheads for the German V-1 flying bomb and V-2 rockets also contained amatol.

Modern shells use higher-grades of steel, allowing the use of more powerful explosives with thinner walls to increase the explosive filler capacity. Filling them with amatol would give poor fragmentation.

A derivative of amatol is amatex, consisting of 51% ammonium nitrate, 40% TNT, and 9% RDX (which also has a negative oxygen balance).

== Ammonite ==
Amatol is rare today, except in legacy munitions or unexploded ordnance. Ammonite, a form of amatol, is a civil engineering explosive popular in Eastern Europe and China. Generally comprising a 20/80 mixture of TNT and ammonium nitrate it is typically used for quarrying or mining.

Because the proportion of TNT is significantly lower than in its military counterpart, ammonite has much less destructive power. In general, a 30 kilogram charge of ammonite is roughly equivalent to 20 kilograms of TNT.

== Amatol, New Jersey ==
Amatol was the name given to a munitions factory and planned community built by the United States government in Mullica Township, New Jersey during World War I. After the war, the town was dismantled. The Atlantic City Speedway was built on part of the Amatol site in 1926. The site (including the speedway) is presently (as of 2020) abandoned.

== See also ==
- Ammonal
- Minol
- Hexanite
- RE factor
