= Amatex =

Amatex is a military explosive consisting of 51% ammonium nitrate, 40% TNT, and 9% RDX.
