= Composition C =

Family of related US-specified plastic explosives consisting primarily of RDX

The Composition C family is a family of related US-specified plastic explosives consisting primarily of RDX. All can be moulded by hand for use in demolition work and packed by hand into shaped-charge devices. Variants have different proportions and plasticisers and include: Composition C-1, Composition C-2, Composition C-3, and Composition C-4.

== History ==
The term Composition is used for any explosive material compounded from several ingredients. In particular, in the 1940s the format "Composition <letter>" was used for various compositions of the (relatively) novel explosive RDX, such as Composition B and other variants.

== Development ==
The original material was developed by the British during World War II, and was used in the Gammon bomb. It was standardised as Composition C when introduced to US service. This material consisted of 88.3% RDX and a mineral oil-based plasticiser and phlegmatiser. It suffered from a relatively limited range of serviceable temperatures, and was replaced by Composition C-2 around 1943, which would later be redeveloped around 1944 as Composition C-3. Research on a replacement for C-3 was begun prior to 1950, but the new generation of Composition C (C-4) did not begin pilot production until 1956.

=== Composition ===
Composition C-1 contained a slightly smaller proportion of RDX, but used an explosive plasticiser, which contained tetryl, nitrocellulose and a mixture of nitroaromatics produced during the manufacture of TNT (containing trinitrotoluene, dinitrotoluene, and mononitrotoluene), and a trace of solvent.

== Characteristics and usage ==
Composition C-3 was very similar to Composition C-1, but removed the solvent and varied the exact proportions of plasticisers to improve high temperature storage. It is a yellow, putty-like material. It remained a service item through the Korean War, but had marginal plasticity at the very low temperatures encountered in Korean winters, and was significantly toxic, including by vapour and skin absorption. While Composition C-3 had a much wider serviceable temperature range than Composition C-1, it could not be stored at elevated temperatures. Consequently, it would eventually be replaced by Composition C-4. The velocity of detonation is about 7600 m/s (25,000 feet per second).

Composition C-3 consists of 77%–85% cyclonite (RDX) and 15%–23% gel made out of liquid nitro compounds (e.g. liquid DNT and small amount of NT) and nitrocellulose or butyl phthalate and nitrocellulose.

One of the first reported and tested compositions of C-3 was very similar to earlier Composition C-2 and contained 77% RDX, 3% tetryl, 4% TNT, 1% NC, 5% NT, and 10% DNT. The last two compounds (they are very poor explosives) are oily liquids and plasticise the mixture. The most important later innovation of C-3 introduced the non-explosive plasticiser butyl phthalate instead of this mixture of nitro compounds. This reduced the toxicity while increasing the concentration of RDX and improving safety of use and storage. It also opened the way to begin study of new non-explosive low-toxicity plasticisers (esters of dicarboxylic acid) and binder (branched polymers).

== Properties ==
Since 1960 the mixture of C-4 has contained:

- 90.0–91.0% of cyclonite (RDX explosives)
- ~2.1% of polyisobutylene (short chain)
- ~1.6% of motor oil
- ~5.3% of di-(2-ethylhexyl)sebacate (dioctyl sebacate), sometimes it was replaced partly by similar compounds such as dioctyl adipate
- less than 0.6% of water
- (small amount of marker or odorising taggant)

It is less volatile than C-3 and has less tendency to harden at low temperature. It has a density 1.48–1.60 g/ml, does not become hard even at −55 °C (−67 °F), and does not exude at +77 °C (171 °F). C-4 has a detonation velocity of 8092 m/s (26550 ft/s) at high density and velocity of 7550 m/s (24770 ft/s) at low density 1.48 g/ml. It is so successful that it remains in army service up to the current time without any significant changes.

== See also ==
- Composition C4
- Composition B
- Composition H6
- Plasticizer § Energetic materials
- Polymer-bonded explosive
- RE factor
- Semtex
