= Minol (explosive) =

Military explosive

Minol (pronounced mine-ol) is a military explosive developed by the Admiralty early in the Second World War to augment supplies of trinitrotoluene (TNT) and RDX, which were in short supply.

Minol was historically used on underwater munitions (naval mines, torpedoes, depth charges), blockbuster bombs, and general-purpose bombs.

== Background ==
Prior to World War II, the United States used TNT as filler for bombs, but with the transfer of 8,000 metric tons to the British under Lend-Lease in 1940 against a production surplus of approximately 9,000 tons, the US had to use alternatives including RDX and Composition B. With factories split between producing RDX, high-octane gasoline, and synthetic rubber, both the British and the US independently began testing aluminized fillings as a substitute for TNT, with the British developing Minol and the US Tritonal.

According to British testings, Minol-2 produced a demolition area 30% larger than a TNT filler, while the US Army Ordnance technicians concluded that the aluminium component contributed to its blast effect.

== Composition ==
Initially, three Minol formulas were used. All percentages shown are by weight:

- Minol-1: 48% TNT, 42% ammonium nitrate (AN) and 10% powdered aluminium
- Minol-2: 40% TNT, 40% ammonium nitrate and 20% powdered aluminium
- Minol-3: 42% TNT, 38% ammonium nitrate and 20% powdered aluminium

These three Minols suffered from expansion, spewing and gassing due to the reaction of fine aluminium powder with moisture and structural phase transitions in ammonium nitrate. To improve stability of Minol and increase production, more coarse aluminium powder was introduced. Later it was found that aluminium chips, such as filings, flakes and shavings, also gave good performance and improved stability.

Compared to TNT and Tritonal, Minol is more sensitive to shock and less brisant.

To solve the problem with dimensional instability, pure ammonium nitrate was replaced by a solid solution of 10% of potassium nitrate in ammonium nitrate. Thus, a new formula was adopted:

- Minol-4: 40% TNT, 36% ammonium nitrate, 4% potassium nitrate and 20% powdered aluminium

The addition of potassium nitrate minimized expansion of Minol, making it more stable to temperature changes than TNT, but didn't solve the expansion problem. Minol IV could still expand and develop cracks after prolonged thermal cycling. A new composition, with 20% of potassium nitrate in solid solution, was developed. It didn't expand or crack even when cycled for months, but wasn't adopted for production and service.

== Use ==
Minol-2 was historically used as filler for underwater munitions (naval mines, torpedoes, depth charges), blockbuster bombs, concrete fragmentation bombs (the blast did not pulverize the concrete casing while splitting it into high-velocity fragments), and general-purpose bombs.

Since the 1950s, Minol has been superseded by more modern PBX compositions, due to their superior explosive yield and stability when being stored; Minol is regarded as obsolete. Generally, any Minol-filled munitions encountered will be in the form of legacy munitions or unexploded ordnance dating from before the 1960s.

== See also ==
- Amatol
- Composition H6
- Hexanite
- Torpex
- Tritonal
