= Tritonal =

High explosive mixture

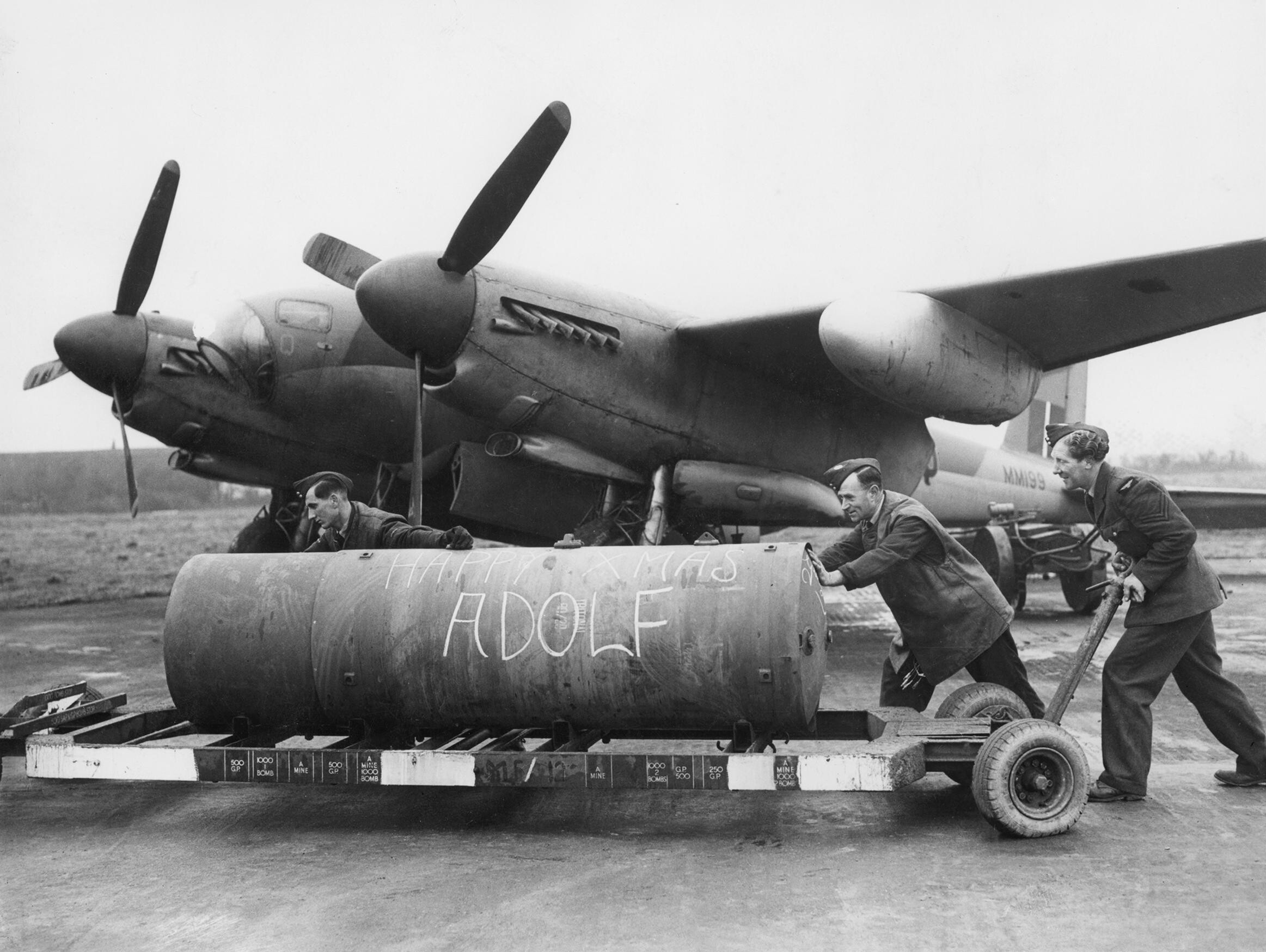
A 4,000 lb (1,800 kg) blockbuster bomb being loaded onto a De Havilland Mosquito of the RAF, circa 1944. The explosive filling of tritonal 80/20 is stencilled on the side, inside the chalked "O" of "Adolf"

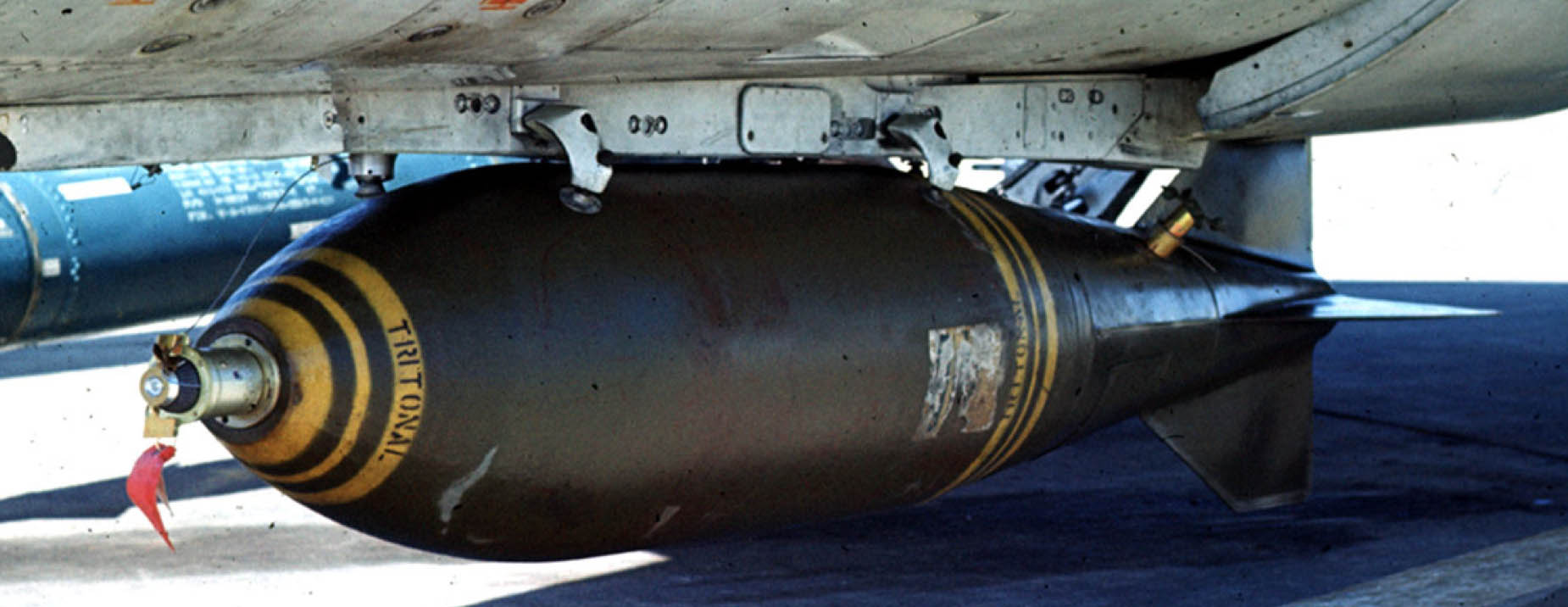
A 750 lb (340 kg) M117 bomb. The explosive filling of tritonal is stencilled on the nose

Tritonal is a mixture of 80% TNT and 20% aluminium powder, used in several types of ordnance such as air-dropped bombs. The aluminium increases the total heat output and hence impulse of the TNT – the length of time during which the blast wave is positive. Tritonal is approximately 18% more powerful than TNT alone.

The 87 kg of tritonal in a Mark 82 bomb has the potential to produce approximately 863 MJ of energy when detonated. This implies a specific energy of approximately 9 MJ/kg, compared to ~4 MJ/kg for TNT.

== History ==
TNT was first prepared by Julius Wilbrand in 1863. Germany began manufacturing TNT in 1891 and aluminium was first mixed with TNT in 1899 to produce an explosive compound. In 1902, the German Army began to use TNT, replacing picric acid, and in 1912, the US Army also started to use TNT. TNT production was limited by the availability of toluene which came from coal tar. Therefore, mixtures of TNT with other compounds became widespread to relieve the shortage of TNT.

Modern tritonal was developed as a cheaper substitute for Torpex and HBX under UWE designation (UnderWater Explosive) before it turned out Allies could produce enough RDX to cover all naval requirements late in WWII.

== See also ==
- Torpex
- Composition H6
- Minol
- Relative effectiveness factor (RE)
