= Torpex =

High explosive

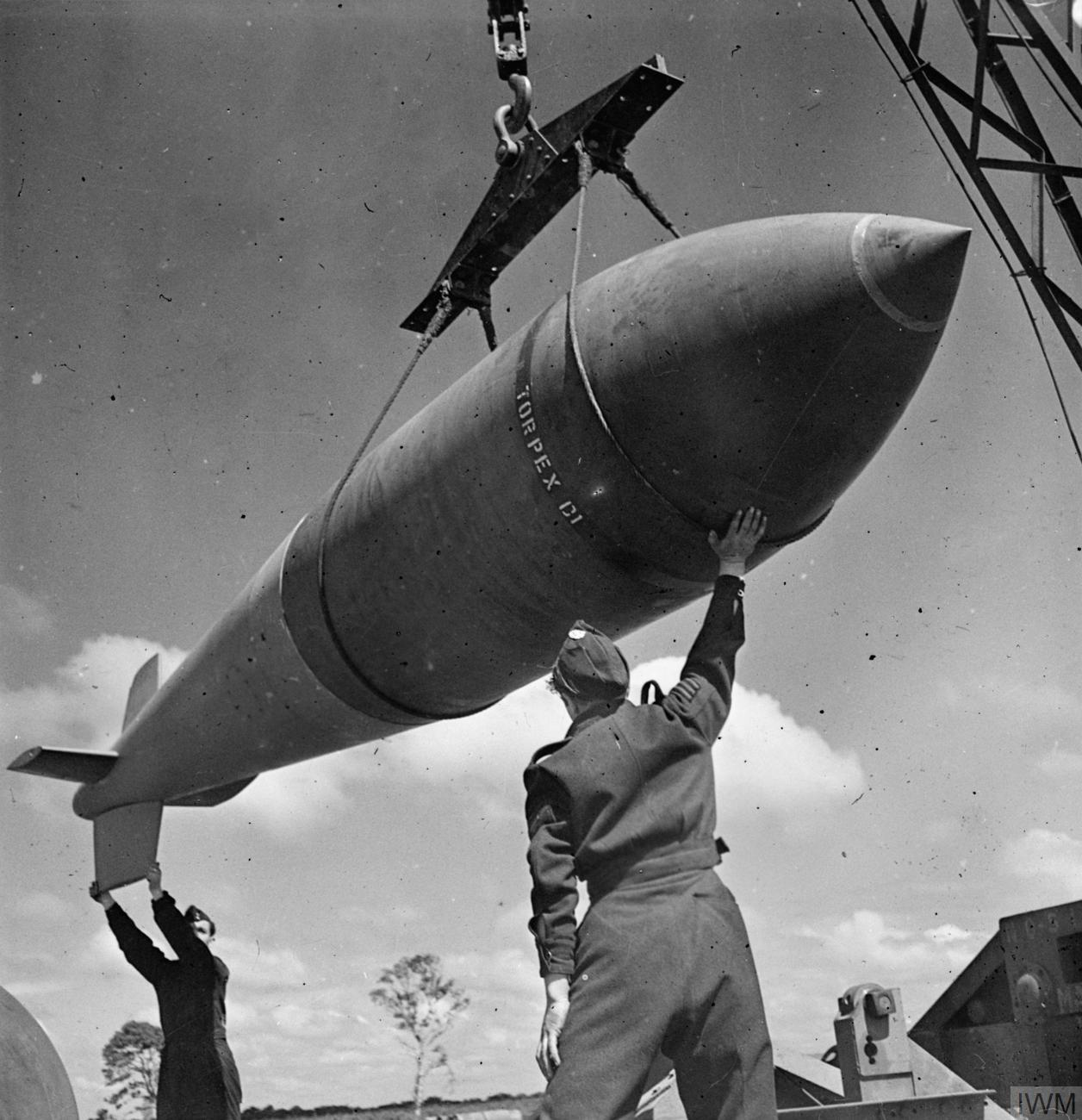
Tallboy bomb stencilled with its explosive filling

Torpex ("Torpedo explosive") is a secondary explosive, 50% more powerful than TNT by mass. Torpex comprises 42% RDX, 40% TNT and 18% powdered aluminium. It was used in the Second World War from late 1942, at which time some used the names Torpex and RDX interchangeably. Torpex proved to be particularly useful in underwater munitions because the aluminium component made the explosive pulse last longer, which increased the destructive power. Besides torpedoes, naval mines, and depth charges, Torpex was also used in the MC 500lb and 1000lb bombs, the 4000lb, 8000lb, and 12000lb "cookie" HC bombs and in the Upkeep, Tallboy and Grand Slam bombs as well as the drones employed in Operation Aphrodite. Torpex has long been superseded by H6 and Polymer-bonded explosive (PBX) compositions. It is regarded as obsolete and Torpex is unlikely to be encountered except in old munitions or unexploded ordnance, although a notable exception to this is the Sting Ray lightweight torpedo, which as of October 2020 remains in service with the Royal Navy and several foreign militaries. The German equivalent of Torpex was Trialen.

== Development ==
Torpex was developed at the Royal Gunpowder Factory, Waltham Abbey, in the United Kingdom as a more powerful military alternative to TNT. RDX was developed in 1899. Though very stable and serving as the reference point by which the sensitivity of other explosives are judged, it was too expensive for most military applications and reserved for use in the most important products, such as torpedoes. Aluminium powder was also added to the mix to further enhance the effect. Although both RDX and TNT have a negative oxygen balance, the superheated aluminium component tends to contribute primarily by extending the expansion time of the explosive product gases. Beeswax was also added as a phlegmatizing agent, to reduce sensitivity to shock and impact. Later, beeswax was replaced with paraffin wax, and calcium chloride was added as a moisture absorber to reduce the production of hydrogen gas under high humidity.

The production of RDX in the USA skyrocketed following the attack on Pearl Harbor by the Japanese. In April 1942, 100 tons of Composition C (88% RDX and oil desensitizer), also known as C4, was ordered by the Office of Strategic Services. By 8 May 1945 (Victory in Europe Day) the Holston Ordnance Works had been in full production of RDX with no end in sight. In July of that year government officials informed the plant to not exceed production quotas (as had been the practice to that point) since they knew that the atomic bomb was near completion.

== See also ==
- Amatol
- Hexanite
- List of explosives used during World War II
- Minol (explosive)
- Tritonal

== Sources ==
- Gannon, Robert (1996). Hellions of the Deep: The Development of American Torpedoes in World War II. University Park, PA: Pennsylvania State University Press. ISBN 0-271-01508-X. OCLC 32349009.
- Baxter, Colin F. (2018). The Secret History of RDX. The University Press of Kentucky. doi:10.2307/j.ctt2111h03.
