= Composition H-6 =

Mix of high explosives

Composition H-6 is a melt-cast military aluminized high explosive. H-6 was developed in the United States.

The chemical composition of H-6 is specified as follows:

- 45.1 ± 0.3% RDX;
- 29.2 ± 3.0% TNT;
- 21.0 ± 3.0% powdered aluminium;
- 4.7 ± 1.0% paraffin wax as a phlegmatizing agent;
- 0.47 ± 0.1% calcium chloride as a desiccant to prevent moisture from reacting with the powdered aluminium.

Comp H-6 is used in a number of military applications, specifically as an explosive main fill, in munitions including aerial bombs such as the general purpose Mark 80 bombs in use with the USMC and US Navy (while USAF Mark 80s use a tritonal main fill); and underwater munitions (e.g. naval mines, depth charges and torpedoes) where it has generally replaced torpex, being less shock-sensitive and having more stable storage characteristics. It is approximately 1.35 times more powerful than pure TNT.

== Properties ==
- Density: 1.73—1.74 g/cm^{3}
- Velocity of detonation: 7,367 m/s

== Manufacture ==
Australia is one of the largest manufacturers of Composition H-6, originally being made at St Marys Munitions Filling Factory MFF New South Wales, for the main fill of Mark 82 and 84 general purpose bombs. Manufacturing has since moved to the Mulwala Propellant Facility, NSW.

== See also ==
- Torpex
- Tritonal
- Minol
- Amatol
- Composition C
