= Composition B =

Explosive, a mix of RDX and TNT

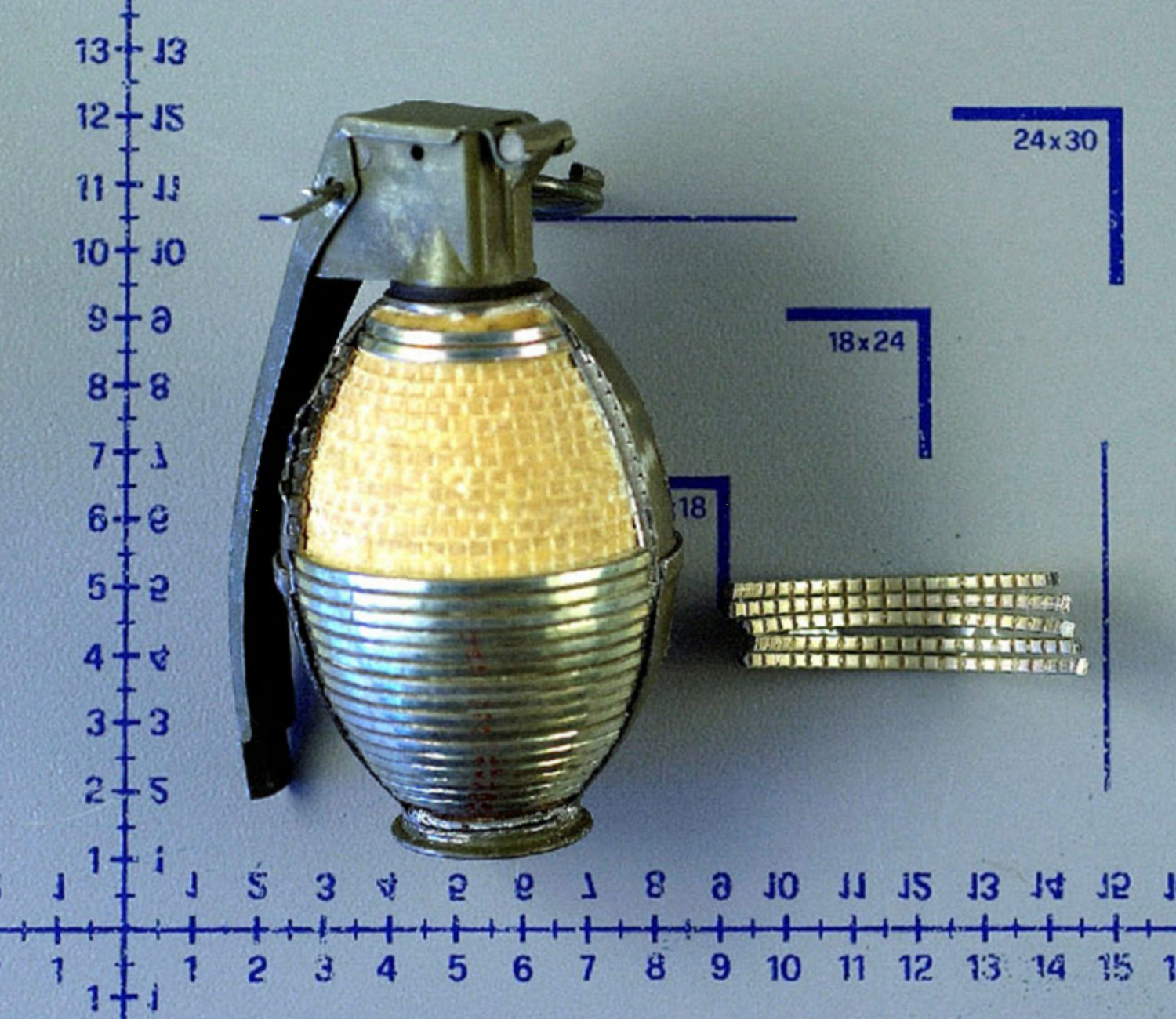
This post-World War II German DM41 fragmentation hand grenade has been dissected to reveal the steel fragmentation sleeve and yellow Composition B explosive charge.

Composition B (Comp B), also known as Hexotol and Hexolite (among others), is a high explosive consisting of castable mixtures of RDX and TNT. It is used as the main explosive filling in artillery projectiles, rockets, land mines, hand grenades, and various other munitions. It was also used for the explosive lenses in the first implosion-type nuclear weapons developed by the United Kingdom and United States.

The standard proportions of ingredients (by weight) are 59.5% RDX (detonation velocity of 8,750 m/s) and 39.5% TNT (detonation velocity of 6,900 m/s), phlegmatized with 1% paraffin wax. Most commonly it is described as 60/40 RDX/TNT with 1% wax added.

== Properties ==
- Density: 1.65 g/cm^{3}
- Velocity of detonation: 8,050 m/s

== Use ==
Composition B was extremely common in Western nations' munitions and was the standard explosive filler from early World War II until the early 1950s, when less sensitive explosives such as Composition H6 began to replace it in many weapons. M65 bombs from 1953 containing degraded Composition B were responsible for much of the damage in the 1967 USS Forrestal fire.

Some NATO-approved munitions suppliers such as Mecar have continued to use Composition B in their products.

Composition B is related to Cyclotol, which has a higher proportion of RDX (up to 75%).

IMX-101 is slowly replacing Comp B in US military artillery shells, and IMX-104 in mortar rounds and hand grenades.

== Gallery ==
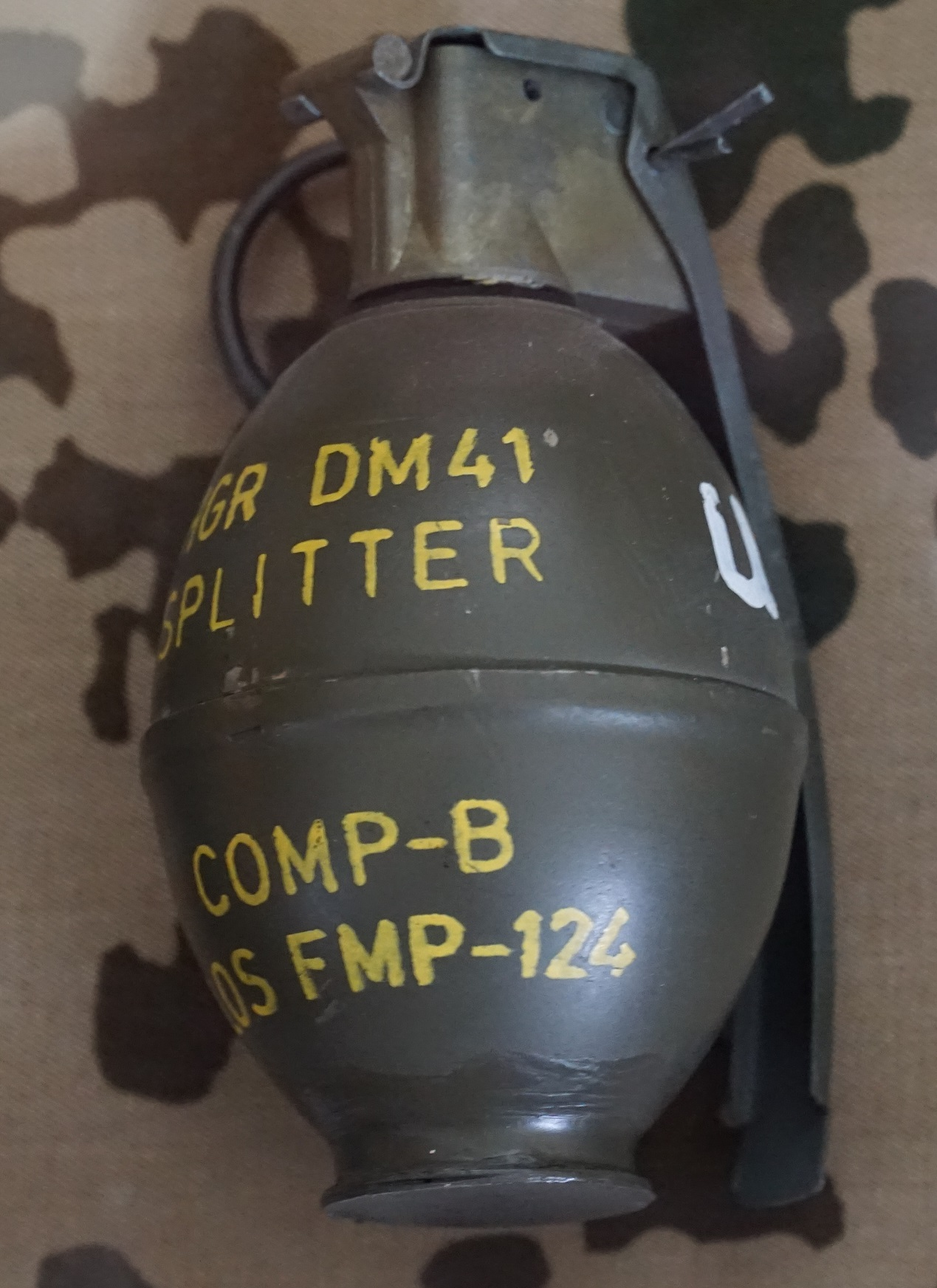
German DM41 fragmentation hand grenade labelled to indicate a filling of Composition B.

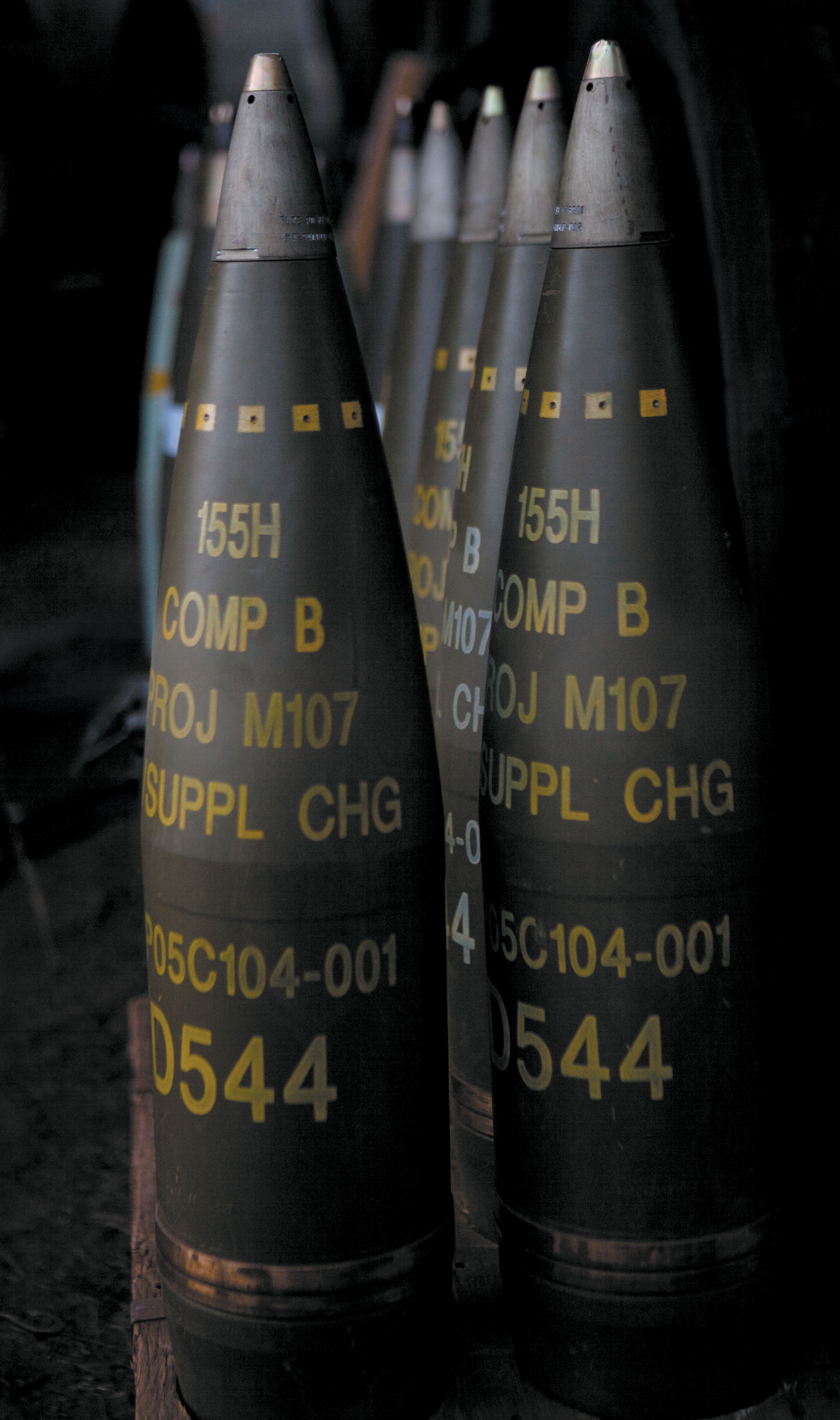
M107 projectiles. All are labelled to indicate a filling of "Comp B" and have fuzes fitted.

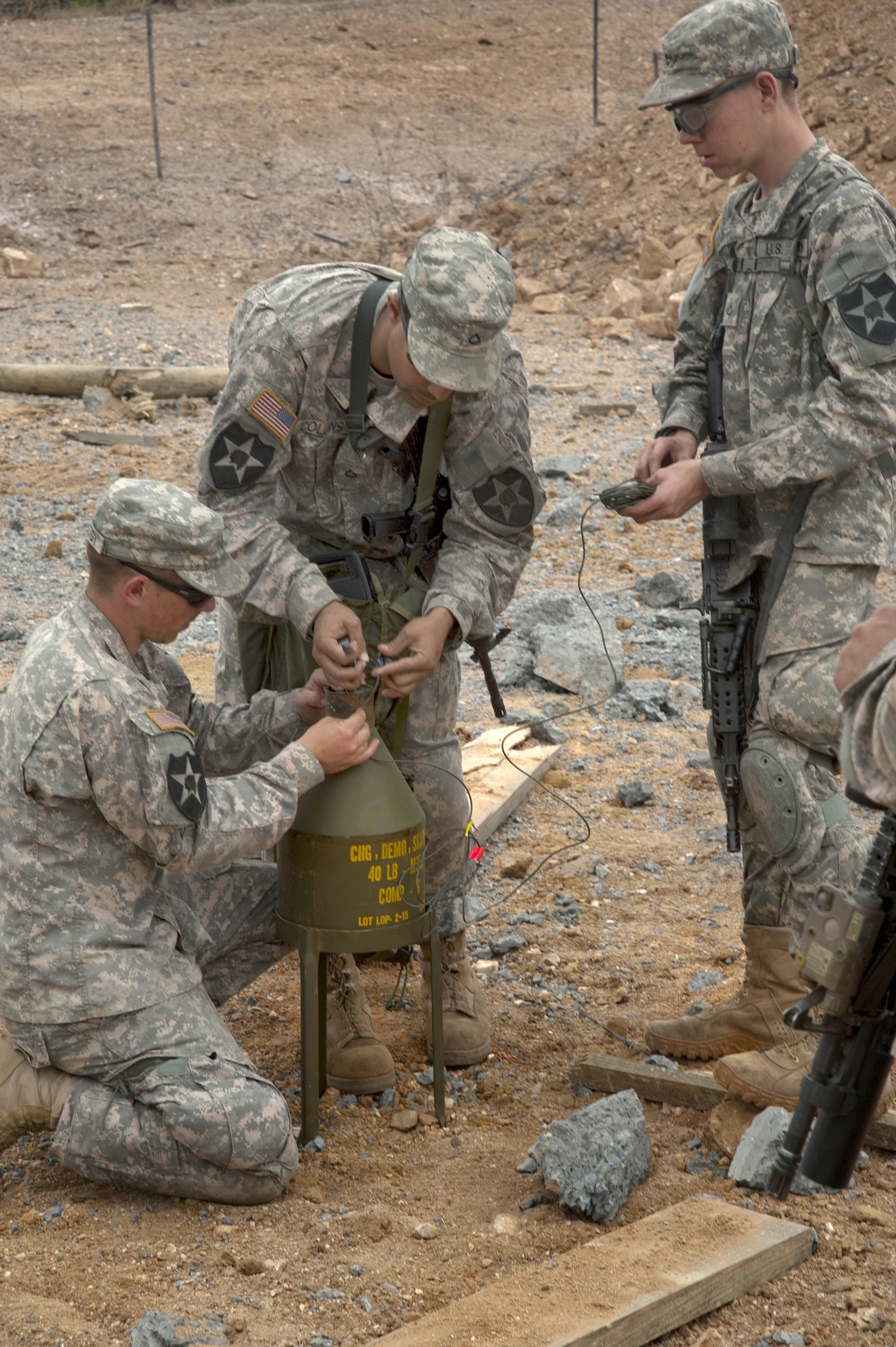
A 40 lb (18 kg) shaped charge munition (marked to indicate a Composition B filling) used for various demolition purposes such as boring a hole for a cratering charge.

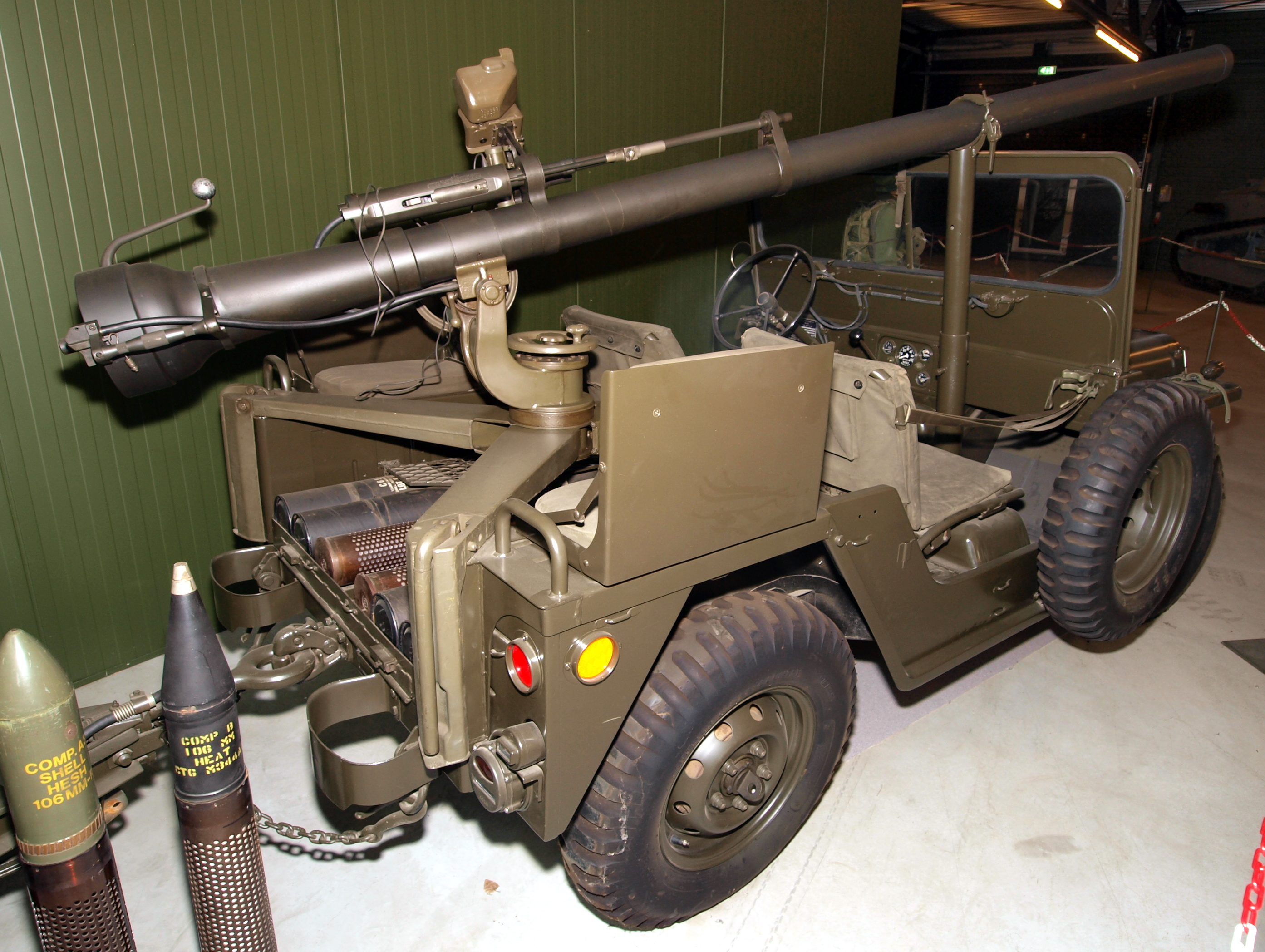
The 106mm recoilless rifle HEAT shell on the right is marked "Comp B".

== See also ==
- Composition C
- Cyclotol
- RE factor
- Semtex
