= Bomb =

Explosive weapon that uses exothermic reaction

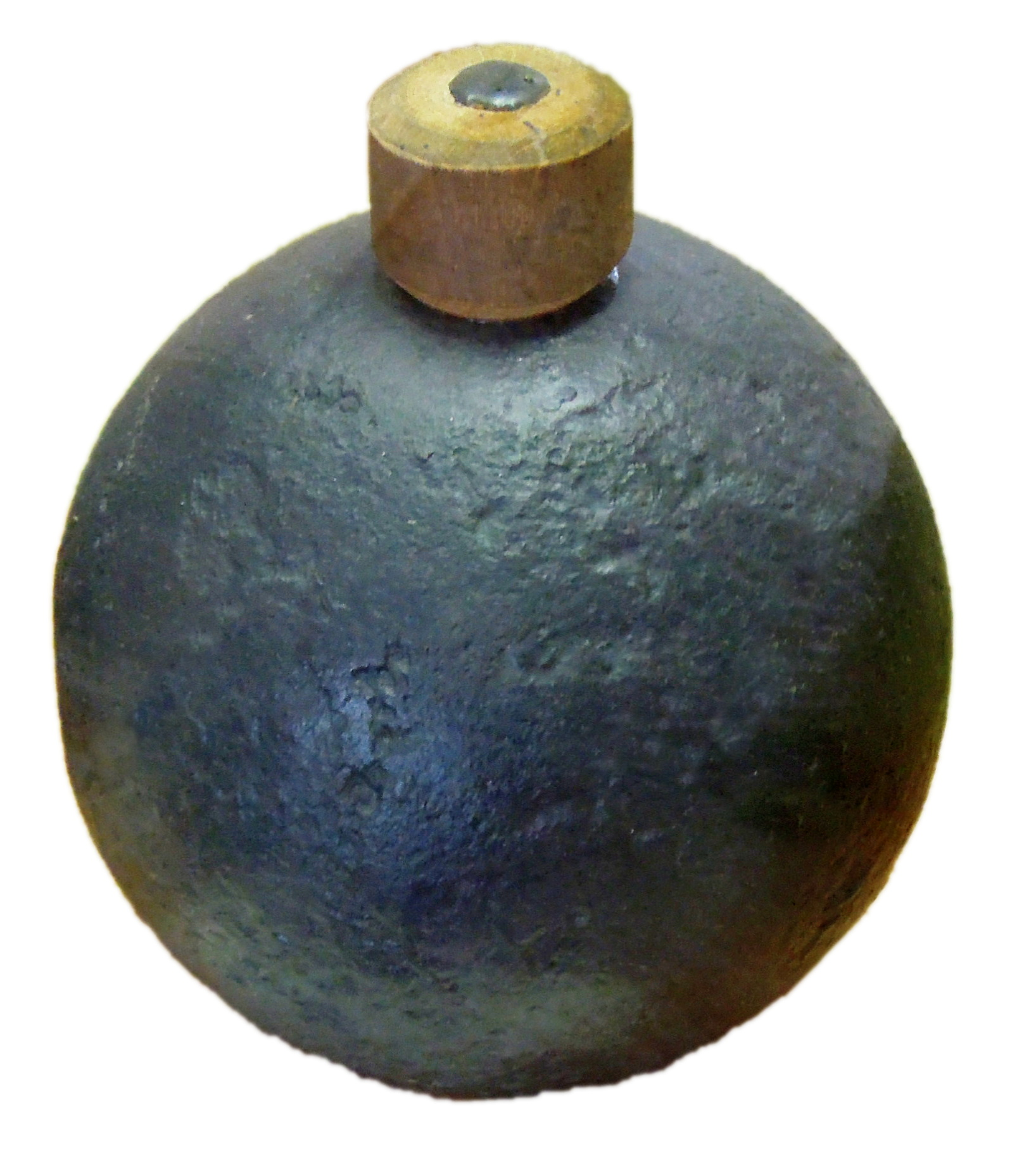
An iron grenade with a wooden fuse from 1580

A bomb is an explosive weapon that uses the exothermic reaction of an explosive material to provide an extremely sudden and violent release of energy. Detonations inflict damage principally through ground- and atmosphere-transmitted mechanical stress, the impact and penetration of pressure-driven projectiles, pressure damage, and explosion-generated effects. Bombs have been utilized since the 11th century starting in East Asia.

The term bomb is not usually applied to explosive devices used for civilian purposes such as construction or mining, although the people using the devices may sometimes refer to them as a "bomb". The military use of the term "bomb", or more specifically aerial bomb action, typically refers to airdropped, unpowered explosive weapons most commonly used by air forces and naval aviation. Other military explosive weapons not classified as "bombs" include shells, depth charges (used in water), or land mines. In unconventional warfare, other names can refer to a range of offensive weaponry. For instance, in recent asymmetric conflicts, homemade bombs called "improvised explosive devices" (IEDs) have been employed by irregular forces to great effectiveness.

The word comes from the Latin bombus, which in turn comes from the Greek βόμβος romanized bombos, an onomatopoetic term meaning 'booming', 'buzzing'.

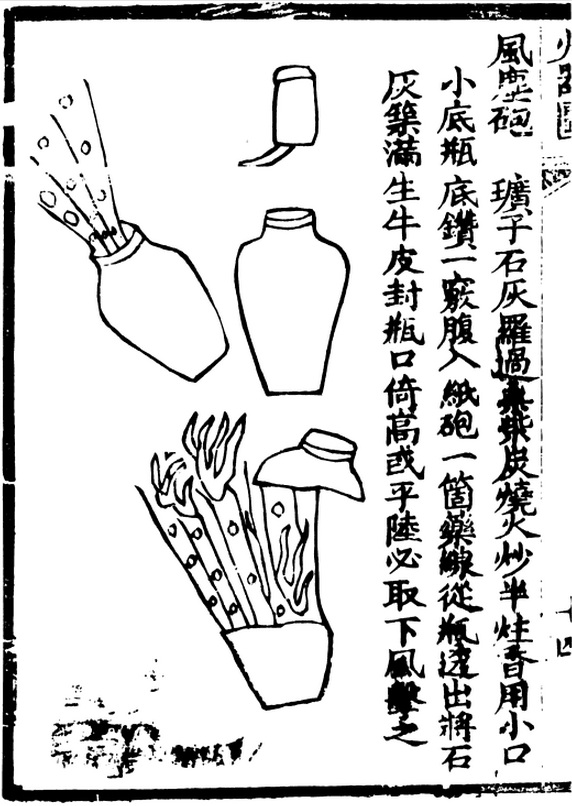
A "wind-and-dust" bomb depicted in the Ming Dynasty book Huolongjing. The pot contains a tube of gunpowder, and was thrown at invaders.

== History ==
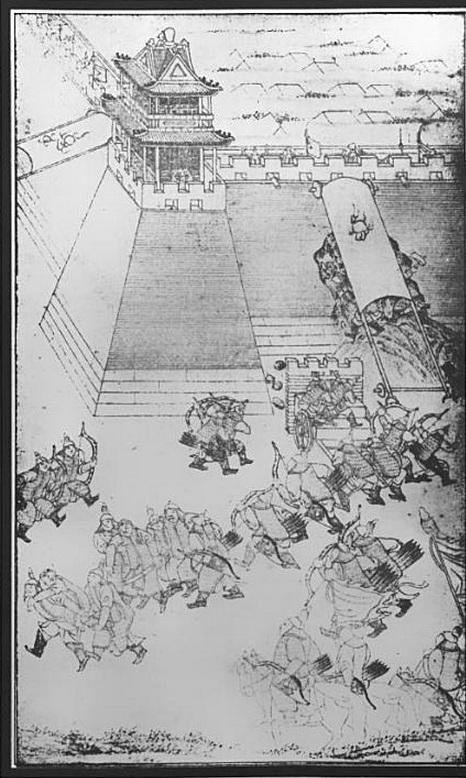
An illustration depicting bombs thrown at Manchu assault ladders during the siege of Ningyuan, from the book Thai Tsu Shih Lu Thu (Veritable Records of the Great Ancestor) written in 1635. The bombs are known as "thunder crash bombs."

Gunpowder bombs had been mentioned since the 11th century. In 1000 AD, a soldier by the name of Tang Fu (唐福) demonstrated a design of gunpowder pots (a proto-bomb which spews fire) and gunpowder caltrops, for which he was richly rewarded. In the same year, Xu Dong wrote that trebuchets used bombs that were like "flying fire", suggesting that they were incendiaries. In the military text Wujing Zongyao of 1044, bombs such as the "ten-thousand fire flying sand magic bomb", "burning heaven fierce fire unstoppable bomb", and "thunderclap bomb" (pilipao) were mentioned. However these were soft-shell bombs and did not use metal casings.

Bombs made of cast iron shells packed with explosive gunpowder date to 13th century China. Explosive bombs were used in East Asia in 1221, by a Jurchen Jin army against a Chinese Song city. The term for this explosive bomb seems to have been coined the "thunder crash bomb" during a Jin dynasty (1115–1234) naval battle in 1231 against the Mongols.

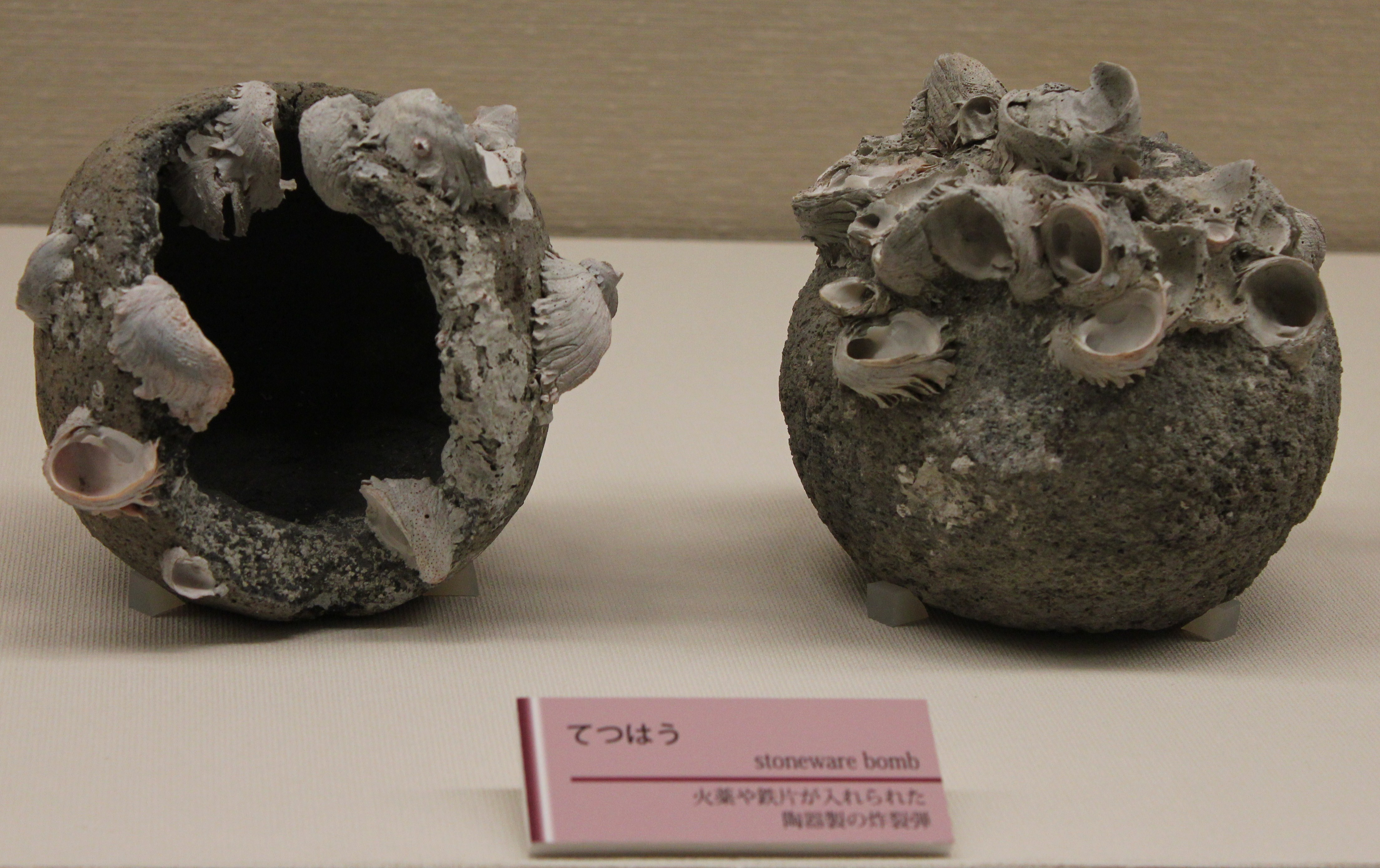
Thunder crash bombs from the Mongol invasions of Japan (13th century) that were excavated from a shipwreck near the Liancourt Rocks

The History of Jin (金史) (compiled by 1345) states that in 1232, as the Mongol general Subutai (1176–1248) descended on the Jin stronghold of Kaifeng, the defenders had a "thunder crash bomb" which "consisted of gunpowder put into an iron container ... then when the fuse was lit (and the projectile shot off) there was a great explosion the noise whereof was like thunder, audible for more than thirty miles, and the vegetation was scorched and blasted by the heat over an area of more than half a mou. When hit, even iron armour was quite pierced through."

The Song Dynasty (960–1279) official Li Zengbo wrote in 1257 that arsenals should have several hundred thousand iron bomb shells available and that when he was in Jingzhou, about one to two thousand were produced each month for dispatch of ten to twenty thousand at a time to Xiangyang and Yingzhou. The Ming Dynasty text Huolongjing describes the use of poisonous gunpowder bombs, including the "wind-and-dust" bomb.

During the Mongol invasions of Japan, the Mongols used the explosive "thunder-crash bombs" against the Japanese. Archaeological evidence of the "thunder-crash bombs" has been discovered in an underwater shipwreck off the shore of Japan by the Kyushu Okinawa Society for Underwater Archaeology. X-rays by Japanese scientists of the excavated shells confirmed that they contained gunpowder.

== Shock ==
Explosive shock waves can cause situations such as body displacement (i.e., people being thrown through the air), dismemberment, internal bleeding and ruptured eardrums.

Shock waves produced by explosive events have two distinct components, the positive and negative wave. The positive wave shoves outward from the point of detonation, followed by the trailing vacuum space "sucking back" towards the point of origin as the shock bubble collapses. The greatest defense against shock injuries is distance from the source of shock. As a point of reference, the overpressure at the Oklahoma City bombing was estimated in the range of 28 MPa.

== Heat ==
A thermal wave is created by the sudden release of heat caused by an explosion. Military bomb tests have documented temperatures of up to 2,480 °C (4,500 °F). While capable of inflicting severe to catastrophic burns and causing secondary fires, thermal wave effects are considered very limited in range compared to shock and fragmentation. This rule has been challenged, however, by military development of thermobaric weapons, which employ a combination of negative shock wave effects and extreme temperature to incinerate objects within the blast radius.

== Fragmentation ==
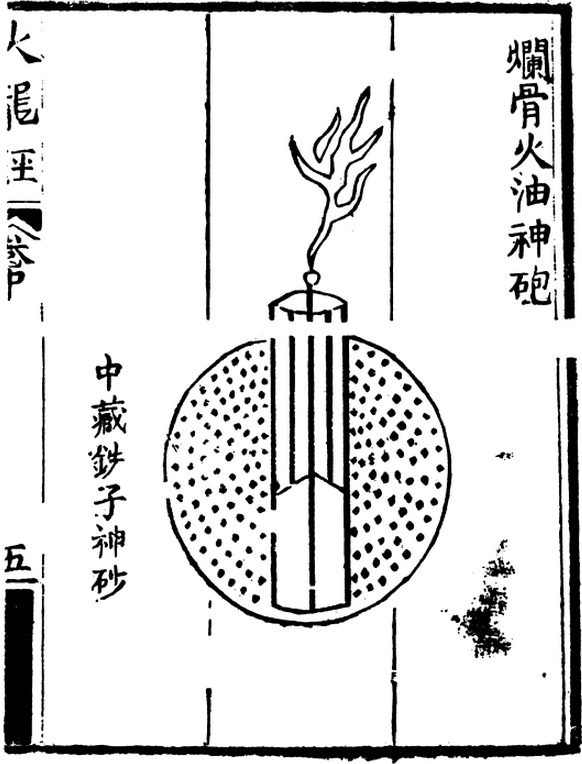
An illustration of a fragmentation bomb from the 14th century Ming Dynasty text Huolongjing. The black dots represent iron pellets.

Fragmentation is produced by the acceleration of shattered pieces of bomb casing and adjacent physical objects. The use of fragmentation in bombs dates to the 14th century, and appears in the Ming Dynasty text Huolongjing. The fragmentation bombs were filled with iron pellets and pieces of broken porcelain. Once the bomb explodes, the resulting fragments are capable of piercing the skin and blinding enemy soldiers.

While conventionally viewed as small metal shards moving at super-supersonic and hypersonic speeds, fragmentation can occur in epic proportions and travel for extensive distances. When the SS Grandcamp exploded in the Texas City Disaster on April 16, 1947, one fragment of that blast was a two-ton anchor which was hurled nearly two miles inland to embed itself in the parking lot of the Pan American refinery.

== Effects on living things ==
To people who are close to a blast incident, such as bomb disposal technicians, soldiers wearing body armor, deminers, or individuals wearing little to no protection, there are four types of blast effects on the human body: overpressure (shock), fragmentation, impact, and heat. Overpressure refers to the sudden and drastic rise in ambient pressure that can damage the internal organs, possibly leading to permanent damage or death. Fragmentation can also include sand, debris and vegetation from the area surrounding the blast source. This is very common in anti-personnel mine blasts. The projection of materials poses a potentially lethal threat caused by cuts in soft tissues, as well as infections, and injuries to the internal organs. When the overpressure wave impacts the body it can induce violent levels of blast-induced acceleration. Resulting injuries may range from minor to unsurvivable. Immediately following this initial acceleration, deceleration injuries can occur when a person impacts directly against a rigid surface or obstacle after being set in motion by the force of the blast. Finally, injury and fatality can result from the explosive fireball as well as incendiary agents projected onto the body. Personal protective equipment, such as a bomb suit or demining ensemble, as well as helmets, visors and foot protection, can dramatically reduce the four effects, depending upon the charge, proximity and other variables.

== Types ==
Diagram of a simple time bomb in the form of a pipe bomb

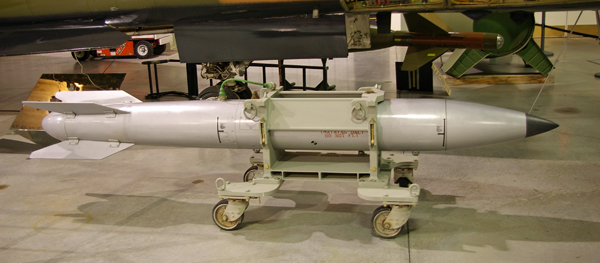
An American B61 nuclear bomb on its loading carriage

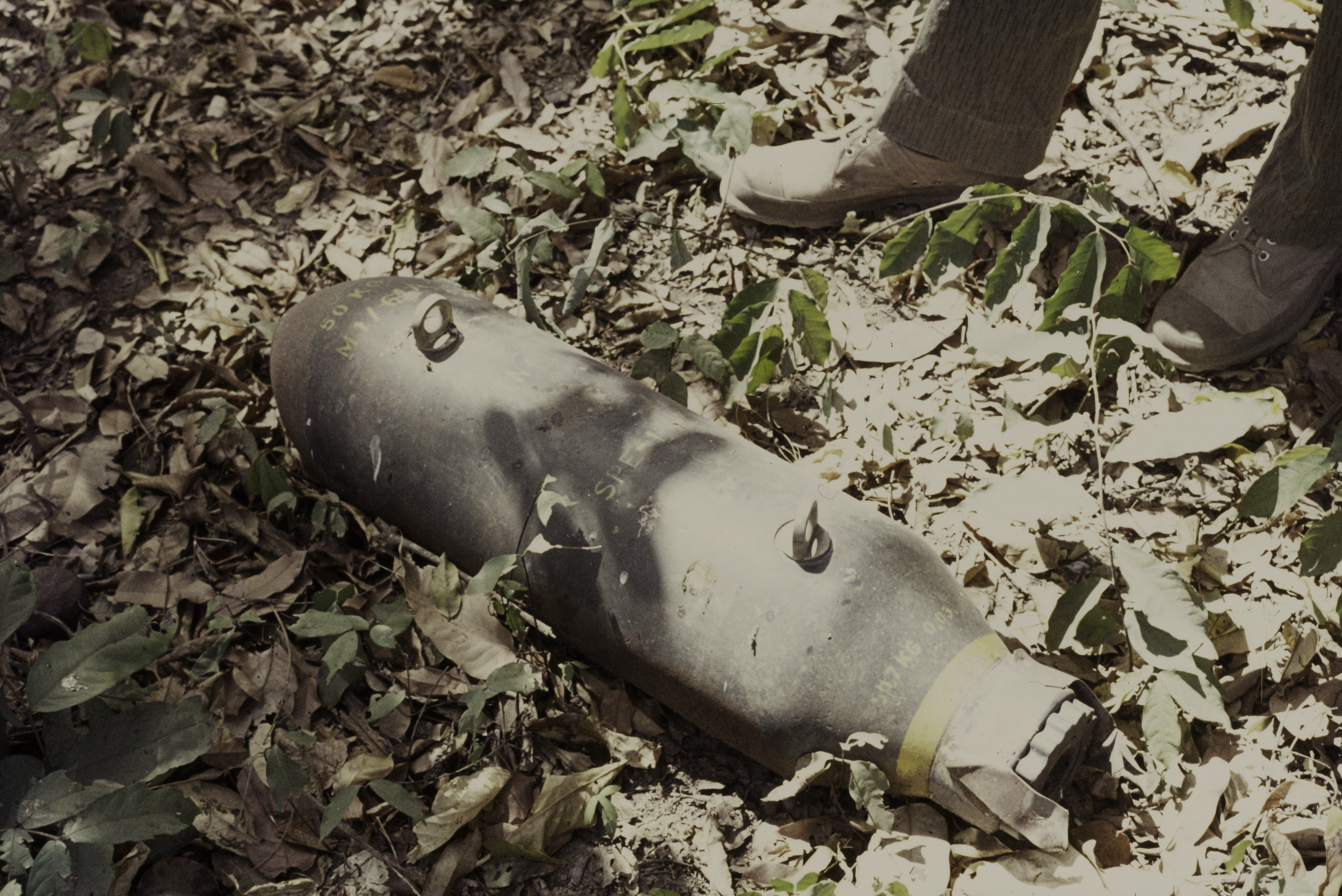
Unexploded unguided aerial bomb with contact fuse used by the Portuguese Air Force, Guinea-Bissau War of Independence, March 1974.

Experts commonly distinguish between civilian and military bombs. The latter are almost always mass-produced weapons, developed and constructed to a standard design out of standard components and intended to be deployed in a standard explosive device. IEDs are divided into three basic categories by basic size and delivery. Type 76, IEDs are hand-carried parcel or suitcase bombs, type 80, are "suicide vests" worn by a bomber, and type 3 devices are vehicles laden with explosives to act as large-scale stationary or self-propelled bombs, also known as VBIED (vehicle-borne IEDs).

Improvised explosive materials are typically unstable and subject to spontaneous, unintentional detonation triggered by a wide range of environmental effects, ranging from impact and friction to electrostatic shock. Even subtle motion, change in temperature, or the nearby use of cellphones or radios can trigger an unstable or remote-controlled device. Any interaction with explosive materials or devices by unqualified personnel should be considered a grave and immediate risk of death or dire injury. The safest response to finding an object believed to be an explosive device is to get as far away from it as possible.

Atomic bombs are based on the theory of nuclear fission, that when a large atom splits, it releases a massive amount of energy. Thermonuclear weapons, (colloquially known as "hydrogen bombs") use the energy from an initial fission explosion to create an even more powerful fusion explosion.

The term "dirty bomb" refers to a specialized device that relies on a comparatively low explosive yield to scatter harmful material over a wide area. Most commonly associated with radiological or chemical materials, dirty bombs seek to kill or injure and then to deny access to a contaminated area until a thorough clean-up can be accomplished. In the case of urban settings, this clean-up may take extensive time, rendering the contaminated zone virtually uninhabitable in the interim.

The power of large bombs is typically measured in kilotons (kt) or megatons of TNT (Mt). The most powerful bombs ever used in combat were the two atomic bombs dropped by the United States to attack Hiroshima and Nagasaki, and the most powerful ever tested was the Tsar Bomba. The most powerful non-nuclear bomb is Russian "Father of All Bombs" (officially Aviation Thermobaric Bomb of Increased Power (ATBIP)) followed by the United States Air Force's MOAB (officially Massive Ordnance Air Blast, or more commonly known as the "Mother of All Bombs").

Below is a list of five different types of bombs based on the fundamental explosive mechanism they employ.

=== Compressed gas ===
Relatively small explosions can be produced by pressurizing a container until catastrophic failure such as with a dry ice bomb. Technically, devices that create explosions of this type can not be classified as "bombs" by the definition presented at the top of this article. However, the explosions created by these devices can cause property damage, injury, or death. Flammable liquids, gasses and gas mixtures dispersed in these explosions may also ignite if exposed to a spark or flame.

=== Low explosive ===
The simplest and oldest bombs store energy in the form of a low explosive. Black powder is an example of a low explosive. Low explosives typically consist of a mixture of an oxidizing salt, such as potassium nitrate (saltpeter), with solid fuel, such as charcoal or aluminium powder. These compositions deflagrate upon ignition, producing hot gas. Under normal circumstances, this deflagration occurs too slowly to produce a significant pressure wave; low explosives, therefore, must generally be used in large quantities or confined in a container with a high burst pressure to be useful as a bomb.

=== High explosive ===
A high explosive bomb is one that employs a process called "detonation" to rapidly go from an initially high energy molecule to a very low energy molecule. Detonation is distinct from deflagration in that the chemical reaction propagates faster than the speed of sound (often many times faster) in an intense shock wave. Therefore, the pressure wave produced by a high explosive is not significantly increased by confinement as detonation occurs so quickly that the resulting plasma does not expand much before all the explosive material has reacted. This has led to the development of plastic explosive. A casing is still employed in some high explosive bombs, but with the purpose of fragmentation. Most high explosive bombs consist of an insensitive secondary explosive that must be detonated with a blasting cap containing a more sensitive primary explosive.

=== Thermobaric ===
A thermobaric bomb is a type of explosive that utilizes oxygen from the surrounding air to generate an intense, high-temperature explosion, and in practice the blast wave typically produced by such a weapon is of a significantly longer duration than that produced by a conventional condensed explosive. The fuel-air bomb is one of the best-known types of thermobaric weapons.

=== Nuclear fission ===
Nuclear fission type atomic bombs utilize the energy present in very heavy atomic nuclei, such as U-235 or Pu-239. In order to release this energy rapidly, a certain amount of the fissile material must be very rapidly consolidated while being exposed to a neutron source. If consolidation occurs slowly, repulsive forces drive the material apart before a significant explosion can occur. Under the right circumstances, rapid consolidation can provoke a chain reaction that can proliferate and intensify by many orders of magnitude within microseconds. The energy released by a nuclear fission bomb may be tens of thousands of times greater than a chemical bomb of the same mass.

=== Nuclear fusion ===
A thermonuclear weapon is a type of nuclear bomb that releases energy through the combination of fission and fusion of the light atomic nuclei of deuterium and tritium. With this type of bomb, a thermonuclear detonation is triggered by the detonation of a fission type nuclear bomb contained within a material containing high concentrations of deuterium and tritium. Weapon yield is typically increased with a tamper that increases the duration and intensity of the reaction through inertial confinement and neutron reflection. Nuclear fusion bombs can have arbitrarily high yields making them hundreds or thousands of times more powerful than nuclear fission.

A pure fusion weapon is a hypothetical nuclear weapon that does not require a primary fission stage to start a fusion reaction.

=== Antimatter ===
Antimatter bombs can theoretically be constructed, but antimatter is very costly to produce and hard to store safely.

=== Other ===
- Aerial bomb – designed to be dropped from a military aircraft (or even any aircraft) and carried on hardpoints or in bomb bays
- Delay-action bomb – explodes some time after impact, as opposed to before or on impact
- Dummy bomb – harmless bomb that has been fully disabled or has had its explosive contents removed, often used for training or display
- Glide bomb – features flight control surfaces, allowing it to glide fairly long distances to its target
- General-purpose bomb – aerial bomb dropped for multiple purposes, and thus designed to suit multiple purposes
- Incendiary bomb – designed to set targets ablaze
- Cluster bomb – releases additional submunitions, often smaller bombs, upon detonation
- Anti-runway penetration bomb – designed to destroy runways and aprons
- Bunker buster – capable of penetrating hardened or fortified surfaces before detonating
- Concrete bomb – contains dense, inert material (typically concrete) instead of explosives, using the kinetic energy of the falling bomb to destroy target
- Improvised explosive device – classification of bombs produced in unconventional ways or using unconventional materials; includes explosives such as the barrel bomb, nail bomb, pipe bomb, pressure cooker bomb, fertilizer bomb, and Molotov cocktail

== Delivery ==
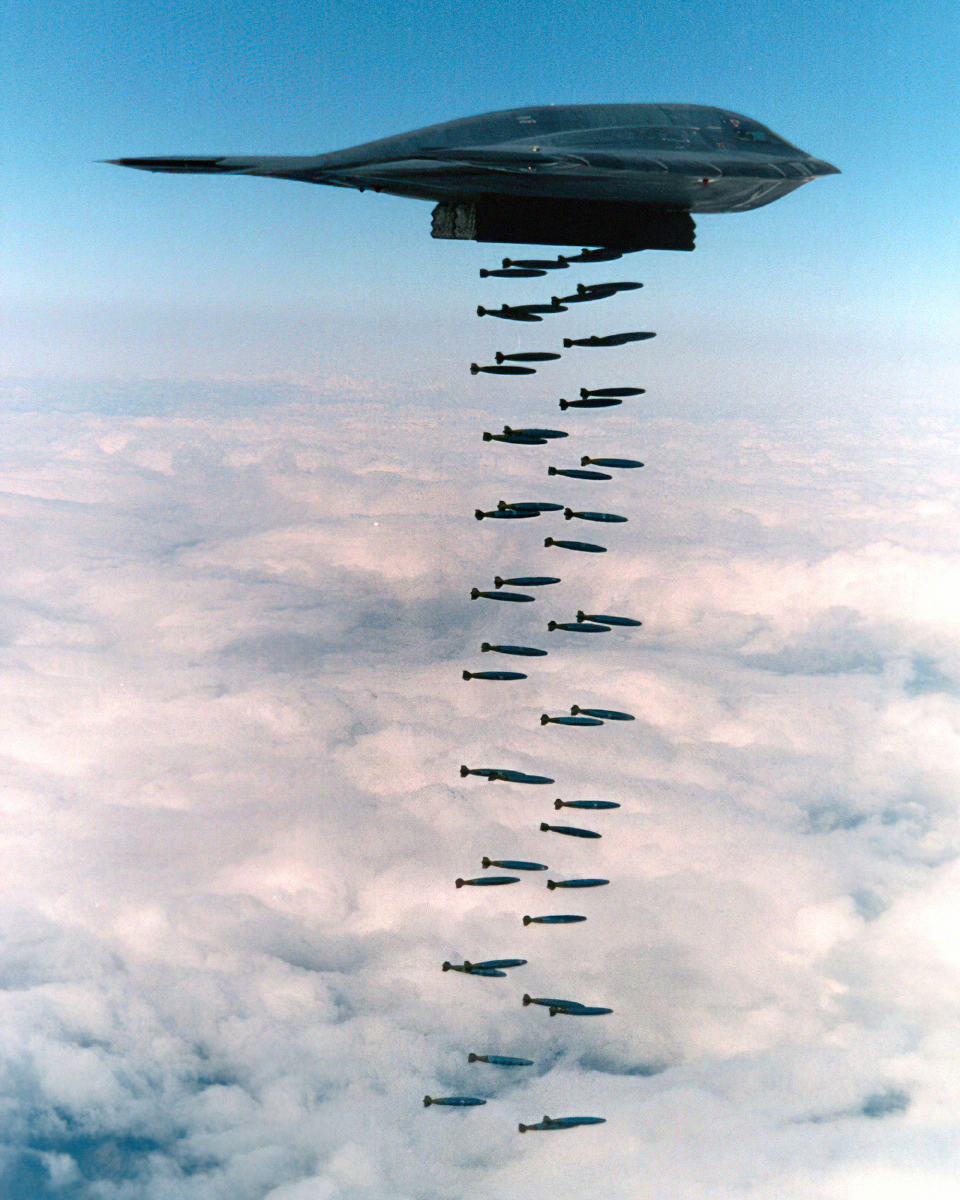
A B-2 Spirit drops forty-seven 500 lb (230 kg) class Mark 82 bombs (little more than half a B-2's maximum total ordnance payload) in a 1994 live fire exercise in California

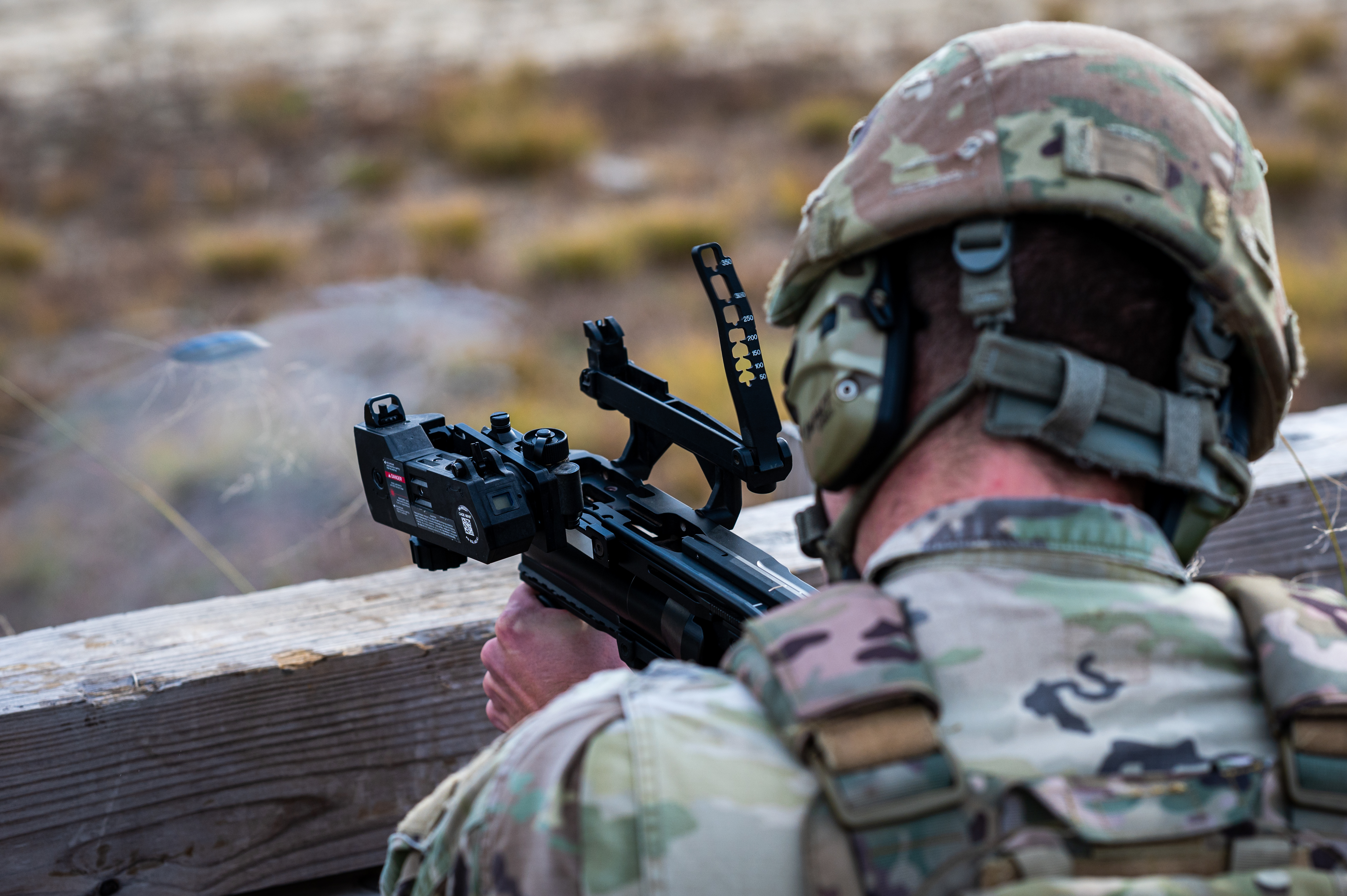
A United States National Guard soldier firing a 40 mm grenade from an M320 grenade launcher

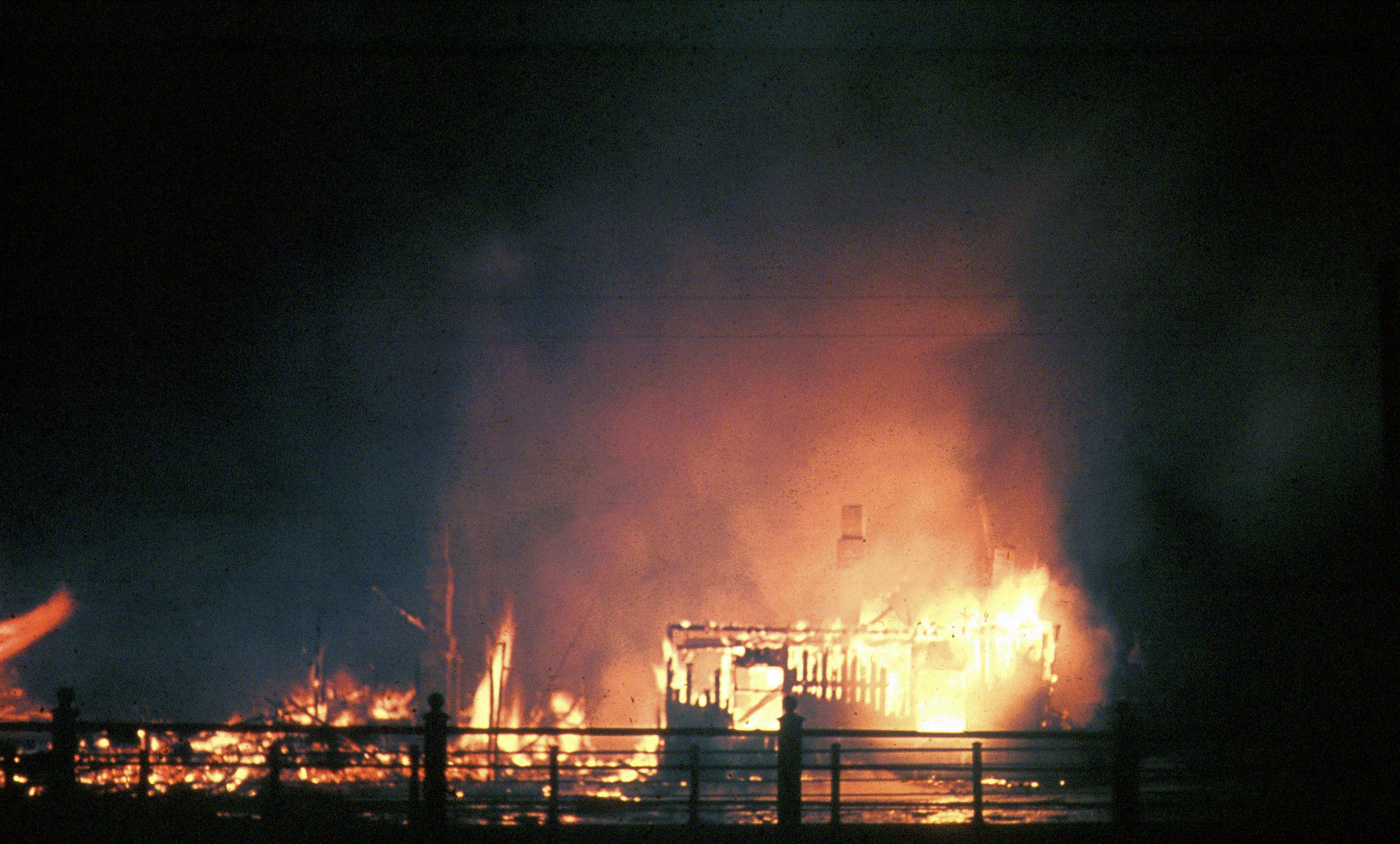
Destruction caused by Soviet bombing during the Continuation War in Helsinki, Finland, the night of February 6–7, 1944

The first air-dropped bombs were used by the Austrians in the 1849 siege of Venice. Two hundred unmanned balloons carried small bombs, although few bombs actually hit the city.

The first bombing from a fixed-wing aircraft took place in 1911 when the Italians dropped bombs by hand on the Turkish lines in what is now Libya, during the Italo-Turkish War. The first large scale dropping of bombs took place during World War I starting in 1915 with the German Zeppelin airship raids on London, England, and the same war saw the invention of the first heavy bombers. One Zeppelin raid on 8 September 1915 dropped 4,000 lb (1,800 kg) of high explosives and incendiary bombs, including one bomb that weighed 600 lb (270 kg).

During World War II bombing became a major military feature, and a number of novel delivery methods were introduced. These included Barnes Wallis's bouncing bomb, designed to bounce across water, avoiding torpedo nets and other underwater defenses, until it reached a dam, ship, or other destination, where it would sink and explode. By the end of the war, planes such as the allied forces' Avro Lancaster were delivering with 50 yd (46 m) accuracy from 20,000 ft (6,100 m), ten ton earthquake bombs (also invented by Barnes Wallis) named "Grand Slam", which, unusually for the time, were delivered from high altitude in order to gain high speed, and would, upon impact, penetrate and explode deep underground ("camouflet"), causing massive caverns or craters, and affecting targets too large or difficult to be affected by other types of bomb.

Modern military bomber aircraft are designed around a large-capacity internal bomb bay, while fighter-bombers usually carry bombs externally on pylons or bomb racks or on multiple ejection racks, which enable mounting several bombs on a single pylon. Some bombs are equipped with a parachute, such as the World War II "parafrag" (an 11 kg (24 lb) fragmentation bomb), the Vietnam War-era daisy cutters, and the bomblets of some modern cluster bombs. Parachutes slow the bomb's descent, giving the dropping aircraft time to get to a safe distance from the explosion. This is especially important with air-burst nuclear weapons (especially those dropped from slower aircraft or with very high yields), and in situations where the aircraft releases a bomb at low altitude. A number of modern bombs are also precision-guided munitions, and may be guided after they leave an aircraft by remote control, or by autonomous guidance.

Aircraft may also deliver bombs in the form of warheads on guided missiles, such as long-range cruise missiles, which can also be launched from warships.

A hand grenade is delivered by being thrown. Grenades can also be projected by other means, such as being launched from the muzzle of a rifle (as in the rifle grenade), using a grenade launcher (such as the M203), or by attaching a rocket to the explosive grenade (as in a rocket-propelled grenade (RPG)).

A bomb may also be positioned in advance and concealed.

A bomb destroying a rail track just before a train arrives will usually cause the train to derail. In addition to the damage to vehicles and people, a bomb exploding in a transport network often damages, and is sometimes mainly intended to damage, the network itself. This applies to railways, bridges, runways, and ports, and, to a lesser extent (depending on circumstances), to roads.

In the case of suicide bombing, the bomb is often carried by the attacker on their body, or in a vehicle driven to the target.

The Blue Peacock nuclear mines, which were also termed "bombs", were planned to be positioned during wartime and be constructed such that, if disturbed, they would explode within ten seconds.

The explosion of a bomb may be triggered by a detonator or a fuse. Detonators are triggered by clocks, remote controls like cell phones or some kind of sensor, such as pressure (altitude), radar, vibration or contact. Detonators vary in ways they work, they can be electrical, fire fuze or blast initiated detonators and others,

== Blast seat ==
In forensic science, the point of detonation of a bomb is referred to as its blast seat, seat of explosion, blast hole or epicenter. Depending on the type, quantity and placement of explosives, the blast seat may be either spread out or concentrated (i.e., an explosion crater).

Other types of explosions, such as dust or vapor explosions, do not cause craters or even have definitive blast seats.

== See also ==
- List of bombs
- Bomb suit

== Bibliography ==
- Andrade, Tonio (2016), The Gunpowder Age: China, Military Innovation, and the Rise of the West in World History, Princeton University Press, ISBN 978-0-691-13597-7.
