= List of bombs =

This is a list of the types of bombs.

Type	Information	Date created	Inventor	Place of origin
Antimatter bomb	Hypothetical bomb using matter-antimatter annihilation for high yields.			
Barrel bomb	Improvised unguided aerial bomb made from a barrel or barrel-shaped container filled with explosives. They can sometimes be filled with chemicals, shrapnel and oil.	1948		Israel
Blockbuster bomb	"High capacity" bomb for maximum blast effect, only used during World War II.	April 1941		United Kingdom
Bouncing bomb	Skips across water; designed to attack German dams in World War II.	April 1942	Barnes Wallis	United Kingdom
Bunker buster	A bunker buster is used to penetrate targets that are either deep underground or protected by hard surfaces. The first type of these was the Röchling shell.	1942	August Coenders	Germany
C4	A part of the Composition C family, a family of plastic explosives.	1956		
Car bomb	A vehicle is packed with explosives and detonated.			
Cluster bomb	Over a hundred nations outlaw them now. The first one was Butterfly Bomb.			Germany
General-purpose bomb	These bombs use thick metal as walls containing explosives such as Composition B or Tritonal.			
Glide bomb	A standoff weapon with flight control surfaces, aerodynamic devices that allow for control by the pilot.			
Guided bomb	Also known as "guided bomb unit" or the "smart bomb", these missiles carry a guidance system which is controlled and monitored from an external device.			
Improvised explosive device	An explosive that is not manufactured conventionally. They are sometimes termed as "homemade".			
Land mine	Explodes when pressure is applied to the bomb. Outlawed in 164 nations.	1832		Ming Dynasty
Laser guided bomb	Uses a laser as guidance to increase the accuracy of hitting its target.			United States
Molotov cocktail	Improvised incendiary grenade often made in a beer bottle.			
Nail bomb	An explosive packed with nails which upon ignition, acts like shrapnel.	1970		
Pipe bomb	An improvised explosive using a firmly sealed pipe filled with an explosive material.			
Pressure cooker bomb	The pressure of the pressure cooker places high explosive power.			
Smoke bomb	A firework that is designed to produce a large amount of smoke upon being ignited.	1848		United Kingdom
Stink bomb	Stink bombs range in effectiveness from simple pranks to military grade or riot control chemical agents.	1943		
Suicide vest or suicide bomber	An explosive on either a vest or a belt that is worn by its respective detonator.			China
Suitcase bomb	Nuclear bomb designed to fit inside a suitcase.	1950s		
Thermometric bomb	Also called a vacuum bomb, or aerosol bomb, this explosive disperses a cloud of gas or liquid.			
Time bomb	A bomb that is triggered by the timer.			
Trinitrotoluene	Commonly known as TNT.	1863	Julius Wilbrand	Germany
Unguided bomb	An air-craft dropped bomb that lacks a guidance system.			
MOAB	Massive Ordnance Air Burst. Colloquially known as the Mother of All Bombs.			United States
FOAB	Father of All Bombs.	2007		Russia
Electromagnetic bomb	Releases a burst of electromagnetic energy.	1962		
Napalm bomb	Contains an incendiary mixture used to cause a fire.			
Dirty bomb	Scatters radioactive material.			
Nuclear bomb	An explosive whose destructiveness is a result of nuclear reactions.	1945	J. Robert Oppenheimer and Gen. Leslie Groves	United States
Tsar Bomba	A thermonuclear aerial bomb which was the most powerful bomb created and tested in history.	October 1961		Soviet Union
Cobalt bomb	A nuclear bomb designed to spread as much radiation around as possible.			
Hydrogen bomb	Second-generation nuclear weapon design using non-fissile depleted uranium to create a nuclear fusion reaction.	1952	Edward Teller and Stanislaw Ulam	United States
Neutron bomb	A nuclear weapon designed to destroy with lethal radiation while not damaging structures.			
BLU-82	Used for creating clearings in forested areas.			
