= Agustín de Luque y Coca =

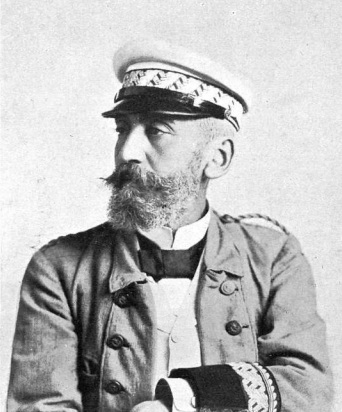
- General Luque, photographed by Kaulak

General Director of the Civil Guard
- In office 30 October 1913 – 10 December 1915
- Monarch: Alfonso XIII
- Prime Minister: Eduardo Dato
- Preceded by: Ramón Echagüe y Méndez Vigo
- Succeeded by: Enrique de Orozco
- In office 20 April – 26 June 1917
- Monarch: Alfonso XIII
- Prime Minister: Manuel García Prieto; Eduardo Dato
- Preceded by: Antonio Tovar y Marcoleta
- Succeeded by: Salvador Arizón y Sánchez Fano

Minister of War of Spain
- In office 1 December 1905 – 6 July 1906
- Monarch: Alfonso XIII
- Prime Minister: Segismundo Moret
- Preceded by: Valeriano Weyler
- Succeeded by: José López Domínguez
- In office 15 October – 4 December 1906
- Monarch: Alfonso XIII
- Prime Minister: José López Domínguez; Segismundo Moret
- Preceded by: José López Domínguez
- Succeeded by: Valeriano Weyler
- In office 21 October 1909 – 9 February 1910
- Monarch: Alfonso XIII
- Prime Minister: Segismundo Moret
- Preceded by: Arsenio Linares y Pombo
- Succeeded by: Ángel Aznar y Butigieg
- In office 3 April 1911 – 27 October 1913
- Monarch: Alfonso XIII
- Prime Minister: Count of Romanones
- Preceded by: Ángel Aznar y Butigieg
- Succeeded by: Ramón Echagüe y Méndez Vigo

Personal details
- Born: 1 October 1850 Málaga, Andalusia, Spain
- Died: 14 October 1937 (aged 87) Hendaye, Pyrénées-Atlantiques, France

Military service
- Allegiance: Spain
- Branch/service: Spanish Army
- Wars: Third Carlist War; Spanish-American War; Kert campaign

Agustin de Luque and Coca (1 October 1850 – 14 October 1937) was a Spanish military general and political war minister and director general of the Civil Guard.

== Biography ==
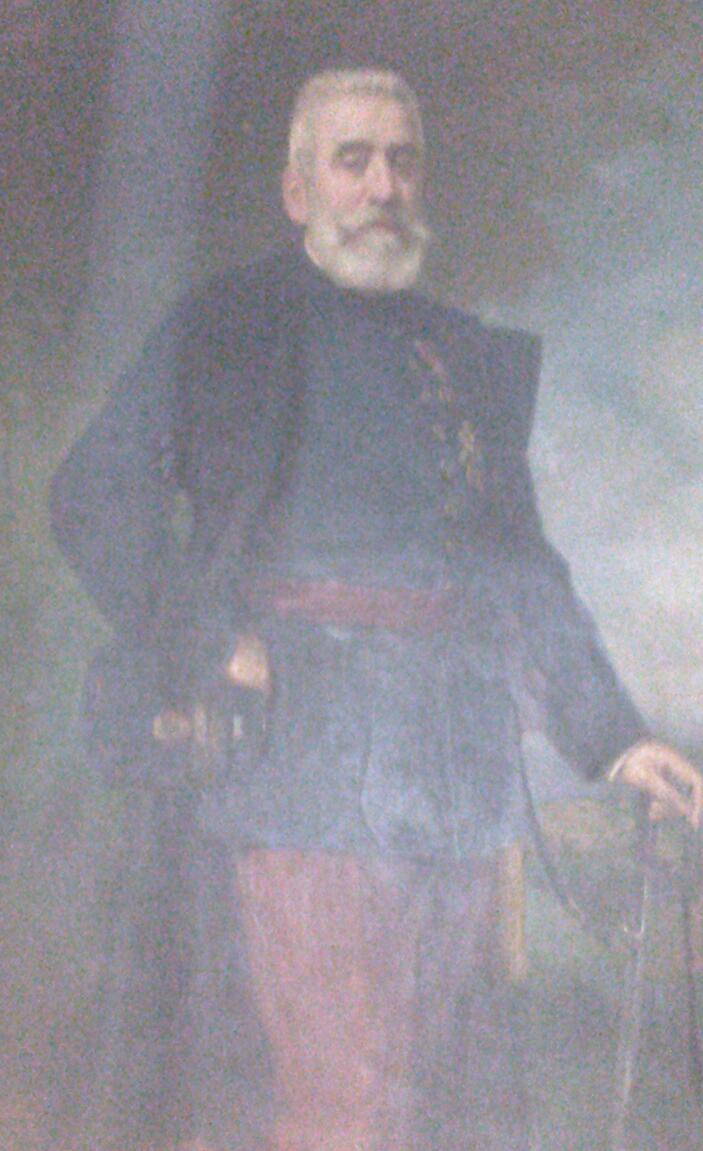
Painting of Agustin de Luque and Coca

He fought in the Third Carlist War and was stationed in Melilla and Cuba during the Spanish-American War, where he was promoted to major general.

He was linked to republicanism through Manuel Ruiz Zorrilla. He worked as chief of staff in the Ministry of War, where he served as minister four times (1905, 1906–1909, 1911, and 1912–1915). He was senator of the provinces of Palencia and Lugo from 1905 to 1908, to later be appointed senator for life in 1909.

In 1905 he was part of the primitive thermobaric weapon project headed by Antonio Meulener. Luque agreed to close the project by Meulener's petition.

He was director general of the Civil Guard on two occasions, between 30 October 1913 and 10 December 1915, and between 20 April 1917 and 26 June 1917. He is responsible for the approval of the Mandatory Military Service Law. On 6 October 1920 the Ministry of War issued a decree providing for the cessation of Lieutenant General Agustín Luque and Coca in the office of general commander of the Corps and headquarters Invalids and their place in the reserve for fulfilling the statutory age.

In 1925 he was appointed by the dictator Miguel Primo de Rivera as the president of the commission that drew up the project to create the National Service for Physical, Citizen and Pre-military Education.

== Bibliography ==
- Ficha en el Senado
