= CBU-72 =

Thermobaric cluster bomb used by the US

The CBU-72 was a 550-pound (250 kg) American fuel-air cluster bomb used by the United States Military until 1996. It was very effective against armored vehicles, aircraft parked in the open, bunkers, and minefields.

== Design ==
The CBU-72 consisted of three fuel-air explosive (FAE) submunitions. Each submunition weighed about 100 pounds (45 kg) and dispensed a cloud approximately 60 feet (18 m) in diameter and 8 feet (2.4 m) high, composed of its 75 pounds (34 kg) of ethylene oxide aerosol fuel across the target area, with air-burst fusing set for 30 feet (9.1 m). An embedded detonator ignited the cloud as it descended to the ground to produce a massive explosion. The high-pressure of the rapidly expanding wave front flattened all objects within close proximity of the center of the fuel cloud, as well as causing debilitating damage well beyond it. Like other FAE using ethylene oxide, in the event of non-ignition, it functions as a chemical weapon, due to the highly toxic nature of this gas.

== History of use ==
First-generation CBU-55 and CBU-72 fuel-air weapons were used in the Vietnam War. A second generation of FAE weapons were based on those, and were used by the United States in Iraq during Operation Desert Storm. A total of 254 CBU-72s were dropped by the United States Marine Corps, mostly from A-6Es. They were targeted against mine fields and personnel in foxholes, but were more useful as a psychological weapon.

After Desert Storm, the United States Navy and the Marine Corps removed their remaining FAE weapons from service, and by 1996, they had been transferred for demilitarization. By mid-2001, only a few hundred remained in existence, awaiting demilitarization.

== See also ==
- List of cluster bombs
