= Antonio Meulener =

Antonio Meulener Verdeguer
- Born: April 16, 1861; Algeciras, Spain
- Died: August 17, 1912 (aged 51)
- Military career
- Allegiance: Spain
- Branch: Army
- Service years: 1880-1912
- Rank: Captain
- Awards: Cross of Military Merit (1902 and 1905)

Antonio Meulener Verdeguer (April 16, 1861 - August 17, 1912) was a Spanish inventor and military man. He specialized in ballistics, chemistry and metallurgy. He invented multipurpose topographic tools and a possible primitive thermobaric weapon, the tóspiro, which he successfully tested before destroying and erasing it himself. He has been called the "Spanish Oppenheimer".

== Biography ==
Born in a military family in Algeciras, he joined the Toledo Infantry Academy in 1877, graduating in 1880 with the rank of ensign as the first of his promotion. He changed frequently his station the following years, serving in Madrid, Fraga and his native Algeciras in preparation to joining a general staff school he eventually discarded. In 1885, already a lieutenant, he presented his first invent, the bastón de Meulener, a military topographic tool which combined a compass, a goniometer, a heliograph, a rangefinder and many other calculus tools in one. For this and his scientific skill he was promoted, but his frail health and the death of his staff chief José Gámir forced him to wander the military again.

From 1898, he collaborated with Manuel Daza in an artillery project called tóspiro or tóxpiro. It was first tested in June 1898, during the Spanish–American War, with two simultaneous field tests, in the Pelayo battleship in Cádiz under Daza and in Sierra Nevada in Guadix under Meulener. The first version of the project was seemingly an artillery-based chemical weapon, which killed livestock aboard a barge without damaging it. The Spanish government was not interested in the weapon, so Daza continued developing weapons privately and abandoned it after a failed test, but Meulener was moved to Toledo to continue the official project under Agustín de Luque y Coca. His work in a new incarnation of the tóspiro, an "aerial torpedo" he presented to Valeriano Weyler, gained him the Cross of Military Merit in 1902, and again in 1905 for a cryptograph tool he had previously created.

In 1912 Meulener, with his health rapidly declining due to tuberculosis, presumably caused or worsened by contact with chemical elements in his work, rushed to test a perfected tóspiro before his death. Details of the experiment are sparse, but the seemed to involve a warhead loaded with indeterminate elements primed with successive explosions, which has been theorized to be a primitive thermobaric weapon. During its main field test, performed in Toledo, the device was fired through a Krupp cannon against a mountainous area with livestock. According to staff member Luis Bermúdez de Castro and the Civil Guard, which secured the zone, the explosion left no trace of life in kilometers and was felt like an earthquake in Toledo, causing panic in the nearby towns. Meulener had predicted it would leave toxic effects for weeks, but the effects were even greater than expected, with Meulener falling ill after he and Bermúdez tried to survey the zone personally after a month.

Meulener himself was so horrified that he voluntarily closed the project before dying one year later. In his last will he asked Luque to delete all documentation "due to the great danger it posed for mankind", which Luque honored.
