= Thunder crash bomb =

10th-century Chinese hand grenade

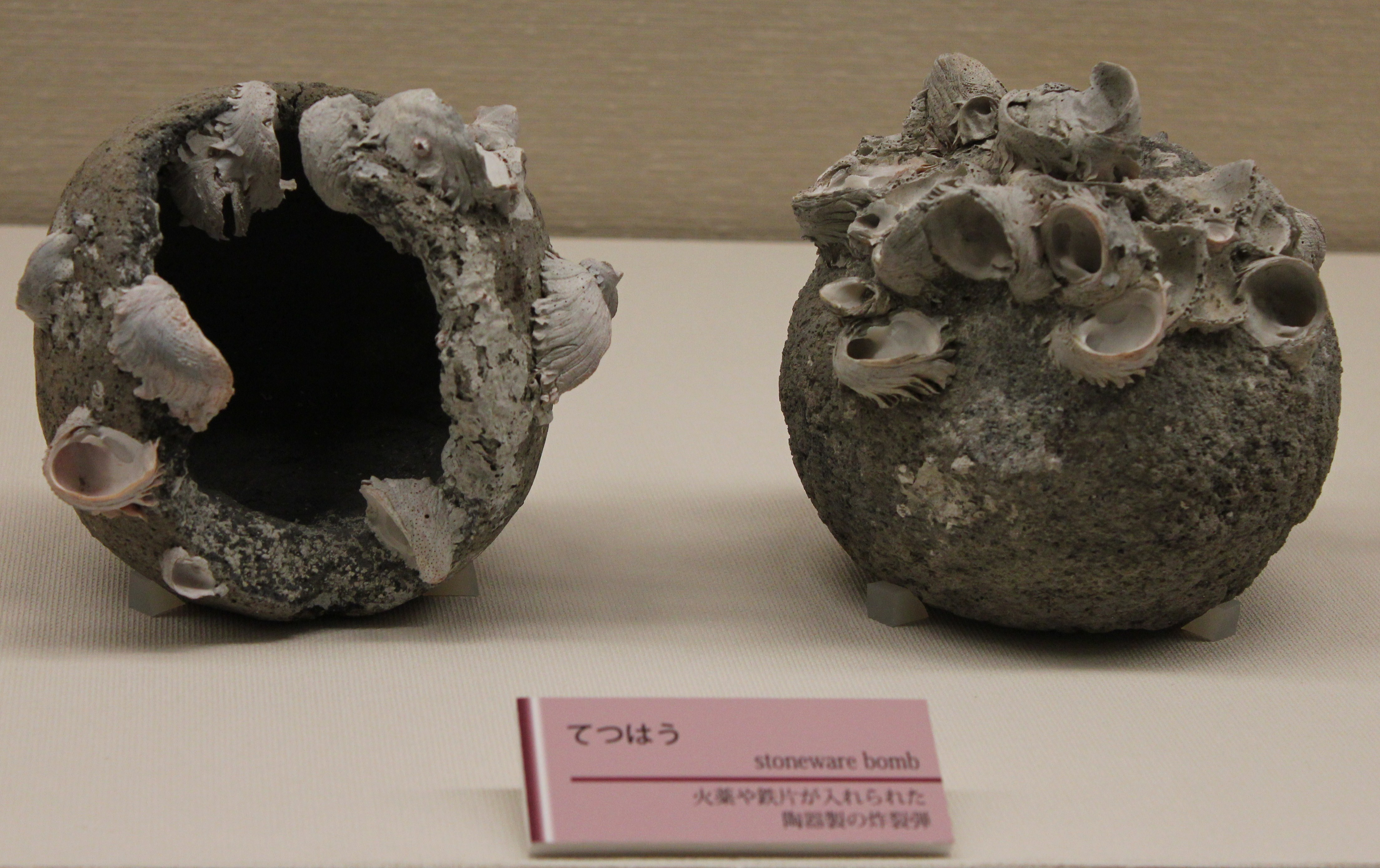
Ceramic thunder crash bombs used by the Yuan army in 1274 during the first Mongol invasion of Japan

The thunder crash bomb (Chinese: 震天雷; pinyin: zhèntiānléi), also known as the heaven-shaking-thunder bomb, was one of the first bombs or hand grenades in the history of gunpowder warfare. It was developed in the 12th–13th century Song and Jin dynasties. Its shell was made of cast iron and filled with gunpowder. The length of the fuse could be adjusted according to the intended throwing distance.

== History ==
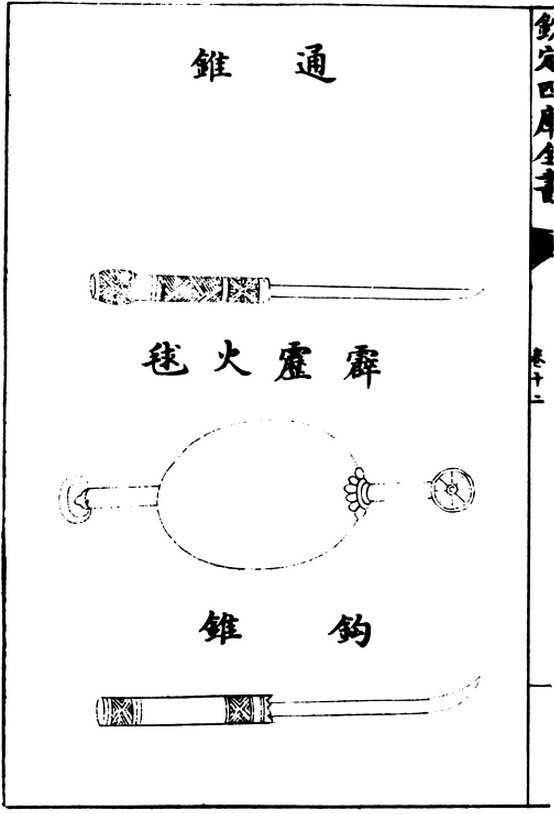
An illustration of a thunderclap bomb as depicted in the 1044 text Wujing Zongyao. The top item is a through awl and the bottom one is a hook awl, used to ignite the projectile before it was hurled.

=== Thunderclap bomb (pilipao) ===
The zhentianlei (thunder-crash/heaven-shaking-thunder) bomb was not the first bomb. Gunpowder bombs had been mentioned since the 11th century. In 1000 AD, a soldier by the name of Tang Fu (唐福) demonstrated a design of gunpowder pots (a proto-bomb which spews fire) and gunpowder caltrops, for which he was richly rewarded. In the military text Wujing Zongyao of 1044, bombs such as the "ten-thousand fire flying sand magic bomb", "burning heaven fierce fire unstoppable bomb", and "thunderclap bomb" (pilipao) were mentioned. However these were soft-shell bombs and did not use metal casings.

During the Siege of Kaifeng in 1126, the Song defenders used thunderclap bombs against the Jin invaders: "At night the thunderclap bombs were used, hitting the lines of the enemy well, and throwing them into great confusion. Many fled, screaming in fright." Thunderclap bombs were also used at sea. In 1129, the Song decreed that all warships were to be fitted with trebuchets for hurling gunpowder bombs. Song forces took a victory in 1161 when Song paddle boats ambushed a Jin transport fleet, launched thunderclap bombs, and drowned the Jin force in the Yangtze. According to the account, the bombs used paper casings.

The men inside them paddled fast on the treadmills, and the ships glided forwards as though they were flying, yet no one was visible on board. The enemy thought that they were made of paper. Then all of a sudden a thunderclap bomb was let off: It was made with paper (carton) and filled with lime and sulphur. (Launched from trebuchets) these thunderclap bombs came dropping down from the air, and upon meeting the water exploded with a noise like thunder, the sulphur bursting into flames. The carton case rebounded and broke, scattering the lime to form a smoky fog which blinded the eyes of men and horses so that they could see nothing. Our ships then went forward to attack theirs, and their men and horses were all drowned, so that they were utterly defeated.

— Hai Qiu Fu

According to the Wujing Zongyao, the thunderclap bomb's case was made of bamboo and wrappings:

The thunderclap bomb contains a length of two or three internodes of dry bamboo with a diameter of 1.5 in. There must be no cracks, and the septa are to be retained to avoid any leakage. Thirty pieces of thin broken porcelain the size of iron coins are mixed with 3 or 4 lb of gunpowder, and packed around the bamboo tube. The tube is wrapped within the ball, but with about an inch or so protruding at each end. A (gun)powder mixture is then applied all over the outer surface of the ball.

— Wujing Zongyao

Jin troops withdrew with a ransom of Song silk and treasure but returned several months later with their own gunpowder bombs manufactured by captured Song artisans. Records show that the Jin used gunpowder arrows and trebuchets to hurl gunpowder bombs while the Song retaliated with gunpowder arrows, fire bombs, thunderclap bombs, and a weapon called the "molten metal bomb" (金汁炮). As the Jin account describes, when they attacked the city's Xuanhua Gate, their "fire bombs fell like rain, and their arrows were so numerous as to be uncountable." According to historian Wang Zhaochun, the account of this battle provided the "earliest truly detailed descriptions of the use of gunpowder weapons in warfare."

The molten metal bomb appeared again in 1129 when Song general Li Yanxian (李彥仙) clashed with Jin forces while defending a strategic pass. The Jin assault lasted day and night without respite, using siege carts, fire carts, and sky bridges, but each assault was met with Song soldiers who "resisted at each occasion, and also used molten metal bombs. Wherever the gunpowder touched, everything would disintegrate without a trace." The molten metal bomb was likely an explosive that contained molten metal and gunpowder.

According to a minor military official by the name of Zhao Wannian (趙萬年), thunderclap bombs were used again to great effect by the Song during the Jin siege of Xiangyang in 1206–1207. Both sides had gunpowder weapons, but the Jin troops only used gunpowder arrows for destroying the city's moored vessels. The Song used fire arrows, fire bombs, and thunderclap bombs. Fire arrows and bombs were used to destroy Jin trebuchets. The thunderclap bombs were used on Jin soldiers themselves, causing foot soldiers and horsemen to panic and retreat. "We beat our drums and yelled from atop the city wall, and simultaneously fired our thunderclap missiles out from the city walls. The enemy cavalry was terrified and ran away." The Jin were forced to retreat and make camp by the riverside. In a rare occurrence, the Song made a successful offensive on Jin forces and conducted a night assault using boats. They were loaded with gunpowder arrows, thunderclap bombs, a thousand crossbowmen, five hundred infantry, and a hundred drummers. Jin troops were surprised in their encampment while asleep by loud drumming, followed by an onslaught of crossbow bolts, and then thunderclap bombs, which caused a panic of such magnitude that they were unable to even saddle themselves and trampled over each other trying to get away. Two to three thousand Jin troops were slaughtered along with eight to nine hundred horses.

=== Hard-shell explosives ===
Between the pilipao and zhentianlei, explosives transitioned from soft to hard casings. The iron bomb made its first appearance in 1221 at the siege of Qizhou (in modern Hubei province), when the Jin captured Song artisans to manufacture an ‘’iron bomb’’. The Song commander Zhao Yurong (趙與褣) survived and was able to relay his account for posterity.

Qizhou was a major fortress city situated near the Yangtze and a twenty-five thousand strong Jin army advanced on it in 1221. News of the approaching army reached Zhao Yurong in Qizhou, and despite being outnumbered nearly eight to one, he decided to hold the city. Qizhou's arsenal consisted of some three thousand thunderclap bombs, twenty thousand "great leather bombs" (皮大炮), and thousands of gunpowder arrows and gunpowder crossbow bolts. While the formula for gunpowder had become potent enough to consider the Song bombs to be true explosives, they were unable to match the explosive power of the Jin iron bombs. Yurong describes the uneven exchange thus: "The barbaric enemy attacked the Northwest Tower with an unceasing flow of catapult projectiles from thirteen catapults. Each catapult shot was followed by an iron fire bomb [catapult shot], whose sound was like thunder. That day, the city soldiers in facing the catapult shots showed great courage as they maneuvered [our own] catapults, hindered by injuries from the iron fire bombs. Their heads, their eyes, their cheeks were exploded to bits, and only one half [of the face] was left." Jin artillerists were able to successfully target the command center itself: "The enemy fired off catapult stones ... nonstop day and night, and the magistrate's headquarters [帳] at the eastern gate, as well as my own quarters ..., were hit by the most iron fire bombs, to the point that they struck even on top of [my] sleeping quarters and [I] nearly perished! Some said there was a traitor. If not, how would they have known the way to strike at both of these places?"

Zhao was able to examine the new iron bombs himself and described them: "In shape they are like gourds, but with a small mouth. They are made with pig iron, about two inches thick, and they cause the city's walls to shake." Houses were blown apart, towers battered, and defenders blasted from their placements. Within four weeks all four gates were under heavy bombardment. Finally the Jin made a frontal assault on the walls and scaled them, after which followed a merciless hunt for soldiers, officers, and officials of every level. Zhao managed an escape by clambering over the battlement and making a hasty retreat across the river, but his family remained in the city. Upon returning at a later date to search the ruins, he found that the "bones and skeletons were so mixed up that there was no way to tell who was who."

=== Heaven shaking thunder bomb (zhentianlei) ===
The zhentianlei "heaven-shaking-thunder" bomb was an iron-casing bomb used by the Jin dynasty against the Mongols.

In 1211, the Mongols made a concerted effort to conquer the Jin, which would not be accomplished until 1234. In 1232, the Mongols besieged the Jin capital of Kaifeng and deployed gunpowder weapons along with other more conventional siege techniques such as building stockades, watchtowers, trenches, guardhouses, and forcing Chinese captives to haul supplies and fill moats. Jin scholar Liu Qi (劉祈) recounts in his memoir, "the attack against the city walls grew increasingly intense, and bombs rained down as [the enemy] advanced." The Jin defenders also deployed gunpowder bombs as well as fire arrows (huo jian 火箭) launched using a type of early solid-propellant rocket. Of the bombs, Liu Qi writes, "From within the walls the defenders responded with a gunpowder bomb called the heaven-shaking-thunder bomb (震天雷). Whenever the [Mongol] troops encountered one, several men at a time would be turned into ashes." They caused "many casualties, and when not wounded by the explosions were burnt to death by the fires they caused."

The History of Jin describes the bombs thus: "The heaven-shaking-thunder bomb is an iron vessel filled with gunpowder. When lighted with fire and shot off, it goes off like a crash of thunder that can be heard for a hundred li [thirty miles], burning an expanse of land more than half a mu [所爇圍半畝之上, a mu is a sixth of an acre], and the fire can even penetrate iron armor." A Ming official named He Mengchuan would encounter an old cache of these bombs three centuries later in the Xi'an area: "When I went on official business to Shaanxi Province, I saw on top of Xi'an's city walls an old stockpile of iron bombs. They were called 'heaven-shaking-thunder' bombs, and they were like an enclosed rice bowl with a hole at the top, just big enough to put your finger in. The troops said they hadn't been used for a very long time." Furthermore, he wrote, "When the powder goes off, the bomb rips open, and the iron pieces fly in all directions. That is how it is able to kill people and horses from far away."

Heaven-shaking-thunder bombs, also known as thunder crash bombs, were used prior to the siege in 1231 when a Jin general made use of them in destroying a Mongol warship. The Jin general, named Wanyan Eke, had lost the defense of Hezhong to the Mongols and fled on ships with 3,000 of his men. The Mongols pursued them with their ships until the Jin broke through by using thunder crash bombs that caused flashes and flames. However, during the siege, the Mongols responded by protecting themselves with elaborate screens of thick cowhide. This was effective enough for workers to get right up to the walls to undermine their foundations and excavate protective niches. Jin defenders countered by tying iron cords and attaching them to heaven-shaking-thunder bombs, which were lowered down the walls until they reached the place where the miners worked. The protective leather screens were unable to withstand the explosion, and were penetrated, killing the excavators.

Another weapon the Jin employed was an improved version of the fire lance called the flying fire lance. The History of Jin provides a detailed description: "To make the lance, use chi-huang paper, sixteen layers of it for the tube, and make it a bit longer than two feet. Stuff it with willow charcoal, iron fragments, magnet ends, sulfur, white arsenic [probably an error that should mean saltpeter], and other ingredients, and put a fuse to the end. Each troop has hanging on him a little iron pot to keep fire [probably hot coals], and when it's time to do battle, the flames shoot out the front of the lance more than ten feet, and when the gunpowder is depleted, the tube isn't destroyed." While Mongol soldiers typically held a view of disdain toward most Jin weapons, apparently they greatly feared the flying fire lance and heaven-shaking-thunder bomb. Kaifeng managed to hold out for a year before the Jin emperor fled and the city capitulated. In some cases, Jin troops still fought with some success, scoring isolated victories such as when a Jin commander led 450 fire lancers against a Mongol encampment, which was "completely routed, and three thousand five hundred were drowned." Even after the Jin emperor committed suicide in 1234, one loyalist gathered all the metal he could find in the city he was defending, even gold and silver, and made explosives to lob against the Mongols, but the momentum of the Mongol Empire could not be stopped. By 1234, both the Western Xia and Jin dynasty had been conquered.

=== Japan ===
A Mongol thunder crash bomb thrown against a charging Japanese samurai during the Mongol invasions of Japan after founding the Yuan Dynasty, 1281.

Shortly after the Mongol invasions of Japan (1274–1281), the Japanese produced a scroll painting depicting a bomb. Called tetsuhau in Japanese, the bomb is speculated to have been the Chinese thunder crash bomb. Japanese descriptions of the invasions also talk of iron and bamboo pao causing "light and fire" and emitting 2–3,000 iron bullets. The Nihon Kokujokushi, written around 1300, mentions huo tong (fire tubes) at the Battle of Tsushima in 1274 and the second coastal assault led by Holdon in 1281. The Hachiman Gudoukun of 1360 mentions iron pao "which caused a flash of light and a loud noise when fired." The Taiheki of 1370 mentions "iron pao shaped like a bell."

The commanding general kept his position on high ground, and directed the various detachments as need be with signals from hand-drums. But whenever the (Mongol) soldiers took to flight, they sent iron bomb-shells (tetsuho) flying against us, which made our side dizzy and confused. Our soldiers were frightened out of their wits by the thundering explosions; their eyes were blinded, their ears deafened, so that they could hardly distinguish east from west. According to our manner of fighting, we must first call out by name someone from the enemy ranks, and then attack in single combat. But they (the Mongols) took no notice at all of such conventions; they rushed forward all together in a mass, grappling with any individuals they could catch and killing them.

— Hachiman Gudoukun

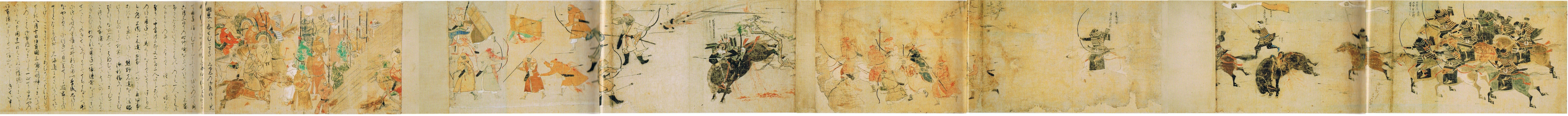
The samurai Takezaki Suenaga facing Mongol and Korean arrows and bombs.

== Bibliography ==
- Andrade, Tonio (2016), The Gunpowder Age: China, Military Innovation, and the Rise of the West in World History, Princeton University Press, ISBN 978-0-691-13597-7.
- Liang, Jieming (2006), Chinese Siege Warfare: Mechanical Artillery & Siege Weapons of Antiquity, Singapore, Republic of Singapore: Leong Kit Meng, ISBN 978-981-05-5380-7
- Needham, Joseph (1971), Science and Civilization in China, Volume 4 Part 3, Cambridge University Press
- Needham, Joseph (1976), Science and Civilization in China, Volume 5 Part 3, Cambridge University Press
- Needham, Joseph (1980), Science & Civilisation in China, Volume 5 Part 4, Cambridge University Press, ISBN 978-0-521-08573-1
- Needham, Joseph (1986), Science & Civilisation in China, Volume 5 Part 7: The Gunpowder Epic, Cambridge University Press, ISBN 978-0-521-30358-3
- Purton, Peter (2009), A History of the Early Medieval Siege c. 450–1200, The Boydell Press
- Purton, Peter (2010), A History of the Late Medieval Siege, 1200–1500, Boydell Press, ISBN 978-1-84383-449-6
