= CBU-55 =

Thermobaric cluster bomb used by the US

The CBU-55 was a cluster bomb fuel–air explosive that was developed during the Vietnam War by the United States Air Force, and was used only infrequently in that conflict. Unlike most incendiaries, which contained napalm or phosphorus, the 750-pound (340 kg) CBU-55 was fueled primarily by propane. Described as "the most powerful non-nuclear weapon in the U.S. arsenal" until then, the device was one of the most powerful conventional weapons designed for warfare.

== Design ==
The device had compartment with propane, and another compartment with explosive, designed to spread and ignite fuel.

The CBU-55 had two variations. The CBU-55/B consisted of 3 BLU-73A/B fuel-air explosive sub-munitions in a SUU-49/B Tactical Munitions Dispenser, and the CBU-55A/B had 3 BLU-73A/B sub-munitions in a SUU-49A/B dispenser). The SUU-49/B dispenser could be carried only by helicopters or low-speed aircraft, whereas the SUU-49A/B was redesigned with a strongback and folding tailfins, so that they could also be delivered by high-speed aircraft as well.

== History ==
The first generation of the CBU-55 was used during the Vietnam War, but only in a test mode by US forces. In 1971, a team from the Air Force Weapons Center at Eglin Air Force Base brought test versions of the CBU-55 to Southeast Asia for testing on two lower speed attack aircraft, the A-37 and the A-1. In late 1971, the team worked with the 604th Special Operations Squadron A-37 pilots at Bien Hoa Air Base to fly a handful of combat test missions. In December of that year, that same team came to Nahkon Phanom Royal Thai Air Base (NKP) to do the same tests with the 1st Special Operation Squadron, flying the A-1. On Nov 6th, Dec 2nd, 5th, and 8th, four two ship A-1 sorties were flown, carrying four each of the CBU-55. The NKP test project officer and flight lead for these three missions, Capt. Randy Jayne, helped the Eglin team write up the test results, which were overall not positive. The unusual deployment sequence for the three propane canisters, and the fact that they fell under small parachutes highly susceptible to significant wind drift, made delivery accuracy and aircraft survivability (when releasing low enough to minimize that wind drift) questionable. Also, the very high drag characteristics of the CBU-55 canister, with its flat back end, severely limited the A-1's ability to carry other bombs, rockets, and CBU, a further negative issue. In February/March 1972 US Navy Light Attack Squadron 4 (VAL-4) based at Can Tho delivered several sorties with the OV-10 Bronco, in support of US Army and ARVN joint operations north of the Mekong River. The ordnance was considered experimental, and teams of pathologists were flown to the drop sites to examine weapon effects on enemy remains.

Although the Air Force chose, based on the Bien Hoa and NKP tests, not to deploy the weapon to the two combat units in-theater, an inventory of the canisters was kept. By April 21, 1975, South Vietnam had largely been conquered by the People's Army of Vietnam (PAVN). Earlier in the month, a single CBU-55 had been flown to Bien Hoa. The senior US military officer in Vietnam, Major General Homer D. Smith, cleared the way for the Saigon government to use the weapon against the PAVN. An RVNAF C-130 transport plane circled Xuan Loc at 20,000 feet (6,100 m), then dropped the bomb. The contents exploded in a fireball over a 4-acre (16,000 m^{2}) area. Experts estimated that 250 soldiers had been killed, primarily by the immediate depletion of oxygen rather than from burns. The CBU-55 was never used again in the war, and South Vietnam's government surrendered on April 30.

A second generation of the CBU-55 (and CBU-72) fuel-air weapons entered the United States military arsenal after the Vietnam War, and were used by the United States in Iraq during Operation Desert Storm.

== See also ==
- List of cluster bombs
