= Hui Chen =

American physicist

Hui Chen is an American physicist, currently at Lawrence Livermore National Laboratory and an Elected Fellow of the American Physical Society.
