= Antimatter weapon =

Theoretical weapon using antimatter

An antimatter weapon is a theoretically possible device using antimatter as a power source, a propellant, or an explosive for a weapon. Antimatter weapons are currently too costly and unreliable to be viable in warfare, as producing antimatter is enormously expensive (estimated at US$6 billion for every 100 nanograms), the quantities of antimatter generated are very small, and current technology has great difficulty containing antimatter, which annihilates upon touching ordinary matter.

The paramount advantage of such a theoretical weapon is that antimatter and matter collisions result in the entire sum of their mass energy equivalent being released as energy, which is at least two orders of magnitude greater than the energy release of the most efficient fusion weapons (100% vs 0.4–1%). Annihilation requires and converts exactly equal masses of antimatter and matter by the collision which releases the entire mass-energy of both, which for 1 gram is ~9×10^{13} joules. Using the convention that 1 kiloton TNT equivalent equals 4.184×10^{12} joules (or one trillion calories of energy), one half gram of antimatter reacting with one half gram of ordinary matter (one gram total) results in 21.5 kilotons-equivalent of energy (slightly more powerful than the atomic bomb dropped on Nagasaki in 1945).

== Cost ==
As of July 2024, the cost of producing one millionth of a gram of antimatter was estimated at US $62 billion. By way of comparison, the cost of the Manhattan Project (to produce the first atomic bomb) is estimated at US$23 billion in 2007 prices. As such, Hui Chen of Lawrence Livermore National Laboratory dismissed concerns about antimatter bombs in 2008 as "unrealistic".

== Antimatter-catalyzed weapons ==
Antimatter-catalyzed nuclear pulse propulsion proposes the use of antimatter as a "trigger" to initiate small nuclear explosions; the explosions provide thrust to a spacecraft. The same technology could theoretically be used to make very small and possibly "fission-free" (very low nuclear fallout) weapons (see pure fusion weapon).

== In popular culture ==
An antimatter weapon is a part of the plot of the Dan Brown book Angels & Demons and its film adaptation, where it is used in a plot to blow up the Vatican City.

The Ground Zero expansion pack of the video game Quake II requires the protagonist to manufacture an Antimatter Bomb in the Munitions Plant to achieve the final objective.

In the Star Trek franchise, Federation starships are armed with photon torpedoes which contain antimatter warheads.
