= Father of All Bombs =

Russian thermobaric bomb

"The Father of All Bombs" (FOAB)
- FOAB schematic
- Type: Thermobaric
- Place of origin: Russia

Production history
- Designer: Russian Armed Forces
- Produced: 2007

Specifications
- Mass: 7,100 kg (15,650 lb)
- Filling: High explosive and fine aluminium powder and ethylene oxide mix.
- Blast yield: 44 t (97,000 lb) of TNT

Aviation Thermobaric Bomb of Increased Power (ATBIP), (Note: Russian: Авиационная вакуумная бомба повышенной мощности (АВБПМ), romanized as Aviatsonnaya vakuumaya bomba povyshennoy moshchnosti (AVBPM) or scientifically transliterated as Aviacionnaja vakuumaja povyšennoj bomba moščnosti.) nicknamed "Father of All Bombs" (FOAB; Russian: "Папа всех бомб", Пвб (Note: Transliterated as Papa vsekh bomb (PVB))), is a Russian-designed, bomber-delivered thermobaric weapon.

This weapon was claimed to be the most powerful conventional (non-nuclear) weapon in the world, more powerful than GBU-43/B Massive Ordnance Air Blast (MOAB), which is often unofficially called "Mother of All Bombs".

FOAB was successfully field-tested in the late evening of 11 September 2007.

== Claims ==
Fireball blast from the Russian "Father of All Bombs", with the beginnings of a mushroom cloud

The FOAB device uses about seven tons of a new type of high explosive and allegedly yields the equivalent of 44 tonnes of TNT (180 GJ), quadruple that of the American MOAB. Because of this, the bomb's blast and pressure wave have a similar effect to a small tactical nuclear weapon. The bomb works by detonating in mid-air. Thermobaric weapons differ from conventional explosive weapons in that they use atmospheric oxygen (rather than an oxidizing agent) to generate a longer, more sustained blast wave with greater temperatures. In doing so, they can produce more damage over a larger area than a conventional weapon of similar mass.

According to General Aleksandr Rukshin, the Russian Deputy Chief of the General Staff, the new bomb was smaller than the MOAB but much deadlier because the temperature at the centre of the blast is twice as high.

== Analysis and veracity ==
Some defense analysts question both the yield of the bomb and whether it could be deployed by a Tupolev Tu-160 bomber. A report by Wired says photos and the video of the event suggest that it is designed to be deployed from the rear of a slow moving cargo plane, and they note that the bomb-test video released by the Russians never shows both the bomb and the bomber in the same camera shot. There are also questions on what type of explosives it used. They quoted Tom Burky, a senior research scientist at Battelle, saying "It's not even clear what kind of weapon the Russians tested." He questions if it was what some experts call a fuel-air explosive or if it was a thermobaric weapon. "Fuel-air and thermobaric bombs differ in usefulness". Burky says that the weapon depicted in the video appears to be a fuel-air explosive, based on its shape.

Weapons analyst Sascha Lange of German SWP speaking at Deutsche Welle pointed out multiple discrepancies in the released Russian video and expressed his skepticism about the Russian claim.

John Pike, an analyst at the think tank GlobalSecurity, says he believes the weapon is roughly as powerful as the Russians claim. What he does not necessarily believe is that the weapon is new. He says the Russians have possessed a range of thermobaric weapons for at least four decades.

Robert Hewson, an editor for Jane's Information Group, told the BBC it was likely that FOAB indeed represented the world's biggest non-nuclear bomb. "You can argue about the numbers and how you scale this but the Russians have a long and proven history of developing weapons in the thermobaric class", he says.

UPI claimed the device "would enormously boost Russia's conventional military capabilities".

== See also ==
- Earthquake bomb
- Grand Slam (bomb)
- Massive Ordnance Penetrator
- Soviet atomic bomb project
- Tsar Bomba
