= Thermobaric weapon =

Device producing a high-temperature explosion

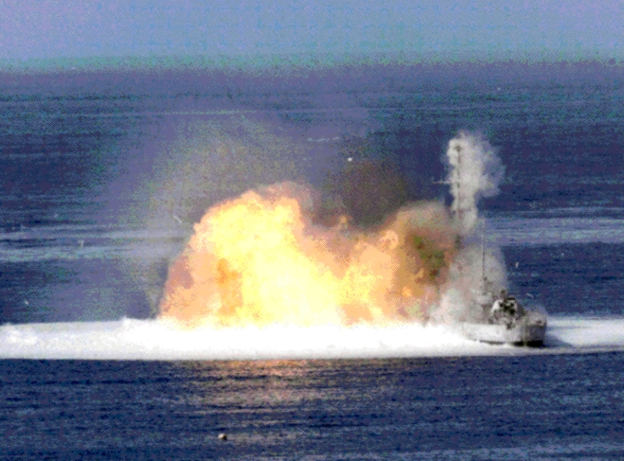
Blast from a US Navy fuel–air explosive used against a decommissioned ship, USS McNulty, 1972

A thermobaric weapon, also called an aerosol bomb, or a vacuum bomb, is a type of explosive munition that works by dispersing an aerosol cloud of gas, liquid or powdered explosive. This allows the chemical combustion to proceed using atmospheric oxygen, so that the weapon does not need to include an oxidizer.

The fuel is usually a single compound, rather than a mixture of multiple substances. Many types of thermobaric weapons can be fitted to hand-held launchers, and can also be launched from airplanes.

== Terminology ==
The term thermobaric is derived from the Greek words for 'heat' and 'pressure': thermobarikos (θερμοβαρικός), from thermos (θερμός) 'hot' + baros (βάρος) 'weight, pressure' + suffix -ikos (-ικός) '-ic'.

Other terms used for the family of weapons are high-impulse thermobaric weapons, heat and pressure weapons, vacuum bombs, and fuel-air explosives (FAE).

== Mechanism ==
Demonstration of an open-air dust explosion

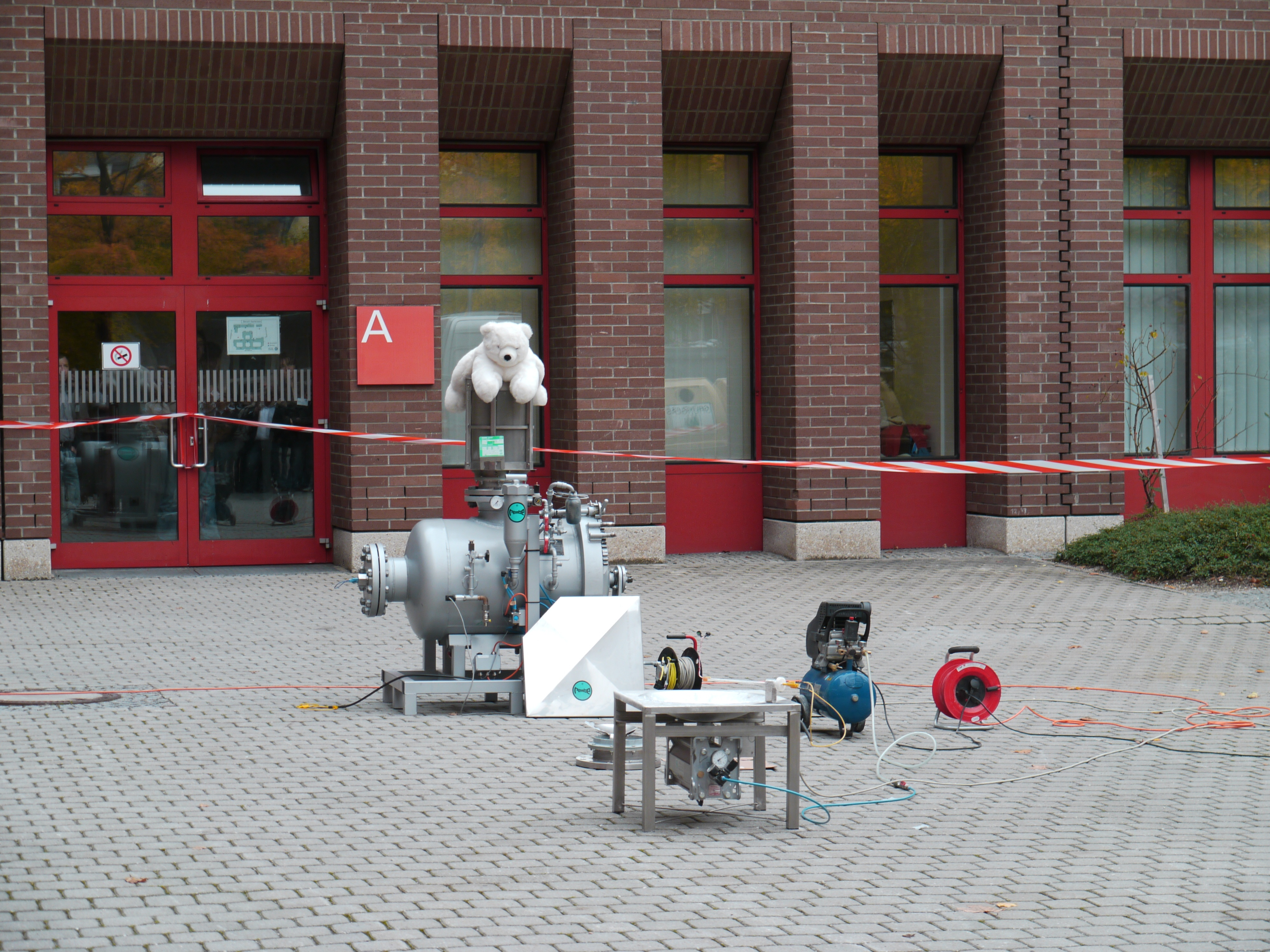
Experimental setup

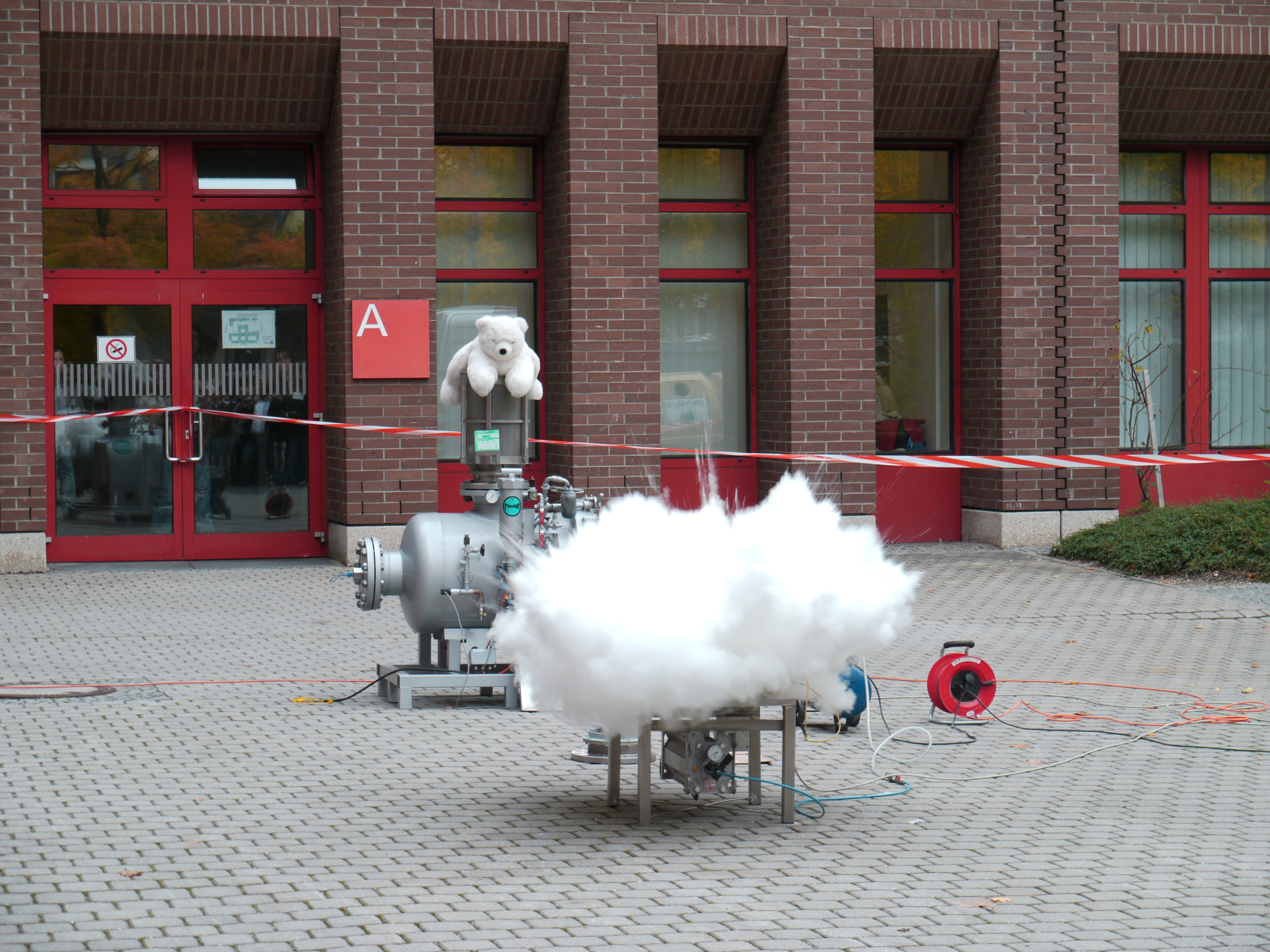
Finely-ground flour is dispersed

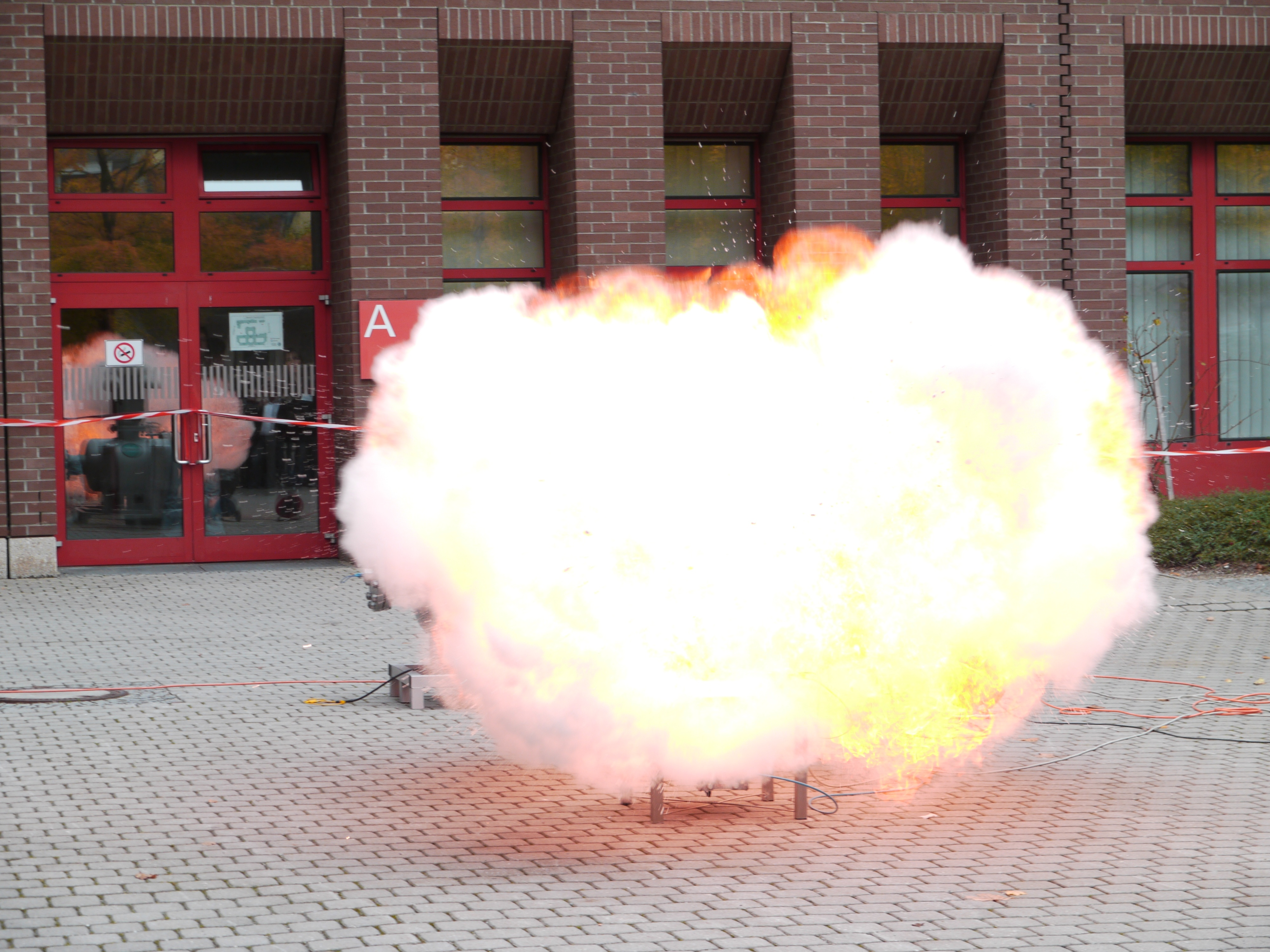
Cloud of flour is ignited

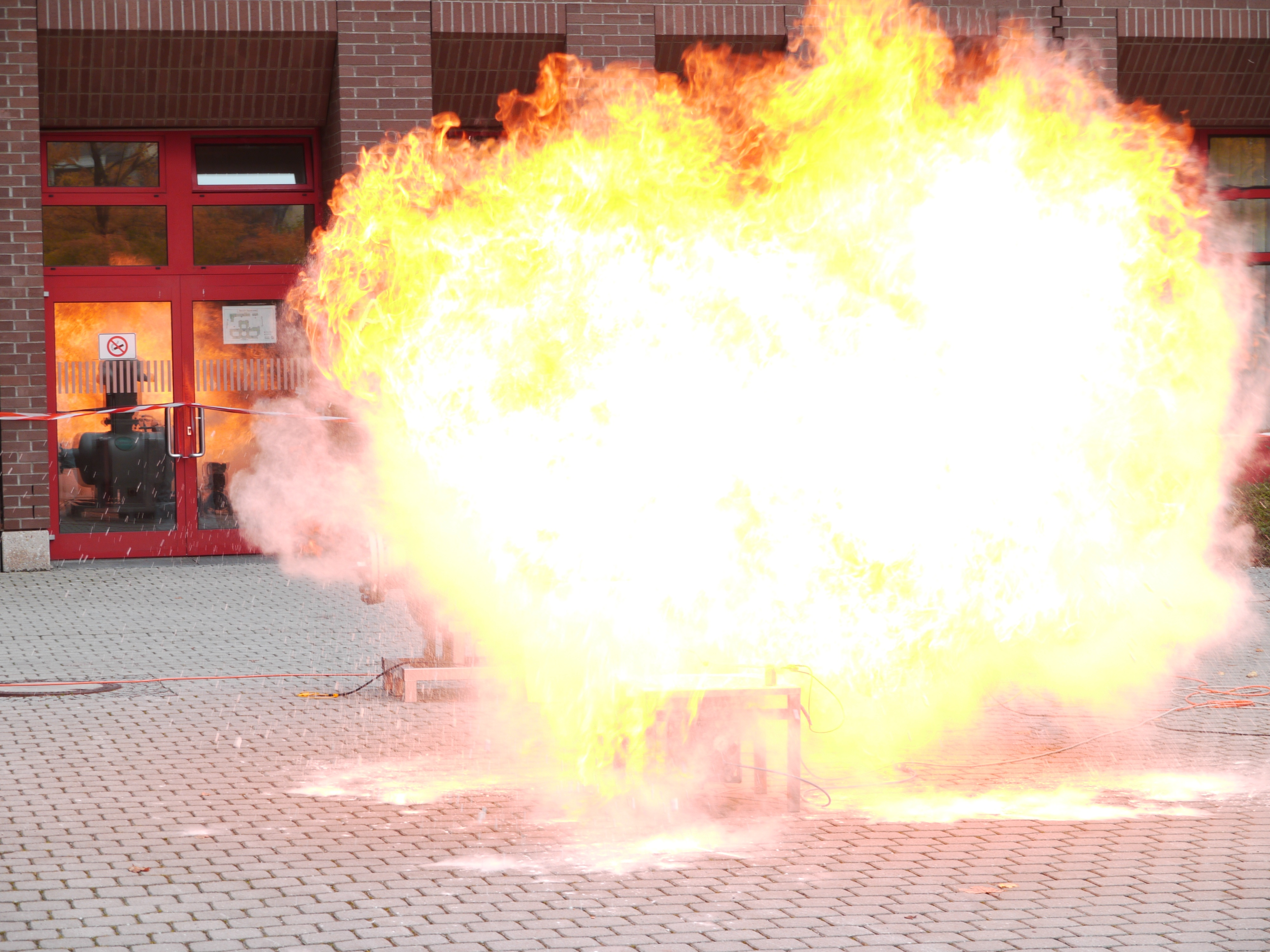
Fireball spreads rapidly

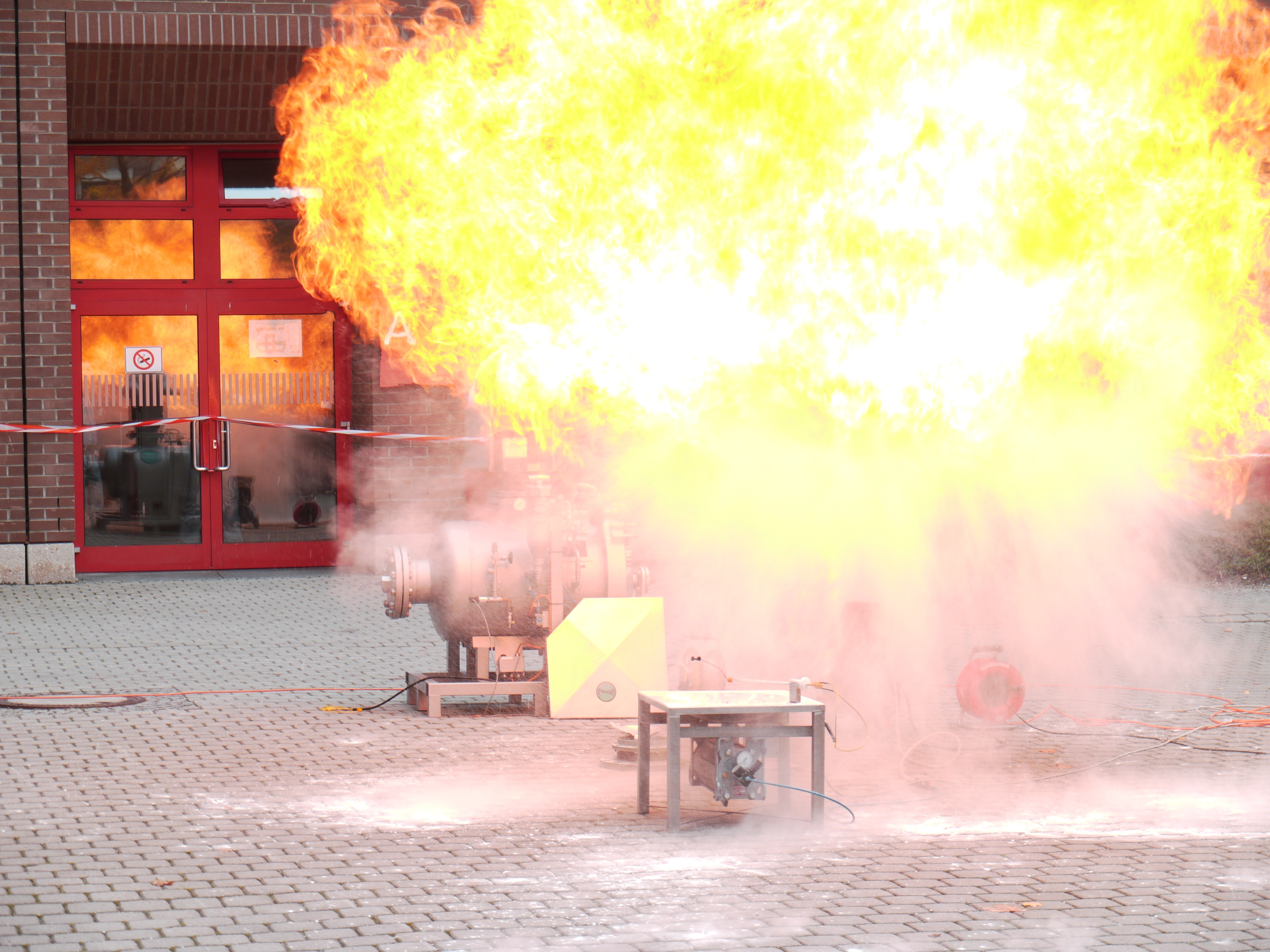
Intense radiant heat has nothing to ignite here

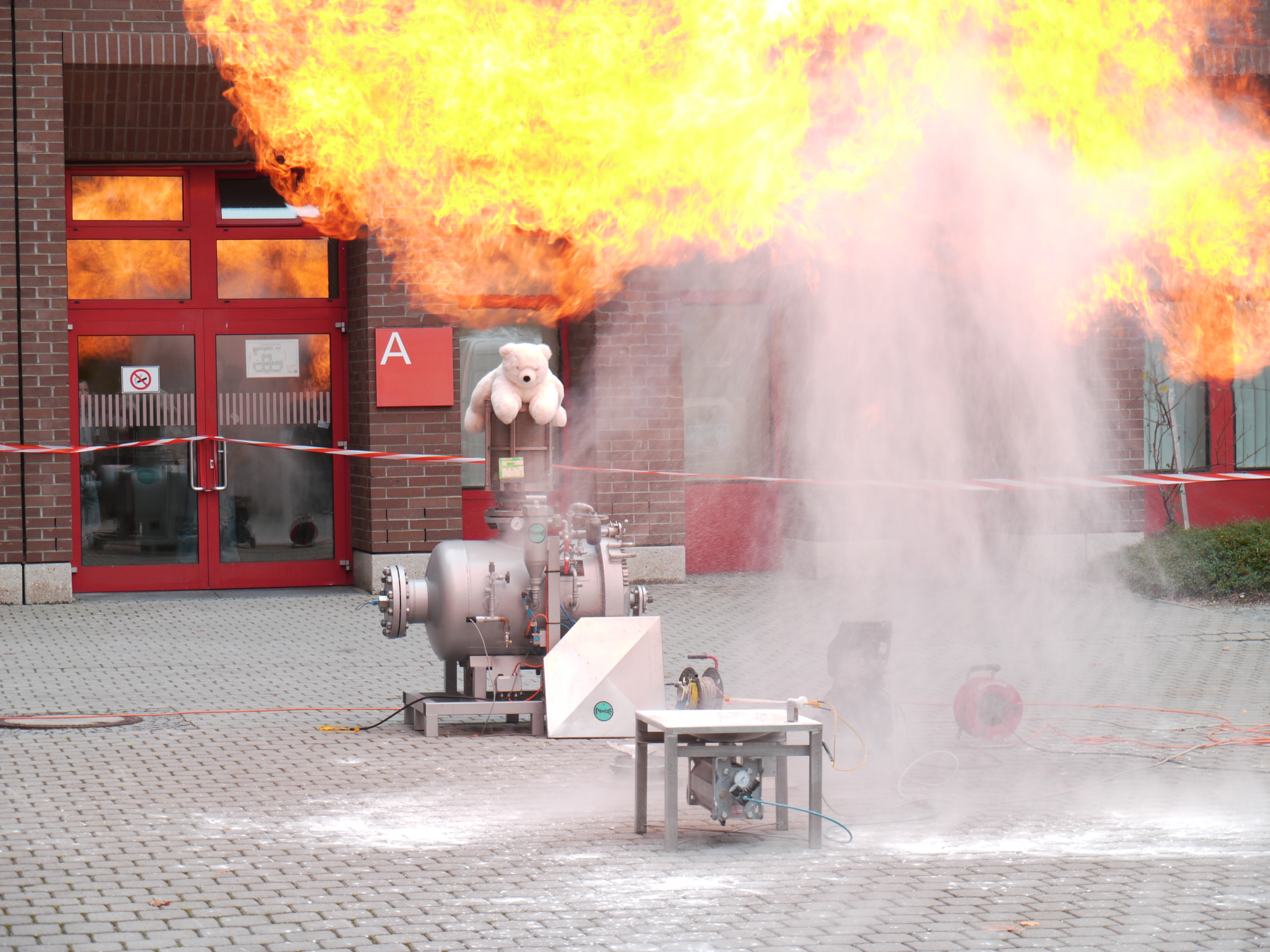
Fireball and superheated gases rise

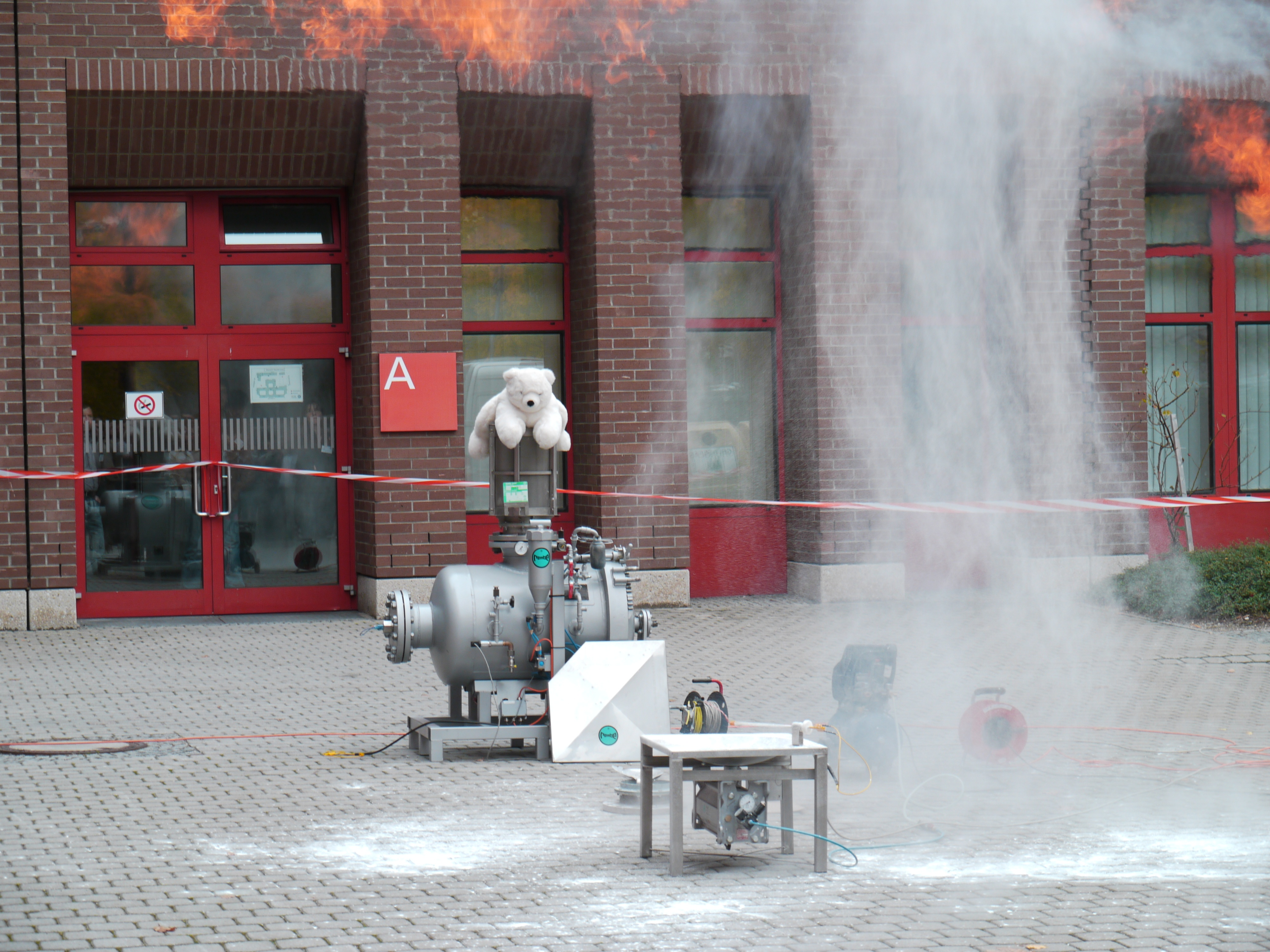
Aftermath of explosion, with unburned flour on the ground

Most conventional explosives consist of a fuel–oxidizer premix, where the oxygen needed to sustain the combustion is present inside the mix. By contrast, thermobaric weapons consist only of fuel and as a result are significantly more energetic than conventional explosives of equal weight. Their reliance on atmospheric oxygen makes them unsuitable for use underwater, at high altitude, and in adverse weather. They are, however, considerably more effective when used in enclosed spaces such as tunnels, buildings, and non-hermetically sealed field fortifications (foxholes, bunkers).

The initial explosive charge detonates as it hits its target, opening the container and dispersing the fuel mixture as a cloud. The typical blast wave of a thermobaric weapon lasts significantly longer than that of a conventional explosive.

In contrast to an explosive that uses oxidation in a confined region to produce a blast front emanating from a single source, a thermobaric flame front accelerates to a large volume, which produces pressure fronts within the mixture of fuel and oxidant and then also in the surrounding air.

Thermobaric explosives apply the principles underlying accidental unconfined vapor cloud explosions, which include those from dispersion of flammable dusts and droplets. Such dust explosions happened most often in flour mills and their storage containers, grain bins (such as wheat and corn silos), and earlier in coal mines, prior to the 20th century. More recent unconfined vapor cloud explosions happen most often in partially or completely empty oil tankers, refinery tanks, and vessels, such as the Buncefield fire in the United Kingdom in 2005, where the blast wave woke people 150 kilometres (93 mi) from its center.

A typical weapon consists of a container packed with a fuel substance, the center of which has a small conventional-explosive "scatter charge". Fuels are chosen on the basis of the exothermicity of their oxidation, ranging from powdered metals, such as aluminum or magnesium, to organic materials, possibly with a self-contained partial oxidant. The most recent development involves the use of nanofuels.

A thermobaric bomb's effective yield depends on a combination of a number of factors such as how well the fuel is dispersed, how rapidly it mixes with the surrounding atmosphere, the initiation of the igniter and its position relative to the container of fuel. In some designs, strong munitions cases allow the blast pressure to be contained long enough for the fuel to be heated well above its autoignition temperature so that once the container bursts, the superheated fuel autoignites progressively as it comes into contact with atmospheric oxygen. Conventional upper and lower limits of flammability apply to such weapons. Close in, blast from the dispersal charge, compressing and heating the surrounding atmosphere, has some influence on the lower limit. The upper limit has been demonstrated to influence the ignition of fogs above pools of oil strongly. That weakness may be eliminated by designs in which the fuel is preheated well above its ignition temperature so that its cooling during its dispersion still results in a minimal ignition delay on mixing. The continual combustion of the outer layer of fuel molecules, as they come into contact with the air, generates added heat which maintains the temperature of the interior of the fireball, and thus sustains the detonation.

In confinement, a series of reflective shock waves is generated, which maintain the fireball and can extend its duration to between 10 and 50 ms as exothermic recombination reactions occur. Further damage can result as the gases cool and pressure drops sharply, leading to a partial vacuum. This rarefaction effect has given rise to the term "vacuum bomb". Piston-type afterburning is also believed to occur in such structures, as flame-fronts accelerate through it.

=== Fuel–air explosive ===
A fuel–air explosive (FAE) device consists of a container of fuel and two separate explosive charges. After the munition is dropped or fired, the first explosive charge bursts open the container at a predetermined height and disperses the fuel in a cloud that mixes with atmospheric oxygen (the size of the cloud varies with the size of the munition). The cloud of fuel flows around objects and into structures. The second charge then detonates the cloud and creates a massive blast wave. The blast wave can destroy reinforced buildings, destroy equipment, and kill or injure people. The blast wave's antipersonnel effect is magnified in confined spaces, such as foxholes, tunnels, bunkers and caves.

==== Effects ====
Conventional countermeasures such as barriers (sandbags) and personnel armor are not effective against thermobaric weapons. A Human Rights Watch report of 1 February 2000 quotes a study made by the US Defense Intelligence Agency:

The [blast] kill mechanism against living targets is unique—and unpleasant. ... What kills is the pressure wave, and more importantly, the subsequent rarefaction [vacuum], which ruptures the lungs. ... If the fuel deflagrates but does not detonate, victims will be severely burned and will probably also inhale the burning fuel. Since the most common FAE fuels, ethylene oxide and propylene oxide, are highly toxic, undetonated FAE should prove as lethal to personnel caught within the cloud as with most chemical agents.

According to a US Central Intelligence Agency study:

the effect of an FAE explosion within confined spaces is immense. Those near the ignition point are obliterated. Those at the fringe are likely to suffer many internal, invisible injuries, including burst eardrums and crushed inner ear organs, severe concussions, ruptured lungs and internal organs, and possibly blindness.

Another Defense Intelligence Agency document speculates that, because the "shock and pressure waves cause minimal damage to brain tissue ... it is possible that victims of FAEs are not rendered unconscious by the blast, but instead suffer for several seconds or minutes while they suffocate".

== Development ==
=== Germany ===
The first attempts occurred during World War I when incendiary shells (in German 'Brandgranate') used a slow but intense burning material, such as tar-impregnated tissue and gunpowder dust. These shells burned for approximately 2 minutes after the shell exploded and spread the burning elements in every direction. In World War II, the German Wehrmacht attempted to develop a thermobaric weapon, under the direction of the Austrian physicist Mario Zippermayr.

=== United States ===
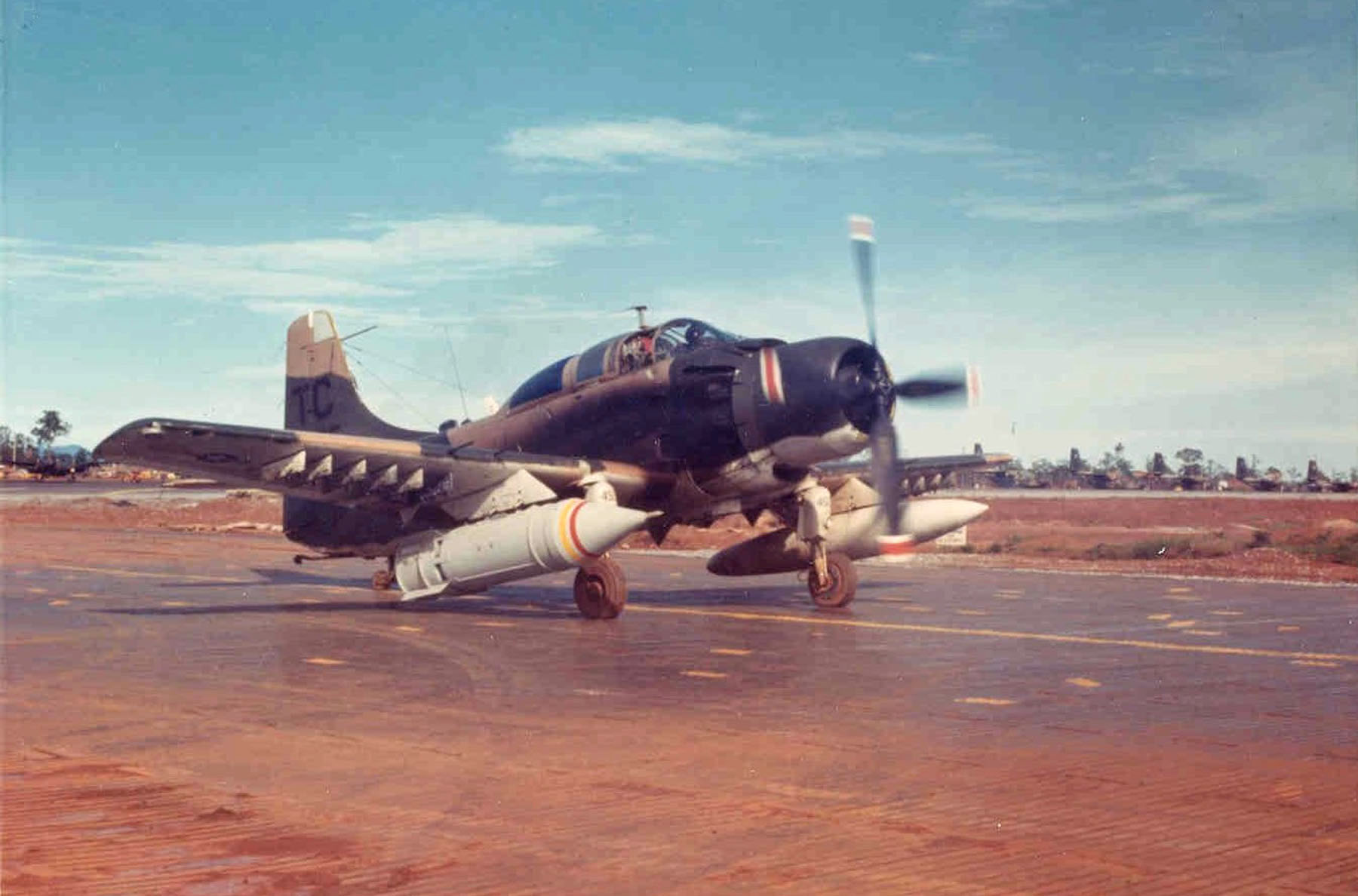
A BLU-72/B bomb on a USAF A-1E taking off from Nakhon Phanom in Thailand, in September 1968

FAEs were developed by the United States for use in the Vietnam War. The CBU-55 FAE fuel-air cluster bomb was mostly developed by the US Naval Weapons Center at China Lake, California.

American FAE munitions in use include the following:

- BLU-73 FAE I
- BLU-95 500 lb (230 kg) (FAE-II)
- BLU-96 2,000 lb (910 kg) (FAE-II)
- CBU-72 FAE I
- AGM-114 Hellfire missile (AGM-114N MAC)
- XM1060 grenade
- SMAW-NE round for rocket launcher

The XM1060 40-mm grenade is a small-arms thermobaric device, which was fielded by US forces in Afghanistan in 2002, and proved to be useful against targets in enclosed spaces, such as caves. Since the 2003 invasion of Iraq, the US Marine Corps introduced a thermobaric "Novel Explosive" (SMAW-NE) round for the Mk 153 SMAW rocket launcher. One team of Marines reported that they had destroyed a large one-story masonry type building with one round from 100 yards (91 m). The AGM-114N Hellfire II, uses a Metal Augmented Charge (MAC) warhead, which contains a thermobaric explosive fill that uses aluminum powder coated or mixed with PTFE layered between the charge casing and a PBXN-112 explosive mixture. When the PBXN-112 detonates, the aluminum mixture is dispersed and rapidly burns. The result is a sustained high pressure that is extremely effective against personnel and structures.

=== Soviet, later Russian ===
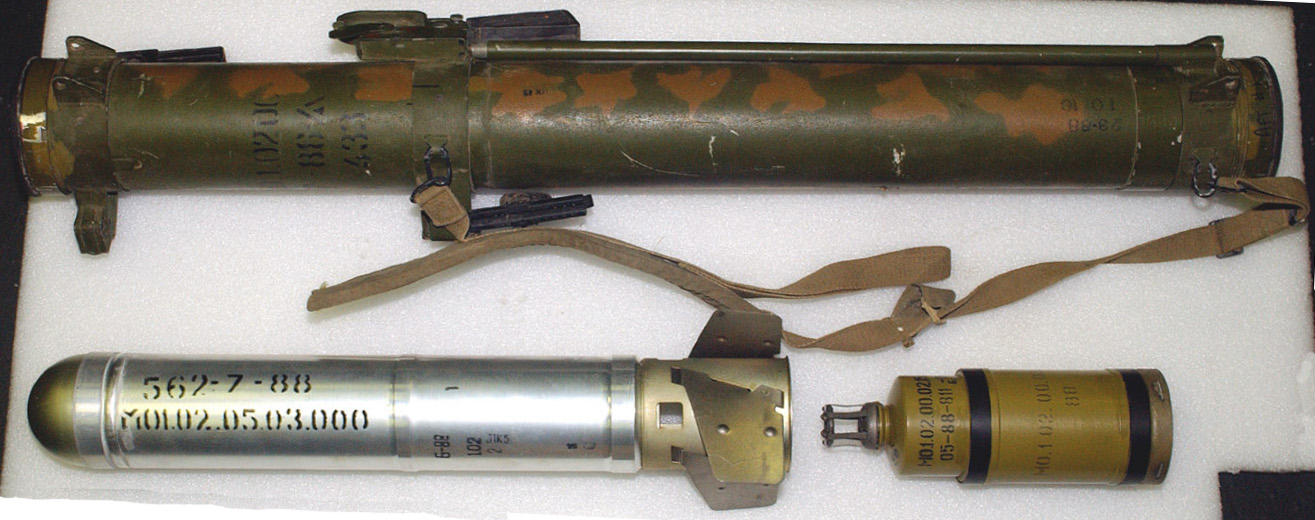
A Soviet RPO-A Shmel (Bumblebee) rocket and launcher

Following FAEs developed by the United States for use in the Vietnam War, Soviet Union scientists quickly developed their own FAE weapons. Since Afghanistan, research and development has continued, and Russian forces have fielded a wide array of third-generation FAE warheads, such as the RPO-A. The Russian armed forces have developed thermobaric ammunition variants for several of their weapons, such as the TBG-7V thermobaric grenade with a lethality radius of 10 m (33 ft), which can be launched from a rocket propelled grenade (RPG) RPG-7. The GM-94 is a 43 mm (1.7 in) pump-action grenade launcher designed mainly to fire thermobaric grenades for close combat. The grenade weighed 250 g (8.8 oz) and contained 160 g (5.6 oz) of explosive, its lethality radius is 3 m (9.8 ft), but due to the deliberate "fragmentation-free" design of the grenade, a distance of 4 m (13 ft) is considered safe.

The RPO-A and upgraded RPO-M are infantry-portable rocket propelled grenades designed to fire thermobaric rockets. The RPO-M, for instance, has a thermobaric warhead with a TNT equivalence of 5.5 kg (12 lb) and destructive capabilities similar to a 152 mm (6 in) high-explosive fragmentation artillery shell. The RShG-1 and the RShG-2 are thermobaric variants of the RPG-27 and RPG-26 respectively. The RShG-1 is the more powerful variant, with its warhead having a 10-metre (33 ft) lethality radius and producing about the same effect as 6 kg (13 lb) of TNT. The RMG is a further derivative of the RPG-26 that uses a tandem-charge warhead, with the precursor high-explosive anti-tank (HEAT) warhead blasting an opening for the main thermobaric charge to enter and detonate inside. The RMG's precursor HEAT warhead can penetrate 300 millimetres (12 in) of reinforced concrete or more than 100 millimetres (3.9 in) of rolled homogeneous armour, thus allowing the 105 mm (4.1 in)-diameter thermobaric warhead to detonate inside.

Other examples include the semi-automatic command to line of sight (SACLOS) or millimeter-wave active radar homing guided thermobaric variants of the 9M123 Khrizantema, the 9M133F-1 thermobaric warhead variant of the 9M133 Kornet, and the 9M131F thermobaric warhead variant of the 9K115-2 Metis-M, all of which are anti-tank missiles. The Kornet has since been upgraded to the Kornet-EM, and its thermobaric variant has a maximum range of 10 km (6 mi) and has a TNT equivalence of 7 kg (15 lb). The 300 mm (12 in) 9M55S thermobaric cluster warhead rocket was built to be fired from the BM-30 Smerch MLRS. A dedicated carrier of thermobaric weapons is the purpose-built TOS-1, a 24-tube MLRS designed to fire 220 mm (8.7 in) thermobaric rockets. A full salvo from the TOS-1 will cover a rectangle 200 by 400 m (220 by 440 yd). The Iskander-M theatre ballistic missile can also carry a 700 kg (1,540 lb) thermobaric warhead.

Many Russian Air Force munitions have thermobaric variants. The 80 mm (3.1 in) S-8 rocket has the S-8DM and S-8DF thermobaric variants. The S-8's 122 mm (4.8 in) brother, the S-13, has the S-13D and S-13DF thermobaric variants. The S-13DF's warhead weighs only 32 kg (71 lb), but its power is equivalent to 40 kg (88 lb) of TNT. The KAB-500-OD variant of the KAB-500KR has a 250 kg (550 lb) thermobaric warhead. The ODAB-500PM and ODAB-500PMV unguided bombs carry a 190 kg (420 lb) fuel–air explosive each. ODAB-1500 is a larger version of the bomb. The KAB-1500S GLONASS/GPS guided 1,500 kg (3,300 lb) bomb also has a thermobaric variant. Its fireball will cover a 150 m (490 ft) radius and its lethal zone is a 500 m (1,600 ft) radius. The 9M120 Ataka-V and the 9K114 Shturm ATGMs both have thermobaric variants.

In September 2007, Russia exploded the largest thermobaric weapon ever made and claimed that its yield was equivalent to that of a nuclear weapon. Russia named this particular ordnance the "Father of All Bombs" in response to the American-developed Massive Ordnance Air Blast bomb (MOAB) bomb, which has the backronym "Mother of All Bombs" and once held the title of the most powerful non-nuclear weapon in history, with a yield equivalent to 44 tonnes of TNT (180 GJ), quadruple that of the American MOAB.

=== Spain ===
A first possible thermobaric weapon, the tóspiro, was invented and tested in 1905 by Spanish inventor Antonio Meulener, who reportedly ordered the project to be closed "for the danger it posed to humanity". In 1983, a program of military research was launched with collaboration between the Spanish Ministry of Defence (Directorate General of Armament and Material, DGAM) and Explosivos Alaveses (EXPAL) which was a subsidiary of Unión Explosivos Río Tinto (ERT). The goal of the program was to develop a thermobaric bomb, the BEAC (Bomba Explosiva de Aire-Combustible). A prototype was tested successfully in a foreign location out of safety and confidentiality concerns. The Spanish Air and Space Force has an undetermined number of BEACs in its inventory.

=== China ===
In 1996, the People's Liberation Army (PLA) began development of the PF-97, a portable thermobaric rocket launcher, based on the Soviet RPO-A Shmel. Introduced in 2000 it is reported to weigh 3.5 kilograms (7.7 lb) and contains 2.1 kilograms (4.6 lb) of thermobaric filler. An improved version called the PF-97A was introduced in 2008.

China is reported to have other thermobaric weapons, including bombs, grenades and rockets.

=== Brazil ===
In 2004, under the request of the Estado Maior da Aeronáutica (Military Staff of Aeronautics) and the Diretoria de Material Aeronáutico e Bélico (Board of Aeronautical and Military Equipment) the Instituto de Aeronautica e Espaço (Institute of Aeronautics and Space) started developing a thermobaric bomb called Trocano.

Trocano is a thermobaric weapon similar in design to the United States' GBU-43/B MOAB weapon or Russia's FOAB. Like the US weapon, the Trocano was designed to be pallet-loaded into a C-130 Hercules aircraft, and deployed using a parachute to drag it from the C-130's cargo bay and separate the bomb from its pallet.

=== United Kingdom ===
In 2009, the British Ministry of Defence (MoD) acknowledged that Army Air Corps (AAC) AgustaWestland Apaches had used AGM-114 Hellfire missiles purchased from the United States against Taliban forces in Afghanistan. The MoD stated that 20 missiles, described as "blast fragmentation warheads", were used in 2008 and a further 20 in 2009. MoD officials told Guardian journalist Richard Norton-Taylor that the missiles were "particularly designed to take down structures and kill everyone in the buildings", as AAC AgustaWestland Apaches were previously equipped with weapon systems deemed ineffective to combat the Taliban. The MoD also stated that "British pilots' rules of engagement were strict and everything a pilot sees from the cockpit is recorded."

In 2018, the MoD accidentally divulged the details of General Atomics MQ-9 Reapers utilized by the Royal Air Force (RAF) during the Syrian civil war, which revealed that the drones were equipped with AGM-114 Hellfire missiles. The MoD had sent a report to a British publication, Drone Wars, in response to a freedom of information request. In the report, it was stated that AGM-114N Hellfire missiles which contained a thermobaric warhead were used by RAF attack drones in Syria.

=== India ===
Based on the high-explosive squash head (HESH) round, a 120 millimetres (4.7 in) thermobaric round was developed in the 2010s by the Indian Ministry of Defence. This HESH round packs thermobaric explosives into the tank shells to increase the effectiveness against enemy bunkers and light armoured vehicles.

The design and the development of the round was taken up by Armament Research and Development Establishment (ARDE). The rounds were designed for the Arjun MBT. The TB rounds contains fuel rich explosive composition called thermobaric explosive. As the name implies, the shells, when they hit a target, produce blast overpressure and heat energy for hundreds of milliseconds. The overpressure and heat causes damage to enemy fortified structures like bunkers and buildings and for soft targets like enemy personnel and light armored vehicles.

=== Serbia ===
The company Balkan Novoteh, formed in 2011, provides the Thermobaric hand grenade TG-1 to the market.

Military Technical Institute in Belgrade has developed a technology for producing cast-cured thermobaric PBX explosives. Since recently, the Factory of Explosives and Pyrotechnics TRAYAL Corporation has been producing cast-cured thermobaric PBX formulations.

=== Ukraine ===
In 2017 Ukroboronprom's Scientific Research Institute for Chemical Products in conjunction with Artem State Enterprise (aka Artem Holding Company) announced to the market its new product, the RGT-27S. These can be combined with the RPV-16 grenade launcher, a demonstration of which was witnessed by Oleksandr Turchynov. The grenades, of approximately 600 grams, "create a two second fire cloud with a volume of not less than 13 m³, inside of which the temperature reaches 2,500 degrees. This temperature allows not only for the destruction of the enemy, but are also able to disable lightly armored vehicles." The firm showed them at the Azerbaijan International Defense Exhibition in 2018.

In 2024, Ukraine started using drones rigged with thermobaric explosives to strike Russian positions in the Russo-Ukrainian War.

== History ==
=== Attempted prohibitions ===
Mexico, Switzerland and Sweden presented a joint motion in 1980 to the United Nations to prohibit the use of thermobaric weapons, to no avail.

United Nations Institute for Disarmament Research categorizes these weapons as "enhanced blast weapons" and there was pressure to regulate these around 2010, again to no avail.

=== Military use ===
==== United States ====
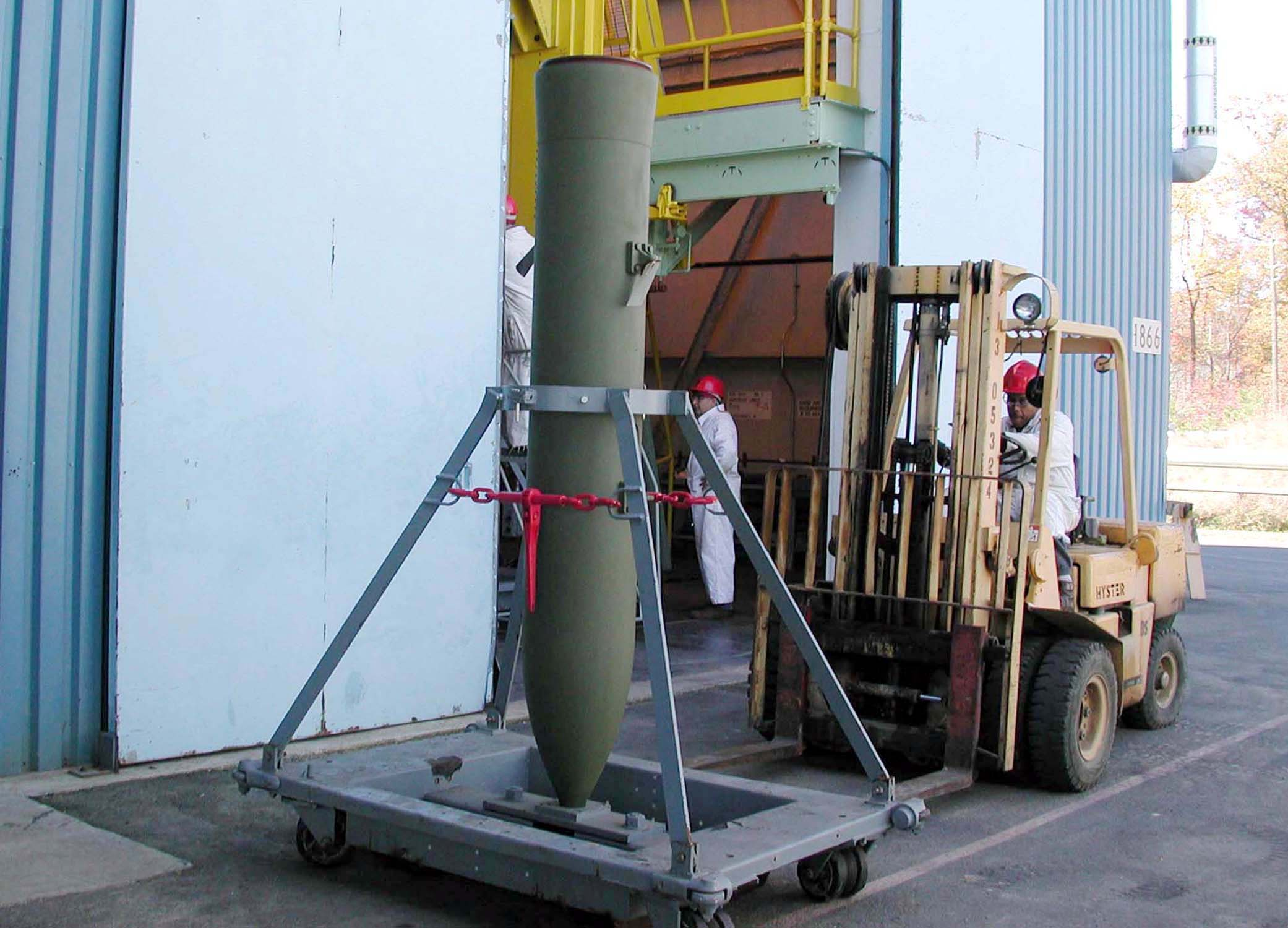
US Navy BLU-118B being prepared for shipping to Afghanistan, 5 March 2002

FAEs such as first-generation CBU-55 fuel–air weapons saw limited use in the Vietnam War. A second generation of FAE weapons were used by the United States in Iraq during the Gulf War, with about 250 CBU-72s dropped by the United States Marine Corps, mostly from A-6Es. Both the CBU-55 and CBU-72 used BLU-73 cluster submunitions, with each loaded with 34 kilograms (75 lb) of ethylene oxide that was dispersed as a vapor and then ignited. Targeted against mine fields and manned trenches, they were less effective as a tool of combat than as psychological warfare.

The US military also used thermobaric weapons in Afghanistan. On 3 March 2002, a single 2,000 lb (910 kg) laser guided thermobaric bomb was used by the United States Air Force against cave complexes in which Al-Qaeda and Taliban fighters had taken refuge in the Gardez region of Afghanistan. The SMAW-NE was used by the US Marines during the First Battle of Fallujah and the Second Battle of Fallujah. The AGM-114N Hellfire II was first used by US forces in 2003 in Iraq.

==== Soviet Union ====
FAEs were reportedly used against China in the 1969 Sino-Soviet border conflict.

The TOS-1 system was test fired in Panjshir Valley during the Soviet–Afghan War in the late 1980s. MiG-27 attack aircraft of the 134th APIB used ODAB-500S/P fuel–air bombs against Mujahideen forces in Afghanistan, but they were found to be unreliable and dangerous to ground crew.

==== Russia ====
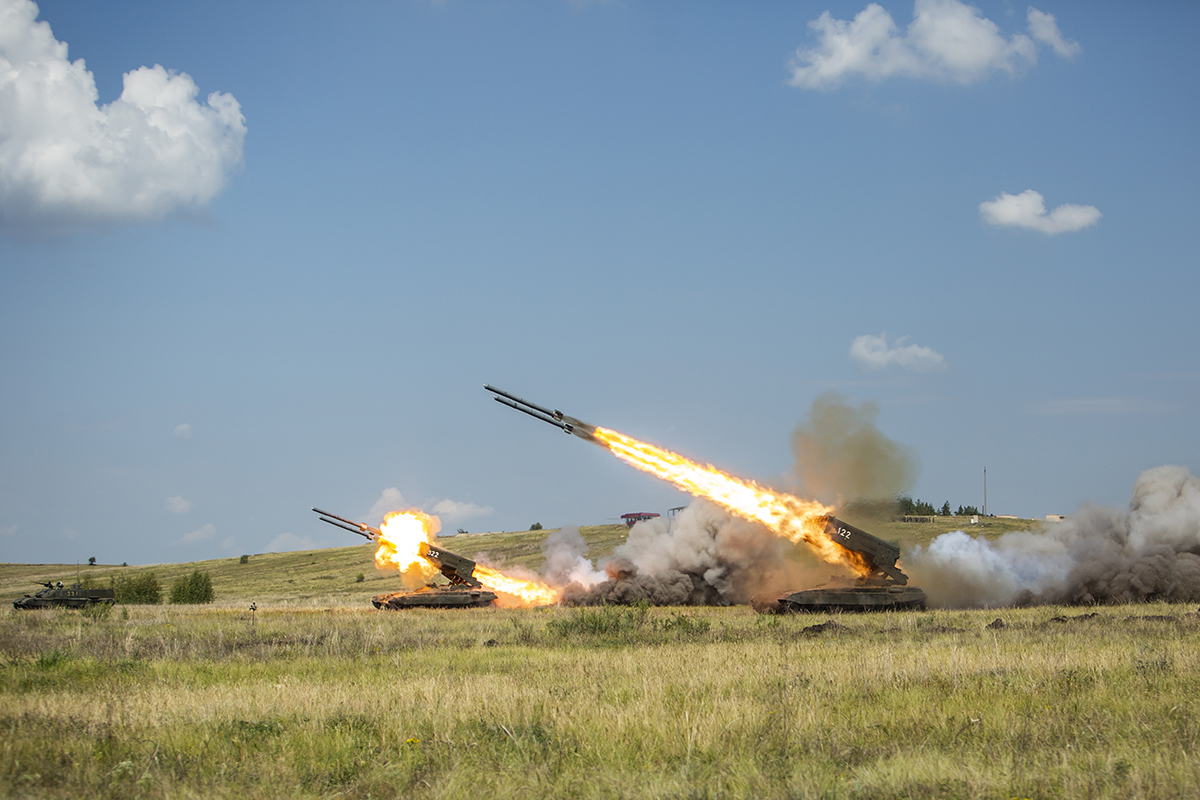
TOS-1A Solntsepyok is a Russian multiple launch rocket system capable of using thermobaric warheads.

Russian military forces reportedly used ground-delivered thermobaric weapons during the Battle for Grozny (first and second Chechen Wars) to attack dug-in Chechen fighters. The use of TOS-1 heavy MLRS and "RPO-A Shmel" shoulder-fired rocket system during the Chechen Wars was reported. Russia used the RPO-A Shmel in the First Battle of Grozny, whereupon it was designated as a very effective round.

It was thought that, during the September 2004 Beslan school hostage crisis, a multitude of handheld thermobaric weapons were used by the Russian Armed Forces in their efforts to retake the school. The RPO-A and either the TGB-7V thermobaric rocket from the RPG-7 or rockets from either the RShG-1 or the RShG-2 is claimed to have been used by the Spetsnaz during the storming of the school. At least three and as many as nine RPO-A casings were later found at the positions of the Spetsnaz. In July 2005 the Russian government admitted to the use of the RPO-A during the crisis.

During the 2022 Russian invasion of Ukraine, CNN reported that Russian forces were moving thermobaric weapons into Ukraine. On 28 February 2022, Ukraine's ambassador to the United States accused Russia of deploying a thermobaric bomb. Russia claimed to have used the weapon in March 2024 against Ukrainian soldiers in an unspecified place (denied by Ukraine), and during the August 2024 Ukrainian incursion into Kursk Oblast.

==== United Kingdom ====
During the War in Afghanistan, British forces, including the Army Air Corps and Royal Air Force, used thermobaric AGM-114N Hellfire missiles against the Taliban. In the Syrian civil war, British military drones used AGM-114N Hellfire missiles; in the first three months of 2018, British drones fired 92 Hellfire missiles in Syria.

==== Syria ====
Reports by the rebel fighters of the Free Syrian Army claimed that the Syrian Air Force used such weapons against residential area targets occupied by the rebel fighters, such as during the Battle of Aleppo and in Kafar Batna. Others contended that in 2012 the Syrian government used an ODAB-500PM bomb in Azaz. A United Nations panel of human rights investigators reported that the Syrian government had used thermobaric bombs against the rebellious town of Al-Qusayr in March 2013.

The Russia and Syrian governments have used thermobaric bombs and other thermobaric munitions during the Syrian civil war against insurgents and insurgent-held civilian areas.

==== Ukraine ====
Mikhail Tolstykh, a top rank pro-Russian officer in the war in Donbas was killed on 8 February 2017 at his office in Donetsk by an RPO-A rocket fired by members of the Security Service of Ukraine. In March 2023 soldiers from the 59th Motorised Brigade of Ukraine showed off the hull of a Russian infantry fighting vehicle destroyed by a thermobaric RGT-27S2 hand grenade delivered by Mavic 3 drone.

==== Non-state actor use ====
Thermobaric and fuel–air explosives have been used in guerrilla warfare since the 1983 Beirut barracks bombing in Lebanon, which used a gas-enhanced explosive mechanism that was probably propane, butane, or acetylene. The explosive used by the bombers in the US 1993 World Trade Center bombing incorporated the FAE principle by using three tanks of bottled hydrogen gas to enhance the blast.

Jemaah Islamiyah bombers used a shock-dispersed solid fuel charge, based on the thermobaric principle, to attack the Sari nightclub during the 2002 Bali bombings in Indonesia.

== International law ==
There is no International law prohibiting the use of thermobaric munitions, fuel-air explosive devices, or vacuum bombs against military targets. As of March 2024, all past attempts to regulate or restrict thermobaric weapons have failed.

Arthur van Collier argued the use of thermobaric weapons in populated areas should be minimized due to their wide-area impact and multiple harm mechanisms.

== See also ==
- Bunker buster
- Flame fougasse
