= SC1800 bomb =

SC 1800
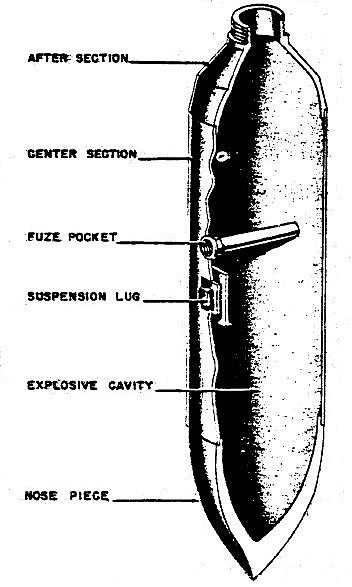
- SC 1800 in cross-section without tail
- Type: General-purpose bomb
- Place of origin: Germany

Service history
- Used by: Luftwaffe
- Wars: World War II

Production history
- Variants: SC 1800; SC 1800B

Specifications
- Mass: 1,800 kg (4,000 lb)
- Length: SC 1800: 3.76 m (12 ft 4 in); SC 1800B: 3.48 m (11 ft 5 in)
- Diameter: 660 mm (26 in)
- Warhead: Amatol; Trotyl; Trialen

The SC 1800 Satan (Sprengbombe Cylindrisch 1800) was a general-purpose bomb used by the German Luftwaffe during World War II.

== Design ==
The SC 1800 had a single piece forged and machined steel body and was similar in construction to the preceding SC 1000 and SC 1200 bombs. The bomb was usually filled with a mixture of 40% amatol and 60% Trotyl, but when used as an anti-shipping bomb it was filled with Trialen 105 (a mixture of 15% hexogen, 70% Trotyl and 15% aluminium powder) and stenciled with the markings "105" and "Bei Abwurf auf Land nicht im Tiefangriff und nur o. V." (which translates to "When above land: do not divebomb and do not use a delayed fuze").

The SC 1800 had a single transverse fuze in contrast to the central fuze of the SC 1200. The SC 1800 tail assembly consisted of four diagonally braced tail fins made of sheet steel, while the SC 1800B had a circular braced tail ring of the same. Inside the bomb casing was a reinforced H-type suspension lug; it could be horizontally suspended in a bomb bay or horizontally mounted on a fuselage hardpoint.
