= Sprengbombe-Cylindrisch bomb =

Sprengbombe-Cylindrisch bomb may refer to:

- SC2500 bomb, (Sprengbombe Cylindrisch 2500) explosive device built by Germany during World War II.
- SC2000 bomb, (Sprengbombe Cylindrisch 2000) explosive device built by Germany during World War II.
- SC1800 bomb, (Sprengbombe Cylindrisch 1800) explosive device built by Germany during World War II.
- SC1200 bomb, (Sprengbombe Cylindrisch 1200) explosive device built by Germany during World War II.
- SC1000 bomb, (Sprengbombe Cylindrisch 1000) explosive device built by Germany during World War II.
- SC500 bomb, (Sprengbombe Cylindrisch 500) explosive device built by Germany during World War II.
- SC250 bomb, (Sprengbombe Cylindrisch 250) explosive device built by Germany during World War II.
- SC50 bomb, (Sprengbombe Cylindrisch 50) explosive device built by Germany during World War II.
