= Dornier Do 17 =

World War II German light bomber

Do 17
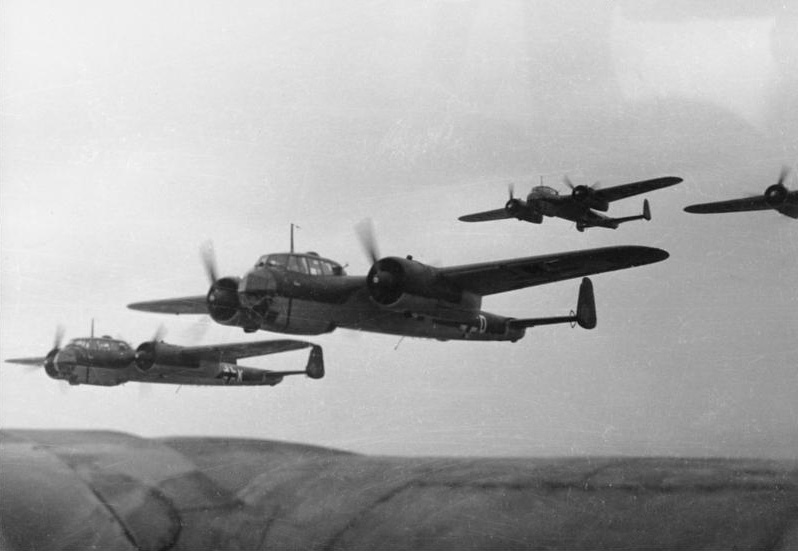

General information
- Type: Light bomber, night fighter and reconnaissance aircraft
- Manufacturer: Dornier Flugzeugwerke
- Primary users: Luftwaffe Royal Yugoslav Air Force; Finnish Air Force; Spanish Air Force
- Number built: 2,139

History
- Introduction date: 1937
- First flight: 23 November 1934
- Retired: 15 September 1952 (Finnish Air Force)
- Variant: Dornier Do 215

The Dornier Do 17 is a twin-engined light bomber designed and produced by the German aircraft manufacturer Dornier Flugzeugwerke. Large numbers were operated by the Luftwaffe throughout the Second World War.

The Do 17 was designed during the early 1930s as a Schnellbomber ("fast bomber") that was intended to use its speed to outrun opposing fighter aircraft. It was a lightly built aircraft, possessing a twin tail, "shoulder wing" and typically powered by a pair of Bramo 323P radial engines. The first prototype made its maiden flight on 23 November 1934, and it entered regular service with the Luftwaffe three years later. Sometimes referred to as the Fliegender Bleistift ("flying pencil") or the Eversharp, the Do 17 was a relatively popular aircraft among its crews due to its handling, especially at low altitude, which made the type harder to hit than other German bombers of the era.

During 1937, the Do 17 made its combat debut during the Spanish Civil War, where it operated as part of the Condor Legion in various roles. Along with the Heinkel He 111, it was the main bomber type of the Luftwaffe at the start of the Second World War. The Do 17 was used extensively throughout the first half of the conflict, seeing action in significant numbers in every major campaign theatre as a front line aircraft. As such, it was deployed during the Polish Campaign, the Norwegian campaign, the Battle of France, the Battle of Britain, and Operation Barbarossa amongst others. Its usage continued unabated up until the end of 1941, when its effectiveness and usage was curtailed by its limited bomb load and range capabilities.

Production of the Do 17 ended in mid-1940 in favour of the newer and more powerful Junkers Ju 88. The successor of the Do 17 was the much more powerful Dornier Do 217, which started to appear in quantity during 1942. The type was not withdrawn at this point; instead, the Do 17 continued to serve with the Luftwaffe during the latter years of the conflict in various secondary roles, including as a glider tug, research, and trainer aircraft. A considerable number were transferred to other Axis-aligned nations, including the Finnish Air Force, Bulgarian Air Force and the Spanish Air Force amongst others. Only a few aircraft are known to have survived the war and none are intact as of the twenty-first century.

== Development ==
In 1932, the Ordnance Department (Heereswaffenamt) issued a specification for the construction of a "freight aircraft for German State Railways", and a "high speed mail plane for Deutsche Luft Hansa". Dornier began work on the design on 1 August 1932.

When the Nazis took power in 1933, Hermann Göring became National Commissar for aviation with former Luft Hansa employee Erhard Milch as his deputy, soon forming the Reichsluftfahrtministerium (RLM, Reich Aviation Ministry). The Ministry of Aviation designated the new aircraft Do 17, and on 17 March 1933, just three months after taking office, Milch gave the go ahead for the building of prototypes. At the end of 1933, the Ministry of Aviation issued an order for a "high speed aircraft with double tail," and for a "freight aircraft with special equipment," in other words, a bomber. The original design (the Do 17 V1) configuration in 1932 had sported a single vertical stabilizer, and Dornier continued developing that model. The Do 17 was first demonstrated in mock-up form in April 1933. The "special equipment" was to be fitted later, to disguise its offensive role.

In April 1934, the Dornier works at Friedrichshafen began project "definition." During this month, the defensive armament was designed and the bomb release mechanism details ironed out. Production of these prototypes began on 20 May 1934 and, on 23 November 1934, the Do 17 V1, with a single fin and powered by a pair of BMW VI 7.3 motors, took off on its maiden flight. Testing was delayed by a series of accidents, with V1 being damaged in landing accidents in February and April 1935. The twin-tailed V2 (powered by low-compression BMW VI 6.3 engines) first flew on 18 May 1935 and was evaluated together with the V1 by the Ministry of Aviation at Rechlin in June. During the tests, the single fin proved to be only marginally stable, resulting in the V1 being modified with a twin tail. The aircraft was destroyed in a crash after an engine failure on 21 December 1935. The V3, also fitted with a twin tail, was originally planned to be powered by Hispano-Suiza 12Ybrs engines, but as these were unavailable, it was fitted with BMW VI 7.3 engines like the V1 and flew on 19 September 1935. The V1 prototype remained the only built machine with the single stabilizer.

It is claimed that, unlike the Heinkel He 111 series, whose military use was planned from the start, the Do 17 V1 was contracted as a fast six-passenger mail plane to compete with the smaller Heinkel He 70 monoplane. It has been suggested that it was rejected by Luft Hansa, as the cramped cabin was too uncomfortable for passenger use and the operating costs were too high for a mail plane. According to the story, the three prototypes remained unused in the Dornier factory in Lowental for almost six months, until Flugkapitän Untucht of Luft Hansa came across them. After receiving permission to fly one of the machines, he proceeded to put it through an almost stunt flying routine. After landing, he said that "the machine is as nimble as a fighter, give it more lateral stability and we'll have a high speed bomber!" Untucht's comments prompted Dornier to redesign the tail unit and revived interest in the type.

Dornier was then ordered to produce the V4 prototype. Some sources state this differed from the V3 in that the passenger portholes were removed and the single fin was replaced with two smaller ones. Photographic evidence demonstrates the V3 had twin stabilizers from the start of its construction. The tests of the "twin-tailed" V4, V6 and V7 prototypes were positive and more prototypes like the V8 emerged as the forerunner of the long-range reconnaissance version, while the V9 was tested as a high-speed airliner. The V9 machine was still flying in 1944.

During 1937, the Do 17 made a high-profile public debut in Zürich at the International Military Aircraft Competition. By this time, bomber squadrons of the Luftwaffe were already being equipped with the first two productions models, the Do 17E and F. During 1938, both these versions were flying combat missions in the Spanish Civil War.

== Design ==
The forward fuselage had a conventional stepped cockpit, with a fully glazed nose. Early variants were labelled the "flying pencil" owing to its sleek and continuous "stick-like" lines. As a result of the lessons learned in the Spanish Civil War, the cockpit roof was raised and the lower, or bottom half, of the crew compartment was a typical under-nose gondola or "Bodenlafette" (abbreviated Bola) this inverted-casemate design ventral defensive armament position was common in German medium bombers. The Bola was extended back to the leading edge of the wings where the lower-rear gunners position and upper-rear gunner position were level with each other. As with contemporary German bombers, the crew were concentrated in a compartment.

The cockpit layout consisted of the pilot seat and front gunner in the forward part of the cockpit. The pilot sat on the left side, close up to the Plexiglas windshield. One of the gunners sat on the right seat, which was set further back to provide room for the 7.92 mm (0.312 in) MG 15 machine gun to be traversed in use. The Do 17 usually carried a crew of four: the pilot, a bombardier and two gunners. The bomb-aimer also manned the MG 15 in the nose glazing and Bola-housed rear lower position. The two gunners operated the forward-firing MG 15 installed in the front windshield, the two MGs located in the side windows (one each side) and the rearward firing weapon. The cockpit offered a bright and panoramic view at high altitude. The standard ammunition load was 3,300 rounds of 7.92 mm ammunition in 44 double-drum magazines.

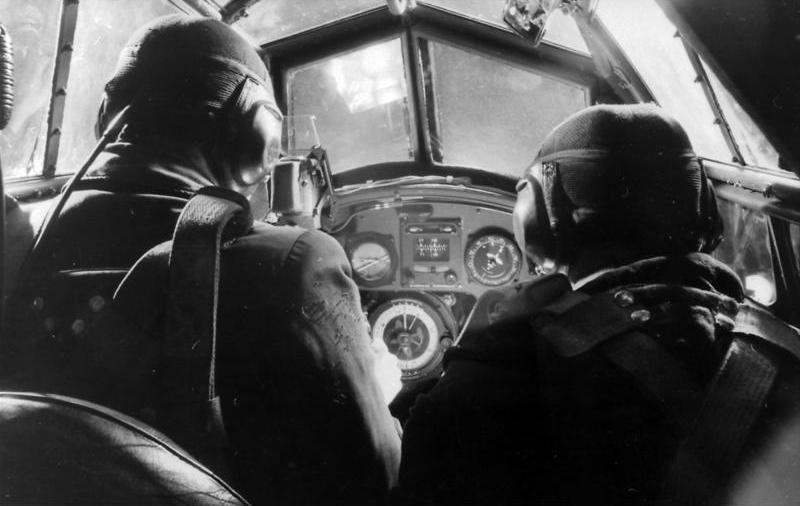
The Do 17 carried one pilot; to his right sat one of two gunners

The wings were of a broad 55 m^{2} (590 ft^{2}) area and had a span of 18 m (59 ft 5/8 in) with a straight leading edge which curved in a near-perfect semicircle into the trailing edge. The positions of the wing roots were offset. The leading edge wing root merged with the top of the fuselage and cockpit. As the wing extended backwards, by roughly two thirds, it declined downwards at a sharp angle so that the trailing edge wing root ended nearly halfway down the side of the fuselage increasing the angle of incidence. This design feature was used on all future Dornier bomber designs, namely the Dornier Do 217. The trailing edge was faired into the round fuselage shape. The engine nacelle was also faired into the flaps. The extreme rear of the nacelle was hollow and allowed the flap with an attached vertical slot to fit into the cavity when deployed.

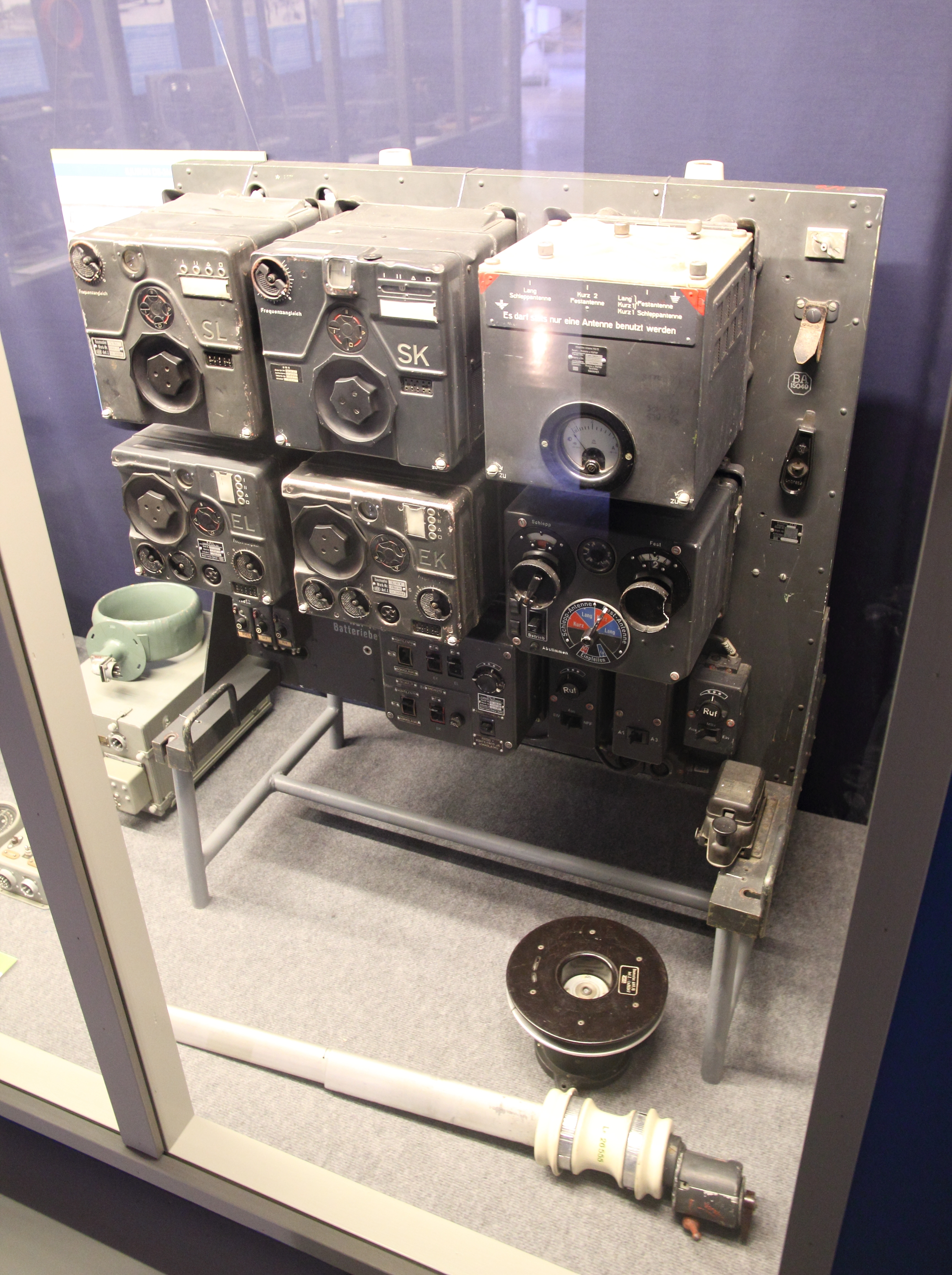
FuG 10 radio set

The fuselage was 15.80 m (51 ft 10 in) long. It was thin and narrow, which presented an enemy with a difficult target to hit. The fuselage had twin vertical stabilizers to increase lateral stability. The power plant of the Z-1 was to have been the Daimler-Benz DB 601 but, owing to shortages from priority allocation for Bf 109E and Bf 110 fighter production, it was allocated Bramo 323 A-1 power plants. The Bramos could only reach 352 km/h (219 mph) at 1,070 m (3,510 ft). The limited performance of the Bramo 323s ensured the Do 17 could not reach 416 km/h (258 mph) at 3,960 m (12,990 ft) in level flight when fully loaded. The range of the Do 17Z-1 at ground level was 635 nmi (1,176 km); this increased to 1,370 km (850 nm) at 4,700 m (15,400 ft). This gave an average attack range of 400 nmi (740 km). The introduction of the Bramo 323P increased the Z-2 performance slightly in all areas.

The Dornier had self-sealing fuel tanks to protect fuel stored in the wings and fuselage. This reduced the loss of fuel and risk of fire when hit in action, and often enabled the aircraft to return. Twenty oxygen bottles were provided for crew use during long flights above 3,660 m (12,010 ft). Communications usually consisted of FuG X, the later FuG 10, navigational direction finder PeilG V direction finder (PeilG - Peilgerät) and the FuG 25 IFF and FuBI 1 blind-landing devices. The crew communicated by EiV intercom. A primitive autopilot device, the Siemens K4Ü, was installed and could maintain bearing using the rudder's control surfaces.

The bomb bay had four bomb racks, the No. 5 for SC50 bombs and two ETC 500 racks to carry heavier loads of up to 500 kg (1,100 lb) each. A Lotfe A, or B bombsight was issued together with the BZA-2 aperture (a modernised optical lens system). The bomb bay allowed two options, one was to carry four 250 kg (550 lb) bombs for a load of 1,000 kg (2,200 lb), which reduced aircraft range. With half the maximum load, ten 50 kg (110 lb) bombs, additional fuel tanks could be placed into the forward part of the bomb bay to increase range. The bomb aimer aimed the bombs via the Lotfe (A, B or C 7/A, depending on the variant) bomb sight which was in the left side of the nose compartment directly under and forward of the pilot. When fully loaded, the Z-1 weighed 7,740 kg (17,060 lb).

== Variants ==
=== Early Daimler-Benz-powered variants ===
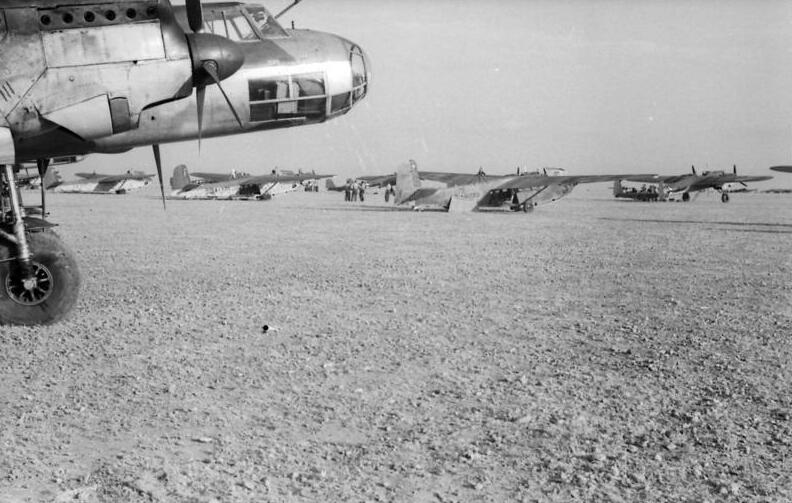
Dornier Do 17E in Sicily with DFS 230 gliders, 1943

The initial production variants were the Do 17E-1 bomber, which was tested with two Daimler-Benz DB 600, and Do 17F-1 reconnaissance aircraft, powered like the early prototypes with BMW VI engines, which entered production in late 1936. The first Luftwaffe units converted to the Do 17 in early 1937.

The Do 17E-1 was equipped with two BMW VI 7.3D inline engines of 750 PS each. The crew numbered three. The radio operator manned the two 7.92 mm MG 15 machine guns within a B-Stand pod in the rear cockpit; they had 750 rounds of ammunition. The bomb bay was divided into two compartments. Each had five bomb racks with individual capacity of 50 kg (110 lb). A single ETC 500/IX bomb rack could be mounted externally underneath the aircraft to carry a 500 kg bomb. A Do 17 E-1 with the designation D-AJUN was tested with an unusual configuration, two SC 500 bombs mounted side by side under the fuselage. (Note: It appears the single rack could carry an unusual weight of at least one heavy 450 kg (990 lb) bomb. In an unusual trial two SC 500s (500 kg), weighing roughly 1,100 lbs each, appear to have been carried by an ETC 500 rack. This would indicate that the "500" figure in the model name of the rack itself, does not denote maximum load capability) It showed a notable performance reduction due to the increase in weight and drag, this configuration was not used operationally. The E-1 continued to carry low bomb loads into the Second World War. The performance of the E-1 enabled it to reach a speed of 330 km/h (210 mph) at 3,000 m (9,800 ft). Conducting a shallow dive the light frame of the Do 17 could reach 500 km/h (310 mph). Its maximum ceiling was 5,500 m (18,000 ft). Several E-1s were rebuilt as E-2 or E-3, at least three E-2 and one E-3 were used by DVL and Hansa-Luftbild GmbH (Hansa Aerial Photography Ltd) in a secret military reconnaissance role prior to the war.

The Do 17F-1 was a long-range reconnaissance aircraft based on field modified Do 17Es. The Do 17 prototype V8 was used to test the configuration of the F-1 and V11 for the F-2. The defensive armament consisted of a MG 15 in the B- and C-Stand (B-Stand - an upper rear firing position, C-Stand — lower gun emplacement). The fuselage had two cameras along with six ejector tubes for flashlight cartridges. The F-1 saw service until replaced by the Do 17 P in 1938. Only one F-2 was ever built, it was designated D-ACZJ and was used by Zeiss-Jena Company as a factory aircraft.

Conversion of two E-2 series aircraft with two BMW 132F radial engines led to the Do 17 J-1 and J-2. These aircraft served as flight testing machines to evaluate the BMW 132 for usage in the Do 17. The aircraft were the V18 (Wrk Nr, or Werknummer meaning works/factory number, 2021) and V19 (Wrk Nr 2022) prototypes. Trials began in late 1937. A similar conversion, but with Bramo 323 radial engines, led to the designation Do 17 L-1 and L-2. Two Do 17 (Wrk Nr 2031 and 2032) were renamed as V20 and V21 prototypes and used to evaluate the Bramo 323 for usage in the Do 17. The test was satisfactory and all future production models were equipped with this engine.

After seeing the Do 17M V1 at the Zürich air races in 1937, the Yugoslav Royal Air Force bought license rights for production at the Drzavna Fabrika Aviona factory in 1938. They equipped it with the more powerful Gnome-Rhône 14 NO radial engine. Dornier designs were delivered to the Pomorsko Vazduhoplovstvo (Naval Aviation - PV) in 1926, namely the Dornier Komet and Dornier Do Y heavy bombers. The Yugoslavs were familiar with Dornier designs, and on 19 November 1935 Yugoslav pilots test-flew the Do 17 V-3 prototype, D-ABIH, W.Nr. 258. They decided to select the Do 17 for service, despite it being more expensive than any other aircraft, because of the German willingness to deliver them quickly without limitations on numbers.

The Do 17L-0 and Do 17M-0 were developed in parallel as replacements for the earlier E and Fs, the L being the reconnaissance version. Both were designed around the more powerful DB 600A engines, delivering about 746 kW (1,000 hp). Two L and one M versions were built as prototypes, both with another MG 15 in the nose. The first prototype of the revised version, the Do 17M V1 (D-ABVD) was powered by two DB 600s, and demonstrated impressive performance, including a maximum speed of 425 km/h (264 mph).

At the International Military Aircraft Competition at Zürich, Switzerland, in 1937, the Dornier Do 17M V1 proved a leader in its class and was faster than the fastest foreign fighter, the French Dewoitine D.510. The Do 17, along with the Messerschmitt Bf 109, won many prizes, demonstrating the prowess of German aviation design.

=== Radial variants ===
Despite its success, owing to shortages in the supply of the Daimler-Benz engine, the production Do 17M was fitted with the Bramo 323 engine, with the corresponding reconnaissance aircraft, the Do 17P, being powered by BMW 132Ns to give better range.

The supply of the DB 600 remained extremely limited as production was soon switched over to the fuel-injected DB 601, which was reserved for the Messerschmitt Bf 109 and Messerschmitt Bf 110 fighters. Therefore, production versions of the basic Do 17M model airframe were fitted with the new Bramo 323A-1 Fafnir engines of 670 kW (900 hp), which gave reasonable performance and raised the bomb load to 1,000 kg (2,200 lb). The resulting Do 17 M-1 was produced in small numbers and operated until 1941.

The prototypes for the M-1 series were Do 17M V1 (Werk Nr 691) and Do 17M V2 (Werk Nr 692) which were tested with bomb loads of a medium bomber. The third prototype, Do 17M V3 was evaluated as a fast bomber. The M V1 was fitted with two Daimler Benz DB 601 inline engines while the M V2 and M V3 had the Bramo 323 A and D respectively. The Ministry of Aviation favoured the widespread use of the DB 601, but demand for the DB 601s in fighter aircraft and the lack of production forced the use of the Bramo.

The Do 17 M-1 started its service as a medium bomber and was able to carry 2,200 lb (1,000 kg) of bombs. It was equipped with two air-cooled Bramo 323 A-1 or A-2. The defensive armament consisted of two, and later three, MG 15 machine guns. The first was operated in an A-Stand pod operated by the navigator through the windshield. The position was allocated 370 rounds of ammunition. The rearward firing B-Stand was operated by the radio operator and allocated 750 rounds. The rear position in the lower fuselage was allocated 375 rounds in a C-Stand pod. The Do 17M could carry a bomb load of either 20 SC50 50 kg (110 lb) or two SC250 250 kg (550 lb) bombs or 10 SC50 and a single SC250 bomb. The speed of the M was superior to that of the E variant. The Do 17M could reach 420 km/h (260 mph) at altitudes of 3,500 m (11,500 ft) and could achieve a maximum service ceiling of 5,790 m (19,000 ft) and a range of 850 nautical miles (1,570 km).

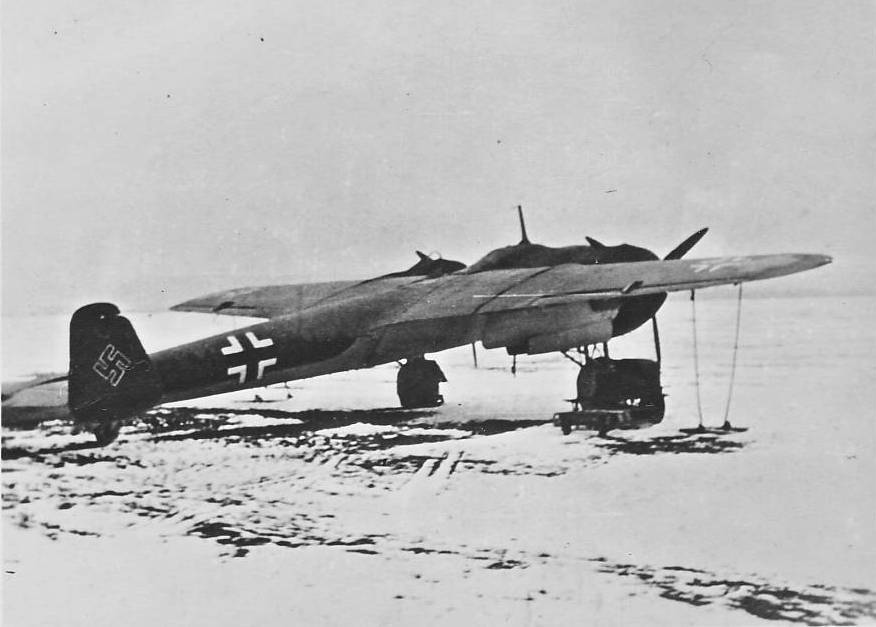
Do 17Z in the Soviet Union, winter 1941–42 showing its sleek, pencil-like, outline

Reconnaissance aircraft based on the M-1, the under-surfaces of the wing were covered with duralumin and it had a wider engine axis and longer engine nacelles. The demand for a reconnaissance aircraft based on the M-1 led to the development of the P-1 variant. The L version would not be able to enter production with the DB 600 owing to its use in the Bf 109, and the Bramo engine was rather thirsty on fuel and left the M models with too short a range for reconnaissance use. BMW 132N radials of 865 PS were selected instead, which had lower fuel consumption for better range. Another two prototypes with DB 600 engines were produced as the Do 17R-0, but did not enter production. During reconnaissance missions the P-1 was armed with four MG 15s in the A, B and C—Stands. One machine gun was located in the rear of the cockpit, another in the lower rear Bola mount, one facing forward through the windscreen and the other in the nose glazing. In earlier variants the B-Stand (the gun position in the upper rear cockpit) was open to the elements, but the P-1 now provided an enclosed bulb-shaped mount protecting the radio operator from the weather.

The P variant had similar features to the Do 17M-1, with added blind flying and camera equipment for reconnaissance work. The Do 17P-1 was powered by two BMW 132N radial engines with a maximum performance of 865 PS (853 hp (636 kW) each. The machine was fitted with several radio variations. The FuG IIIaU radio (Funkgerät), the PeilG V direction finder (PeilG - Peilgerät) and the FuBI 1 radio blind-landing device (FuBI - Funkblindlandegerät). The crew of three communicated with each other via the EiV intercom (EiV -Eigenverständigungsanlage). The P-1 was equipped with either Rb 20/30 and Rb 50/30 or Rb 20/18 and Rb 50/18 cameras. The P-1/trop was fitted with filters and protection for the cameras. The cameras were controlled remotely by the crew from the cockpit.

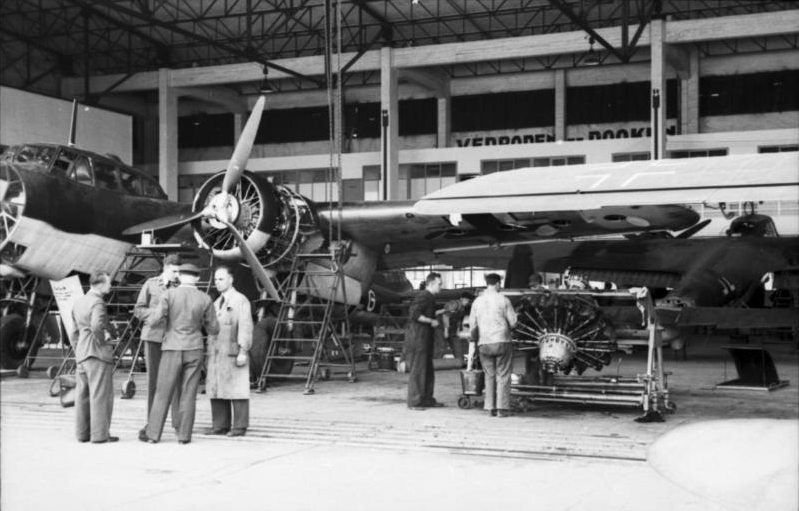
A Bramo 323 radial engine is serviced in front of a D 17

Due to a shortage of night fighters, at least one Do 17P-1 was assigned to this role. A smooth metal sheet was installed in place of its glass nose and it was armed with three 20 mm (0.79 in) MG 151/20 cannons. The machine operated under Luftflotte 1.

The Do 17P-2 was identical to the P-1, with the additional installation of an ETC 500 bomb rack under the fuselage. These aircraft were designed for night reconnaissance. It is assumed that Dornier converted most, if not all, P-2 models from existing P-1 production aircraft.

Unlike the P-2, the Do 17R-1 did not see series production. The experiences of the Spanish Civil War proved that unarmed aircraft were easy prey for fighter aircraft. The R-1 was to be a fast long-range reconnaissance aircraft with two additional fuel cells inside the fuselage aft of the bomb bay. Two variants were suggested, the first (variant I) had a Rb 50/30 and two Rb 20/30 cameras, while variant II had a third fuel cell to replace the rear Rb 20/30. The aircraft had a gross weight of 7,250 kg (15,980 lb) but could be overloaded to 7,500 kg (16,500 lb) in emergencies. The crew usually numbered three, but a fourth was added depending on the missions to be flown. To achieve a high performance at increased altitudes two DB 600 Gs were to be used. The power plants were tested in the Do 17R V1 prototype registered D-ABEE. The second, the R V2, registered D-ATJU, received the even more powerful DB 601 Aa engines. The power plant of the R-1s that did exist is not known.

The lessons from the Spanish Civil War had led Dornier's designers to incorporate more defensive machine guns. Battles with Soviet-built fighter aircraft had demonstrated that the Dornier was not as fast and invulnerable as was first thought. To cope with this, a completely new pod-like cockpit was designed to give the crew more room and better visibility. The roof was extended upward over the line of the fuselage, sloping down to meet it just in front of the wing. The dorsal gun was moved to the rear of the pod where it had a considerably better field of fire. The floor was dropped under the fuselage as a Bola casemate-style defensive armament emplacement, and the ventral gun moved to the back of the Bola, allowing it to fire directly to the rear. The changes in the roof and floor made the front of the aircraft much larger and the rest of the airframe remained the same. The new cockpit design was nicknamed Kampfkopf (German: "battle head").

Three S variant prototypes with the DB 600 G inline engines were tested. The S-01 (designation D-AFFY), 03 and 04 were flown. The inverted V-12 engines were constructed as the Do 17 S-0 reconnaissance version, but it did not go into production. An additional 15 Do 17 U-1 pathfinder models were built, similar to the S-0 but adding another crewman (taking the total to five) to operate the extra radio equipment. The U models were to fly ahead of other bombers on night missions, using the radio equipment to locate the target and drop flares on it. They were personally requested by KG 100 as experimental models for this role. The U-1 had a maximum speed of 265 mph (426 km/h) and a combat ceiling of 4,500 m (14,800 ft). The U-1 had a cruising speed of 384 km/h (239 mph) and a maximum reachable height of 5,700 m (18,700 ft), owing to the "rather low performance of the Bramo 323 A-1 engines". The three prototypes (U-01 - U-03) and twelve production aircraft were built by 1938.

=== Dornier Do 17Z: The main variant ===
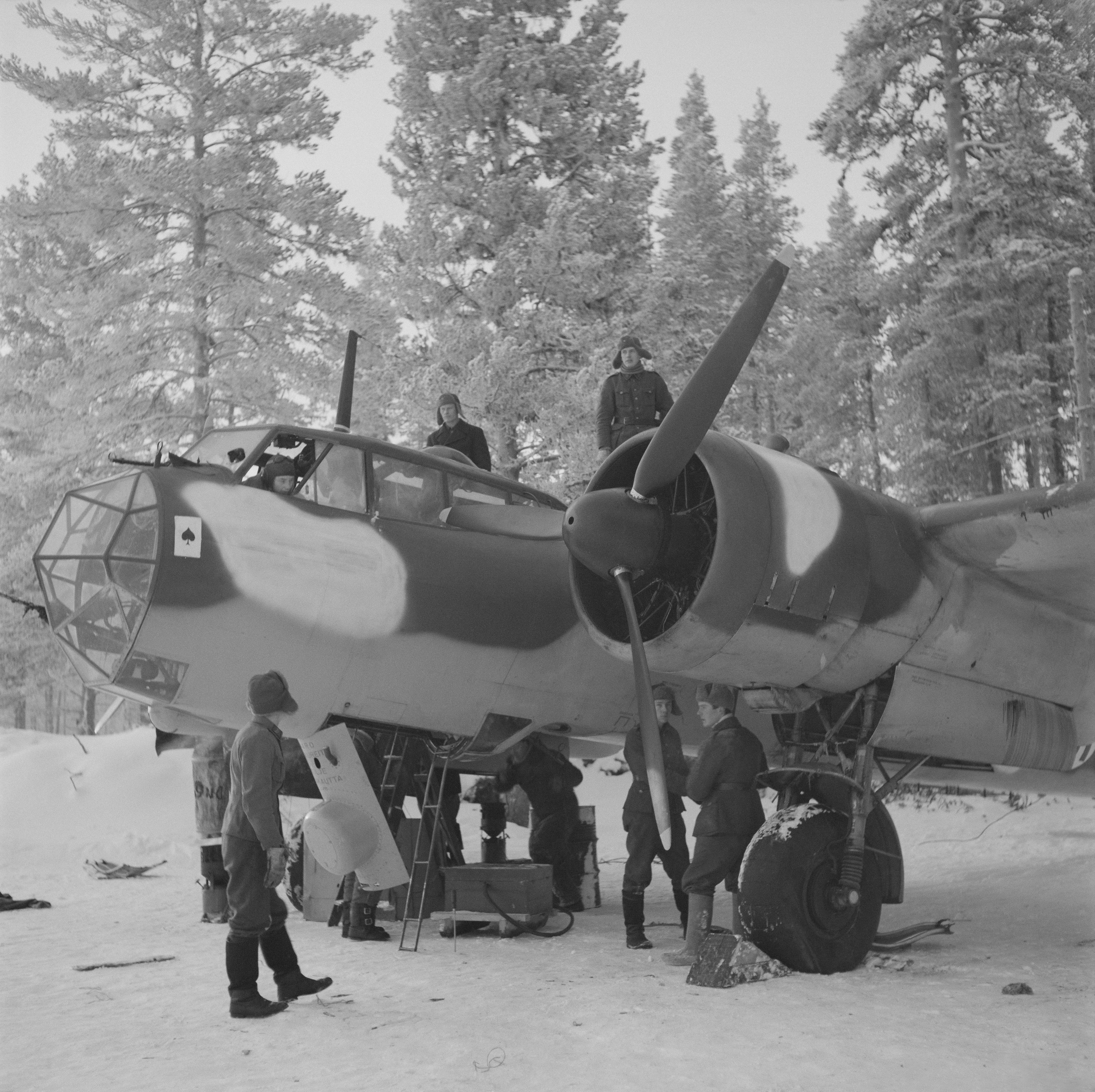
Do 17Z of the Finnish Air Force, January 1942

The Dornier Do 17Z series was the most recognised and mass-produced variant, and saw more combat service than the E-U types. The type was modified as a result of combat experience during the Spanish Civil War. The forward fuselage was redesigned, with the cockpit area being "dropped", or extended further to enable a rear firing gunner position to be installed, and the canopy extended aft, until it was nearly parallel with the leading edge and wing root.

To test the design, the Do 17S and Do 17U were produced, both to be powered by the DB 600 power plants. However, a call for all DB 600 series engines to be reserved for fighters led to the variants being fitted with Bramo Fafnir 323 A radial engines. The bomb load was increased to 1,000 kg (2,200 lb) and a fourth crew member was added. It proved to be underpowered, so Bramo 323 P engines were then fitted. Only three Do 17S and 15 Do 17Us were built. With the updates, the Dornier, with a full bomb load, had a combat radius of 322 km (200 mi). Later variants, in the Do 17Z-3, Z-4 and Z-5, which were fitted with cameras, dual trainer controls and flotation aids (for maritime operations) respectively, still could not solve the problems with range and bomb load.

At first, a batch of Z-0s were built with the Fafnir for testing, the DB 600 again proving to be too hard to obtain. These were quickly replaced with the Z-1 model, which added another gun for the bombardier, but the additional weight of the nose and guns meant the bomb load was reduced to 500 kg (1,100 lb). The Luftwaffe, not being satisfied with the test outcome of the Z series, immediately ordered performance and design studies to increase the overall performance of the bomber. These resulted in very optimistic speeds and altitudes for all future Z variants, especially for the Z-5 aircraft. Planned performance altitudes of up to 7,620 m (25,000 ft) at a maximum speed of 418 km/h (260 mph) with an aircraft weight of 8,100 kg (17,900 lb) were planned. Production aircraft never reached these optimistic performances during the service career of the Do 17Z. At 7,740 kg (17,060 lb), the heavy Do 17Z-1 used two Bramo 323 A-1 engines with self-sealing fuel cells in the fuselage and wings. The crew of four consumed approximately 20 bottles of oxygen during long flights above 3,700 m (12,100 ft). The Do 17Z-1 had a speed of 352 km/h (219 mph) at 1,100 m (3,600 ft). However, the performance of the Bramo 323s did not permit the Do 17 to reach 416 km/h (258 mph) at 3,900 m (12,800 ft) and level flight when fully loaded. Range of the Z-1 at ground level was 635 nmi (1,176 km) while at 4,700 m (15,400 ft) this increased to 850 nmi (1,570 km). This gave an average range of 400 nmi (740 km). The introduction of the Bramo 323P increased subsequent performance in the following sub variants.

This was addressed in the major production model, the Do 17Z-2. The Z-2 mounted the new 323P-1 version of the Fafnir with 746 kW (1,000 hp), which was specifically tuned to the performance needs of the Do 17 by decreasing supercharger power at lower altitudes and thus improving low-level performance. The increase in takeoff power allowed the bomb load to be increased from 500 to 1,000 kg (1,100 to 2,200 lb). However the combat range with a full 1,000 kg (2,200 lb) bomb load was a very short 330 km (210 mi). The armament was further upgraded by adding another pair of guns firing out of the sides of the upper part of the pod, but as the three guns were all fired by a single gunner, only one of them could be fired at a time. From May 1940, 422 Do 17Z-2s flew with Kampfgeschwader 2 Holzhammer (Wooden mallet), Kampfgeschwader 3 Blitz (Lightning), Kampfgeschwader 76 and Kampfgeschwader 77". The upgrades of the Z-2 had its overall weight increased from 17,600 to 17,920 lb (7,980 to 8,130 kg). After heavy losses of Do 17s during the Battle of Britain it was decided to replace the MG FF cannon with the more powerful MG 151/15. Losses had mounted in spite of an increase of up to eight machine guns in some Dorniers.

The Z-3 formed part of the bomber versions of the Z series, it was, however, also used as a reconnaissance aircraft by the staff flight of the particular unit. The engines and the general equipment were identical to the Z-2 standard; however two cameras — the Rb 50/30 and Rb 20/30 - were incorporated into the crew entry hatch. A handheld camera was issued to the crew to validate the success during bombing missions. Autopilot equipment was added later. The Z-2 and Z-3 were identical visually, and could only be distinguished from each other by the altered crew hatch on the Z-3. Owing to spacing problems because of the added camera equipment, the ammunition supply was reduced from 44 to 42 magazines. The power plant of the Z-3 was upgraded to the Bramo 323P-2. The Bramo P-2 remained the engine of all the remaining Z series variants.

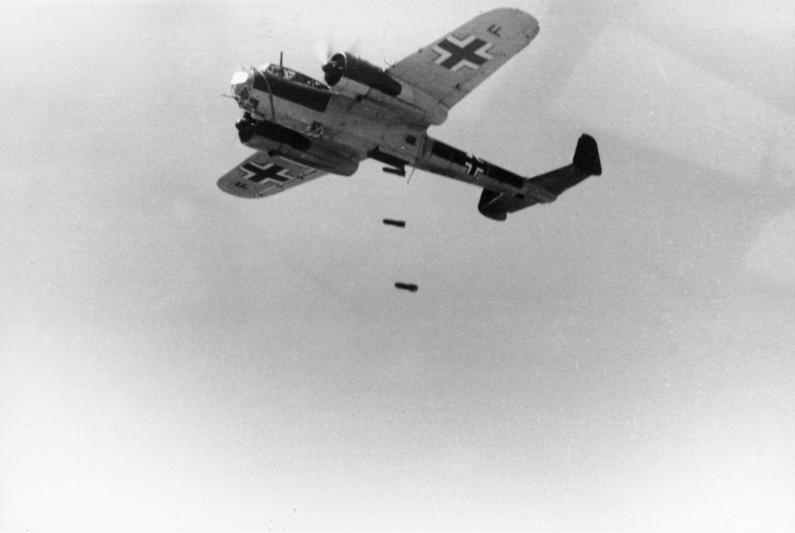
The Do 17 could carry an internal 1,000 kg (2,205 lb) bomb load, either 20 × 50 kg (110 lb) or 4 × 250 kg (551 lb) bombs

The Z-4 was designed as trainer. Although nearly identical to the Z-2 and Z-3, it featured several equipment changes optimised for blind flying training. The four-seat aircraft had a single control column with dual steering, which was achieved by a jib protruding to the right. Rudder pedals were in front of both seats. The defensive armament and bomb racks were reduced, or in most cases omitted to reduce weight. The Z-5 was similar to the Z-3 with a weight of 19,000 lb (8,600 kg). Designed as an anti-shipping aircraft, the Z-5, was fitted with flotation cells in the fuselage and engine nacelles in case it was forced down on water. Usually the flotation devices took the form of inflatable bags stored in the rear of the engine nacelles and in bulges on either side of the nose, just behind the front glazing.

Later variants of the Z model were developed. The Z-6 was to be a reconnaissance aircraft, although it was only built as a prototype. During the war only a few were converted from existing combat variants. The type was selected for weather check flights. It was identical to the Z-1/Z-2 variants, but offensive armament was omitted and extra fuel cells fitted. This increased the fuel load to 2,890 L (578 imperial gallons). As flights required higher altitude, the oxygen supply was increased from 20 to 24 bottles. For long-range flights over water, the larger dinghy of the Z-5 with its updated emergency escape equipment was mandatory during operations. The Z-6s were also used for night fighter operations. Some of the few converted Z-6s had the Ju 88C-6 nose installed and were equipped with machine guns and cannons. The nose proved to be unsatisfactory, and it was redesigned. In the tip of the new nose was an infrared spotlight which was soon made redundant after the introduction of Lichtenstein radar which was fitted to some of the Z-6.

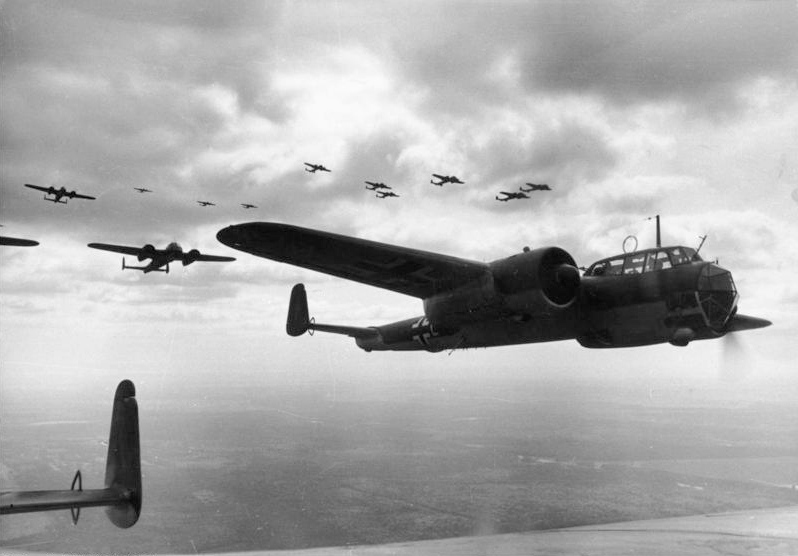
Do 17Z-2s over France, summer 1940

The Z-8 Geier (Vulture) was not produced. It was intended as a ground attack aircraft and reached the first planning phase but was given up due to lack of performance and protective armour. An increase in armour would have meant a decrease in speed which would have exposed the aircraft further to enemy fire. The Z-9, which was fitted with special bomb release equipment, and delayed release gear for low-level attack missions. Its purpose was to suppress enemy air defences. Therefore, it was designed to fly over anti-aircraft positions and drop Butterfly Bombs, an early form of cluster bomb munitions. This could only be done with air superiority, as the Z-9 was unarmoured. The airframe and equipment was identical to the Z-1/Z-2 version. Only the bomb bay was altered to accommodate 16 bomb-dispenser systems. The maximum weight of the Z-9 was 7,800 kg (17,200 lb). The design did not reach serial production.

After bomber production ended in 1940, the Z model was modified with a "solid" nose from the Ju 88C, fitted with one 20 mm MG FF cannon and three 7.92 mm (.312 in) MG 17 machine guns, to be used as night fighters. Three prototypes were converted from Z-series airframes to the Do 17Z-7 Kauz I ("screech-owl") configuration. The standard Z-7 was fitted with Bramo 323P-1 radial engines and had a crew of three. In comparison to the standard bomber version, the fuel load arrangement was altered by subdividing into cells. Two cells were in the wings, with a capacity of 770 litres (154 imperial gallons) each. A third cell was placed in the bomb bay within the main fuselage, having a capacity of 895 litres (179 imperial gallons). The oxygen supply for the crew was reduced to nine bottles, as intercepts at high altitudes were not anticipated. Add-on armour in the form of heavy steel plates was bolted to the nose bulkhead to protect the crew against frontal fire. It was planned to completely armour the crew compartment. This idea was given up again as the increased weight would have reduced flight performance of an already slow aircraft. The ammunition loads for the three 7.92 mm MG 17s amounted to 3,000 rounds and 400 rounds of ammunition for the 20 mm MG 151 cannon (although some Do 17Z bombers carried a 20 mm for ground attack missions).

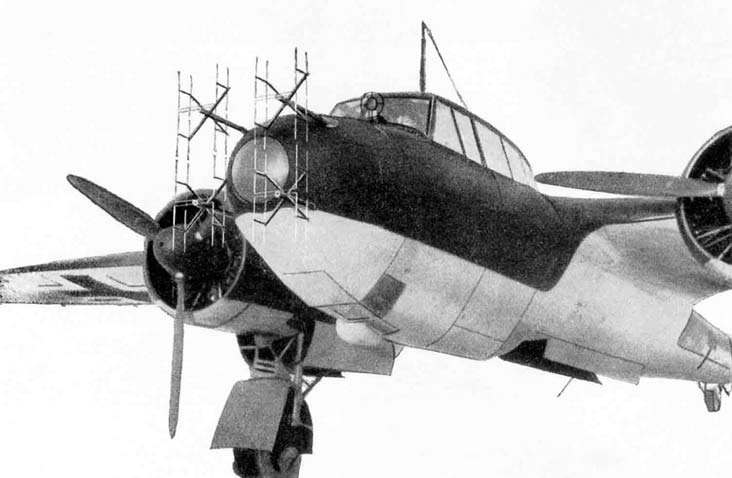
Dornier Do 17Z-10 night fighter with FuG 202 Lichtenstein B/C UHF radar

Later, the design was further modified to the Do 17Z-10 Kauz II, the solid nose now containing an infrared searchlight for the Spanner Anlage infrared detection system. The infrared lamp in the nose was used to illuminate the target while the display unit in the windshield made the reflection visible to the pilot. The Z-10 was armed with four 7.92 mm (.312 in) MG 17 machine guns grouped above the IR light and two 20 mm MG FF in the lower nose. The crew could reload the 20 mm cannon drum magazines internally. The Z-10 contained an IR searchlight (Spanner-Anlage) for the Spanner infrared detection system. A single Kauz II was equipped with and tested the Lichtenstein radar.

Only 10 of these Kauz II designs were converted from Z-series airframes. The Spanner system proved to be essentially useless and many Z-10 were left without any detection system. At least one Z-10, coded CD+PV, was used as a flying test bed to help developing the early low-UHF band B/C version of the Lichtenstein radar system in late 1941–1942. (Note: A photograph identifying a Z-10 with the system above the fuselage can be seen at the Luftwaffe test centre at Rechlin, (picture undated).) When the Z-10 was stripped of all non-night fighter equipment, it had a maximum weight of 7,300 kg (16,100 lb). Armament fit was similar to that of the Z-7, with an added MG 17 and an additional 1,000 rounds of ammunition in the nose section. Defensive gun positions included the B and C stand, each equipped with a MG 15.

== Production ==
=== German ===
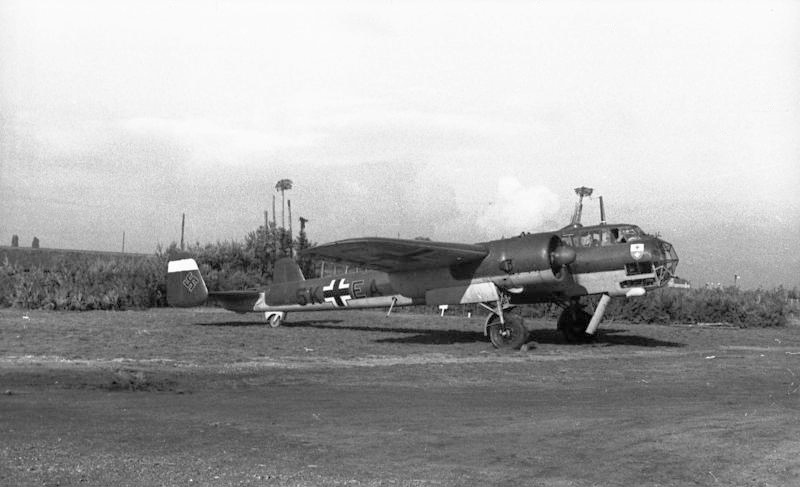
The Do 17Z was the most produced variant of the Do 17 series

Official figures state 2,139 Do 17s were built on German assembly lines. At the Dornier factory at Oberpfaffenhofen, 328 Do 17Es were built along with a further 77 Do 17Fs and 200 Do 17M variants. Do 17Z production figures for Oberpfaffenhofen stand at 420. At Friedrichshafen, 84 Do 17Ks were built, some of which were sold to the Yugoslav Royal Air Force. Do 17P production was spread out over different factory lines. At Siebel/Halle, eight were built. At the Henschel factory at Berlin-Schönefeld 73 were constructed. At the HFB plant in Hamburg 149 were built. Henschel also produced some 320 Do 17Zs, HFB contributed to construction of 74 at its Hamburg plant, and another 73 were built at Siebel. It was the interest shown by Yugoslavia in the Do 17Z which gave rise to the designation Dornier Do 215, allotted for no apparent reason to the Do 17Z sent to Yugoslavia for demonstration purposes. Some 105 examples of the Dornier Do 215B was later built at Oberpfaffenhofen.

By 19 September 1938, the Luftwaffe had received 579 Dornier Do 17s. These were mostly Do 17E, F, M and P variants. During 1939–1940, some 475 Dornier Do 17Z bombers, 16 reconnaissance aircraft and nine night fighters were built. Another 100 Dornier Do 215s, an updated variant of the Do 17, were built during this period also.

=== Yugoslav ===
Other governments were interested in the Do 17. In June 1936, the Yugoslav government ordered 36 Do 17E variants from Germany. The negotiations for a licence were completed on 27 June 1938 for 36 Do 17Ka's at the cost of 1,829,825 Reichsmarks. On 18 March 1938, Yugoslavia ordered 16 complete Do 17 Ka-2's and Ka-3's at a cost of 3,316,788 Reichsmarks. They received the last on 21 April 1939. The machines were from 72 to 96% complete.

The Dorniers were devoid of German equipment, including engines. The Yugoslavs found a French manufacturer to supply the powerplants instead. Gnome et Rhône was the supplier chosen, and the Gnome-Rhône Mistral Major engine was to be used in the Dornier. The French had inflated the performance data of the engine, claiming it to have 649 kW (870 hp) and a speed of 420 km/h (260 mph) at 3,850 m (12,630 ft). The constant-speed propellers were also poor, and delivered late. This led to trials with Piaggio Aero and Ratier propellers. Only one of the Do 17s delivered was fitted out complete with German equipment. The rest of the Dorniers were equipped with Belgian FN 7.9 mm (.31 in) machine guns, Czech camera equipment and eventually Telefunken radio sets. Altogether, 70 Do 17s were produced by Yugoslav factories.

== Operators and operational history ==
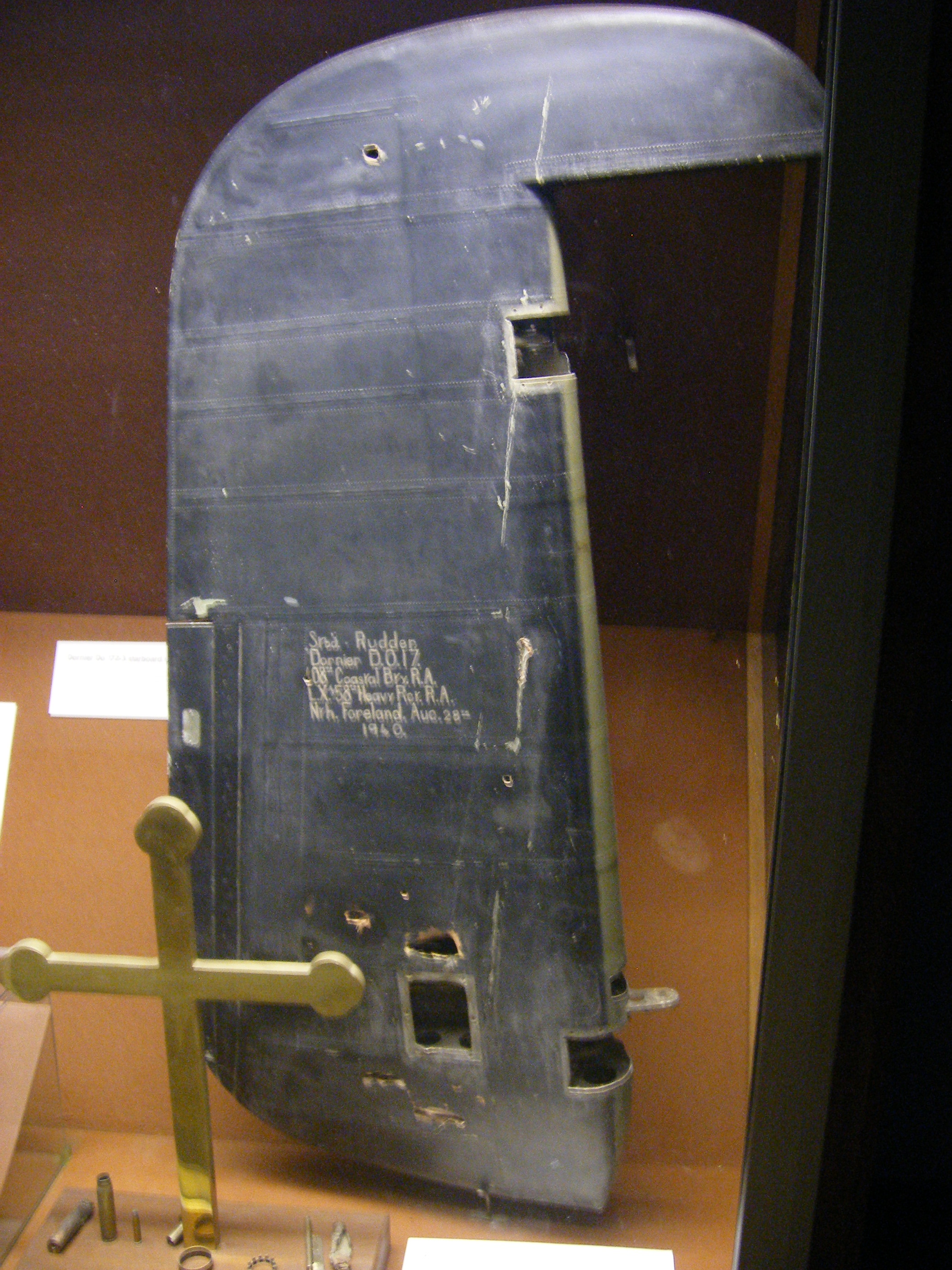
The rudder of a Dornier Do 17 shot down on 28 August 1940

Bulgaria

- The Bulgarian Air Force received 11 Do 17 Ms and Ps in 1940 and at least 11 ex-Yugoslav aircraft in 1941. Six more Do 17 Ms were delivered in 1943. They remained in service until at least 1945.

Independent State of Croatia

- The Air Force of the Independent State of Croatia (Zrakoplovstvo Nezavisne Države Hrvatske) received at least 21 Do 17Zs (the last 12 in 1945), 11 ex-Yugoslav Do 17Ka's in 1942 and 30 Do 17Es in 1943.

Finland

- Finnish Air Force
  - 46 Squadron received 15 aircraft in January 1942:

Germany

- Luftwaffe

Hungary

- Royal Hungarian Air Force received one ex-Yugoslavian Do 17Ka-3.

Italy

- Regia Aeronautica operated at least one ex-Yugoslavian Do 17Ka-3 under 1°Centro Sperimentale in Guidonia, where it was tested until September 1943.

Romania

- Royal Romanian Air Force received 10 worn Do 17Ms in November 1942.

Spanish State

- Spanish Air Force received ex-Legion Condor Do 17E, F, and Ps and 13 remained in service after the end of the Spanish Civil War.

Switzerland

- Swiss Air Force operated a single Do 17Z-2, interned after landing at Basel Airport in April 1940.

Kingdom of Yugoslavia

- Royal Yugoslav Air Force

United Kingdom

- Royal Air Force pressed into service two Yugoslav-built Do 17Ks which escaped Yugoslavia carrying King Peter and gold. The aircraft were given the serials AX706 and AX707. Both aircraft were destroyed in an air attack on Ismaïlia airfield on 27 August 1941.

United States

- United States Army Air Forces obtained at least one Do 17E-1, WkNr 2095. Renamed Axis Sally, it was taken to the United States after the war and tested.

== Surviving aircraft ==
=== Dornier Do 17Z Werknummer 1160 ===
1160 undergoing conservation in a hydration tunnel at the RAF Museum Cosford, July 2013

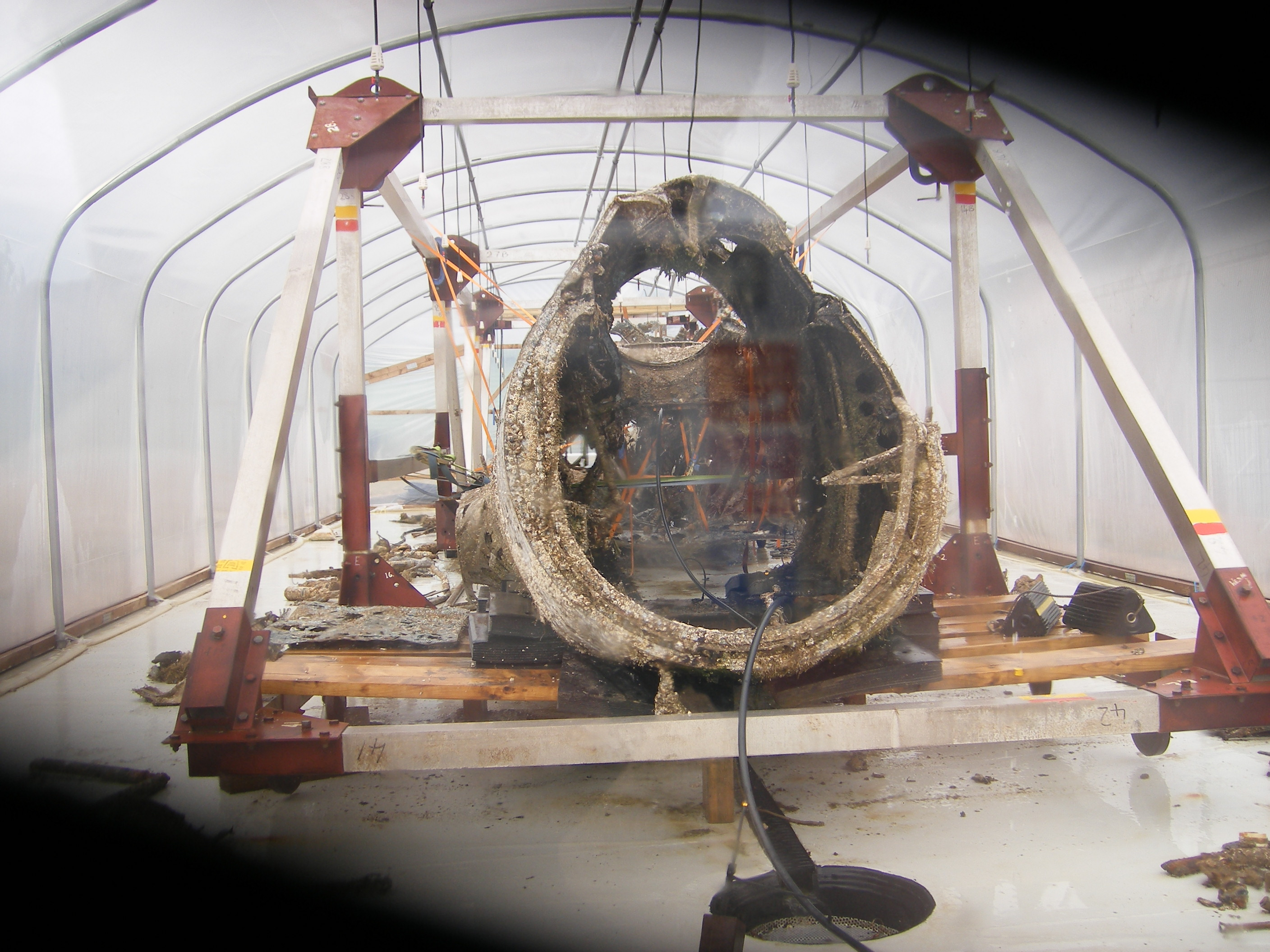
The fuselage, upside down with the cockpit area nearest the camera

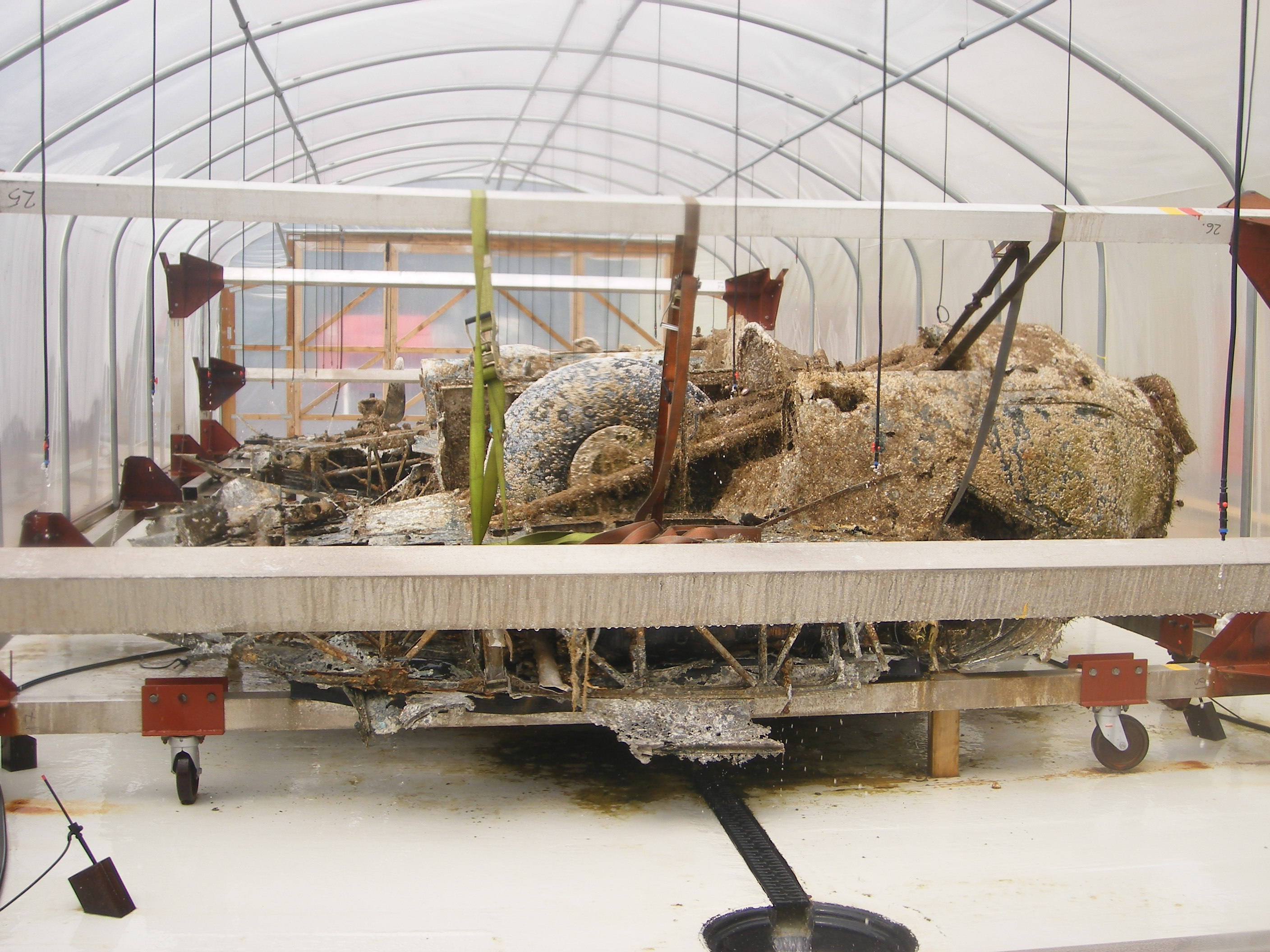
Port engine nacelle; note the tyre is still pressurized

Until 2007 none of the Dornier twin-engined bomber variants were thought to have survived intact, but various large relics of the Do 17 and Do 215 are held by public museums and private collectors. In September 2007 a Do 215 B-5 (variant of Do 17Z) was found largely intact in the shallow waters off Waddenzee in the Netherlands. On 3 September 2010, the RAF Museum announced that a Do 17 had been discovered in 50 ft (15 m) of water off the coast of England. The aircraft had been discovered in September 2008 on the Goodwin Sands, a large sandbank six kilometres (3.7 mi) off the coast of Kent, but the discovery was kept secret. The Dornier Do 17Z-2, Werknummer 1160, built under license by Henschel with the full Geschwaderkennung (combat wing aircraft ID code) of 5K+AR, was operated by 7 Staffel, III Gruppe, Kampfgeschwader 3.

On 26 August 1940, 5K+AR was taking part in a raid by KG 2 and KG 3, targeting the RAF stations RAF Debden and RAF Hornchurch. While flying over clouds, the aircraft became separated from the bomber formation and lost its bearings; it was then attacked by Boulton Paul Defiant fighters of No. 264 Squadron RAF. One of the Dornier's engines was disabled and the other damaged, so the wounded pilot, Feldwebel (flight sergeant) Willi Effmert, elected to make a crash landing on the Goodwin Sands. He and another crew member survived and were taken prisoner. The other two crew were killed; one is buried at Cannock Chase German war cemetery and the other in the Netherlands. The identity of the Defiant that shot down the Dornier is not certain, although it may have been one of three 264 Squadron aircraft that was shot down soon after in a battle with Messerschmitt Bf 109 fighter escorts from Jagdgeschwader 3.

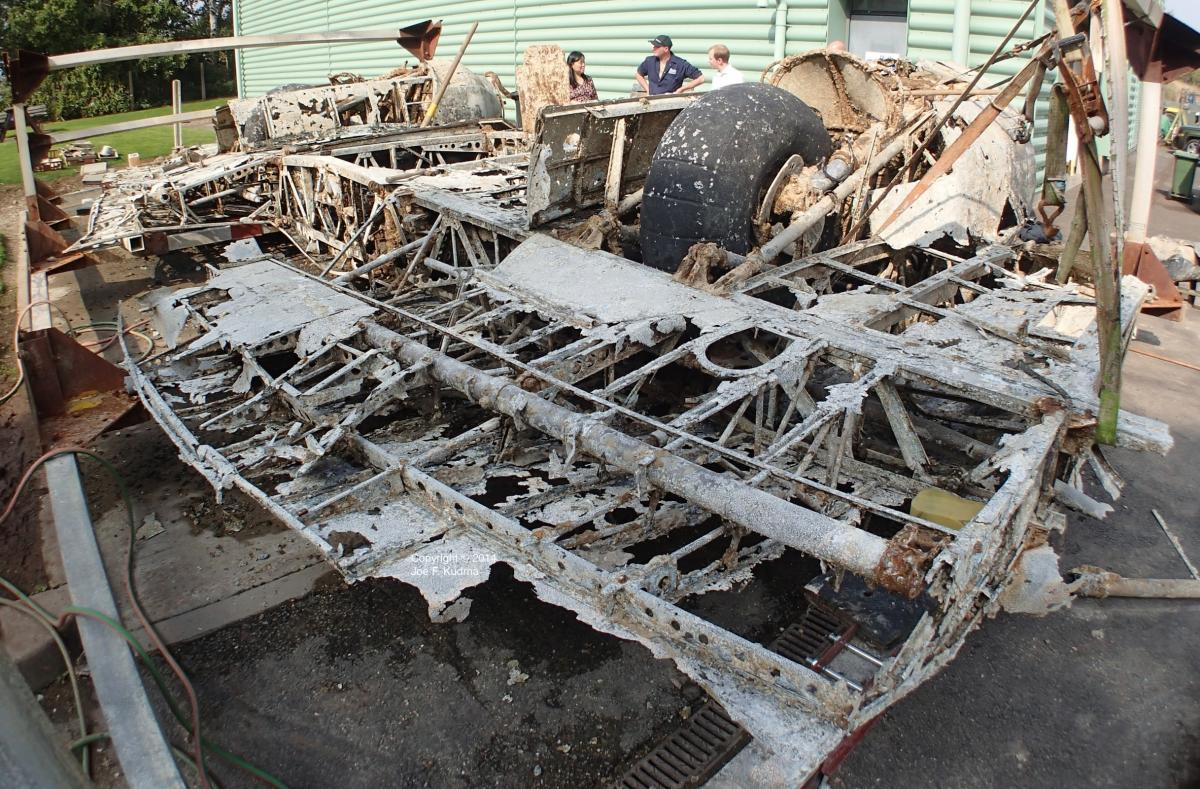
The wing section seen port side removed from tent for manual work (September 2014)

In June 2010 diving operations were carried out and the survey report indicated that the aircraft was largely complete, although 5K+AR lay inverted on the seabed, indicating that it ground-looped on landing. The port rudder, starboard stabiliser, forward nose glazing, undercarriage doors and engine cowling were missing, but the discovery of a small debris field associated with the wreck indicates that some or all of those parts may still be present at the site. Some items, including two of the Dornier's six MG 15 machine guns, are missing and are believed to have been removed by unauthorized divers sometime after the aircraft's discovery.

On 10 June 2013, a salvage team raised the airframe from the seabed. It was then taken to the Michael Beetham Restoration Centre at the Royal Air Force Museum's Cosford site, where metallurgists from Imperial College London have a significant role in the post-recovery conservation of the aircraft.

=== Dornier Do 17M-1 (Hansakollen, Norway) ===
On 2 July 1942, a Dornier Do 17M-1 crashed in Hansakollen in Maridalen, near Oslo, Norway. The Do 17 was heading to the airport at Gardermoen, but crashed into a mountainside. All three German aviators on board were killed. They are buried in the German war cemetery at Alfaset. The wreck is well preserved and remains clearly visible, nearly 80 years after the accident.

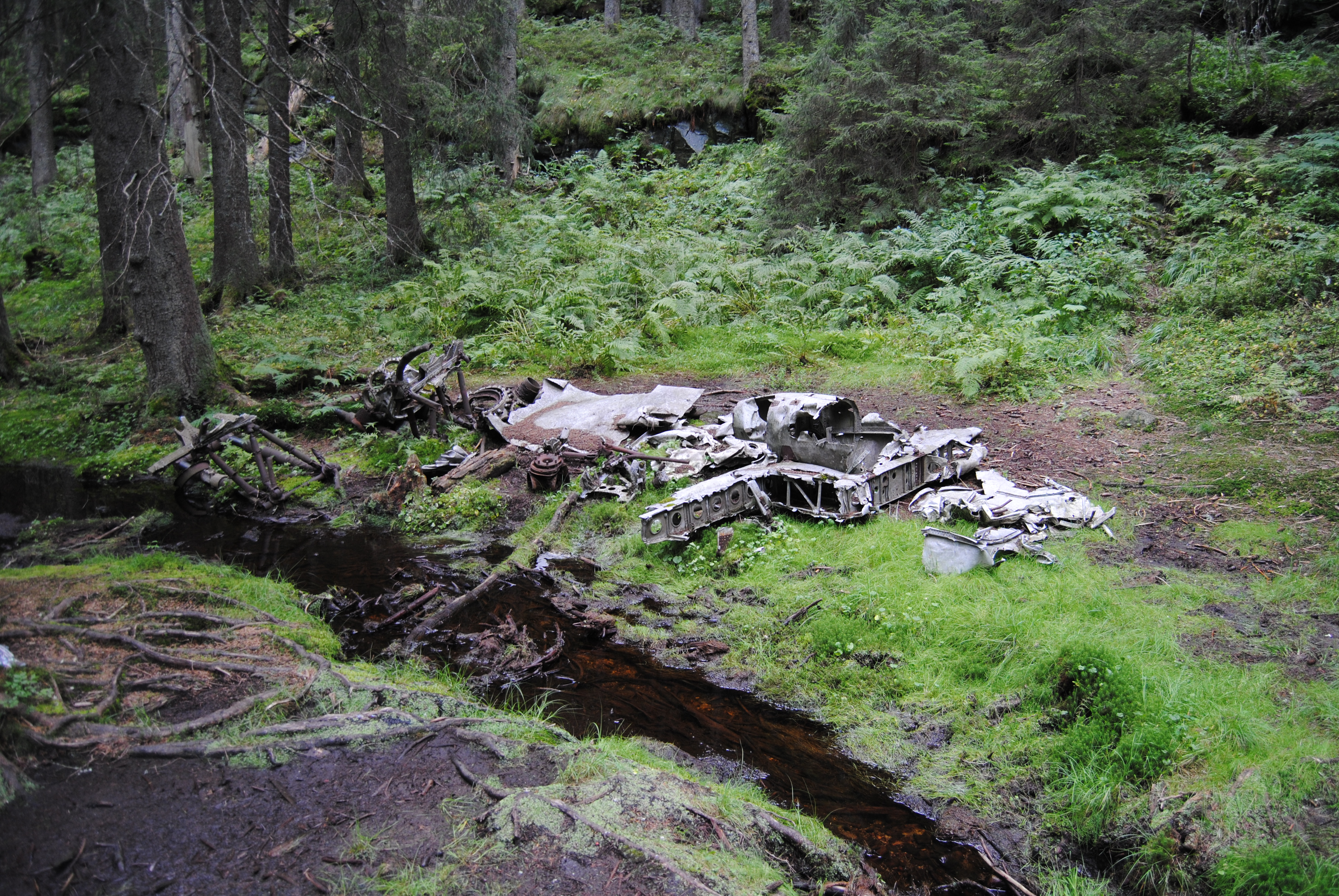

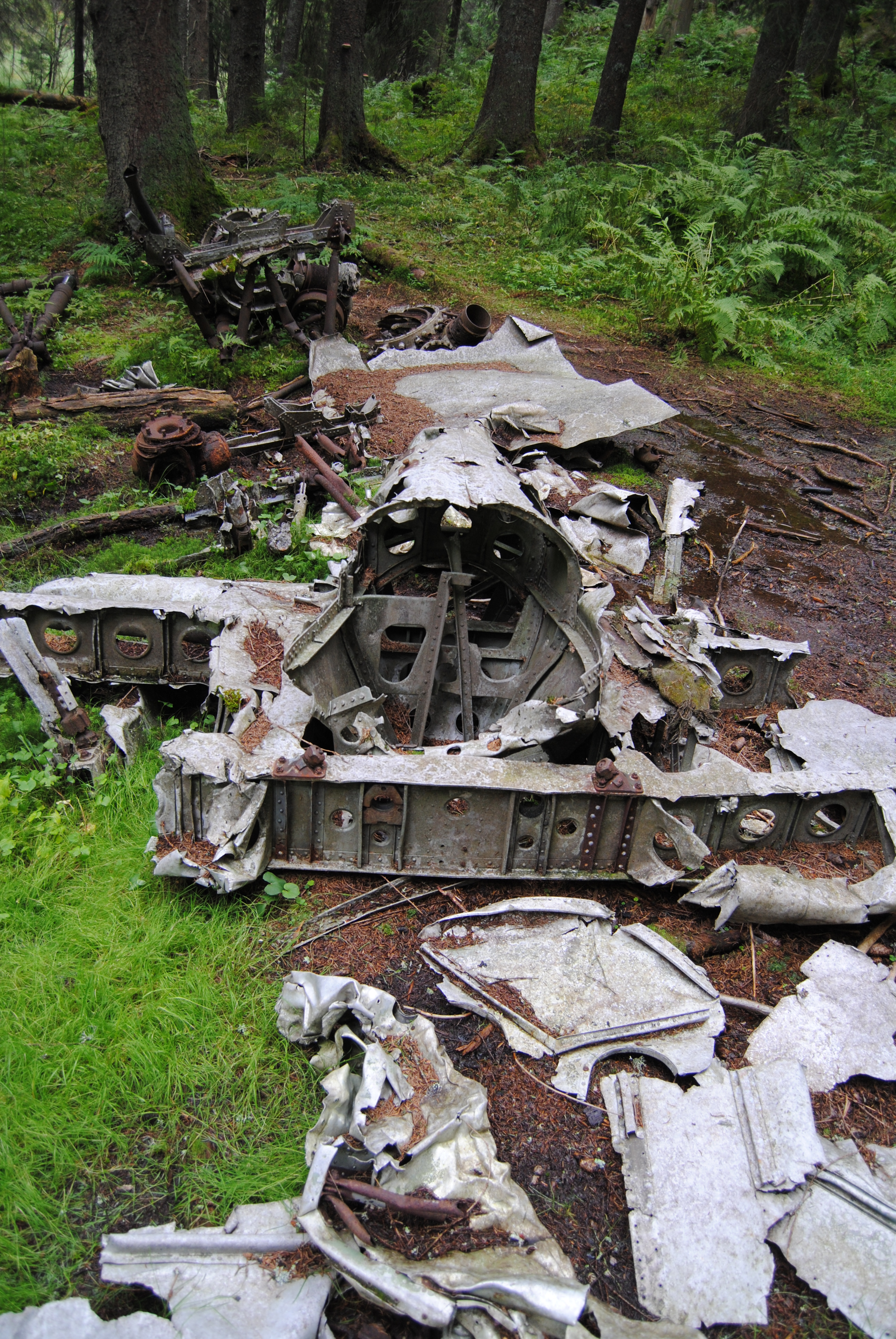

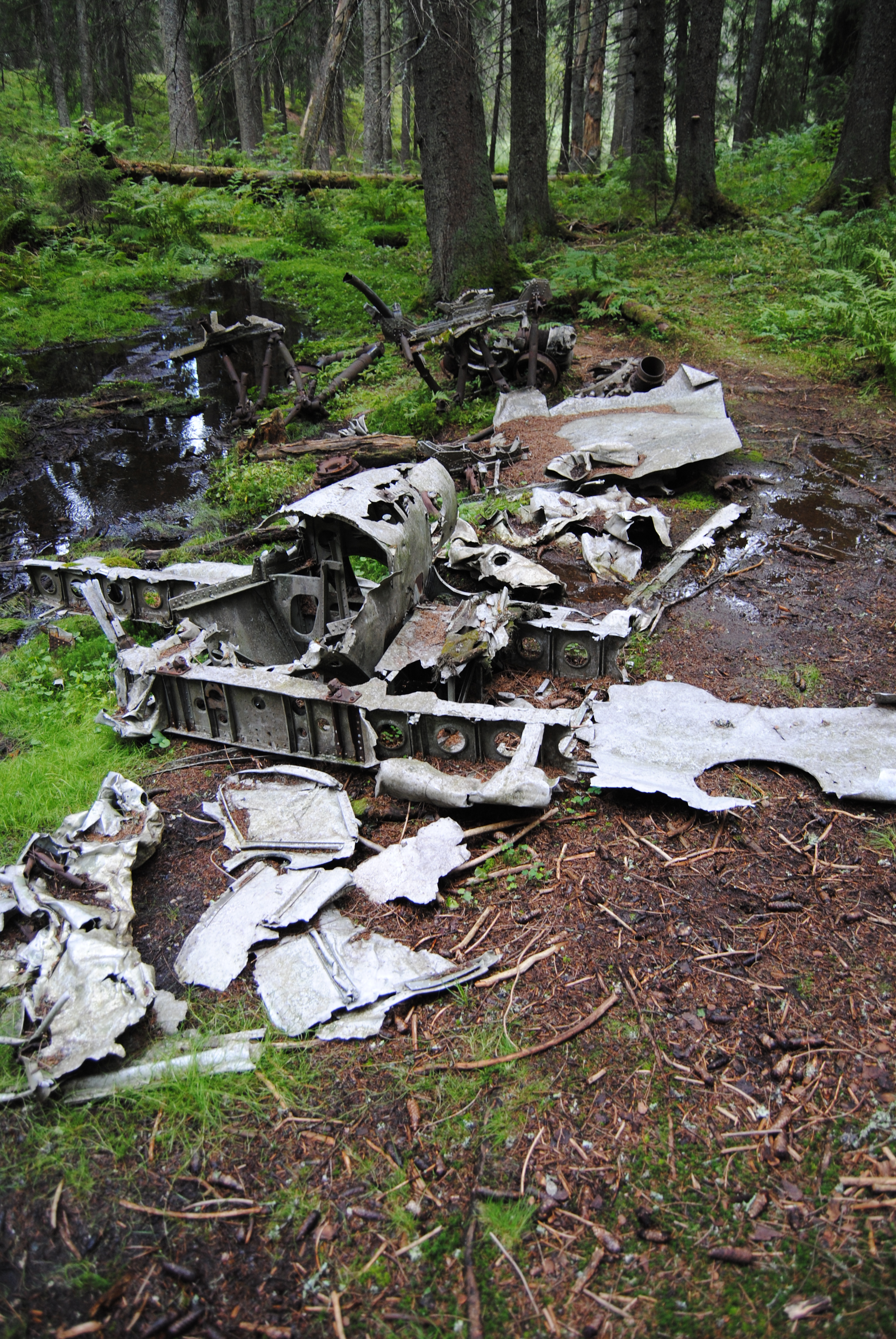

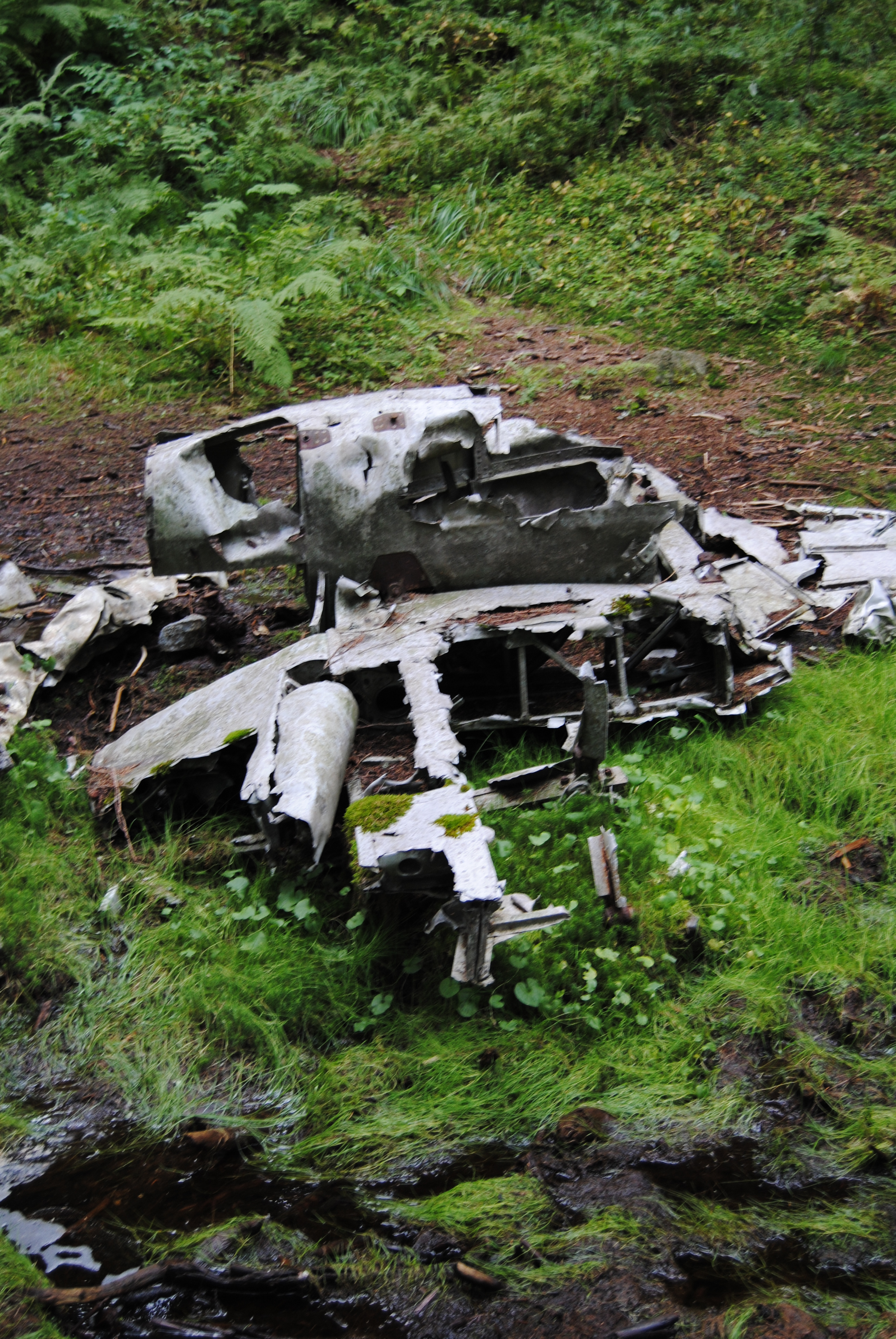

== Specifications (Do 17 Z-2) ==
3-view drawing of Do-17Z-2

Data from Aircraft of the Third Reich, Fighters and Bombers of World War II and Do 17 Z-2 Baubeschreibung, April 1938

General characteristics

- Crew: 4
- Length: 15.8 m (51 ft 10 in)
- Wingspan: 18 m (59 ft 1 in)
- Height: 4.56 m (15 ft 0 in)
- Empty weight: 5,210 kg (11,486 lb) * Empty equipped: 5,888 to 5,963 kg (12,981 to 13,146 lb)
- Max takeoff weight: 8,837 kg (19,482 lb)
- Fuel capacity: standard fuel 1,540 L (339 imp gal; 407 US gal), with aux tank in forward bomb bay 2,435 L (536 imp gal; 643 US gal)
- Powerplant: 2 × Bramo 323P 9-cyl. air-cooled radial piston engines with 1,000 PS (986 hp, 736 kW) for take-off
- Propellers: 3-bladed variable-pitch propellers

Performance

- Maximum speed: 350 km/h (220 mph, 190 kn) at 8,040 kg (17,725 lb) at sea level

410 km/h (255 mph; 221 kn) at 8,040 kg (17,725 lb) at 5,000 m (16,404 ft)

- Cruise speed: 300 km/h (190 mph, 160 kn) at 8,837 kg (19,482 lb) at 4,000 m (13,123 ft)
- Combat range: 660 km (410 mi, 360 nmi) with 1,540 L (339 imp gal; 407 US gal) fuel and 1,000 kg (2,205 lb) of bombs

1,010 km (628 mi; 545 nmi) with 2,435 L (536 imp gal; 643 US gal) fuel and 500 kg (1,102 lb) of bombs

- Service ceiling: 8,200 m (26,900 ft)
- Wing loading: 156 kg/m^{2} (32 lb/sq ft)
- Power/mass: 0.170 kW/kg (0.11 hp/lb)

Armament

- Guns: 6 × 7.92 mm (0.312 in) MG 15 machine guns in front upper/lower, rear upper/lower and beam positions (all firing from cockpit area)
- Bombs: 1,000 kg (2,205 lb) of bombs carried internally, either 20 × 50 kg (110 lb) bombs or 4 × 250 kg (551 lb) bombs

== See also ==
Related development

- Dornier Do 215
- Dornier Do 217
- Dornier Do 317

Aircraft of comparable role, configuration, and era

- Bloch MB.170
- Bristol Blenheim
- Martin Maryland
- Mitsubishi G3M
- PZL.37 Łoś
- Saab 18
- Tupolev SB

Related lists

- List of aircraft of World War II
- List of bomber aircraft
- List of military aircraft of Germany
