= SC1200 bomb =

SC 1200
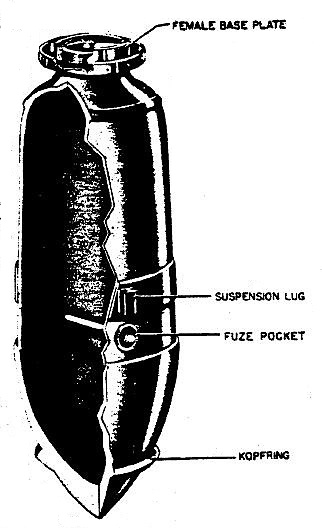
- SC 1200 in cross-section without tail
- Type: General-purpose bomb
- Place of origin: Germany

Service history
- Used by: Luftwaffe
- Wars: World War II

Specifications
- Mass: 1,117 kg (2,463 lb)
- Length: 2.77 m (9 ft 1 in)
- Diameter: 650 mm (25.6 in)
- Warhead: Trialen
- Warhead weight: 631 kg (1,391 lb)

The SC 1200 (Sprengbombe Cylindrisch) or cylindrical explosive bomb in English was a general-purpose bomb used by the Luftwaffe during World War II.

== Design ==
It had a drawn steel body with a heavy cast steel nose cap for armor penetration and was similar to the preceding SC 1000 in construction. It was filled with Trialen 105, a mixture of 15% RDX, 70% TNT and 15% aluminium powder. A central exploder tube of high grade TNT ran down the center of the explosives to ensure detonation. At the other end was a base plate, just forward of which the magnesium alloy tail was tack welded onto the body, and also bolted to the tail attachment brace. Around the nose of the bomb was a kopfring - a metal ring, triangular in cross section, designed to prevent ground penetration or to stop forward momentum when hitting water. The bomb was attached to the aircraft horizontally by an attachment band and hung from a H-type suspension lug in a bomb bay or mounted on a fuselage hardpoint.
