= SC2000 bomb =

SC 2000
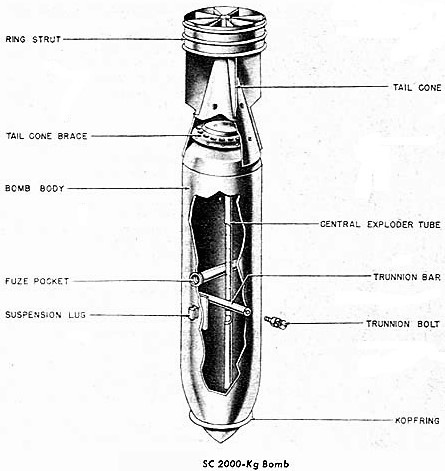
- Type: General-purpose bomb
- Place of origin: Germany

Service history
- Used by: Luftwaffe
- Wars: World War II

Specifications
- Mass: 1,950 kg (4,300 lb)
- Length: 3.45 m (11 ft 4 in)
- Diameter: 660 mm (26 in)
- Warhead: Amatol
- Warhead weight: 975 kg (2,150 lb)

The SC 2000 (Sprengbombe Cylindrisch) or cylindrical explosive bomb in English was a general-purpose bomb used by the Luftwaffe during World War II.

== Design ==
The SC 2000 had a single piece forged and machined steel body and was similar to the preceding SC 1800 in construction. Around the nose of the bomb was a kopfring - a metal ring, triangular in cross section, designed to prevent ground penetration or to stop forward momentum when hitting water. The SC 2000 was filled with Amatol, had a single transverse fuze like the SC 1800 and a central exploder tube which ran through the explosives. The SC 2000 had a circular braced tail ring with four fins. Inside the bomb casing there was a reinforced H-type suspension lug and it could be horizontally suspended in a bomb bay or horizontally mounted on a fuselage hardpoint. There were also lugs that could be fitted for dive bombing.
