= SC50 bomb =

SC 50
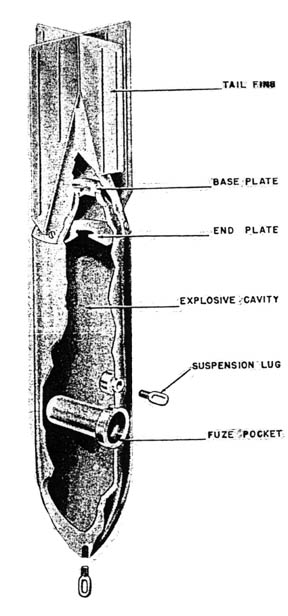
- Sc 50bi
- Type: General-purpose bomb
- Place of origin: Nazi Germany

Service history
- Used by: Luftwaffe
- Wars: World War II

Production history
- Variants: bi, Ja, JB, JC, J, J/2, L

Specifications
- Mass: 55 kg (121 lb)
- Length: 1.09 m (3 ft 7 in)
- Diameter: 203 mm (8 in)
- Warhead: Amatol; Trotyl; Trialen
- Warhead weight: 16.4 kg (36 lb)
- Detonation mechanism: Transverse fuze

The SC 50 (Sprengbombe Cylindrisch) or cylindrical explosive bomb in English was a family of general-purpose bombs used by the Luftwaffe during World War II.

== Design ==
The SC50 bomb has eight variants and multiple ways they were manufactured, each from one-piece drawn steel bodies to separate steel pieces welded together with a total weight of 48 kilograms (106 lb) to 55 kilograms (121 lb). The bomb was usually filled with a mixture of 40% amatol and 60% Trotyl, but when used as an anti-shipping bomb it was filled with Trialen, a mixture of 15% hexogen, 70% Trotyl and 15% aluminium powder. The SC 50 could be fitted with either an anti-ricochet adapter for anti-ship use or a Stabo Spike that kept the bomb upright and exploded the bomb before it buried itself for anti-personnel use. It could be vertically or horizontally suspended in a bomb bay or horizontally mounted on a wing or fuselage hardpoint.

== Variants ==
=== Standard ===
Data for SC 50 Bi bomb
	Metric
Overall length	46.1 inches (1,171 mm)
Body length	30.0 inches (762 mm)
Body diameter	7.9 inches (201 mm)
Tail width	16.1 inches (409 mm)
Filling weight	24.4 kilograms (54 lb)
Total weight	55 kilograms (121 lb)
Charge/weight ratio	45.75%
Explosive filling	Cast Trotyl, Amatol or Trialen
Bomb type	High explosive

- (SC 50 Bi) Single piece cast steel body which is machined down. All fittings are welded into place. A single transverse fuze pocket is located slightly forward of the horizontal lug. The fuze pocket is secured to the opposite wall with a single weld. The fuze pocket will accommodate two picric pellets along with a normal sized electric fuze. The nose has threading which will accommodate an eye-bolt utilized for vertical suspension. A shock plate (similar to a kopfring) may be welded to the bomb nose in an attempt to prevent ricochet when used against targets in the water.

=== Grade I ===
Data for SC 50 Ja, L, Stabo bomb
	Metric
Overall length	Ja and L 1090mm (43.3 in), Stabo 1570mm (61.8 in)
Body length	760mm (30 in)
Body diameter	200mm (8 in)
Tail width	280mm (11 in)
Tail length	409mm (16.1 in)
Filling weight	21.0 kilograms (46 lb) to 25.0 kilograms (55 lb)
Total weight	48 kilograms (106 lb) to 55 kilograms (121 lb)
Charge/weight ratio	46%
Explosive filling	Trotyl, powdered Amatol or cast Trialen
Bomb type	High explosive

- (SC 50 Ja) The Ja variant is made from a one-piece drawn steel body.
- (SC 50 L) The L variant is the same as the Ja variant with the exception that its body is made from seamless tubular steel.
- (SC 50 Stabo) The Stabo variant is also like the Ja variant with the exception that it has a threaded lug forged to the nose of the bomb allowing for an 18.5 inches (470 mm) steel spike which is 1.8 inches (46 mm) in diameter to be secured to the lug which allows the bomb to detonate above ground, typically at a height of a person.

=== Grade II ===
Data for SC 50 J, JB, JC, J/1 bomb
	Metric
Overall length	1090mm (43.3 in)
Body length	670mm (26.4 in)
Body diameter	200mm (8 in)
Tail width	280mm (11 in)
Tail length	409mm (16.1 in)
Filling weight	21.0 kilograms (46 lb) to 25.0 kilograms (55 lb)
Total weight	48 kilograms (106 lb) to 55 kilograms (121 lb)
Charge/weight ratio	46%
Explosive filling	Trotyl, powdered Amatol or cast Trialen
Bomb type	High explosive

- (SC 50 J) The J was made as a one-piece nose and body with the base welded to the body.
- (SC 50 JB) The JB variant is the later model of the J variant, with identical construction.
- (SC 50 JC) The JC variant was composed of two pieces, nose and body. The nose was made of pressed steel and the body was made of drawn steel. The nose and base plate were welded to the body of the bomb body.
- (SC 50 J/2) The J/2 variant was similar to the JC variant with the exception of the quality of steel used for manufacturing. This variant was only produced in limited quantities.

== 2015 Wembley bomb ==
In May 2015 an SC 50 was unearthed at a building site on Empire Way in Wembley, London. The bomb was dropped during The Blitz on London by the Luftwaffe in 1940. Bomb disposal experts from 11 Explosive Ordnance Disposal in the Royal Logistic Corps attempted to defuse it, but this was unsuccessful and the bomb was later removed and safely detonated at a secret location.

== Popular culture ==
In the Dad's Army episode "Something Nasty in the Vault", an unexploded SC50 traps Captain Mainwaring and Sergeant Wilson in the bank vault.

== Photo gallery ==
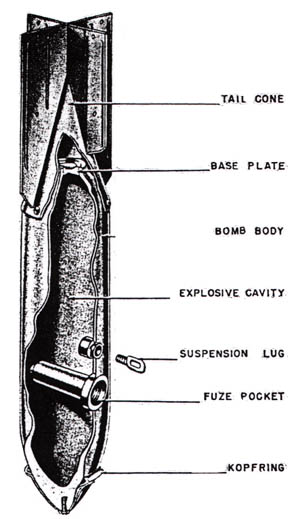
Sc 50Ja

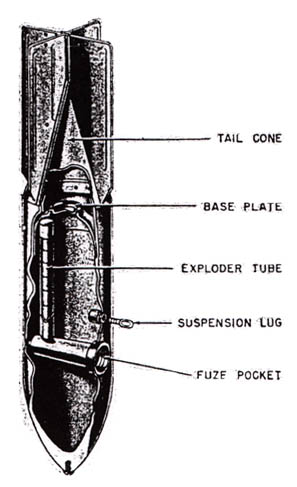
Sc 50JB

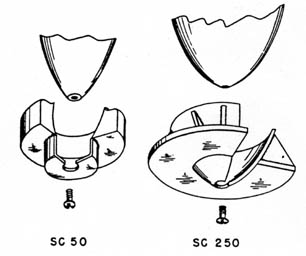
Anti-ricochet rings.

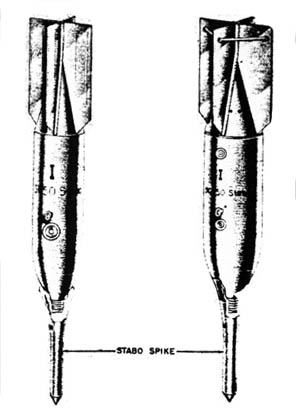
Stabo spikes.
