= SC 500 bomb =

SC 500
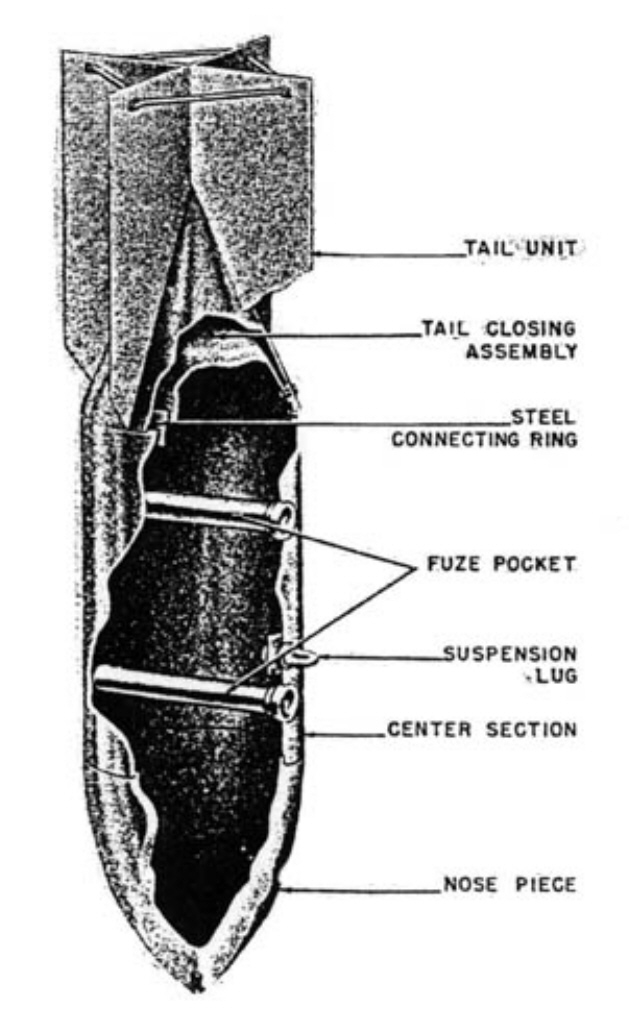
- Type: General-purpose bomb
- Place of origin: Germany

Service history
- Used by: Luftwaffe
- Wars: World War II

Production history
- Variants: K, L2, J

Specifications
- Mass: 500 kg (1,100 lb)
- Length: 2.03 m (6 ft 8 in)
- Diameter: 457 mm (18 in)
- Warhead: Amatol; TNT; Trialen
- Warhead weight: 220 kg (490 lb)

The SC 500 was a Sprengbombe Cylindrisch ("cylindrical explosive bomb") family of 500 kg weight general-purpose bombs used by the Luftwaffe of Nazi Germany during World War II.

== Design ==
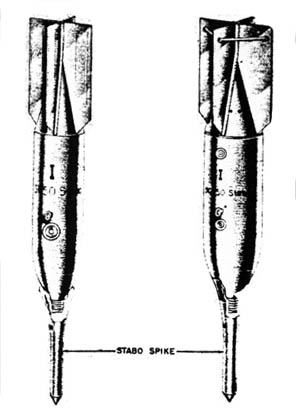
Stabo Spike.

The bombs had three-piece drawn steel bodies with a heavy machined nose cap for armor penetration. At the other end was a base plate, just forward of which the magnesium alloy tail was tack-welded onto the body, and also bolted to the tail attachment brace. The bomb was usually filled with a mixture of 40% amatol and 60% Trotyl, but when used as an anti-shipping bomb it was filled with Trialen 105, a mixture of 15% hexogen, 70% Trotyl and 15% aluminium powder. Around the nose of the bomb could be fitted an optional kopfring - a metal ring, triangular in cross section, designed to prevent ground penetration or to stop forward momentum when hitting water (to prevent the bomb from skipping off the water). The bomb could also be fitted with a Stabo Spike which was a device that prevented the bomb from burying itself in the ground before detonation to increase its anti-personnel effectiveness (similar to the US "Daisy Cutter" fuse). The bomb was attached to the aircraft horizontally by an H-type suspension lug. It could be horizontally suspended in a bomb bay or horizontally mounted on a wing or fuselage hardpoint.

== Post-war ordnance ==
On 20 February 2024 an unexploded SC 500 was found in a garden in Plymouth, England during building work; the area was evacuated for three days. The bomb was eventually removed and detonated at sea. It saw the first non-test use for the UK's Emergency Alert System.

On 15 August 2024 an SC 500 was found on a building site on the Rivenwood housing development in Newtownards, County Down. The bomb was destroyed in a controlled explosion five days later.

On 22 March 2025, a World War II-era SC 500 bomb was discovered in the River Ure, between Bishop Monkton and Newby Hall in Ripon, North Yorkshire, England. The unexploded ordnance was safely detonated in situ on 26 March 2025 by a bomb disposal team from Glasgow.
