= SC250 bomb =

General purpose high-explosive bomb

SC 250
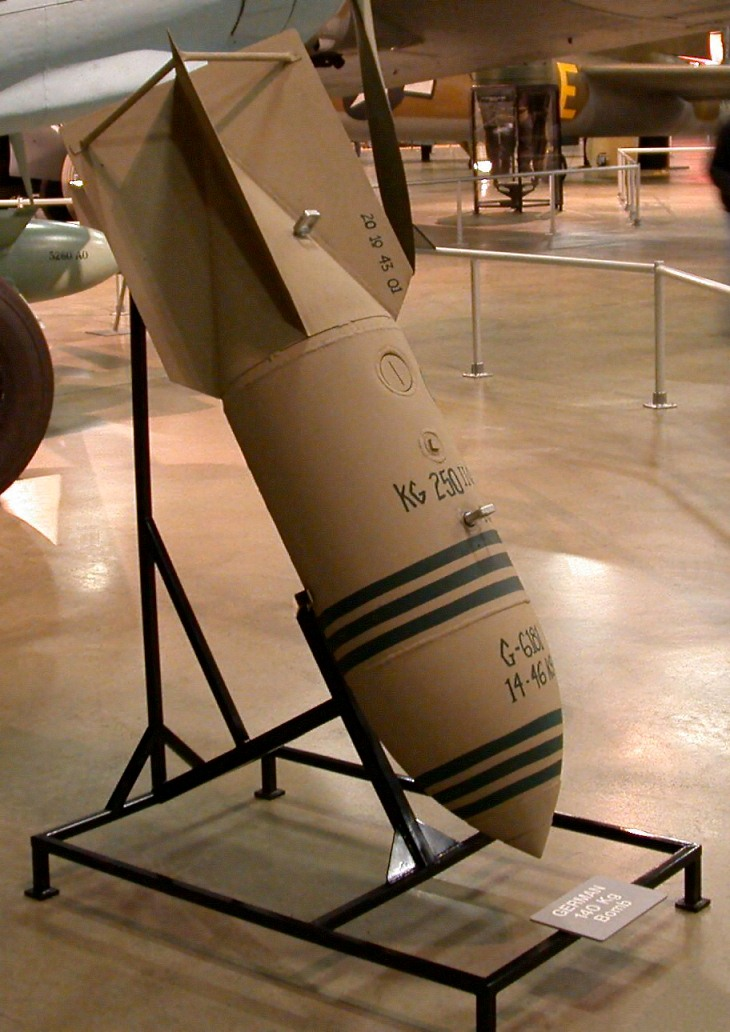
- SC 250 at the National Museum of the United States Air Force
- Type: General purpose HE bomb
- Place of origin: Germany

Service history
- Used by: Luftwaffe
- Wars: World War II

Specifications
- Mass: 250 kg (550 lb)
- Length: 164 cm (65 in) (overall); 117.3 cm (46.2 in) (body)
- Diameter: 36.8 cm (14.5 in)
- Filling: Cast Trotyl, cast Amatol, cast Trialen or pressed Ammonal charge
- Filling weight: 130 kg (290 lb)

The SC 250 (Sprengbombe Cylindrisch 250) was an air-dropped general purpose high-explosive bomb built and used extensively by Germany during World War II. It could be carried by almost all German bomber aircraft, and was used effectively by the Junkers Ju 87 Stuka (Sturzkampfflugzeug or dive-bomber). The bomb's weight was about 250 kg, from which its designation was derived.

It was used in any theatres of war, and was feared for its destructive power. The SC 250 was one of the most commonly used German bombs in World War II, and was used extensively during the Blitz on London.

== Design ==
Different variants of the bomb's body were made for different purposes, with a strong body mainly for penetration of targets, and a less strong body for detonation on impact.

After forging the body or welding on the nose cone and the aft cone, the bomb was fitted with the exploder tube and fuze pocket, and filled with explosive. The body was then sealed with the base plate, and the four-finned tail was attached. The overall weight was 250 kg (550 lb) (245–256 kg), and the bomb body was 117.3 cm (46.2 in) long, 164 cm (65 in) including the tail, and 36.8 cm (14.5 in) in diameter. Bombs were held in place in the aircraft carrying them by suspension lugs, which could be fitted either to the nose to hold the bomb vertically in an internal bomb bay, or to the aircraft body if it was slung horizontally below the fuselage or wing.

=== Variants ===
The nose cone and the body of the grade (Güteklasse) I bomb were sometimes forged out of a single piece of high-quality alloyed steel, or the nose was welded to the body; these bombs had a very strong body to be able to penetrate a robust target before detonating, and were also used as "Stabos" ("spike bombs"). Grade II and grade III versions of the bomb were made of separate nose cone, main body and aft cone parts welded together; the mechanical strength of the grade II bombs was approximately 80% of that of the grade I, and the grade III bombs were about 40% as strong; these bombs were used on targets where detonation on impact was preferable.

Type 1 (Güteklasse I)

- Model JA: One piece construction of forged steel.
- Model L: One piece construction of tube steel.
- Model L2: Two piece construction, nose of forged steel, body of tube steel. Sometimes fitted with a 700 mm (28 in) spike to ensure detonation above ground, called a "Stabo", (Stachelbombe, "Spike Bomb").

Type 2 (Güteklasse II)

- Model JB: Two-piece construction of forged steel.

Type 3 (Güteklasse III)

- Model JC: Three piece construction, nose and aft cone of forged steel, body made of tube steel.
- Model B: Three piece construction; nose of cast steel, body of tube steel, and base of arched steel case.
- Model K: Three-piece construction; nose of cast hardened steel, body of tube steel, and base of cast steel.

=== Payload ===
There were many explosive fillings, all weighing ca. 125 kg (276 lb) (125–130 kg):

- Cast Trotyl (TNT) (German code "14" or "Fp. 02"),
- Cast Füllpulver 60/40 (Fp. 60/40, amatol containing 60% Trotyl, codename "13").
- Cast Füllpulver 50/50 (Fp. 50/50, amatol with 50% Trotyl, codename "13A").
- Cast Amatol 39 (50% 1,3-dinitrobenzene, 35% ammonium nitrate, 15% hexogen, codename "52"),
- Cast Amatol 40 (50% 2,4-dinitroanisole, 35% ammonium nitrate, 15% hexogen, codename "17").
- Cast Amatol 41 (52% ammonium nitrate, 6% calcium nitrate, 30% ethylenediamine dinitrate, 10% hexogen, 2% montan wax, codename "88").
- Pressed Ammonal D (90% ammonium nitrate, 5% naphthalene, 2.5% wood meal and 2.5% aluminium powder, codename "110").
- Pressed Ammonal DJ (70% ammonium nitrate, 20% trotyl, 10% aluminium powder, codename "113").
- Pressed Ammonal DJ1 (76% ammonium nitrate, 20% trotyl, 4% coarse aluminium powder, codename "114").
- Cast Trialen 105 (70% Trotyl, 15% hexogen, 15% aluminium powder, codename "105").

Bombs filled with Trialen 105 were to be used especially as water bombs/depth charges against enemy shipping and submarines; however they could also used to great effect against land targets.

=== Fuzes ===
The SC 250 could be fitted with a variety of fuzes depending on the target:

- Type 25B electric impact fuze. This could be set to instantaneous detonation, short delay (less than 1 second), or for a 17-second delay.
- Type 17 electric clockwork fuze. This was a time-delay fuze; the Type 17 and 17A could be set for any time between 2 and 72 hours after dropping, while the 17B could be set to detonate between 3 and 135 minutes later. To prevent the bombs being defused by bomb disposal personnel they were booby-trapped with:
  - Type ZUS 40 mechanical antiwithdrawal fuze, a simple spring-loaded detonator fitted to prevent the removal of the fuze, causing immediate detonation if moved by more than 15 mm (0.59 in).
  - Type 50 and 50B (called "Type Y" by the British from a distinguishing marking stamped on the face of the fuse) electric anti-disturbance fuze. This used three mercury switches to detonate the bomb if the fuze was disturbed or rotated. John Pilkington Hudson was awarded the George Medal in 1943 for being the first to successfully disable a Y fuze (he used liquid oxygen to cool the bomb which deadened the device's internal batteries).
- Type 38 electric impact fuze, designed for use at low level against shipping; the Type 38sl. was for use as an anti-submarine bomb.
- Type 59B electric aerial burst fuze. Could be set to detonate 12, 41 or 58 seconds after release.
- Type 79 electric aerial burst fuze. Could be set to detonate 3, 10, 25 or 30 seconds after release.

== Post-war discoveries ==
Unexploded wartime SC250 bombs, now more than 80 years old, continue to be found. They are still dangerous and can explode if disturbed, requiring them to be disarmed or detonated safely. Cases since 2015 include:

- On 23 March 2015, a SC250 was unearthed at a building site in Bermondsey, South London. It was safely detonated in a quarry in Kent two days later.
- A SC250 bomb was found in Portsmouth Harbour during dredging work to widen the port's channel in February 2017. It was removed by a Royal Navy Explosive Ordnance Disposal team and detonated out at sea.
- In April 2017, a bomb was found in Minsk during the demolition of BelExpo complex.
- An SC250 bomb was found at a building site in Aston, Birmingham on 15 May 2017, it was detonated on site a day later.
- In May 2017, a bomb was unearthed at a building site in Ternopil, Ukraine.
- In January 2019, an SC250 bomb was found on a construction site in Skopje, Macedonia. Later it was detonated in the military base Krivolak.
- On 23 May 2019, an SC250 was discovered during construction works near Kingston University Campus, London, UK.
- On 15 December 2020, an explosion under a fishing boat off the coast of Norfolk, England, which damaged the boat and severely injured the crew, who were said to be "fortunate not to be killed", was determined to have been due to a powerful wartime bomb on the seabed, disturbed by the fishing equipment.
- On 12 May 2022, an SC250 was found in Ta’ Qali, Malta while excavation works were being carried out behind the aviation museum
- On 7 February 2023, an SC250 was found in the River Yare at Great Yarmouth during dredging works at the site of the new third river crossing.
- On 26 May 2023, an SC250 was found during construction work on the Staszica Square in Wrocław in Poland.
- On 9 April 2024, an SC250 was found during street lighting construction work in Vilnius, Lithuania. Later it was detonated in the Rūdninkai military facility.
- An SC250 was found at a building site in heavily-bombed Plymouth, England, on 29 April 2026 and could not be moved safely, requiring a 400 m cordon and evacuation of 1,260 dwellings until it was made safe where it lay. Most of the explosive charge was burned safely, but part detonated during the process, confirming that these devices remained very dangerous. Many more such unexploded bombs were expected to remain—"the south coast is probably littered with bombs".
- On 28 September 2026, an SC250 dropped during the German bombing of Belgrade in 1941 was discovered during construction work on Poenkareova Street in the Palilula municipality of Belgrade, Serbia. The bomb held around 130 kg of explosive and was fitted with an electric fuze. Because of this, the Ministry of Internal Affairs decided to destroy it where it lay instead of moving it to a range outside the city, which had been the usual practice for earlier finds. Residents were evacuated from the danger zone early on 4 October 2026, and the bomb was destroyed in a controlled detonation that same morning in an operation involving about 350 police and emergency personnel. The explosion was felt in the surrounding area.
- On 15 October 2026, an SC250 was found in Wrocław in Poland. This prompted the evacuation of around 3000 residents near the Kolejowa 6/20 street on 20 October 2026.

== Photo Gallery ==
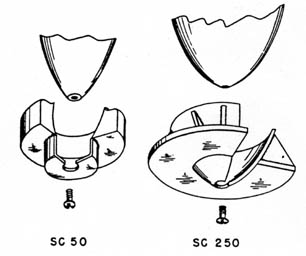
Anti-ricochet rings.

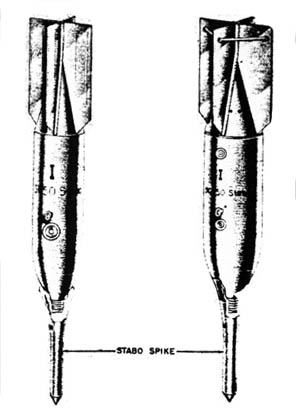
Stabo spikes.

== Citations ==
Bibliography

- German Explosive Ordnance (Bombs, Fuzes, Rockets, Land Mines, Grenades & Igniters) (PDF) (Report). US Departments of the Army and the Air Force. March 1953. Army Technical Manual TM 9-1985-2/Air Force Technical Order TO 39B-1A-9.
