= Metals Disintegrating Company =

The Metals Disintegrating Company manufactured metal powders such as aluminum powder. It was founded in 1916 by Everett Joel Hall (1879–1931), a professor of assaying at Columbia University. It was acquired by Alcan in 1963 and renamed as Alcan Powders and Pigments. The aluminium powder business was separated and is now part of Toyal America while the copper-based powder business continued as ACuPowder International
