= SC1000 bomb =

SC 1000
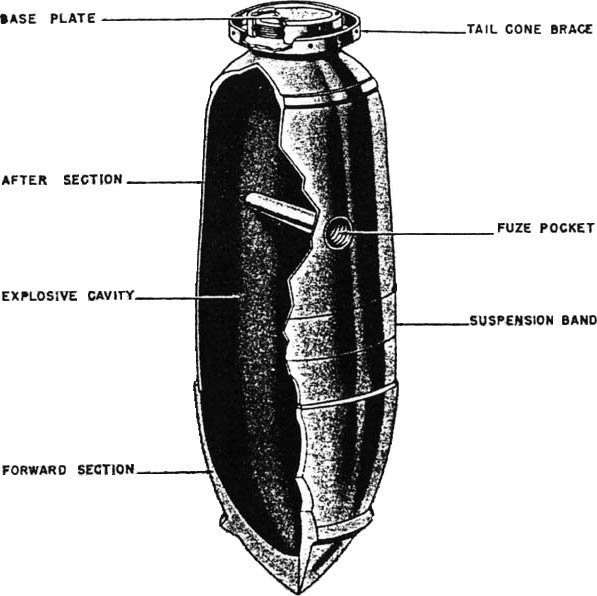
- SC 1000 in cross-section without tail
- Type: General purpose HE bomb
- Place of origin: Germany

Service history
- In service: from December, 1941
- Used by: Luftwaffe

Specifications
- Mass: 1,090 kg (2,400 lb) (C); 1,002 kg (2,209 lb) (L & L2)
- Length: Overall; 278 cm (109 in) (C & L2); 255 cm (100 in) (L); Body; 190 cm (75 in) (C & L2); 174 cm (69 in) (L)
- Diameter: 66 cm (26.0 in) (C); 64.8 cm (25.5 in) (L); 65 cm (25.6 in) (L2)
- Filling: Amatol (40%) / Trotyl (60%); Trialen 105
- Filling weight: 620 kg (1,370 lb) (C); 530 kg (1,170 lb) (L); 600 kg (1,300 lb) (L2)

The SC 1000 (Sprengbombe Cylindrisch 1000) or cylindrical explosive bomb was a large air-dropped general-purpose thin-cased high explosive demolition bomb used by Germany during World War II. Weighing more than 1,000 kg (2,200 lb), it was nicknamed the Hermann by the Germans in reference to the Luftwaffe commander, Hermann Göring.

== Design ==
In December 1941, the bomb had a body of drawn steel to which a heavy pointed nose cone was welded. At the other end was a base plate, just forward of which the magnesium alloy tail was tack welded onto the body, and also bolted to the tail attachment brace. Around the nose of the bomb was a kopfring - a metal ring, triangular in cross section, designed to prevent ground penetration or to stop forward momentum when hitting water. The bomb was attached to the aircraft horizontally by a H-type suspension lug.

The bomb was fitted with a single transverse fuse pocket. The bomb was usually filled with a mixture of 40% amatol and 60% Trotyl, but when used as an anti-shipping bomb it was filled with Trialen 105, a mixture of 15% hexogen, 70% Trotyl and 15% aluminium powder. A central exploder tube of high-grade TNT was put down the centre of the explosive to ensure high order detonation.

The bombs were painted sky-blue with a yellow stripe in the tail cone, unless filled with Trialen in which case it was replaced by the silhouette of a sinking ship in yellow, and the warning Nur gegen Handelsschiffe ("only against merchant ships") was stencilled on the bomb casing.

=== Variants ===
There were three variants of the bomb, designated Type C, L and L2, all of the same design, but which varied slightly in size and weight.

== Fuses ==
The bomb was fitted with a variety of fuses including:

- Type 25B electric impact fuse. This could be set to instantaneous detonation, short delay (less than 1 second), or for a 17-second delay.
- Type 28B, 38 and 38A electric impact fuse, designed for use against shipping.

== Post-war unexploded bombs ==
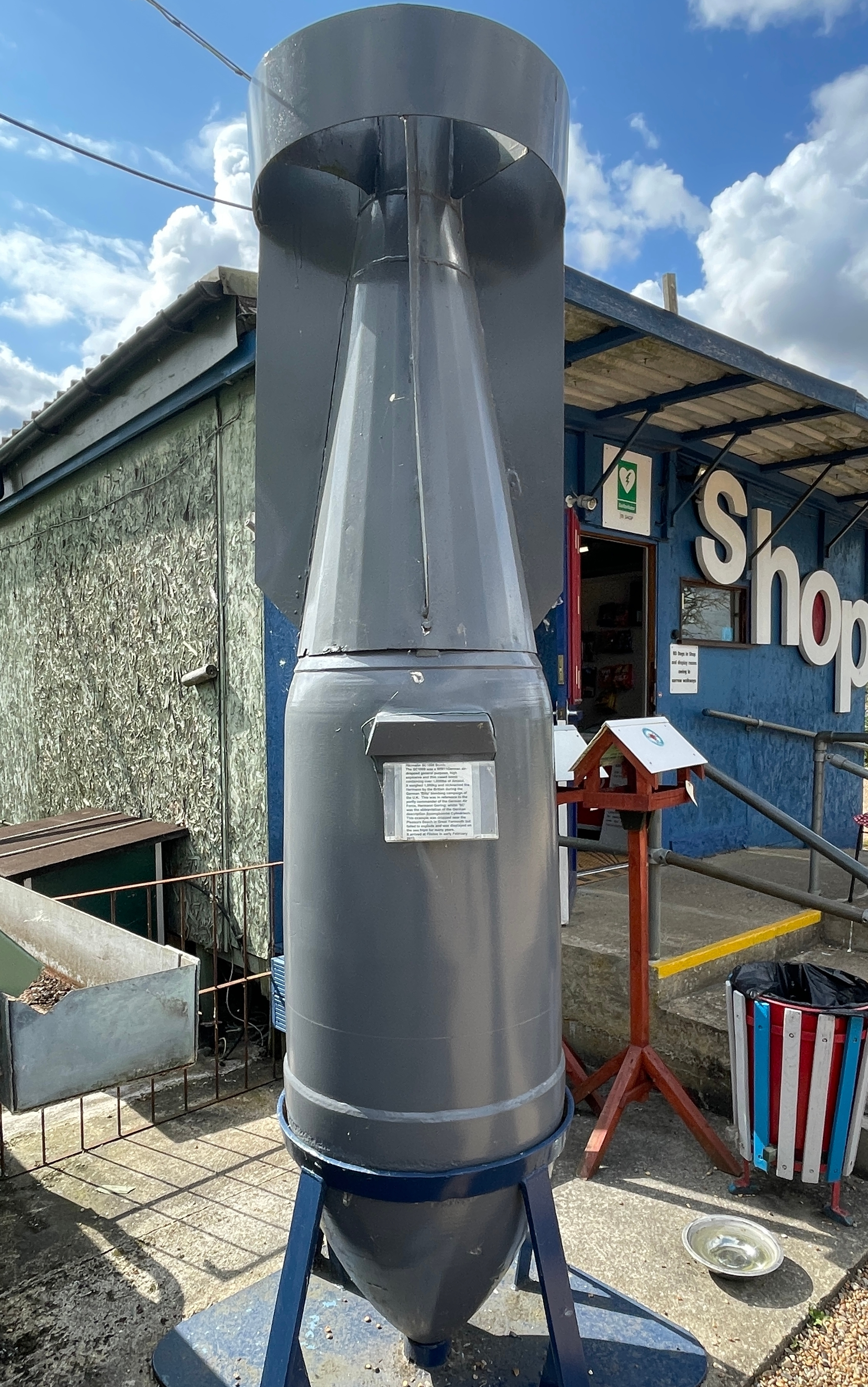
A SC1000 displayed at the Norfolk and Suffolk Aviation Museum, 2026. This bomb failed to detonate when dropped on Great Yarmouth during World War 2. After being made safe, it was on public display in the town for many years before being moved to the museum

Unexploded ordnance can pose a risk of explosion even after a century or more, and some can explode fully if disturbed or even spontaneously. Many unexploded devices from the Second World War are found until this day, including Hermann bombs in Europe, requiring evacuation of people nearby while they are dealt with. They must sometimes be destroyed by detonation if no safer way is possible, and may cause damage despite precautions.

=== London 2008 ===
In early June 2008 an SC 1000 bomb was dredged from the River Lea near Three Mills Island in London, the largest bomb found in 30 years. The explosive charge was liquefied and pumped out using steam by bomb disposal experts from the Royal Engineers, exposing the detonator, which was made safe with a small detonation after five days. The always-present risk of a full detonation was avoided.

=== Szczecin 2013 ===
In June 2013, an SC 1000 bomb was recovered from the Odra in central Szczecin, Poland. The area was evacuated while the bomb was lifted from the river by military engineers, and then taken in convoy to an Army training base near Drawsko Pomorskie to be destroyed in a controlled explosion.

=== Belgrade 2013 ===
In early December, an SC1000 bomb was recovered in the inner city of Belgrade. The area was evacuated while the bomb was lifted by the engineers of the Department for the Unexploded Ordnance of the Sector for Emergency Management of the Ministry of Interior, and then taken in a convoy to an Army training base at Nikinci to be destroyed in a controlled explosion.

=== Exeter 2021 ===
On 26 February 2021 an unexploded SC1000 bomb was found by builders near the University of Exeter in Exeter in the United Kingdom. A major incident was declared, residents were evacuated, a 400-meter evacuation zone was established, and a controlled detonation was performed on 27 February. Despite precautions, houses within 100m were damaged, a large crater was formed, and debris was thrown 250m away.

=== Hauerseter Leir 2022 ===
On 30 November 2022, an unexploded SC1000 bomb was found in a small lake near the Hauerseiter military barracks in Norway. It was found by use of a metal detector (the lake is known for containing miscellaneous artifacts from the past). The bomb was said to be in "pristine" condition due to preservation in a low-oxygen environment.

=== Rijeka 2023 ===
On 19 March 2023 the Croatian port city of Rijeka was partly evacuated and all marine traffic was halted while an SC1000 was dragged from the port to the middle of the Kvarner bay and safely detonated.

=== Portsmouth 2024 ===
On 3 December 2024, an unexploded SC1000 bomb was found on the Southsea Seafront of Portsmouth during sea-defence repair activities. The area was evacuated and the unexploded ordnance removed.

== See also ==
- List of weapons of military aircraft of Germany during World War II

== Photo gallery ==
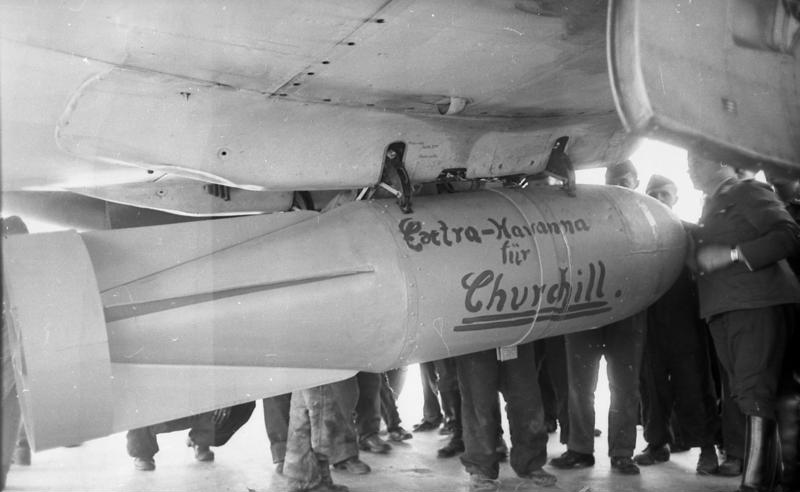
A SC 1000 with a personalized message for Mr. Churchill in Belgium 1940.

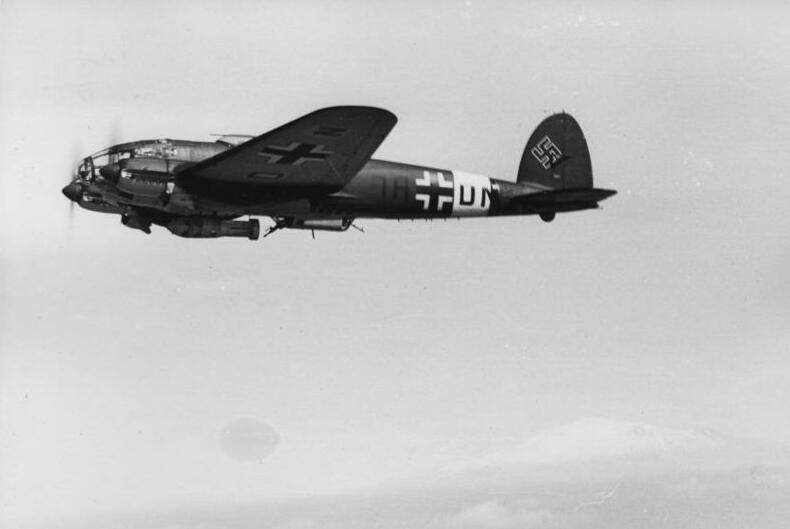
A Heinkel He 111 (code marking 1H DN) of KG 26 with an SC 1000 bomb suspended from its fuselage in March 1941.

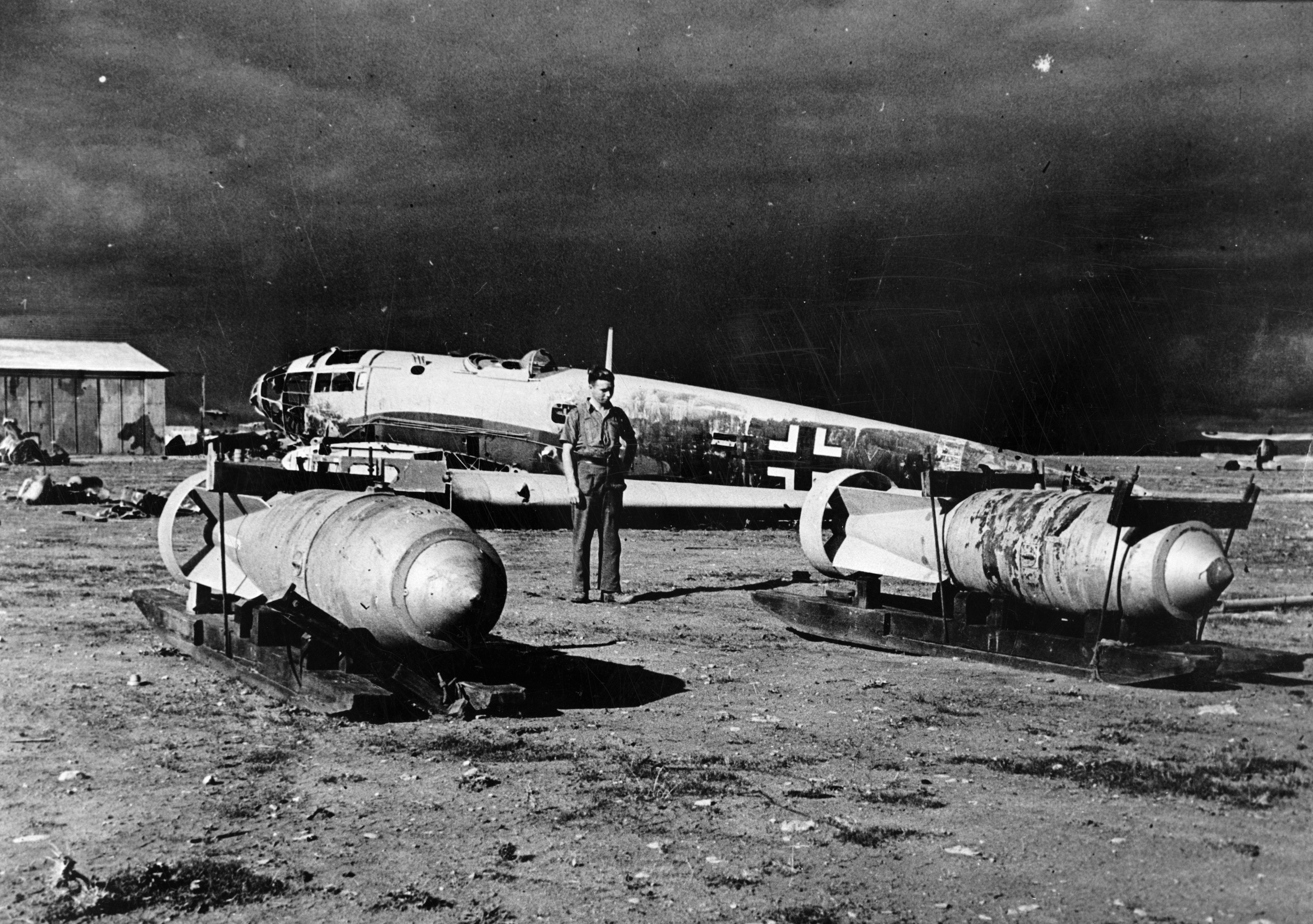
Two SC 1000 bombs with "kopfrings", stored on sledges in front of a wrecked German Heinkel He 111H bomber at Benghazi airfield Libya in early 1943.

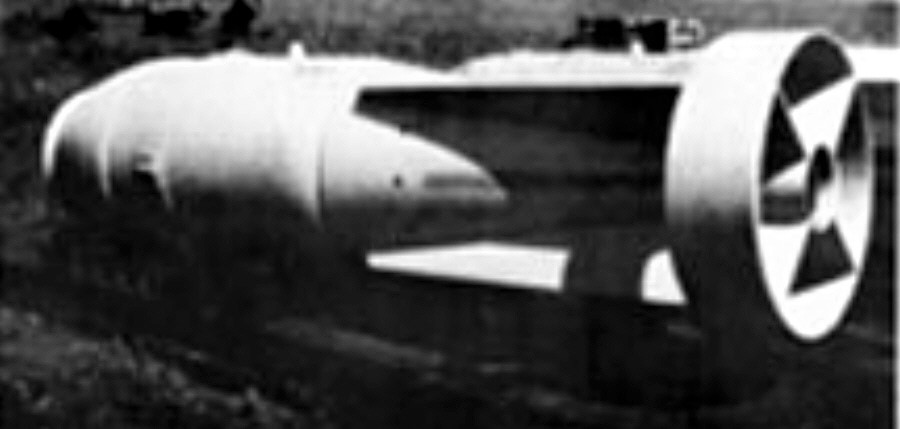
