= Aluminosis =

Occupational lung disease caused by inhalation of aluminum dust

- Other names: aluminium lung
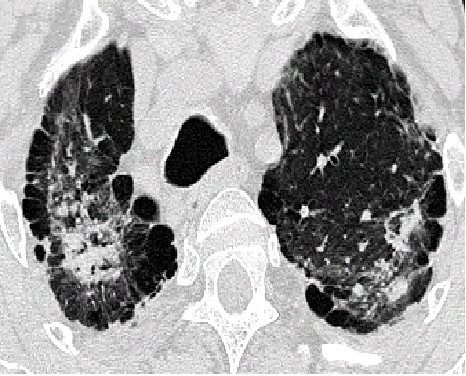
- HRCT-scan of severe aluminosis with subpleural bullae.
- Specialty: Pulmonology, Occupational medicine
- Types: Simple aluminosis; progressive massive fibrosis (PMF); acute aluminosis
- Causes: Inhalation of aluminium dust or aluminium oxide (Al₂O₃)
- Differential diagnosis: Silicosis, asbestosis, coal workers' pneumoconiosis

Aluminosis (also known as aluminium lung) is a restrictive lung disease caused by exposure to aluminum-bearing dust. Aluminosis is a form of pneumoconiosis that can lead to pulmonary fibrosis. First cases of lung damage from aluminium exposure were reported in the 1930s in Germany. It can be detected by using high-resolution computed tomography.

Findings may vary, showing nodular or slightly irregular opacities that may merge into more prominent forms, most frequently in the upper lung fields, sometimes in the lower lung fields, and less frequently a diffuse micro nodular pattern. In severe cases, pulmonary fibrosis with honeycombing was described.

Workers exposed to aluminium dust are often involved in industries such as explosives manufacturing where aluminium powder is involved, aluminium welding and grinding, and bauxite smelting.

== Signs and symptoms ==
The signs and symptoms of Aluminosis are generally non-specific and resemble those of other Pneumoconosis (e.g. silicosis), they can also vary depending on the extent of exposure and the duration over which it occurs. Symptoms and signs include:

- Dyspnea.
- Dry cough.
- Fatigue
- Chest tightness
- Reduced chest expansion on examination
- Fine crepitations on auscultation of the lung bases or upper zones in advanced fibrosis

In advanced cases, symptoms may also include:

- Cyanosis
- Cor pulmonale
- Respiratory failure
