= Trialen =

Explosive developed in Germany and used during World War II

Trialen was an explosive developed in Germany. It was used during World War II in the V-1 flying bomb and Arado E.377 glide bomb, among other weapons, as an enhanced blast explosive. Trialen was the German equivalent of the British explosive Torpex, though its production was hindered by a shortage of the aluminium powder that was added to increase its explosive power.

It comprised a mixture of TNT, hexogen, and aluminium powder in varying proportions for each of three versions, known as trialen (or filler) 105, 106 and 107 respectively. The proportions for each version were:

- Trialen 105: TNT 70%, hexogen 15%, aluminium powder 15%
- Trialen 106: TNT 50%, hexogen 25%, aluminium powder 25%
- Trialen 107: TNT 50%, hexogen 20%, aluminium powder 30% (Note: Fleischer gives this as 60% TNT, 20% aluminium.)
- Trialen 105/109: a mixture of 27% trialen 105 and 73% PMF 109. PMF 109 (Panzermunitionsfüllung 109) was a mixture consisting of 71% cyclonite, 25% aluminium powder and 4% montan wax. Though highly brisant and thermobaric, this mixture was infusible and quite impact sensitive, hence ill-suited for filling large caliber munitions. These drawbacks were overcome by the so-called Stuckfüllung, or "biscuit filling", method: the pulverulent PMF 109 mixture was compressed into small cylindrical, tablet-like pellets and these were poured into the munition body, the space between them being filled with molten fusible trialen 105; this method allowed the German munition factories to produce large, quasi homogeneous fillings containing a high proportion of cyclonite and hence high-energy output and brisance by a simple variant of the melt casting process, while simultaneously conserving the TNT needed to do so.
