= Aluminium powder =

Metal dust

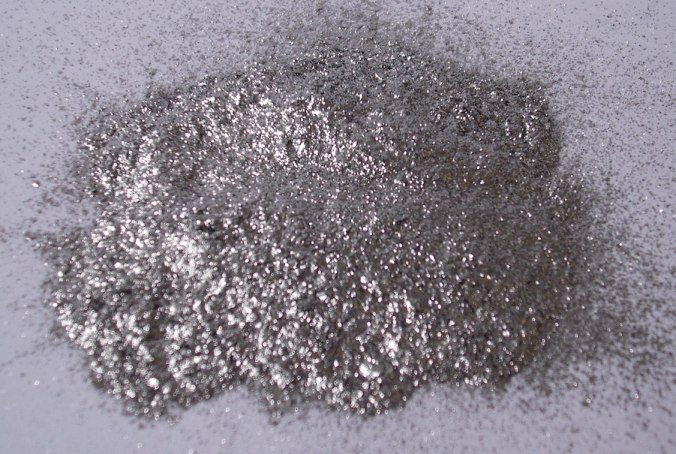
Aluminium pigment powder

Aluminium powder is powdered aluminium.

This was originally produced by mechanical means using a stamp mill to create flakes. Subsequently, a process of spraying molten aluminium to create a powder of droplets was developed by E. J. Hall in the 1920s. The resulting powder might then be processed further in a ball mill to flatten it into flakes for use as a coating or pigment. Aluminium powder features low density with high conductivity.

== Usage ==
- autoclave aerated concrete
- cosmetic colourant
- fingerprint powder
- metallic paint
- pyrotechnics (including the M-80 firecracker)
- refractory
- rocket and missile fuel such as the solid rocket boosters of the Space Shuttle and Aluminum-Ice Rocket Propellant (ALICE)
- thermite, a pyrotechnic composition of a metal powder and a metal oxide for brief very high temperature uses such as exothermic welding, pyrotechnics and weapons.
- Electrically conductive filler material for EMI shielding applications.
- Improvised explosive device

Depending on the usage, the powder is either coated or uncoated.

=== Aluminium granules ===
Aluminium granules are a larger particle size alternative to aluminium powders. There is no official size range for granules vs. powders with sources describing granules with particle sizes anywhere from 0.1-40 mm. Granules are useful as they maintain the free-flowing nature of powders but have lower surface area decreasing explosion risk.

== Safety ==
Aluminium is insoluble. Although aluminium is unlikely to be adsorbed into the blood stream, its inhalation can cause severe irritation and hinder the ventilation mechanism. High levels of exposure over many years may result in aluminosis which causes pulmonary fibrosis.

Aluminium powder and dust is highly flammable and creates a significant risk of fire or explosion. There have been many accidents in industries which produce such dusts and powders.

== See also ==
- Metal powder

=== Additive manufacturing ===
Gas-atomized spherical aluminium alloy powders are widely used in laser powder bed fusion (LPBF) for lightweight structural components in the aerospace and automotive industries. The most common alloy is AlSi10Mg, valued for its combination of low density, good castability, and hardenability. AlSi7Mg is also used for applications requiring higher ductility and corrosion resistance. High-strength aluminium alloy powders such as Scalmalloy (Al-Mg-Sc-Zr) are employed where elevated temperature performance is needed. Because conventional high-strength wrought aluminium alloys of the 2000 and 7000 series are prone to hot cracking during laser powder bed fusion, heat-resistant aluminium powders for additive manufacturing are typically based on specially designed chemistries: scandium- and zirconium-bearing alloys such as Scalmalloy rely on coherent Al3(Sc,Zr) precipitates for strength retention at elevated temperature, while Al-Ce and Al-Fe based alloys offer alternative routes to high-temperature strength at lower raw-material cost. A review of traditional and laser-powder-bed-fusion processing of aluminium alloys concluded that the achievable mechanical properties, microstructure and cost are governed by the alloy chemistry together with the process parameters and post-build heat treatment.
