= BAPI =

Brazilian anti-runway penetration bomb

BAPI (Bomba Anti-Pista)
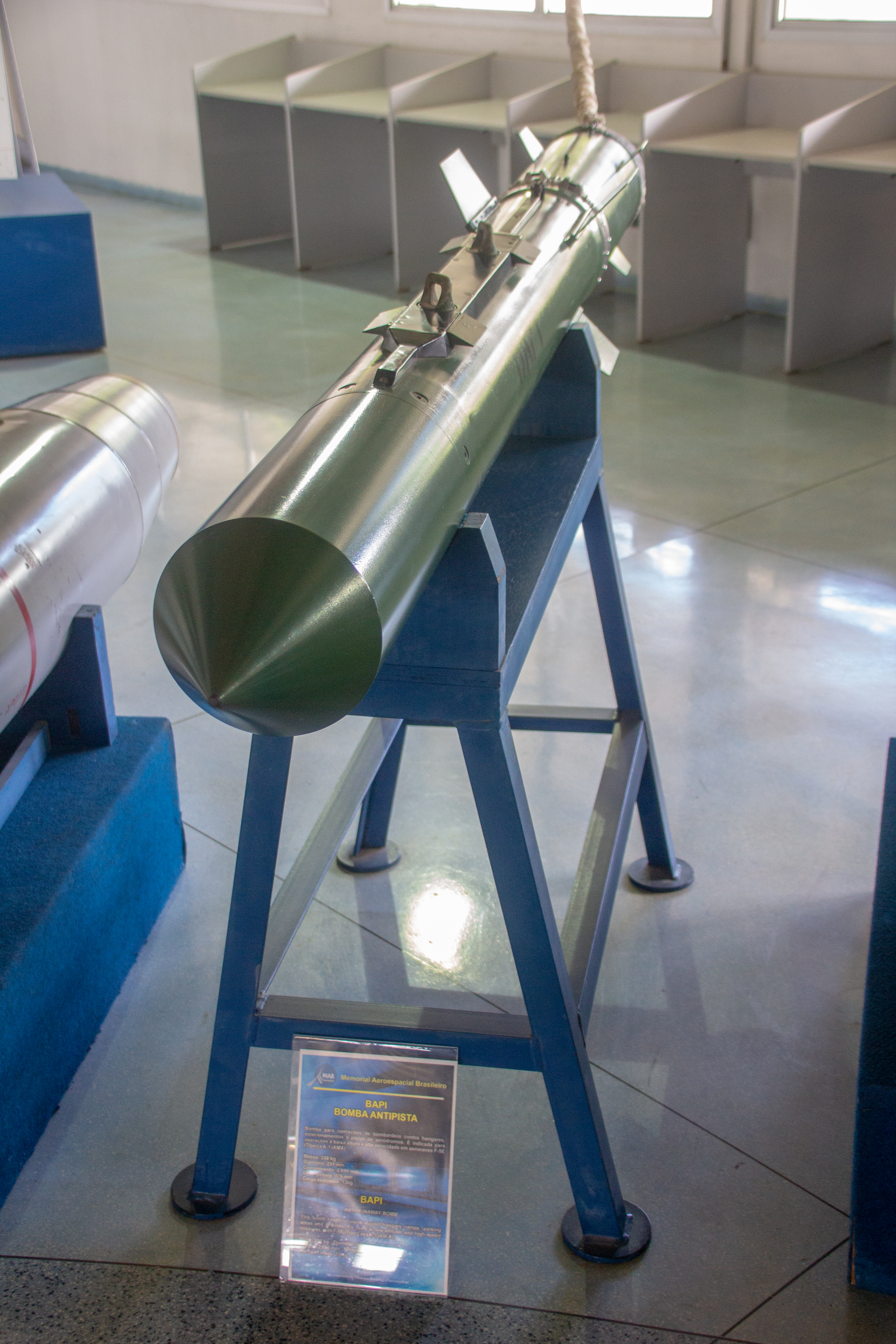
- BAPI on display in 2019 at the Memorial Aeroespacial Brasileiro in São José dos Campos, Brazil. The label beneath the bomb reads "BAPI" and "BOMBA ANTIPISTA".
- Type: Anti-runway penetration bomb
- Place of origin: Brazil

Service history
- Used by: Brazilian Air Force

Production history
- Designer: CTA / IAE; Bernardini
- Designed: April 1987 (project start)

Specifications (BAPI)
- Mass: 238 kg (525 lb) (Note: The May 1989 report in International Defense Review describes BAPI as a 200 kg weapon.)
- Length: 2.69 m (8 ft 10 in)
- Diameter: 231 mm (9.1 in)
- Filling: Explosive charge
- Filling weight: 13 kg (29 lb)
- Detonation mechanism: Delayed detonation (proposed 1989 design)

BAPI (an acronym for the Portuguese name Bomba Anti-Pista) is a Brazilian anti-runway penetration bomb, primarily intended to disable runways. Other targets include taxiways, aircraft parking areas, and hangars. Development of the weapon began in 1987 at the Divisão de Sistemas Bélicos of the then Instituto de Atividades Espaciais (IAE), which operated within the Centro Técnico Aeroespacial (CTA).

The weapon was developed for the Brazilian Air Force (FAB). Bernardini collaborated with CTA on the project, according to a report published in May 1989. The 1989 proposal called for the bomb to be released at low altitude and high speed, with parachute braking followed by ignition of a rocket motor to accelerate it towards the target. Delayed detonation after penetration of the concrete was intended to create a crater and damage the runway structure. Several design features were based on the French Matra Durandal bomb. The Brazilian Air Force’s A-1/AMX and F-5 aircraft are equipped to carry BAPI bombs.

Other weapons intended for attacks on airfield runways include the French Durandal (designated BLU-107/B in U.S. service) and BAP 100, the British JP233, the American CBU-98/B project, the Russian BETAB-500 and its BETAB-500ShP variant, and the Indian DRDO SAAW. BAPI, like the Durandal, was designed as a single penetration bomb. Instead of a single bomb, JP233 delivered submunitions from dispensers. A dispenser carrying submunitions was also planned for the CBU-98/B. SAAW was designed for stand-off attacks using precision guidance.

== Development and testing ==
Work on BAPI began in April 1987 at the Divisão de Sistemas Bélicos (ESB) of the Instituto de Atividades Espaciais (IAE), within the Centro Técnico Aeroespacial (CTA). The division was established in 1976 and developed aircraft weapons in Brazil for the Brazilian Air Force. The first group of conventional weapons developed in Brazil for the AMX programme included an anti-runway bomb, retarded bombs, grenade-dispensing bombs and incendiary bombs.

In 1985, BAPI was among the first four weapons given development priority in the Brazilian Air Force's AMX planning list.

According to a May 1989 report in International Defense Review, Bernardini developed BAPI in collaboration with CTA. The report also mentioned that deliveries to the Brazilian Air Force had already begun and that the weapon was being offered for export. A December 1989 report on the Brazilian defence industry also mentioned BAPI as one of Bernardini's products.

Brazil's Ministry of Aeronautics included a wholly domestic anti-runway bomb in its weapons-systems research and development programme. Compatibility with the AT-26, F-5, F-103 and AM-X aircraft was a requirement of the 1989 BAPI design. In a 2004 parliamentary speech, the anti-runway bomb was identified as one of CTA's projects for homologation and qualification on F-5 aircraft.

A smaller, cheaper bomb (BAPI-100) was proposed in 1989. Inspired by the French BAP 100, it was intended to complement the BAPI in attacking roads, bridges, fortifications, and runways. The proposed size and weight were smaller, with the body diameter roughly half that of the BAPI and the total weight about one-fifth.

IAE commenced phase 2 of its weapons development in 1985. In this phase, they used their own engineering designs for several systems, including the anti-runway bomb. The LAME (Laboratory of Energetic Materials) also worked on the BAPI.

The performance figures published in 1989 came from computer simulations and monorail tests at CTA. For a reinforced concrete runway 40 cm (16 in) thick, the figures indicated a crater approximately 5 m (16 ft) across and 2 m (6.6 ft) deep. The adjacent concrete slabs were expected to be lifted and the slabs were expected to be weakened, with fragments spread over an area of c. 150 to 200 m^{2} (1,600 to 2,200 sq ft).

Development and certification work on BAPI included flight testing. IAE documentation archived in August 2004 described BAPI as a developed and homologated product.

The present IAE has its origins in the Instituto de Pesquisas e Desenvolvimento (IPD), established in 1954 at the then Centro Técnico de Aeronáutica. In 1991, IPD and the Instituto de Atividades Espaciais merged to form the present Instituto de Aeronáutica e Espaço (IAE), with a mission of aerospace research and development.

== Design and operation ==
Reinforced-concrete runways were the principal target of BAPI's 1989 design for attack on hardened airfield surfaces. The published BAPI release parameters state an altitude of approximately 100 m (330 ft) and speeds of 360–520 knots. Low-level delivery was intended to surprise the enemy's air defences. The two-stage parachute system was designed to slow the bomb and limit the shock of parachute deployment, allowing the launching aircraft to escape safely. The bomb comprises a warhead, a control system, fuzing components, a rocket motor and a parachute braking system.

According to the May 1989 International Defense Review report, an electronic sequencer would control the bomb's operation once released. A small drogue parachute would deploy first; then the main parachute would slow the bomb and make its descent closer to vertical. The main parachute would then be released, and the rocket motor ignited to accelerate the bomb towards the target before impact. The delayed detonation in the 1989 design was intended to let the warhead penetrate the concrete before exploding underneath. The published specifications give an explosive charge of 13 kg (29 lb).

== Aircraft compatibility ==
Brazilian Air Force AMX A-1M at the Academia da Força Aérea in 2015

A photograph published in May 1989 shows a bomb mounted on a Brazilian Air Force F-5. Its caption identifies the bomb as a Bernardini BAPI. The F-5EM air-to-ground load diagram shows BAPI at the centreline station beneath the fuselage. (Note: BAPI is labelled G8 in the air-to-ground armament illustration on printed page 175. The authors caution that load combinations depend on the mission, operating conditions and aerodynamic constraints.) Both the single-seat F-5E/EM and two-seat F-5F/FM variants of the F-5 in Brazilian Air Force service have BAPI listed among their armament options.

According to Tecnologia & Defesa, the bomb was used for anti-runway attacks on non-modernised AMX variants as part of the aircraft's conventional armament. The armament options documented by the Brazilian Air Force Academy for the A-1/AMX include BAPI alongside general-purpose, fragmentation, incendiary and guided bombs. A 2025 article in Revista Sociedade Militar also lists BAPI among the modernised A-1M's armament. Alongside an anti-runway bomb, the AMX's conventional weapon options include Mk-series bombs, the BINC-300 incendiary bomb and BLG-252 cluster munitions.

EEAR instructional material states that BAPI may be employed by F-5M and A-1 aircraft in low-altitude, high-speed anti-airfield bombing.

== Purpose and intended targets ==
In 1989, José Alberto Fernandes Ferreira argued in Revista da UNIFA that hardened airfields and improved air defences created a need for a weapon like the BAPI. To attack concrete-protected targets with conventional weapons, heavy bombs would be dropped in medium or steep dives. This would expose the aircraft to defensive fire. The whole point of the BAPI was to render enemy air power on the ground inoperative for a few hours or several days by making the runways unusable.

Intended targets include hangars, aircraft parking areas and airfield runways. The resulting craters can affect the subgrade under the pavement.

== Characteristics ==
The bomb has an elongated, aerodynamic body with a small diameter. EEAR instructional material classifies it as a special-purpose bomb: its control component distinguishes it from unguided bombs, but does not provide the degree of precision associated with guided weapons.

A steel penetrator and a rocket motor using hydroxyl-terminated polybutadiene (HTPB) featured in the configuration described in 1989. Development-stage figures from that year give an impact mass of 150 kg (330 lb) and an impact velocity of 250 m/s (820 ft/s).

=== Technical data ===
The EEAR instructional material provides physical dimensions and release parameters which are different from those in the 1989 BAPI development-stage proposal. The IAE specifications as archived in 2004 and 2007 describe a weapon of 2.69 m (8 ft 10 in) length, 238 kg (525 lb) in weight, 231 mm (9.1 in) in body diameter and with a release speed range of 360–520 knots. The 2001 specifications (as archived) are in agreement on length, body diameter and total mass, but specify an explosive charge of 15 kg (33 lb) and a span of 479 mm (18.9 in). The 2004 and 2007 specifications instead have on explosive charge of 13 kg (29 lb) and a span of 497 mm (19.6 in).

==== Data summary ====
General characteristics of the BAPI
Characteristic	Value	Notes
Type	Anti-runway penetration bomb	Special-purpose anti-runway bomb, classified separately from unguided bombs and guided weapons.
Place of origin	Brazil	Developed under CTA / IAE. The Laboratory of Energetic Materials (LAME), part of IAE, contributed to the development work.
Length	2.69 m (8 ft 10 in)	The IAE specifications archived in 2001 give the same overall length.
Body diameter	231 mm (9.1 in)	The IAE specifications archived in 2001 and 2007 both list a body diameter of 231 mm (9.1 in).
Body form	Narrow, elongated and aerodynamic	Portal Defesa describes the bomb as having a small diameter (diâmetro pequeno). It describes the body as an elongated aerodynamic body (corpo aerodinâmico alongado).
Wingspan / fin span	497 mm (19.6 in)	The 2004 and 2007 IAE snapshots give 497 mm (19.6 in); the 2001 snapshot gives 479 mm (18.9 in).
Total mass	238 kg (525 lb)	A total mass of 238 kg (525 lb) also appears in the IAE specifications archived in 2001.
Explosive charge	13 kg (29 lb)	Term used in the source: carga explosiva ("explosive charge"). The 2004 and 2007 IAE snapshots give 13 kg (29 lb); the 2001 snapshot gives 15 kg (33 lb).
Components	Warhead, control system, fuzing components, rocket motor and parachute braking system	Control and fuzing are identified as separate parts of the bomb.
Propulsion	Rocket motor	Rocket acceleration follows parachute braking and release of the main parachute in the 1989 operating sequence.
Attack sequence	Proposed 1989 sequence: parachute braking, rocket acceleration, penetration and delayed detonation	Detonation was intended to occur beneath the concrete surface, damaging the runway pavement structure.
Launch speed	360–520 knots	The specified range refers to the bomb's speed at release from the aircraft.
Launch altitude	About 100 m (330 ft)	Release height for the low-altitude, high-speed anti-airfield bombing profile.
Crater depth	1.5–2 m (4.9–6.6 ft)	Crater depth describes the cavity left by detonation; concrete penetration describes the thickness pierced before the explosion.
Crater diameter	5–7 m (16–23 ft)	The diameter describes the crater opening; the wider affected area includes damaged or displaced concrete around it.
Intended targets	Hangars, aircraft parking areas and airfield runways	The published target list covers runways as well as hangars and aircraft parking areas.
Aircraft listed in sources	F-5EM; A-1/AMX; A-1M	On the F-5EM load diagram, the bomb occupies the centreline station beneath the fuselage. The official A-1/AMX armament list also includes BAPI.

== Comparison with similar weapons ==
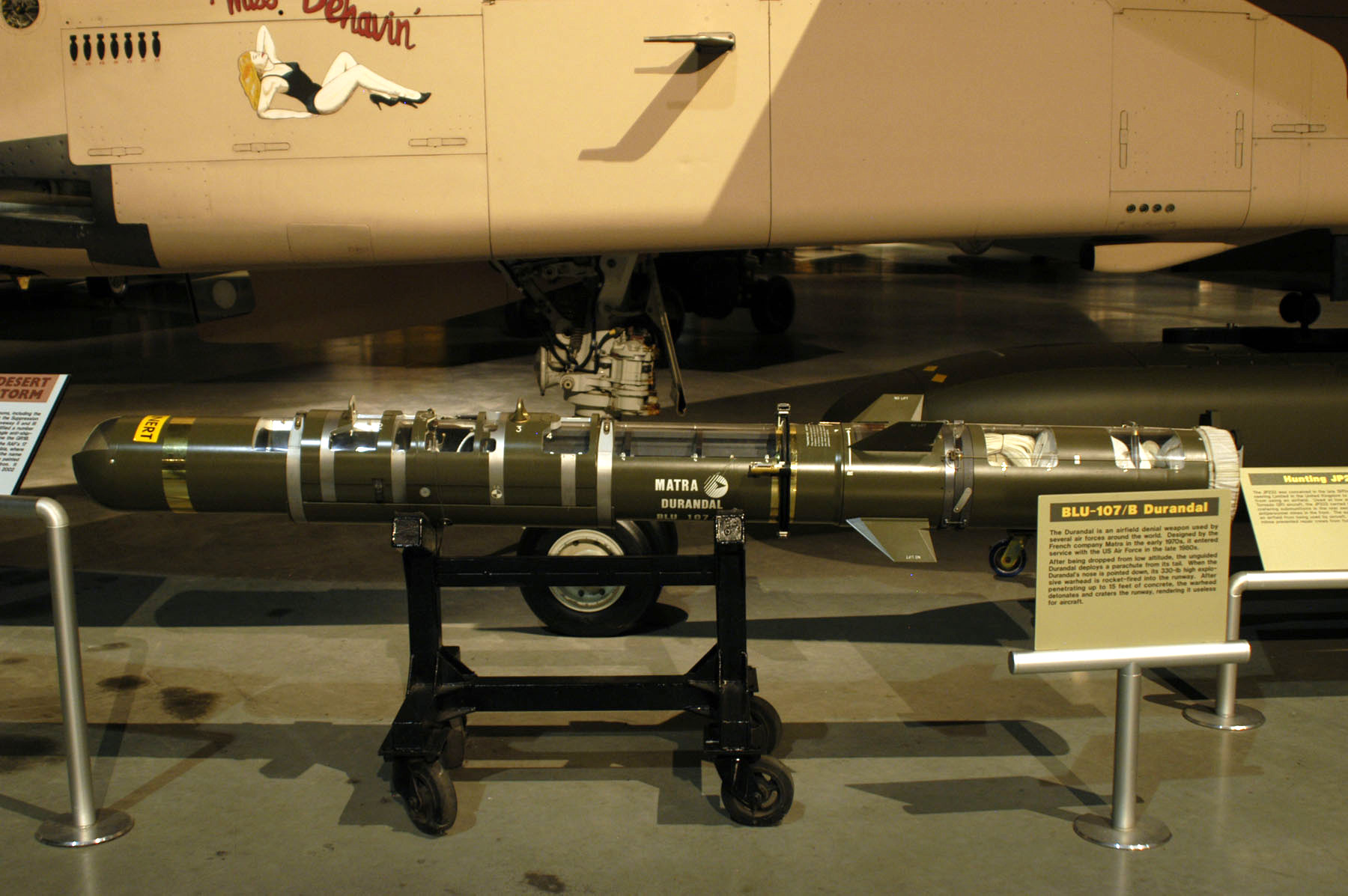
BLU-107/B Durandal on display at the National Museum of the U.S. Air Force; a French anti-runway weapon shown for comparison with BAPI.

Like BAPI, the French Matra Durandal and BAP 100 were anti-runway weapons designed to disrupt airfield operations. The British JP233 was a combination of runway damage and the dispersion of mines to hinder repair operations.

A 'dibber' is a weapon designed to penetrate a concrete runway before it explodes. . That was the plan in the 1989 BAPI proposal (detonation to follow penetration of the runway surface).

=== BAPI and Durandal ===
Matra and SAMP developed the French Durandal as an anti-runway penetration bomb for low-level attack on airfields in the early to mid-1970s. Production started in 1977. As with Durandal, the 1989 BAPI proposal was for low-level delivery of a single penetration bomb. The idea was that it would penetrate the concrete and then detonate underneath it to lift the slabs.

In Ferreira's 1989 UNIFA comparison, the masses listed were 195 kg (430 lb) for Durandal and 200 kg (440 lb) for the BAPI design, both with 15 kg (33 lb) of explosive and 40 cm (16 in) of concrete penetration. The BAPI figures were based on computer simulations and monorail testing at CTA. The IAE specs as archived in 2007 give different values for total mass and explosive charge.

=== BAPI and JP233 ===
During a low-level pass over the airfield, the JP233 dispenser was intended to release 30 runway-cratering submunitions and 215 area-denial mines. The submunitions were intended to crater the runway and the mines to impede repair work. BAPI's 1989 proposal instead called for a single penetration bomb.

In NATO planning for a potential war in Central Europe, low-level runway denial was regarded as a vital task. For the RAF in the 1991 Gulf War, low-level delivery promised greater accuracy than loft bombing with unguided ordnance, but exposed aircraft and aircrew to significant risks from air defences. In the Kuwaiti theatre, portable surface-to-air missiles and rapid-firing light anti-aircraft guns limited low-altitude operations.

=== BAPI and CBU-98/B ===
The American CBU-98/B design called for an SUU-64/B tactical munitions dispenser carrying multiple BLU-106/B penetrators, rather than the single penetration bomb proposed for BAPI in 1989. The Direct Airfield Attack Combined Munition (DAACM) design combined eight Boosted Kinetic Energy Penetrators with 24 HB876 area-denial mines of the type used in the JP233.

In 1986, the United States Air Force regarded Durandal as an interim weapon pending its replacement by DAACM. The DAACM programme was reported in 2003 to have been suspended in 1993.

=== BAPI and BAP 100 ===
The French BAP 100 was a smaller rocket-assisted anti-runway bomb carried in groups of nine or 18 on a multi-store adapter. Each of these BAP 100 munitions had a penetrating warhead, a rocket booster and a braking parachute. Detonation after penetration of the pavement was intended to fracture and heave the runway surface.

For the French BAP 100, the 1989 comparison used a mass of 36 kg (79 lb) and an explosive charge of 3.5 kg (7.7 lb), against 200 kg (440 lb) and 15 kg (33 lb) respectively for the BAPI design. A different BAP 100 launch weight of 32.5 kg (72 lb) was published in 2009.

=== BAPI and SAAW ===
Low-altitude release was proposed for BAPI in 1989, whereas the Indian SAAW is a 125 kg (276 lb) precision anti-airfield weapon intended for stand-off release, with INS/GPS guidance and seeker variants. Its published stand-off range is up to 90–100 km (56–62 mi), depending on release conditions. Accuracy figures published by Bharat Dynamics are less than 7 m (23 ft) with IN-GPS and less than 3 m (9.8 ft) with a seeker.

During flight trials from Indian Air Force aircraft at Chandipur, Odisha, SAAW reached targets more than 70 km (43 mi) away using a precision navigation system. Three tests involving different release conditions and ranges were reported as successful on 3 November 2017.

=== Technical comparison ===
Selected anti-runway and anti-airfield weapons
Weapon	Country of origin	Type	Guidance	Approximate mass (Note: Masses are for the complete weapon, dispenser, or individual submunition in each entry.)	Delivery / attack concept	Notes
BAPI	Brazil	Anti-runway penetration bomb	Special purpose bomb; the control unit lacks the accuracy of a guided weapon.	238 kg (525 lb)	Low altitude, high speed delivery of a single Rocket Assisted Penetration Bomb. Proposed in 1989.	Listed as an option for the F-5EM and A-1/AMX airframes. BAPI is also listed for the upgraded A-1M in Revista Sociedade Militar (2025).
Matra Durandal	France	Anti-runway penetration bomb	Unguided	195 kg (430 lb)	Low altitude release, parachute to slow the bomb down, then a rocket motor to drive it into the runway.	Stated to be capable of destroying some 150–200 m^{2} (1,600–2,200 sq ft) of concrete runway.
JP233	United Kingdom	Airfield-denial submunition dispenser	Unguided submunitions	Refers to the dispenser system (not an individual bomb).	low level pass over the airfield to scatter the runway cratering submunitions and area-denial mines.	In RAF service, JP233 carried 30 runway-cratering submunitions and 215 area-denial / anti-personnel mines.
CBU-98/B	United States	Planned anti-airfield cluster munition	Unguided BKEP penetrators	About 386 kg (850 lb) for the prototype (MAPS Air Museum description).	Dispenser for distributing runway penetrating submunitions and area-denial mines.	The DAACM design had eight BLU-106/B penetrators and 24 HB876 mines in an SUU-64/B dispenser. The programme was reportedly suspended in 1993.
BAP 100	France	Anti-runway submunition, carried in groups on a multi-store adapter.	Not given in the 2009 Forecast International report.	About 32.5 kg (72 lb) per submunition	Multi-store adapters carry either 9 or 18 rocket assisted munitions. The 18-bomb load is released in succession over about 450 m (1,480 ft).	Detonation after penetration fractures and heaves the runway surface.
BETAB-500	Russia	Concrete-piercing bomb for use against hardened targets and airfield runways.	Unguided	477 kg (1,052 lb)	Air-dropped penetration bomb with a release altitude range of 30–5,000 m (98–16,404 ft) and release speeds of 600–1,200 km/h (370–750 mph).	Claimed penetration of 1 m (3.3 ft) of reinforced concrete covered by up to 3 m (9.8 ft) of soil. The explosive rating is listed as 98 kg (216 lb) TNT equivalent.
DRDO SAAW	India	Stand-off precision anti-airfield weapon	INS/GPS and seeker variants	125 kg (276 lb)	Precision air-to-surface weapon released from a fighter aircraft for stand-off attack.	Range of up to 90–100 km (56–62 mi), depending on release conditions as per Bharat Dynamics.

== See also ==
- Matra Durandal – French anti-runway bomb
- CBU-98/B – American anti-airfield cluster munition (DAACM)
- DRDO SAAW – Indian precision-guided anti-airfield weapon
- JP233 – British runway-denial system
- BAP 100 – smaller French anti-runway bomb adopted by the French Air Force
- BETAB-500 – Russian concrete-piercing bomb
- MW-1 – German submunition dispenser capable of carrying STABO anti-runway submunitions
