= List of cluster bombs =

This is a list of cluster bombs as of 2008.

== Brazil ==
- BLG-120
- BLG-204
- BLG-252

== France ==
- BAP 100
- BLG 66 Belouga

== Germany ==
- AB 23
- AB 250-2
- AB 70-D1
- BDC 10

== Israel ==
- TAL 1
- TAL 2

== Poland ==
- ZK-300
- LBKas-250

== South Africa ==
- CB-470 Cluster Bomb dispenser
- Alpha Bomb

== Soviet Union ==
- RRAB-3 "Molotov bread basket"
- RBK-250
- RBK-500
- RBK-750

== United Kingdom ==
- JP233
- BL755

== United States ==
- CBU-2
- CBU-3
- CBU-7
- CBU-12
- CBU-14
- CBU-22
- CBU-24
- CBU-25
- CBU-28
- CBU-29
- CBU-30
- CBU-33
- CBU-34
- CBU-38
- CBU-42 (Paired with CBU-34)
- CBU-46
- CBU-49
- CBU-52
- CBU-54
- CBU-55
- CBU-58
- CBU-59
- CBU-60
- CBU-63
- CBU-70
- CBU-71
- CBU-71A/B
- CBU-72
- CBU-75 Sadeye
- CBU-76
- CBU-77
- CBU-78 Gator
- CBU-81
- CBU-87 CEM
- CBU-89 Gator
- CBU-94
- CBU-97 Sensor Fuse Weapon (SFW)
- CBU-98
- CBU-98/B (DAACM)
- CBU-99 Rockeye II
- CBU-100 Rockeye II
- CBU-105
- CBU-107 Passive Attack Weapon (PAW)
- MK15
- Mk 20 Rockeye II
- MK22
- M29
