= Bapi =

Bapi or BAPI may refer to:

== People ==
- Bapi Debnath, Professional Graphic Designer Of Bangladesh
- Bapi Das Baul, Baul performer of Bengali mystical folk music
- Bapi Bose (1909–1977), Indian cricketer
- Bapi–Tutul, one member of the Hindi film singer-songwriter duo

== BAPI ==
- Business Application Programming Interface, used to connect SAP
- Punta Indio Naval Air Base Argentine Navy identifier (Spanish: Base Aeronaval Punta Indio)
- BAPI (bomb) - see List of modern weapons of the Brazilian Air Force

== Other uses ==
- "Bapi", nickname for bapineuzumab, an antibody

== See also ==
- Bappi Lahiri, Indian music composer, music director, singer, actor and record producer
- Bappy Chowdhury (fl. 2012–present), Bangladeshi film actor
