= List of modern weapons of the Brazilian Air Force =

List of modern weapons of the Brazilian Air Force is a list of in service and active weapon systems of the Brazilian Air Force.

== Surface-to-air missile ==
SAM system
Russia	9K38 Igla	SA-18; Igla S	Operational range: 6 km

== Anti-tank missiles ==
Anti-tank missiles
Russia	9M120 Ataka-V	used in AH-2 Sabre	Operational range: 6 km
Russia	9K114 Shturm	used in AH-2 Sabre	Operational range: 5 km

== Anti-ship missiles ==
Anti-ship missiles
United States	AGM-84 Harpoon	used in P-3AM	Operational range: 130/140 km

== Anti-radiation missile ==
Anti-radiation missile
Brazil	MAR-1	used in AMX A-1M	Operational range: ~100 km

== Targeting pod ==
Targeting
Israel	Litening III	used in AMX A-1M, F-5M and KC-390

== Cruise missile ==
Cruise missile
Brazil	MICLA-BR	Operational range: +300 km	used in F-39E/F Gripen (in testing phase - in the future)	-

== Air to air missile ==
Air to air missile
Brazil	MAA-1A Piranha	Infrared homing Short-range	used in F-5M Tiger II, AMX A-1M and A-29 Super Tucano	Operational range: 8 km
Brazil	MAA-1B Piranha	Infrared homing Short-range	used in F-5M Tiger II, AMX A-1M and A-29 Super Tucano	Operational range: ~10 km
Brazil South Africa	A-Darter	Infrared homing Short-range	used in F-5M Tiger II and F-39E/F Gripen	Operational range: 22 km
Israel	Python-3	Infrared homing Short-range	used in F-5M Tiger II	Operational range: 15 km
Israel	Python-4	Infrared homing Short-range	used in F-5M Tiger II	Operational range: 15 km
Germany	IRIS-T	Infrared homing Short-range	used in F-39E/F Gripen	Operational range: 30 km
Israel	Derby	Beyond-visual-range missile	used in F-5M Tiger II	Operational range: +50 km
France	Meteor	Beyond-visual-range missile	used in F-39E/F Gripen	Operational range: 200 km

== Bombs ==
Bombs
Brazil	Trocano	Thermobaric weapon	used in C-130 and KC-390
Brazil	BLG-120	Cluster munition	used in AT-27 Tucano, AMX A-1M, F-5M Tiger II and A-29 Super Tucano
Brazil	BLG-252	Cluster munition	used in AT-27 Tucano, AMX A-1M, F-5M Tiger II and A-29 Super Tucano
Brazil	BINC-300	Napalm	used in AMX A-1M, F-5M Tiger II and A-29 Super Tucano
Brazil	BINC-200	Napalm	used in AMX A-1M, F-5M Tiger II and A-29 Super Tucano
Brazil	BAFG-120/230	General-purpose bomb	used in AMX A-1M, F-5M Tiger II and A-29 Super Tucano
Israel	Elbit Lizard	Guided bomb	used in AMX A-1M and F-5M Tiger II
Brazil	SMKB	Guided bomb	used in AMX A-1M and F-5M Tiger II
United States	Mark 81	Unguided bomb	used in AT-27 Tucano, F-5M Tiger II and P-3AM
United States	Mark 82	General-purpose bomb	used in AMX A-1M, F-5M Tiger II, A-29 Super Tucano, AT-27 Tucano and P-3AM
United States	Mark 83	General-purpose bomb	used in AMX A-1M, F-5M Tiger II and P-3AM
United States	Mark 84	General-purpose bomb	used in AMX A-1M, F-5M Tiger II, JAS 39 Gripen and P-3AM
Brazil	BAPI	Unguided bomb Bunker buster	used in AMX A-1M and F-5M Tiger II
Israel	Spice 250	Guided bomb	used in F-39E/F Gripen
Israel	Spice 1000	Guided bomb Bunker buster	used in F-39E/F Gripen

== Rockets ==
Rockets
Russia	S-8 rocket	used in AH-2 Sabre
Brazil	SKYFIRE	used in AT-27 Tucano, A-29 Super Tucano, AMX A-1M and F-5M Tiger II
Brazil	SBAT-70	used in AT-27 Tucano, A-29 Super Tucano, AMX A-1M, F-5M Tiger II, P-95A/B Bandeirulha, UH-1H and H-50 Squirrel
Brazil	SBAT-127	used in AT-27 Tucano, A-29 Super Tucano, AMX A-1M, F-5M Tiger II, P-95A/B Bandeirulha, UH-1H and H-50 Squirrel

== Torpedoes ==
Torpedoes
United States	Mark 46 torpedo	used in P-3AM

== Automatic cannons ==
Automatic cannons
France	Bernardini Mk-164	used in AMX A-1
United States	M39 cannon	used in F-5 Tiger II
Germany	Mauser BK-27	used in JAS 39 Gripen

== Machine guns ==
Machine guns
United States	FN Herstal M3P	used in AT-27 Tucano and A-29 Super Tucano
United States	Minigun	used in H-60L Black Hawk
Belgium	FN MAG	used in UH-1H, H-50 Squirrel, H-34 Super Puma and H-36 Caracal

== See also ==
- List of active Brazilian military aircraft
