= M29 =

M29 or M-29 may refer to:

- M29 cluster bomb, a World War II era cluster bomb
- M29 mortar, an 81 millimeter calibre mortar
- M29 Weasel, a United States Army tracked vehicle used in World War II
- M29-class monitor, a class of Royal Navy warships
- M29 highway (Russia), a road connecting Krasnodar to Chechnya and Dagestan
- M-29 Davy Crockett Weapon System, a nuclear weapon
- M-29 (Michigan highway), a state highway in Michigan
- M2-9, a planetary nebula located in the constellation Ophiuchus
- Highway M29 (Ukraine), a highway in Ukraine
- M29 (Cape Town), a Metropolitan Route in Cape Town, South Africa
- M29 (Pretoria), a Metropolitan Route in Pretoria, South Africa
- M29 (Durban), a Metropolitan Route in Durban, South Africa
- XM29 OICW, a modern prototype rifle that fired 27 mm HE air bursting projectiles
- Messier 29 (M29), an open star cluster in the constellation Cygnus
- Smith & Wesson Model 29 (S&W M29), a six shot .44 Magnum revolver
- McLaren M29, a Formula One racing car
