= Ouadi Doum airstrike =

Air raid by French aircraft on 16 February 1986

Coordinates: 18.528445°N 20.18888°E

- Part of the Chadian–Libyan War
- French bombs hit the runway at Ouadi Doum.
| Date | 16 February 1986 |
| Location | Ouadi Doum, Chad |
| Result | French Victory; Airport rendered unusable |

Belligerents
| (History of Libya under Muammar Gaddafi) Libya | France |

Commanders and leaders
| | General Jean-Jacques Brun |

Units involved
| | French Air Force |

Strength
| 2K12 Kub SAMs (offline) | 11 SEPECAT Jaguar A 4 Mirage F1C-200 |

Casualties and losses
| Airfield heavily damaged | 2 Jaguars lightly damaged |
- Location within Chad

The Ouadi Doum airstrike was carried out by the French Air Force on 16 February 1986, against the Libyan airbase of Ouadi Doum in northern Chad, during the Chadian–Libyan conflict. The raid was significant in that it demonstrated French resolve to counter Gaddafi's expansionary aims and indicated France's commitment to its former colonies.

== Background ==
In an accord made in Crete in September 1984 between the Libyan and French presidents Muammar Gaddafi and François Mitterrand it was agreed that the French and Libyan forces would both leave Chad, which was then divided on the 16th parallel with Libya and the rebel GUNT keeping the north and the French and the Chadian government holding the south. But while France respected the accords, leaving Chad in 1984, Libya only reduced its forces, maintaining 5,000 men in the country.

When on Gaddafi's orders GUNT forces attacked southern Chad in February 1986 violating the 16th parallel, the French reaction was immediate: while on February 13 Opération Epervier started, which brought a thousand French troops to Chad, an air strike was prepared. The first move was to regroup about fifteen Mirage F1s and Jaguars in Bangui. The operation's target was to damage the airstrip of Ouadi Doum in northern Chad, a strip 3800 meters long, built by the Libyans between November 1984 and October 1985. Ouadi Doum had great strategic importance, as Libyan bombers were capable of flying from there to strike Chad's capital, N'Djamena.

More important still were the political aspects of the strike: Ouadi Doum was a symbol of Libyan duplicity. The French government intended the action to send a message to their African allies by proving their determination to confront Libyan expansion.

== Strike ==
On 16 February, 11 Jaguars of Escadron 1/11 Roussillon escorted by four Mirage F1's left Bangui for Ouadi Doum. When the French planes attacked, they were flying very close to the ground, in order to avoid detection by Libyan radar and surface-to-air missiles until it was too late. The planes made only one pass over the target, dropping about forty BAP 100 and classic bombs of 250 kg on the airstrip, severely damaging it and making it temporarily unusable. The entire attack lasted less than a minute. The last two Jaguars of the strike were late to the turn and flew into shrapnel and debris turned up by the Leader and Number 2 of the formation, sustaining minor damage but were still able to return to Bangui.

== Aftermath ==
Soon afterwards, the French minister of defence, Paul Quilès, announced that the runway at Ouadi Doum had been rendered unusable. Political reactions in France were all supportive of the government, with the exception of those of the French Communist Party. As for foreign reactions, Mitterrand obtained the support of the United States and, as was made clear at the summit of the Francophonie held in Paris from February 17 to 19, of most of the African countries.

Gaddafi's first reaction was to claim that the airstrip had only a civilian purposes and that the attack had caused the death of nine civilians. However Gaddafi retaliated the day after the raid when a Libyan Tupolev Tu-22 from Aouzou attacked the airport of Chad capital city N'Djamena. Staying under French radar coverage by flying low over the desert for more than 1,127 km (700 mi), it accelerated to over Mach 1, climbed to 5,030 m (16,503 ft) and dropped three heavy bombs. Despite the aircraft's considerable speed and altitude, the attack was extremely precise: two bombs hit the runway, one demolished the taxiway, and the airfield remained closed for several hours as a consequence. The bomber ran into technical problems on its return journey. U.S. early warning reconnaissance planes based in Sudan monitored distress calls sent by the pilot of the Tu-22 indicating it probably crashed before reaching its base at Aouzou (possibly hit by twin-tubes that fired in N'Djamena airport). In 1987, French aircraft struck the airfield again, this time targeting Libyan radar sites.

== See also ==
- Borkou-Ennedi-Tibesti Prefecture – region in which the base was located (?)
