= Butterfly Bomb =

German weapon

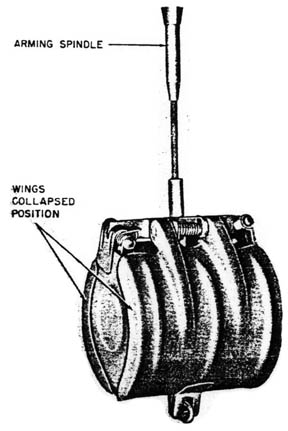
SD 2 – Closed: fuze is not yet armed.

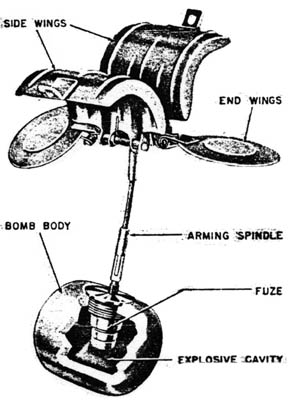
SD 2 – Open: wings have flipped open and screw threads at the base of arming spindle are visible: fuze is now armed.

The Butterfly Bomb (or Sprengbombe Dickwandig 2 kg or SD 2) was a German 2-kilogram (4.4 lb) anti-personnel submunition (or bomblet) used by the Luftwaffe during the Second World War. It was so named because the thin cylindrical metal outer shell which hinged open when the bomblet deployed gave it the superficial appearance of a large butterfly. The design was very distinctive and easy to recognise. SD 2 bomblets were not dropped individually, but were packed into containers holding between 6 and 108 submunitions e.g. the AB 23 SD 2 and AB 250-3 submunition dispensers. The SD 2 submunitions were released after the container was released from the aircraft and had burst open. Because SD 2s were always dropped in groups (never individually) the discovery of one unexploded SD 2 was a reliable indication that others had been dropped nearby. This bomb type was one of the first cluster bombs ever used in combat and it proved to be a highly effective weapon. The bomb containers that carried the SD 2 bomblets and released them in the air were nicknamed the "Devil's Eggs" by Luftwaffe air and ground crew.

== Description ==
The SD 2 submunition was a 76-millimetre (3.0 in) long cylinder of cast iron, which was slightly larger in diameter before its wings deployed. A steel cable 121 mm (4.8 in) long was attached via a spindle to an aluminium fuze screwed into the fuze pocket in the side of the bomblet. The outer shell was hinged and would flip open as two half-cylinders when it was dropped. Additionally, spring-loaded wings at the ends would flip out. The wings at the end were canted at an angle to the airflow, which turned the spindle (connected to the fuze) counterclockwise as the bomblet fell. After the spindle had revolved approximately 10 times (partially unscrewing itself from the bomb) it released a spring-loaded pin inside the fuze, which fully armed the SD 2 bomb. The wings and arming spindle remained attached to the bomb after the fuze had armed itself, as the bomb descended towards the ground. Butterfly bombs contained the kleine Zündladung 34 (kl. Zdlg. 34/Np with a blasting cap and 7 grams of Nitropenta) booster and the main explosive filling consisting of 225 grams of cast Füllpulver 60/40 (Amatol) explosive. The fragmentation density produced by an SD 2 was 1 fragment per m^{2} in 8 meters radius from a ground burst SD 2 bomb; overall, the body of an SD 2 produced about 250 fragments with a mass of over 1 gram and a still greater number of lighter fragments. The fragments were generally lethal to anyone within a radius of 10 metres (33 ft) and could inflict serious fragmentation injuries (e.g. deep penetrating eye wounds) as far away as 100 metres (330 ft). Butterfly bombs were usually painted either straw yellow (desert camouflage), or, if fitted with the DoppZ (41) or (41) A fuze, dark green or grey.

Butterfly bombs could be fitted with any one of three fuzes, which were made of aluminium and stamped with the model type surrounded by a circle:

- 41 fuze – has an external selector switch with two settings. The Zeit (time) setting will detonate the bomb in the air, approximately five seconds after being armed. The "AZ" (Aufschlagzünder - impact) setting triggers detonation when the bomb hits the ground. The fuze is armed if 4 screw threads at the base of the arming spindle are visible. This fuze is highly sensitive to disturbance if the selector switch is set to Zeit and the bomb is unexploded. The particular switch setting of any type 41 fuze is clearly visible on its exterior.
- 67 fuze – clockwork time delay. Time of detonation can be set between 5 and 30 minutes after arming itself in the air. This fuze also has an external selector switch for impact detonation. The particular switch setting of any type 67 fuze is clearly visible on its exterior.
- 70 fuze – anti-handling device (i.e. booby trap) will trigger detonation if the bomb is moved after impact with the ground. The fuze is armed if three screw threads at the base of the arming spindle are visible.

Butterfly bombs in a submunitions container could have a mixture of different fuzes fitted to increase disruption to the target. Additionally, when a single fuze type with two operating functions was fitted (e.g. type 41), bombs in a submunitions container could have either or both possible fuze settings selected by the Luftwaffe ground crew. Fuze variants such as the 41A, 41B, 70B1, 70B2, etc., also existed. These variants were inserted into the fuze pocket via a bayonet fitting (the fuze was held in place via two steel clips) but otherwise functioned identically.

As with more modern cluster bombs, it was not considered practical to disarm butterfly bombs which had fully armed themselves but failed to detonate. This was because SD 2 fuzes were deliberately designed to be extremely difficult and dangerous to render safe once they had armed themselves. Instead, the standard render safe procedure for any unexploded SD 2 butterfly bomb was to evacuate the area for at least 30 minutes (in case the bomblet was fitted with a type 67 time delay fuze), then surround it with a ring of sandbags (to contain the explosion) and destroy it in situ by detonating a small explosive charge beside it. Other solutions were to attach a long string to the bomb and tug on it after taking cover, or for bombs in open countryside, shooting at them with a rifle from a safe distance.

Not all unexploded SD 2 butterfly bombs still have their wings attached. In some cases the wings have rusted away and fallen off. The SD 2 then resembles a rusty tin can with an aluminium disc (the fuze) in its side, sometimes with a short stub projecting from it. Regardless of age and condition, all unexploded SD 2s remain highly sensitive to disturbance and can easily detonate.

== Use ==
Butterfly bombs were first used against Ipswich in 1940, but were also dropped on Kingston upon Hull, Grimsby and Cleethorpes in June 1943, amongst various other targets in the United Kingdom. Lieutenant Colonel Eric Wakeling led the clearance of the unexploded ordnance in Grimsby within the Royal Engineers. They were subsequently used against Allied forces in the Middle East. The British Government deliberately suppressed news of the damage and disruption caused by butterfly bombs in order to avoid encouraging continued use by the Germans. On October 28, 1940, some butterfly bombs that had failed to arm themselves properly were discovered in Ipswich by British Army ordnance technicians Sergeant Cann and 2nd Lieutenant Taylor. By screwing the arming rods back into the fuzes (i.e. the unarmed position) they were able to recover safe examples of the new weapon system to allow the British to reverse-engineer and understand the mechanism.

The SD 2 saw use in the opening stages of Operation Barbarossa, the German invasion of the Soviet Union which began on 22 June 1941. Twenty to thirty aircrews had been picked to drop SD 2s and SD10s (10 kg submunitions) on key Soviet airfields, a flight of three aircraft being assigned to each field. The purpose of these early attacks was to cause disruption and confusion as well as to preclude dispersion of Soviet planes until the main attack was launched. It was reported that Kampfgeschwader 51 lost 15 aircraft due to accidents with the SD 2s – nearly half of the total Luftwaffe losses that day.

Luftwaffe monthly consumption of the SD 2 increased from 289,000 examples in the summer of 1941 to 436,000 in July 1943 and 520,000 in August 1943. This increase was nowhere near high enough to match the Luftwaffe senior leadership's demands.

The AB 250-2 cluster bomb could carry 144 SD 2 anti-personnel submunitions, or 40 of the anti-armor SD-4 submunitions. While the AB 250-3 could carry 108 SD 2s. AB 250s were most frequently carried by the Focke-Wulf Fw 190 F/G series, but in practice, they could be lifted by a wide variety of aircraft, including the Me 262. Because of Hitler's interference, these jet-powered fighters were pressed into service as a Jabo (Jagdbomber, fighter-bomber), a role for which they were poorly suited. Notably, Me 262s were sent on nuisance raids against Eindhoven in early October, loaded with AB 250 bomblet dispensers.

The last recorded UK death from a German butterfly bomb in England occurred on November 27, 1956, over 11 years after the end of the war: Flight Lieutenant Herbert Derrington of the RAF was examining an SD 2 at the "Upminster bomb cemetery" (some remote sandpits situated East of RAF Hornchurch, where explosive ordnance disposal experimental and research work took place) when it detonated. He died of shrapnel and blast injuries at Oldchurch Hospital the same day.

On the island of Malta in 1981 Paul Gauci, a 41-year-old Maltese man, died after welding a butterfly bomb to a metal pipe and using it as a mallet, thinking it was a harmless can. The latest find of such a bomb was on 28 October 2009, by an 11-year-old boy in a secluded valley close to a heavily bombarded airfield. This bomb was safely detonated on-site by the Armed Forces of Malta.

== Gallery ==
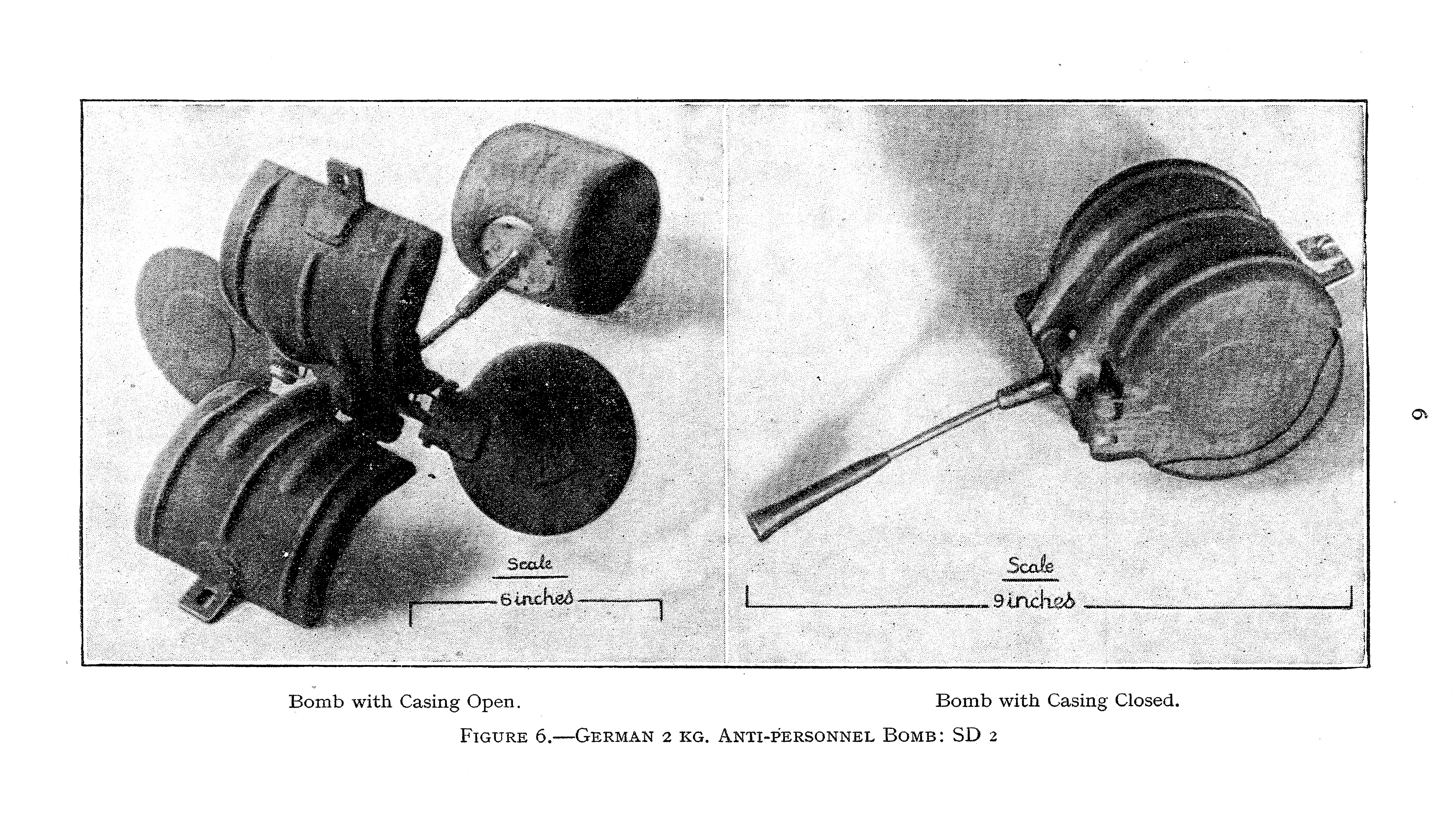
Photo of an SD 2 from Civil Defence Training Pamphlet No 2: Objects Dropped From The Air (3rd Edition).

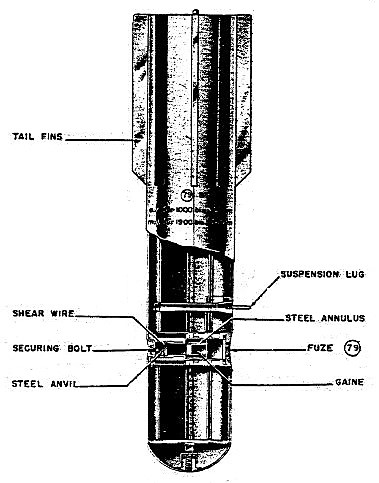
AB 23 submunition dispenser.

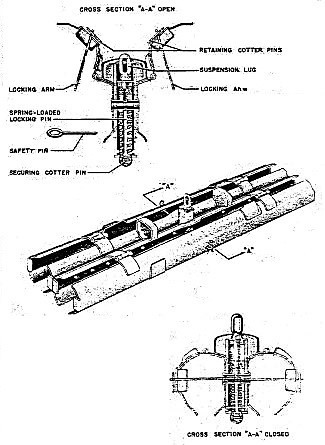
AB 24T submunition dispenser.

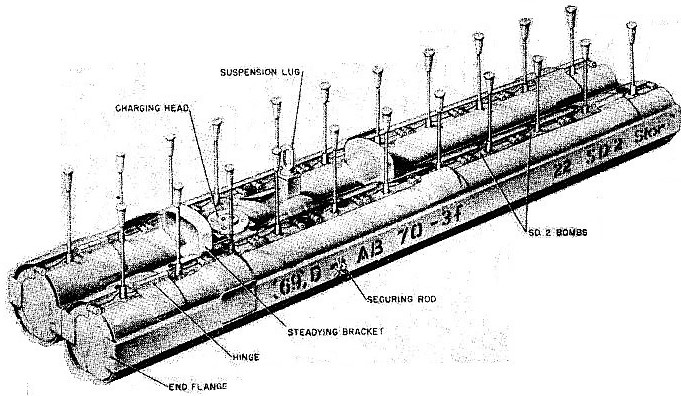
AB 70-3 submunition dispenser.

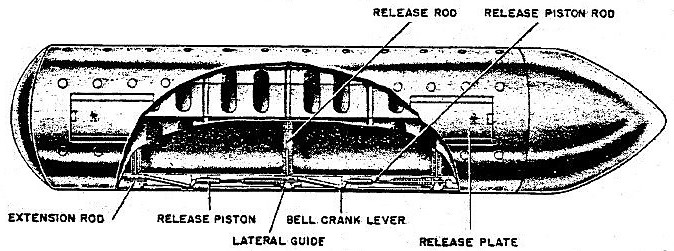
AB 250-1 submunition dispenser.

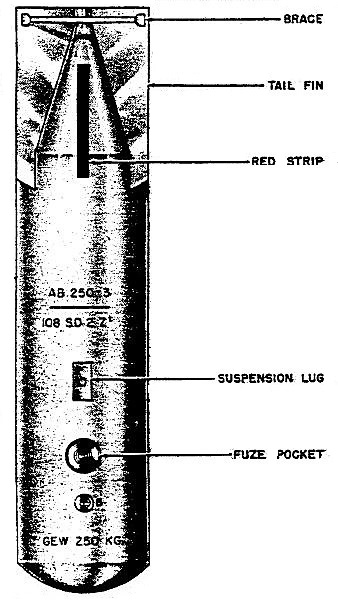
AB 250-3 submunition dispenser.

== US copy ==
The United States manufactured a copy of the SD 2 for use during World War II, the Korean War and Vietnam War, designating it the M83 submunition. The 3 fuze types used on the M83 submunition were slightly modified versions of the original German designs:

- M128A1 - airburst or impact fuze. Airburst detonation occurred 2.5 seconds after arming. Detonation on impact was instantaneous. The fuze setting is clearly marked on the exterior and was selectable by ground crew
- M130A1 - clockwork time fuze with time delays ranging from 10, 20, 30, 40, 50 or 60 minutes. Has no markings, but is recognisable by the square-shaped fitting for the arming spindle
- M131A1 - anti-disturbance fuze. Detonation triggered when the device was disturbed. Has no markings, but is recognisable by the pentagonal-shaped fitting for the arming spindle

The 4-pound (1.8 kg) M83 fragmentation bomblet was used in the US M28 and M29 cluster bombs.

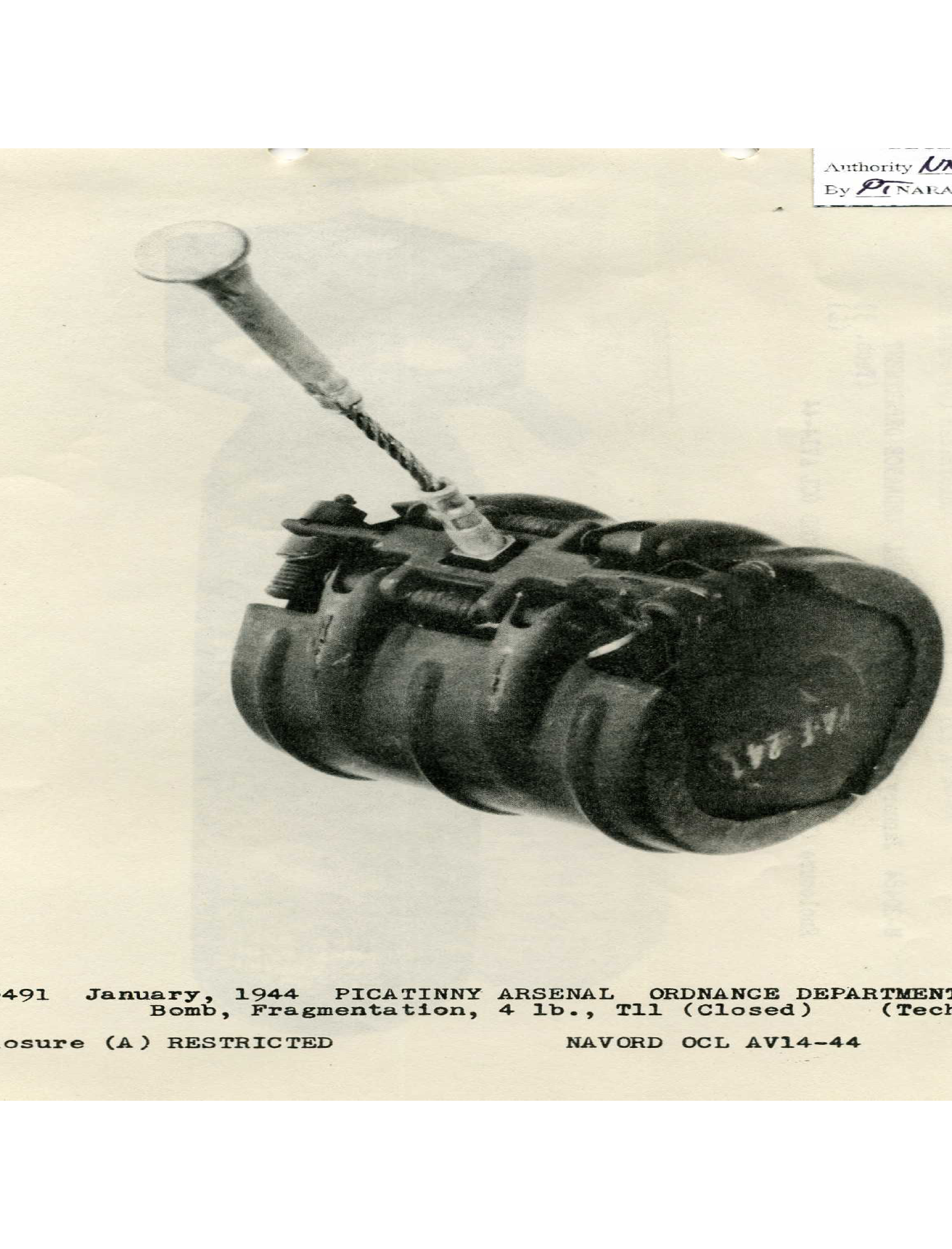
US M83 cluster bomb with wings closed. The fuze has not yet armed itself

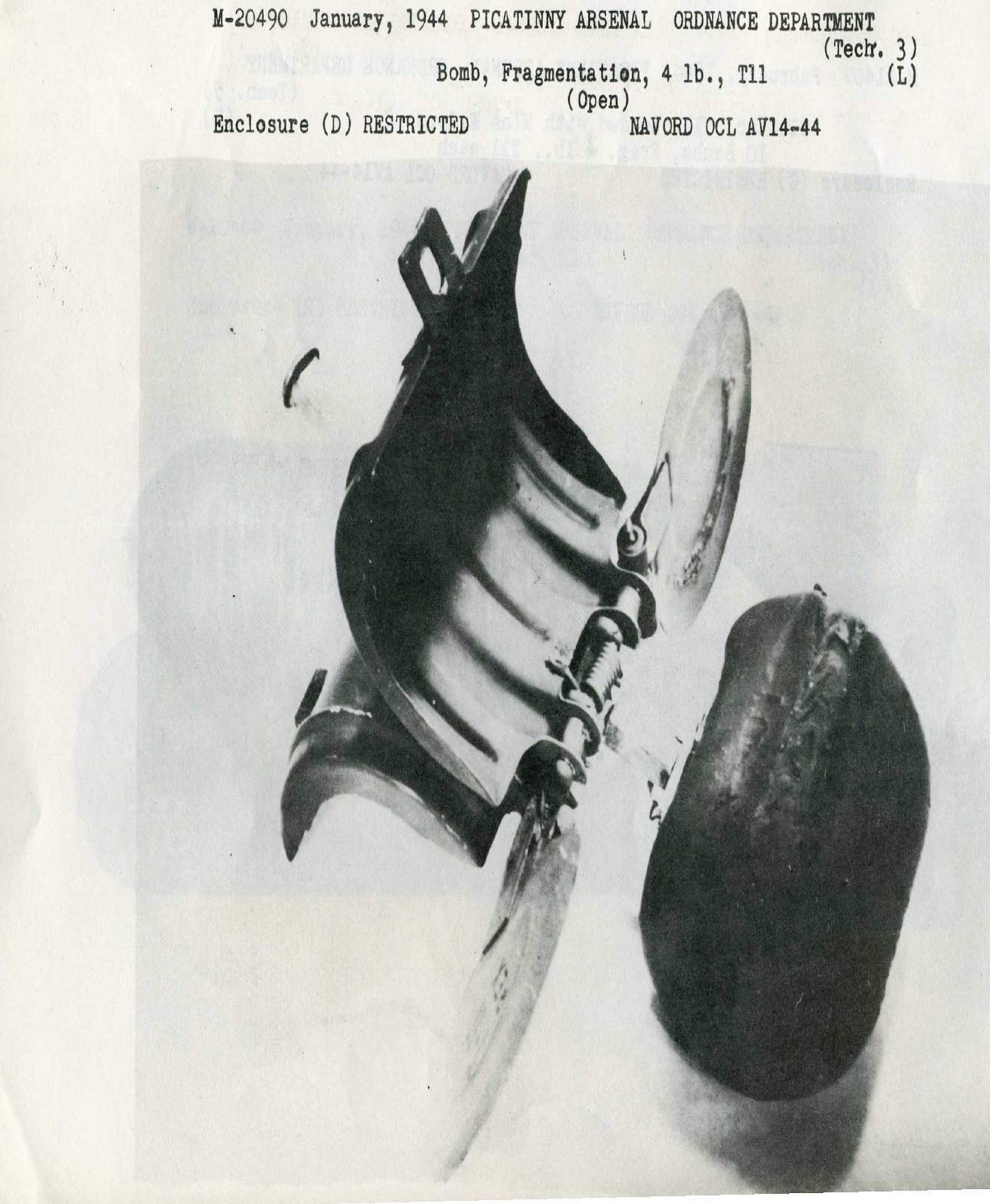
US M83 cluster bomb with wings deployed.

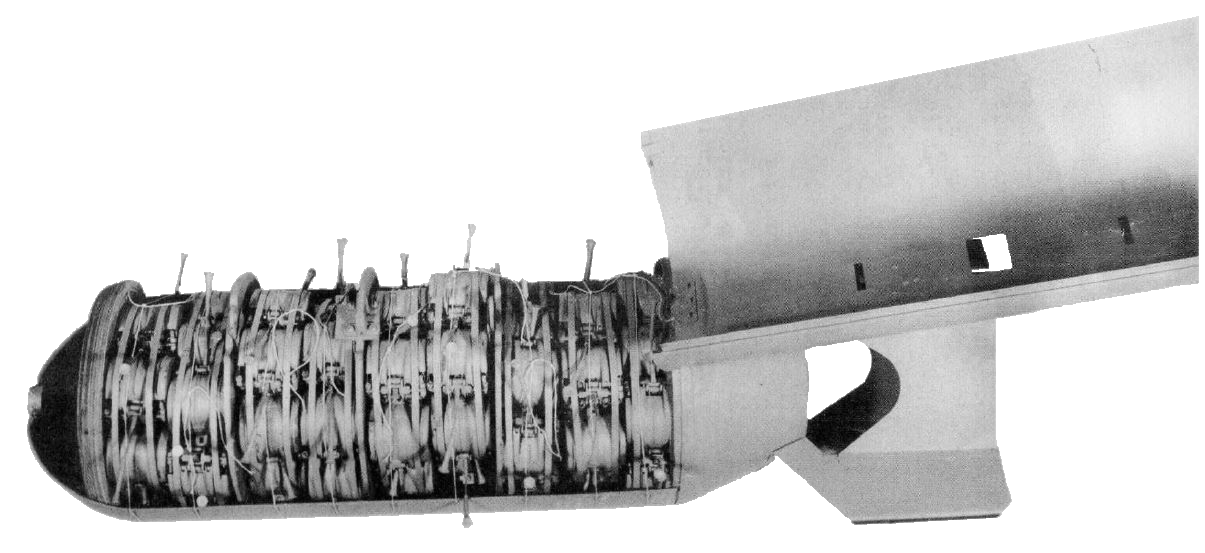
500 lb M29 cluster bomb with ninety M83 submunitions inside it

== See also ==
- Thermos Bomb
