= AB 250-3 =

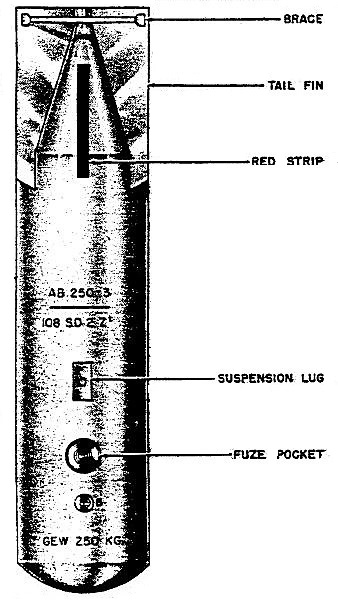
- Type: Cluster bomb
- Place of origin: Nazi Germany

Service history
- Used by: Luftwaffe
- Wars: World War II

Specifications
- Mass: 250 kg (550 lb)
- Length: 1.63 m (5 ft 4 in)
- Diameter: 38 cm (1 ft 3 in)
- Warhead: 108 x SD 2 anti-personnel bombs

The AB 250-3 (Abwurfbehälter) was an anti-personnel cluster bomb used by the Luftwaffe during World War II.

== AB 250-3 ==
The AB 250-3 could be suspended horizontally within a bomb bay or fuselage or wing hardpoint. It also had trunnions so it could be dropped by dive bombers. The body of the AB 250-3 was constructed of mild sheet steel and was of clamshell construction and hinged at the tail. It was divided into three compartments; a dome-shaped nose compartment, a cylindrical center compartment, and a cone-shaped tail compartment. The AB 250-3 could carry 108 x SD 2 anti-personnel bombs in its center section. The AB 250-3 was similar to the other AB 250 containers except it had six tail fins instead of four welded to the container with braces riveted between each fin. The nose compartment housed the fuze pocket which was welded to a bracket on the upper half of the container. The two halves were held together by a shear wire which passed through a steel anvil, in the lower part of the fuze pocket. When dropped a time fuze was triggered and after a few seconds, the wire holding the container together was sheared by a small exploder under the fuze. The case then opened and allowed the bombs to fall out. The containers were painted dark green with two longitudinal red stripes on tail cone.

== Gallery ==
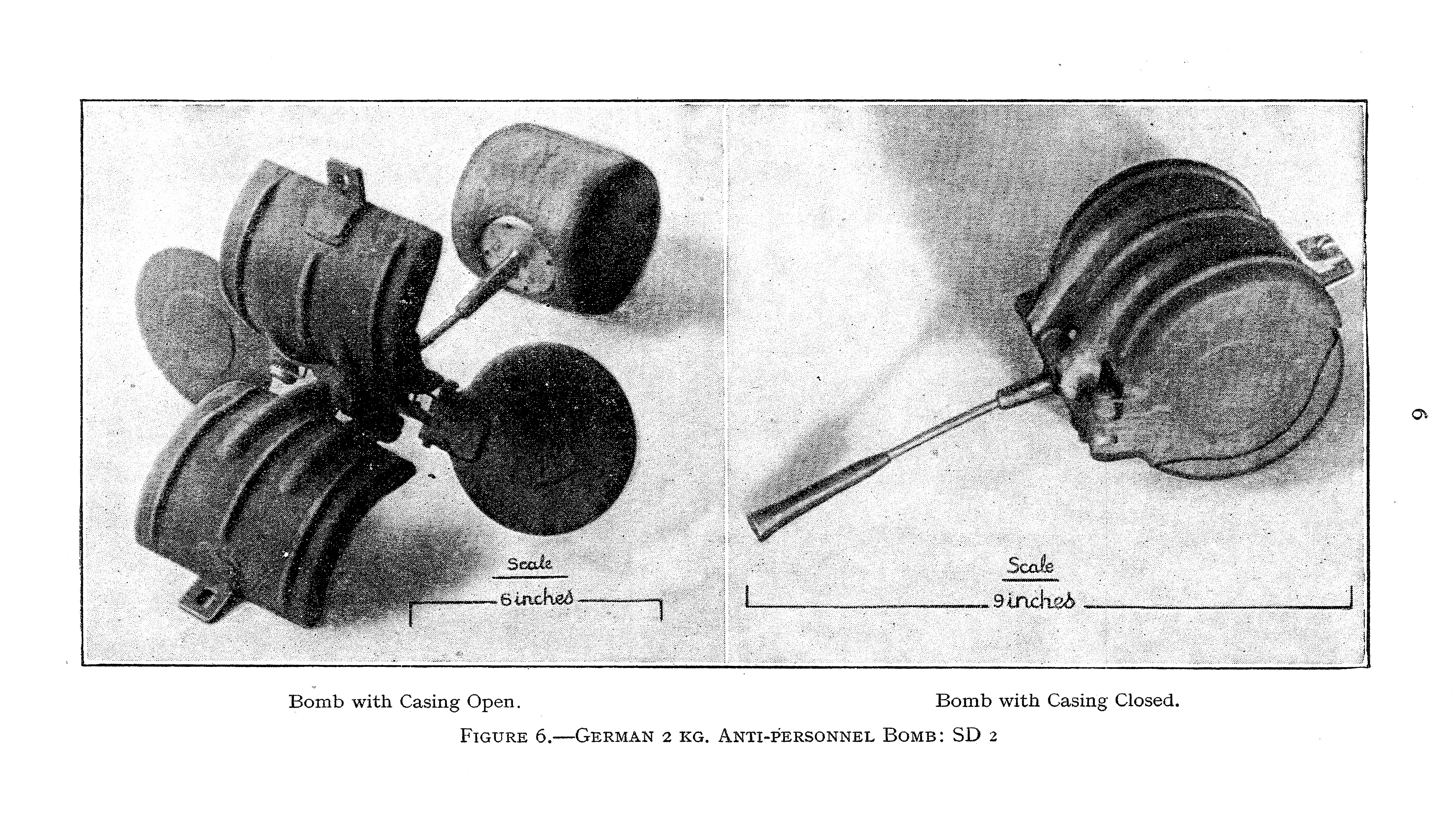
A photo of a SD 2 from Civil Defence Training Pamphlet No 2: Objects Dropped From The Air (3rd Edition).

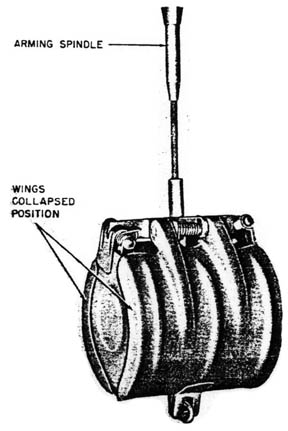
SD 2 - Closed: The fuze is not yet armed.

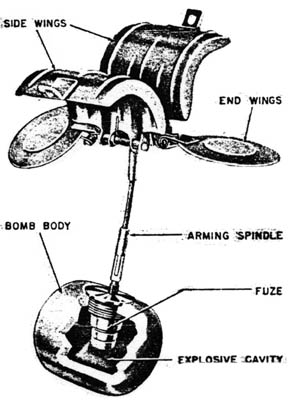
SD 2 - Open: wings have flipped open and screw threads at the base of arming spindle are visible: fuze is now armed.

== See also ==
- List of weapons of military aircraft of Germany during World War II
