= BETAB-500 =

Soviet/Russian concrete-piercing bomb

The BETAB-500 (Russian: БетАБ-500) or the BETAB-500 Concrete-Piercing Bomb is a Soviet and Russian 500-kilogram (1,100 lb) bomb designed to penetrate and destroy reinforced concrete structures and to damage runways. During the Syrian civil war, the Russian military has used it repeatedly. In 2016, apparently the first use of this bomb in an urban environment occurred in the Eastern part of the city of Aleppo.

== Specifications ==
Main characteristics

- Diameter: 350 mm (14 in)
- Length: 2,200 mm (87 in)

Weight

- bomb: 477 kg (1,052 lb)
- explosive (TNT equivalent ): 98 kg (216 lb)

Operational envelope

- release altitude: 30–5,000 m (100–16,400 ft)
- release speed: 600–1,200 km/h (370–750 mph)
