= AB 23 =

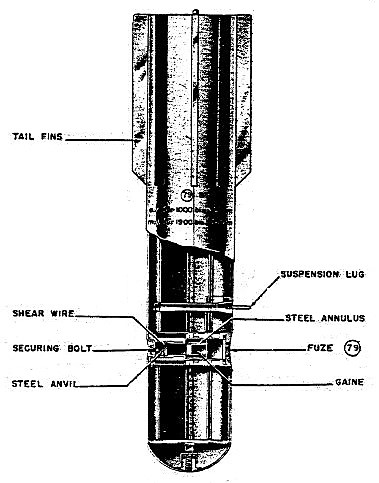
- Type: Cluster bomb
- Place of origin: Nazi Germany

Service history
- Used by: Luftwaffe
- Wars: World War II

Specifications
- Mass: 46 kg (101 lb)
- Length: 1.09 m (3 ft 7 in)
- Diameter: 20 cm (8 in)

The AB 23 (Abwurfbehälter) was a cluster bomb used by the Luftwaffe during World War II.

== Design ==
The body of the AB 23 was constructed of mild sheet steel with four fins welded to the rear of the container. The AB 23 was composed of two longitudinal halves and was internally divided by two sheet metal discs held in place by steel rods. The front compartment held six bombs while the rear compartment held seventeen bombs. The two halves of the container were held together by a shear wire which passed through a steel anvil, in the lower part of the fuze pocket. When the fuze was triggered, the wire was sheared by a small exploder under the fuze. The case then opened allowing the bombs to fall out. By removing the sheet metal discs it could also be used to drop strips of metal coated paper for disrupting enemy radars. The AB 23 was painted dark green and there were two longitudinal red stripes running the length of the tail fins.

The AB 23 could be configured for two different payloads:

- 23 x SD 2 anti-personnel mines.
- Metallic foil chaff.

== See also ==
- List of weapons of military aircraft of Germany during World War II
