= Trocano =

Brazilian thermobaric weapon

Trocano bomb
- Type: Thermobaric weapon
- Place of origin: Brazil

Service history
- In service: 2011
- Used by: Brazilian Air Force

Specifications
- Warhead: Tritonal
- Warhead weight: 9,000 kg

Trocano (tɾoˈkɐnu) is a Brazilian thermobaric weapon similar in design to the United States' MOAB weapon or Russia's FOAB. Like the US weapon, the Trocano is designed to be pallet-loaded into a C-130 Hercules - "Hércules" (ˈɛʁkuleʃ) - aircraft, and deployed using a parachute to drag it from the C-130's cargo bay and separate from its pallet, at which point the bomb's own aerodynamics determine its drop trajectory.

The project began in 2004. It was under request of EMAER (Estado Maior da Aeronáutica - Military Staff of Aeronautics) and DIRMAB (Diretoria de Material Aeronáutico e Bélico - Board of Aeronautical and Military Equipment) that the IAE (Instituto de Aeronáutica e Espaço - Institute of Aeronautics and Space) started the Trocano project.

Due to its destructive power it is described as a defense system to be used in the interdiction of large areas and to possibly clear the tree-dense terrain for landing of rotary-wing aircraft.

The Trocano contains 9,000 kg of tritonal, producing a total destruction blast radius of 1 kilometre (0.62 mi). Despite this, Trocano places third on blast yield behind both the US (containing 8,150 kg of H6 explosive, more powerful than tritonal) and the Russian weapon (with 11,000 kg of explosive). Thus receiving the nickname "Mother of all Brazilian bombs" or "Brazilian MOAB".

The Brazilian Air Force confirmed the development of the bomb in 2011. In the Activities Report document, it is confirmed that Trocano received the "Certificação de Produto Aeronáutico Aprovado" (Certification of Approved Aeronautic Product), which meant that "all the requirements have been fulfilled". It also received the "Certificado de Integração à Aeronave C-130" (Certification of Integration to Airship C-130), signifying its possible usage in the Air Force Hercules airships - that carry the same name as the Greek legendary hero Hercules.

The project was conducted under the Brazilian norms NBR 15100 (regulating airspace system quality), making IAE the first public institution in Brazil to receive the certification NBR 15100:2004. The serial production was said to be defrayed by EMAER and passed on to the national industry. The certifications attained by the project served as an important achievement by the IAE to attest their quality management.
