= M29 cluster bomb =

M29 Cluster Bomb
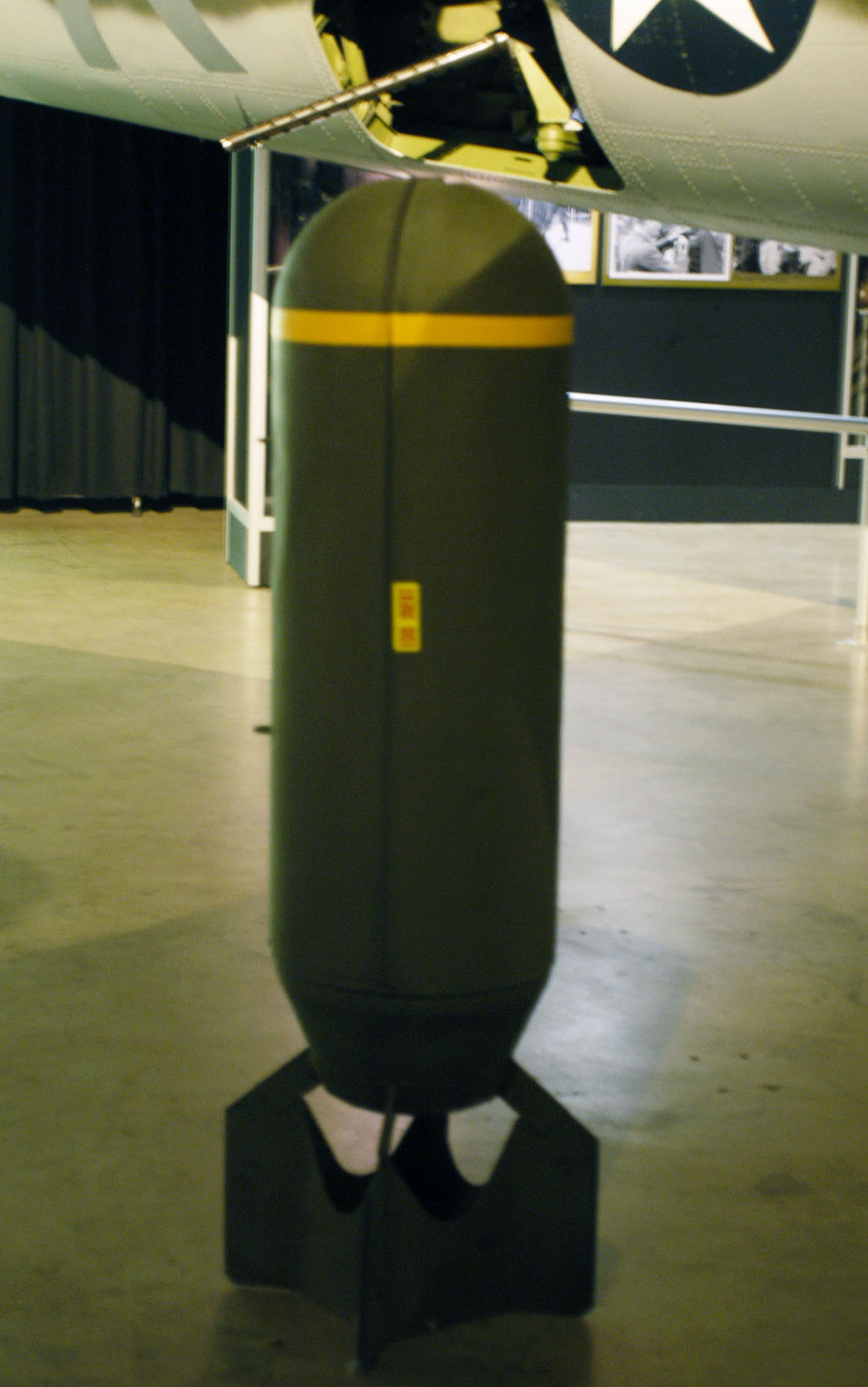
- Museum example
- Type: Cluster bomb
- Place of origin: United States

Service history
- Used by: United States
- Wars: World War II; Korean War; Vietnam War

Production history
- Designer: Copy of German design

Specifications
- Mass: 500 pounds (230 kg)
- Filling: 90x 4-pound (1.8 kg) M83 fragmentation submunitions in 9 "wafers" of ten bombs each.

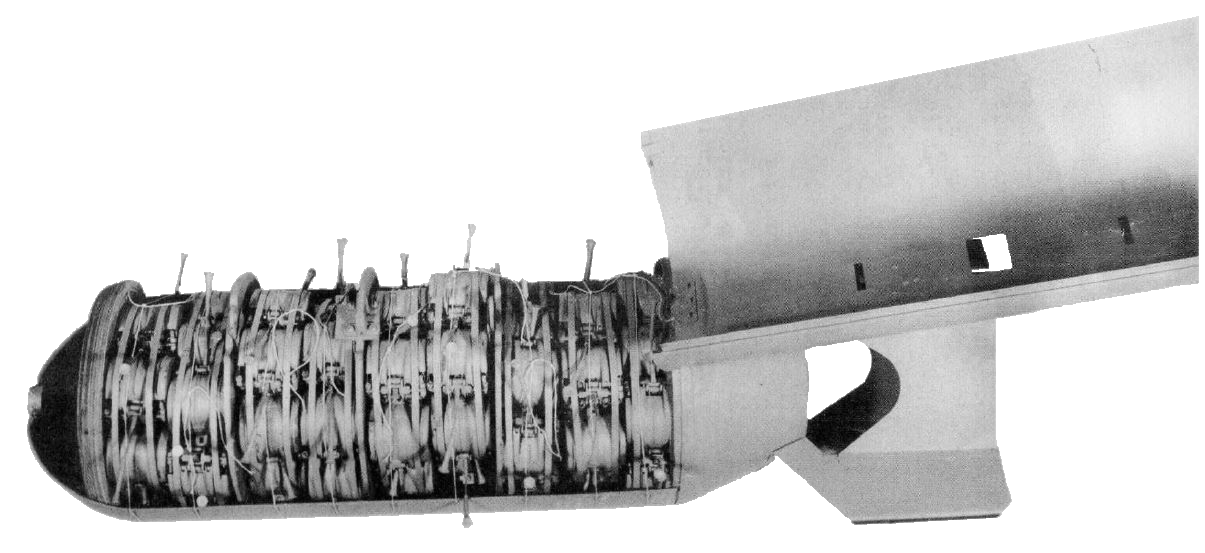
Cutaway of M29 cluster bomb showing nine "wafers" of bombs

The M29 cluster bomb was a 500-pound (230 kg) cluster bomb used by the United States Air Force during World War II against troops, unarmoured vehicles and artillery. The weapon contained ninety 4-pound (1.8 kg) M83 fragmentation submunitions - a direct copy of the earlier German Butterfly Bomb - in 9 ten-bomb "wafers". The M28 was a 100-pound (45 kg) equivalent of the M29 containing 24 bomblets.

Both bombs contained a mechanical time fuze that could be set to open the cluster at a preselected time between 5 and 92 seconds by triggering a burster charge. The case sides and ends sprung open, allowing the bomblets to fall out. The case sides were cup-shaped to retard the fall of the bomb. The manual warns that "Use of the M131 fuze is not recommended in areas that are expected to be occupied by friendly forces as they constitute a potential booby trap".

== See also ==
- List of cluster bombs
