= BAP 100 =

French anti-runway cluster bomb

The BAP 100 (French:Bombe Anti-Piste 100 mm, Anti-Runway Bomb) is a French anti-runway cluster bomb developed in the mid-1970s, and which entered service with the French Air Force in the early 1980s. The bomb consists of eighteen submunitions, arranged in a cluster. Accelerated by an internal propulsion system, the munitions are designed to ensure total runway destruction in a single pass by aircraft.

The parachute of the BAP 100 is designed to withstand a maximum speed of 450 kts.

Forty of the munitions were used by the French Air Force during the Ouadi Doum airstrike in 1986.

== See also ==
- JP233 - a British anti-runway weapon
- Matra Durandal - a larger French anti-runway weapon adopted by the French Air Force
- Smart Anti-Airfield Weapon - an Indian anti-runway weapon
