= CBU-98/B =

Anti-airfield cluster bomb

The CBU-98/B (also known as a Direct Airfield Attack Combined Munition or DAACM) was a planned 385 kg (850 lb) anti-airfield cluster bomb, which consisted of 8 BLU-106/B BKEP (Boosted Kinetic Energy Penetrator) projectiles and 24 British HB876 mines in an SUU-64/B Tactical Munitions Dispenser (TMD). The BLU-106/B was cancelled, and thus the CBU-98/B, was never produced.

== See also ==
- List of cluster bombs
