= CBU-75 =

The CBU-75 Sadeye was a United States cluster bomb used during the Vietnam War. It could hold 1,800 one pound (450 g) BLU-26 anti-personnel bomblets, each containing 0.7 pounds (320 g) of explosives with impact or time delay fuzes that would produce around 600 fragments.
