= Matra Durandal =

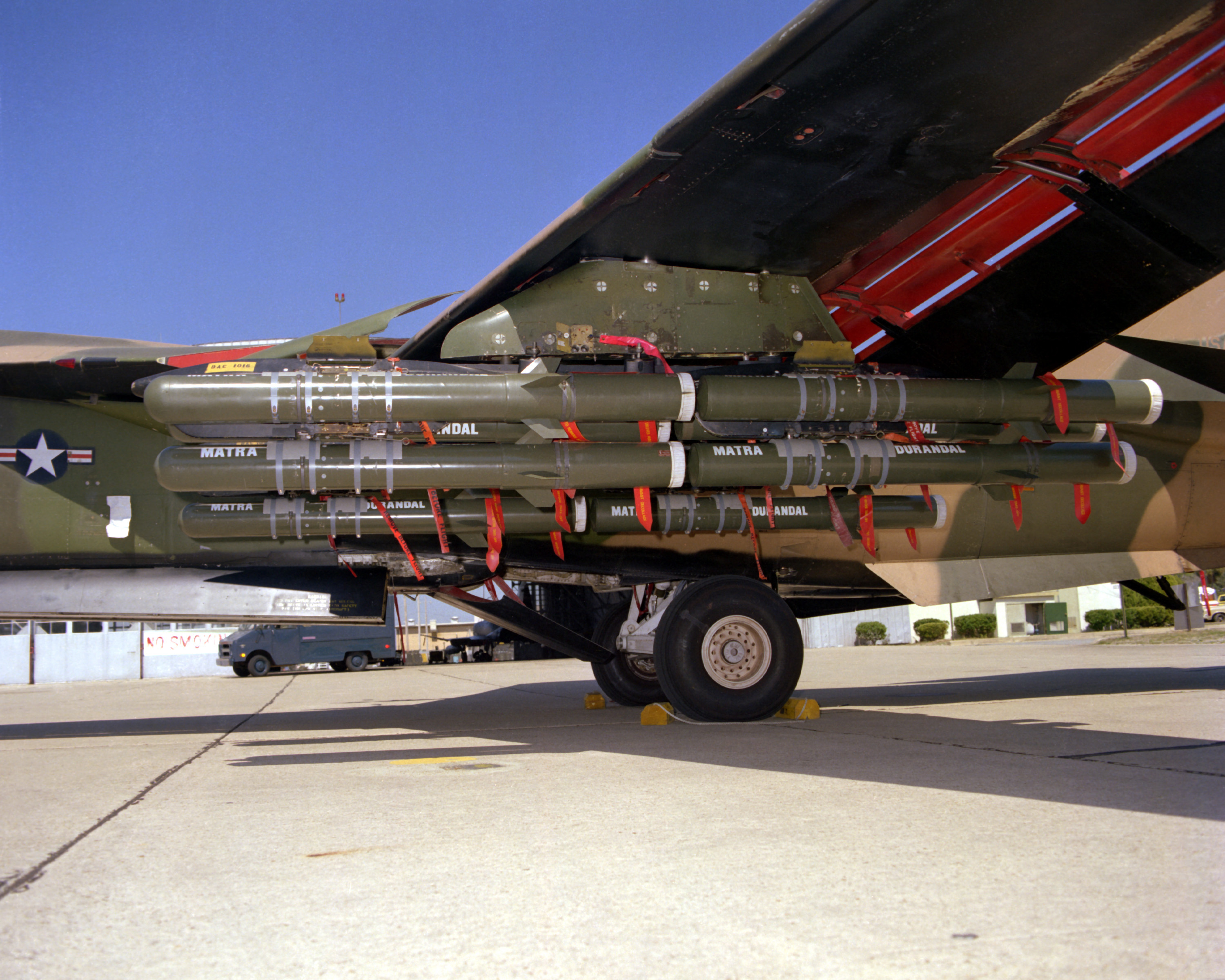
- An American F-111 carrying BLU-107 Durandals in December 1981.
- Type: Anti-runway bomb
- Place of origin: France

Service history
- In service: 1977–present
- Used by: United States, France, Israel
- Wars: Gulf War (1991)

Production history
- Manufacturer: Matra (now MBDA)

Specifications
- Mass: 200 kg (440 lb)
- Length: 2.7 m (8 ft 10 in)
- Diameter: 22.3 cm (8.8 in)
- Warhead weight: 100 kg (220 lb) primary charge 15 kg (33 lb) secondary charge

The Durandal is an anti-runway penetration bomb developed by the French company Matra (now MBDA), designed to destroy airport runways and exported to several countries. A simple crater in a runway could be filled in without issue, so the Durandal uses two explosions to displace the concrete slabs of a runway, thus making the damage to the runway far more difficult to repair. The bomb is named after a mythical medieval French sword.

== Overview ==
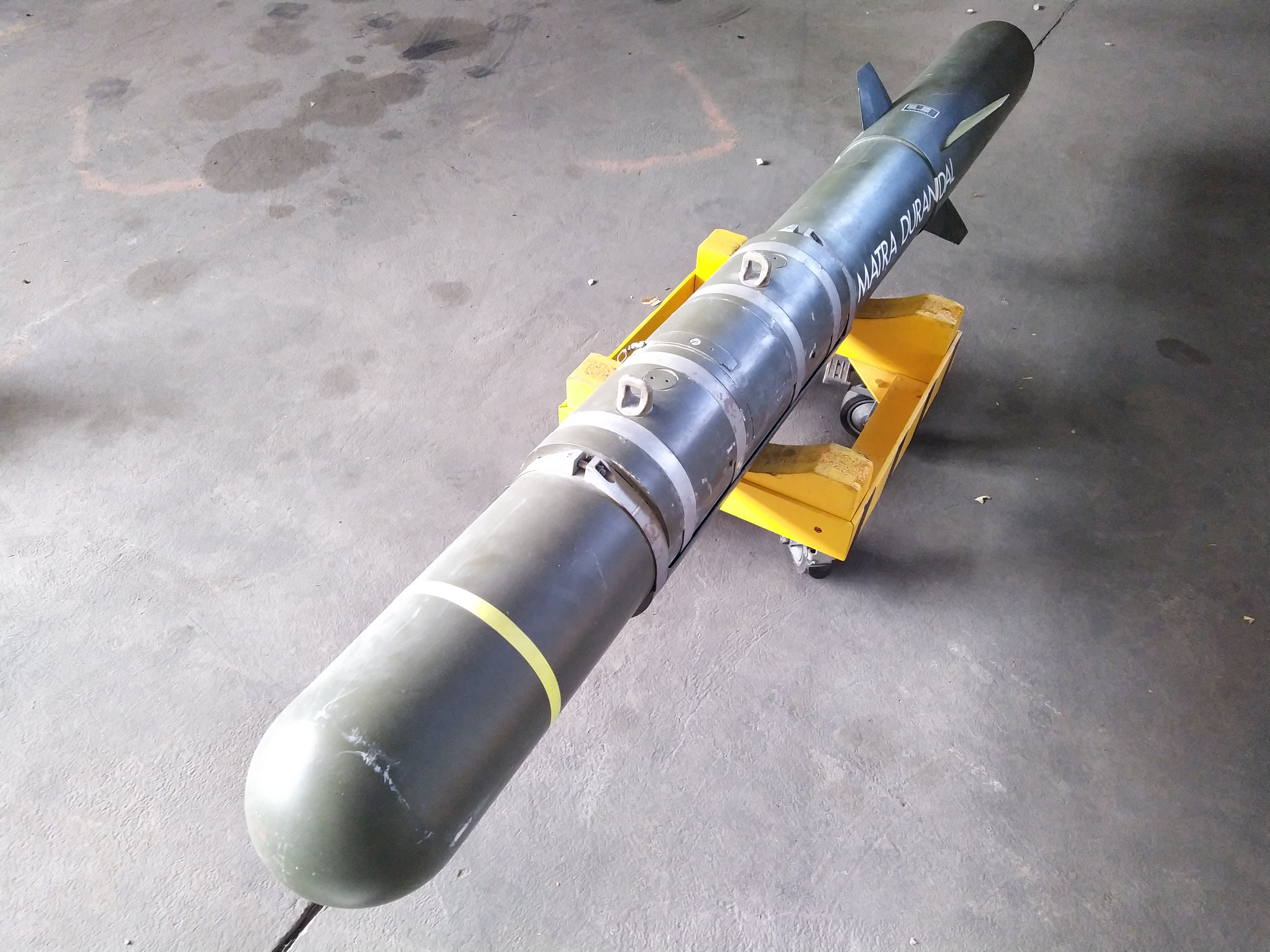
Durandal, Conservatoire de l'air et de l'espace d'Aquitaine, 2024.

Designed to be dropped from low altitudes, the bomb's fall is slowed by a parachute. The maximum release speed is 550 knots (1,020 km/h; 630 mph) and the minimum release altitude is 200 feet (61 m). When the bomb has reached a 40° angle due to the parachute's drag, it fires a rocket booster that accelerates it into the runway surface. The 100-kilogram (220 lb) primary charge explodes after the weapon has penetrated the concrete and drives the secondary charge even deeper. The 15-kilogram (33 lb) secondary charge then explodes after a one-second delay. Later production weapons have a programmable fuse that can delay the secondary detonation up to several hours.

The weapon can penetrate up to 40 centimetres (16 in) of concrete, and creates a crater 2 metres (6 ft 7 in) deep and approximately 5 metres (16 ft) in diameter. In addition, concrete slabs around the crater are disturbed in an area approximately 15 metres (49 ft) in diameter. The disturbed slabs are displaced up to 50 centimetres (20 in) above the original surface, making repair more difficult than the simple crater from a conventional bomb.

== Service history ==
There is a persistent story that the first use of the current Matra Durandal was by Israeli Mirages during the Six-Day War. This is inaccurate, as this war took place ten years before the Durandal was first available on the arms market. Rather, the prototype French/Israeli anti-runway weapon program which cratered Egyptian runways in 1967 is related, but distinct from the Durandal. The Israeli weapon used rockets rather than parachutes to brake over the target. The Matra development branch was in development from 1971 on and would form the basis for the Durandal which uses parachute braking.

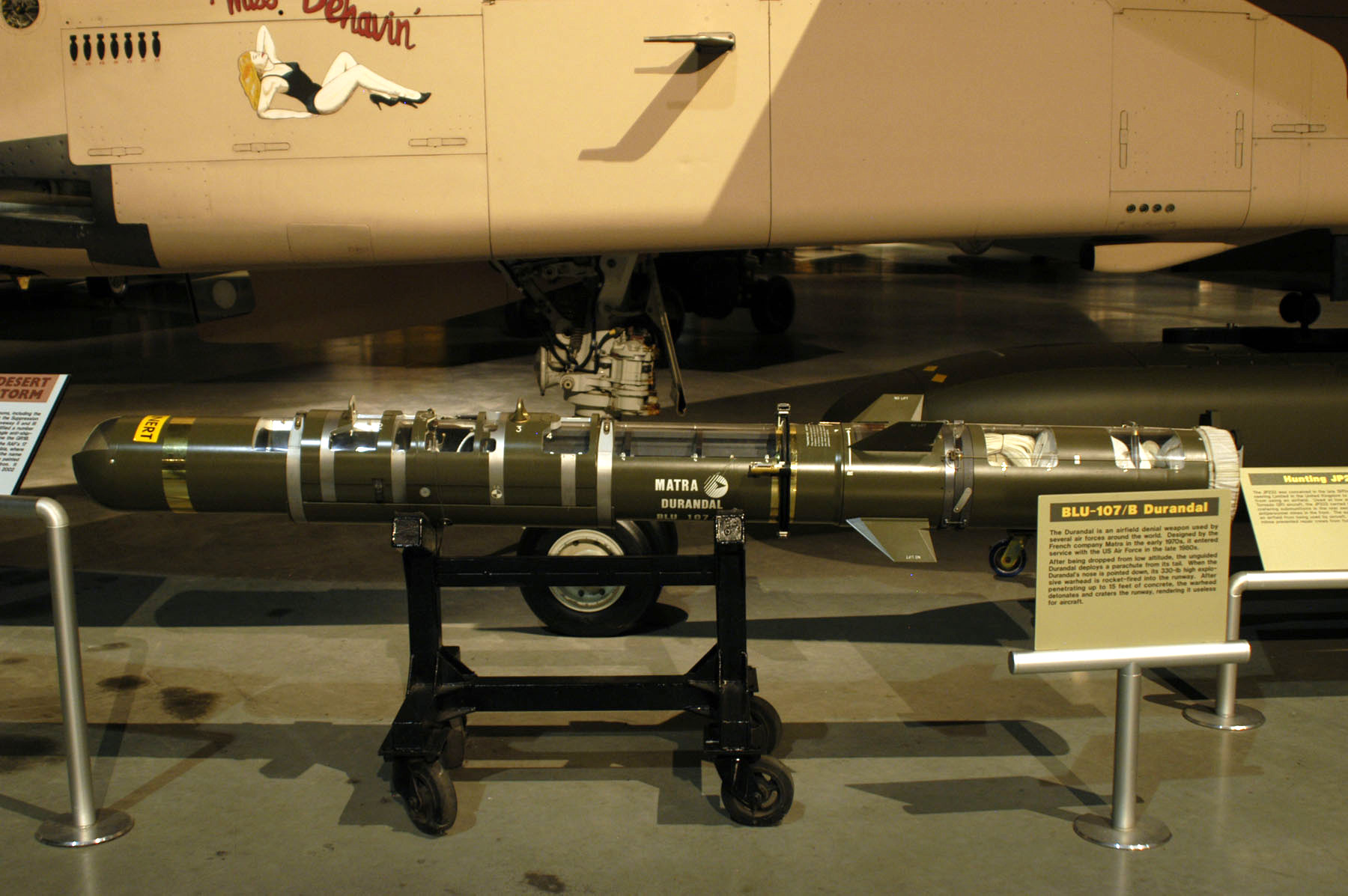
BLU-107/B Durandal on display in the Cold War Gallery at the National Museum of the U.S. Air Force.

The Durandal was adopted by the US in a slightly modified form (with a steeper impact angle and a higher 630 knot deployment speed) as the BLU-107/B in the 1980s, and carried by F-111 and F-15E strike aircraft.

The U.S. Air Force procurement program for Durandal
Fiscal Year	1983	1984	1985	1986	1987	Total
Dollars in millions	9.2	23.3	87.5	184.1	195.1	499.2
Quantity	350	840	3,000	6,000	6,000	16,190

In addition, the Durandal is in service with Argentina, Turkey, and at least 14 other nations. The Durandal is not currently in the weapon inventory of the French Armée de l'Air.

It was used by the US Air Force in Desert Storm, delivered by F-111E's of the 20th Fighter Wing based in Turkey. 20th Wing flight commander Captain George Kelman said "there is nothing better at destroying a runway than a Durandal."

It has been reported that China has developed its own anti-runway bombs, the Type 200A, using Durandals as models. In the 1980s, China purchased a number of Durandals from France.

== Users ==
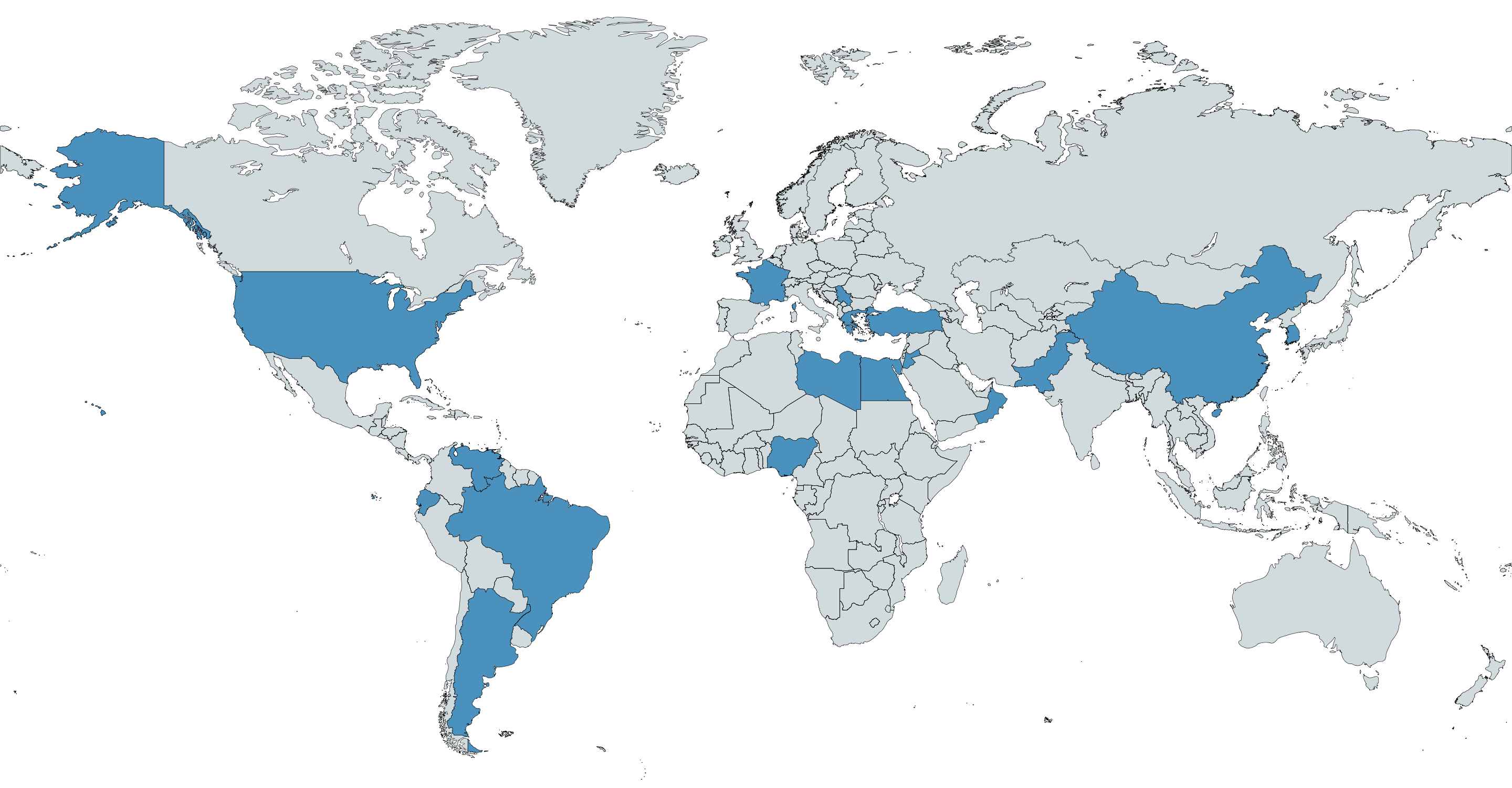
Map with Durandal users in blue

- Argentina
- Brazil
- China
- Ecuador
- Egypt
- France
- Greece
- Jordan
- Libya
- Nigeria
- Oman
- Pakistan
- Serbia
- South Korea
- Turkey
- United States
- Venezuela
- Yugoslavia

== See also ==
- BAPI – A Brazilian anti-runway weapon
- Smart Anti-Airfield Weapon – An Indian precision-guided anti-airfield weapon
- JP233 – A British anti-runway weapon
- BAP 100 – A smaller French anti-runway weapon adopted by the French Air Force
