= Smart Anti-Airfield Weapon =

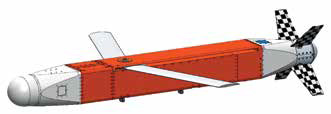
- Type: Anti-airfield weapon
- Place of origin: India

Service history
- Wars: 2025 India–Pakistan conflict

Production history
- Designer: Research Centre Imarat
- Manufacturer: Hindustan Aeronautics Limited; Bharat Dynamics Limited
- Produced: 2020–present

Specifications
- Mass: 125 kg (276 lb)
- Length: 1.85 m (6 ft 1 in)
- Warhead: HE, PCB
- Warhead weight: 80 kg (180 lb)
- Operational range: 90–100 kilometres (56–62 mi)
- Guidance system: Mid-course: INS + multi-GNSS; Terminal: EO/IIR homing
- Accuracy: <7m (INS-GNSS); <3m (EO/IIR)
- Launch platform: SEPECAT Jaguar; Dassault Mirage 2000; Mikoyan MiG-29; Sukhoi Su-30MKI; HAL Tejas; Hawk-i; HAL CATS Warrior (planned)

The Smart Anti-Airfield Weapon (SAAW) is a precision-guided long-range anti-airfield weapon developed by India's Defence Research and Development Organisation. It is designed to be capable of engaging ground targets with high precision up to a range of 100 kilometres (62 mi).

The SAAW project was approved by the Government of India in 2013. The first successful test of the weapon was conducted in May 2016. Another successful test was conducted in November of the following year. This was followed by a series of three successful tests in December 2017.

Between 16 and 18 August 2018, three successful tests were conducted, which brought the total number of tests to eight.

In September 2020, the SAAW was approved for procurement by the Indian Government for the Navy and the Air Force.

== Description ==
The SAAW has been developed by the Research Centre Imarat, and other DRDO laboratories in collaboration with the Indian Air Force. It is a lightweight high precision guided bomb designed to destroy ground targets, such as runways, bunkers, aircraft hangars and other reinforced structures. Weighing 125 kg (276 lb) it has deep penetration capabilities, carries a high explosive warhead and has a standoff range of 100 kilometres (62 mi), which enables users to strike targets, such as enemy airfields, at a safe distance without putting pilots and aircraft in jeopardy. It is India's first fully indigenous anti-airfield weapon, designed and developed wholly by the DRDO.

According to the then DRDO chief, S. Christopher, unlike normal bombs in the Indian inventory which are sensitive to environmental conditions and therefore may not precisely hit the intended target, the precision-guided SAAW has higher precision and can precisely hit the intended target. According to him,

this is a sort of guided bomb and it will be much much cheaper than a missile or rocket, the reason being that it is not having a propulsion, it is making use of the aircraft's propulsion. It can go and land in a place we want.

The SAAW can currently be launched from the Jaguar and Su-30MKI aircraft. The Su-30MKI is capable of carrying 20-32 SAAW by using indigenous four-round Smart Quad Rack system under its pylon. There are plans to integrate the weapon with the Dassault Rafale and HAL Tejas MK1A when it is inducted into the Indian Air Force. With an equal class of up to 1,000 kg (2,200 lb), SAAW has been designed for greater accuracy.

== Development and trials ==
In September 2013, the SAAW project was sanctioned by the Indian Government for ₹56.58 crore (US$6.0 million). The project finds mention in a written note submitted by the Ministry of Defence to the Standing Committee on Defence, in a report on 'Demands for Grants' to be provided in 2014–15 to the Ordnance Factories Board and the DRDO. It is also listed in the list of current programmes of the Mission and Combat System R&D Center of Hindustan Aeronautics Limited.

=== SAT-SAAW ===
During June 2025, reports indicated that a proposal for the procurement of a satellite-guided variant of the SAAW had been forwarded by the Indian Air Force to the Ministry of Defence. The proposal would be cleared soon. On 23 September 2026, an order for 160 Satellite Smart Anti Airfield Weapons (SAT-SAAW) for the Indian Air Force was placed with deliveries to be completed 2029. The weapon will be integrated with SEPECAT Jaguar and HAL Tejas.

=== Trials ===
- Trials for the wing functioning of the weapon were successfully conducted in late 2015 at the Rail Track Rocket Sled facility located at the Terminal Ballistics Research Laboratory.
- According to plans, the weapon was to be tested by the beginning of May 2016 in Jaisalmer. However, owing to technical reasons, the test had to be aborted twice. The maiden flight test of the weapon was finally conducted at the end of the first week of May 2016 by the Aircraft and Systems Testing Establishment of the IAF from a Jaguar DARIN II aircraft in Bengaluru, and the test was successful.
- A second test of the weapon was successfully conducted on 24 December 2016 by the DRDO from a Su-30MKI aircraft at the Integrated Test Range. It included captive flight and release tests which were tracked by radar and telemetry ground stations at the ITR throughout the flight duration.
- On 3 November 2017, a series of three tests were successfully conducted from an Indian Air Force aircraft at the ITR. The bomb, upon release from the aircraft, was guided by an on-board precision navigation system and reached the targets at a range of more than 70 kilometers with high accuracy. According to a statement by the MoD, the tests were conducted with different release conditions and ranges. The statement also cited DRDO chief S. Christopher as saying that the weapon will soon be inducted into service.
- On 16 and 18 August 2018, a total of three tests were successfully conducted from a Jaguar aircraft between at the Chandan range in Pokhran, thus bringing the total number of tests to eight. During the tests, the SAAW, fitted with a live warhead, destroyed the intended targets with high precision. The press statement further said that all the mission objectives were achieved, adding that the tests were witnessed by senior officials from the DRDO, HAL and the IAF.
- On 21 January 2021, India successfully test fired SAAW from the Hawk-i aircraft off the coast of Odisha.
- On 28 October 2021, IAF tested SAAW guided by GNSS at Pokhran range from Su-30MKI in dual rack pylon configuration.
- On 3 November 2021, DRDO and IAF tested SAAW. It was equipped with electro-optical seeker and imaging infrared, first of its class in India. The recent tests were carried out from a newly designed launcher.

== Production ==
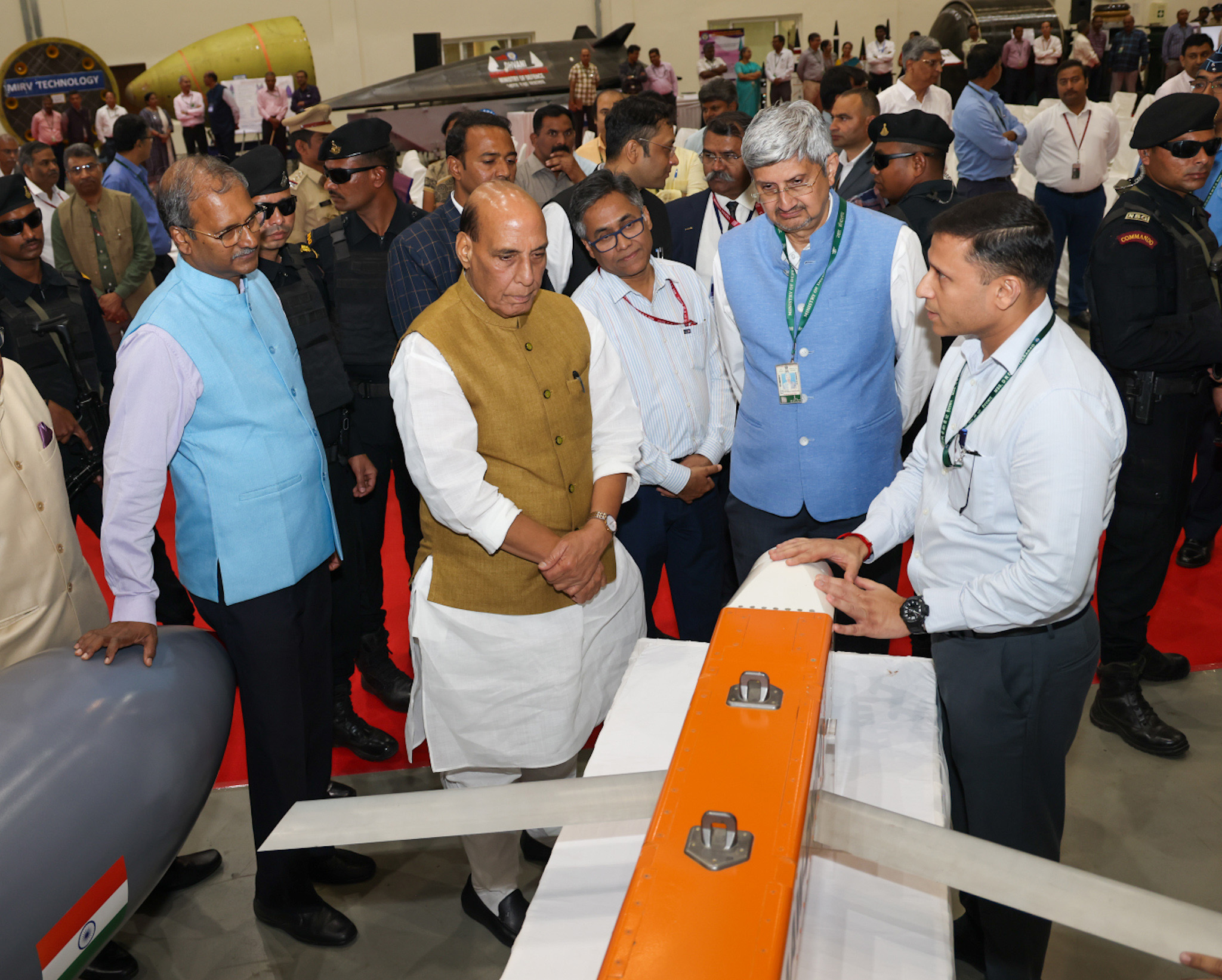
Defence Minister Rajnath Singh getting a briefing on capability of SAAW

On 15 December 2021, Minister of Defence Rajnath Singh handed over SAAW to IAF Chief Vivek Ram Chaudhari clearing way towards mass production. DRDO has partnered with Hindustan Aeronautics Limited and Bharat Dynamics Limited to manufacture of the SAAW.

On 23 September 2026, the Ministry of Defence placed an order for 160 Satellite Smart Anti Airfield Weapons (SAT-SAAW) for the Indian Air Force at ₹810.79 crore (US$87 million). These are expected to be delivered in 2027–28 and 2028–29.

== Operational history ==
During the 2025 India-Pakistan confrontation, the India Air Force employed the DRDO-developed Smart Anti-Airfield Weapon for the first time during Operation Sindoor, attacking Pakistani airfields. On 27 January 2026, while interacting with DRDO's top-performing scientists and technical personnel who were guests at the 77th Republic Day Parade, the Minister of Defence, Rajnath Singh, complimented the role of locally made weapons.

== Further development ==
Then DRDO chairman G. Satheesh Reddy disclosed that the next version of SAAW will be equipped with an IIR seeker and will begin developmental trials in 2022.

=== EO-SAAW ===
The Electro Optical SAAW is a long-range, autonomous air-to-surface guided bomb that uses imaging infrared seeker technology to guide its terminal phase. Release tests were carried out with a cooled IIR Mark-1 seeker in August 2023. The tests successfully proved the transfer of inertial navigation and satellite guidance to the IIR seeker in Lock-On-After-Launch mode, the execution of the scene matching algorithm, the correction of target location error, and the accurate hit of the target structure by the weapon from a high altitude release.

=== Turbojet variant ===
To convert SAAW from a precision-guided munition to an affordable air-launched cruise missile with capabilities comparable to BrahMos, DRDO began developing a turbojet variant in 2025 with a strike range of more than 200 km. While maintaining aerodynamic efficiency, it will be longer than the base model, measuring about 2.5 meters. It will be compatible with Dassault Rafale and Sukhoi Su-30MKI. With fire-and-forget capability, it will feature an EO/IIR seeker. While maintaining a circular error probability of less than three meters, it will autonomously track and hit its target after launch. In inclement weather, the seeker will guarantee both day and night operations against mobile targets. By the end of 2025, the trials will be over, assessing its performance in all weather conditions, accuracy, and range. Production will commence after it is successfully concluded.

== See also ==
- Anti-runway penetration bomb – Type of weapons
- BAP 100 – French anti-runway cluster bomb
- Gaurav
- JP233 – British submunitions system
- Matra Durandal – French anti-runway weapon
- Sudarshan laser-guided bomb
