= CBU-100 Cluster Bomb =

American cluster bomb

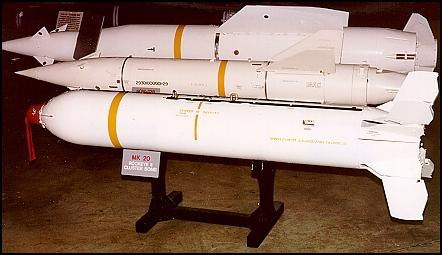
A CBU-99, foreground, along with an AGM-12B and an AGM-12C. The CBU-99 and CBU-100 are nearly identical.

The Mk 20 Rockeye II, CBU-99 Rockeye II, and CBU-100 Rockeye II comprise an American cluster bomb family which are employed primarily in an anti-tank mode against armored vehicles.

They are an air-launched, conventional free-fall, explosively opened, submunition dispensing, cluster bomb. They deploy 247 Mk 118 Rockeye submunitions, a HEAT bomblet, and weigh 489 lb (222 kg) as an assembled unit.

== Design ==
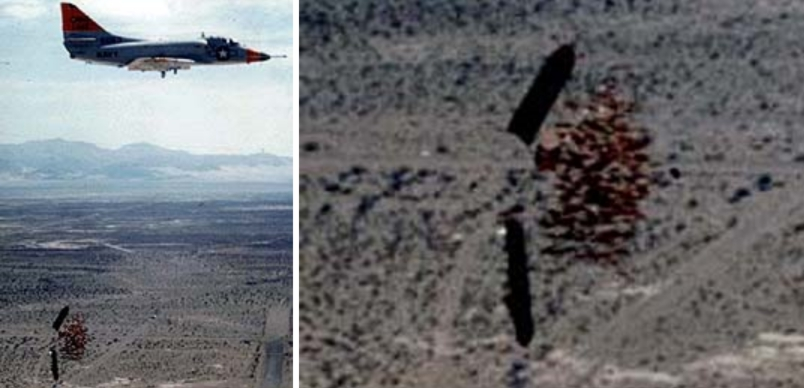
A CBU-100 Rockeye deployed by an A-4 Skyhawk that opens immediately after deployment drops 247 bomblets.

The CBUs are delivered to the fleet as completely assembled all-up-rounds. The cargo section of the Rockeye's Mk 7 bomb dispenser is the main structure of the weapon and contains the bombs/bomblets. A nose fairing is attached to the forward end of the cargo section for aerodynamics and fuze installation. It has an observation window for viewing the safe/arm indicator on the installed fuze. The dispenser has two linear-shaped charges secured longitudinally inside the walls. When initiated, these shaped charges cut the dispenser in half, from front to rear, and the bombs/bomblets spread in free-fall trajectories.

When the Mk 20 bomb cluster is released from the aircraft, the arming wires (primary and/or optional arming) are pulled sufficiently to arm the Mk 339 fuze (and recently the FMU-140 fuze) and release the fins. The positive armed fin release arming wire frees the fin release band, and the movable fins snap open by spring-force. Functioning of the fuze initiates the linear shaped charges in the dispenser which cut the dispenser case in half and disperse the bombs/bomblets.

When the Mk 339 Mod 1 primary fuse arming wire is pulled, the fuze will function 1.2 seconds after the arming wire has been extracted. If the pilot selects the option time (4.0 seconds), both the primary and option arming wires must be pulled. If the pilot selects the option time and the primary arming wire is not pulled, the fuze will fail to function and be a dud.

To stabilize the weapon after release from the aircraft, a tail cone assembly is attached to the aft end of the cargo section. The tail cone assembly houses four, spring-actuated folding fins. The fins are spring-loaded to the open position and secured in the closed position during ground handling by a fin release-band assembly. The fin release band is secured in the closed position by a safety cotter pin and by the fin release wire. A yellow band around the forward end of the cargo section indicates the explosive content of the weapon.

The Mk 7 Mods 3, 4, and 6 bomb dispensers have the Mk 339 Mod 1 fuze, which provides the pilot with in-flight selection of the fuze function time. The Mk 7 Mod 4 bomb dispenser differs from the Mk 7 Mod 3 by modifying the dispenser and giving interface capabilities with a wider range of military aircraft. The Mk 7 Mod 6 bomb dispenser is the same as the Mk 7 Mod 3 except that the outside of the Mod 6 cargo section is coated with a thermal protective coating and has an additional yellow band around the forward end of the cargo section. The addition of the thermal coating increases the overall weight of the Mod 6 to 505 pounds (229 kg).

Each bomblet weighs 1.32 pounds (600 g) and has a 0.4-pound (180 g) shaped-charge warhead of high explosives, which produces up to 250,000 psi (1.7 GPa) at the point of impact, allowing penetration of approximately 7.5 inches (190 mm) of armor. Rockeye is most efficiently used against area targets requiring penetration to kill.

The Mk 118 Mod 0 bomblet and Mk 118 Mod 1 bomblet only differ in the latter having faster arming after separation from the dispenser.

== Operational history ==
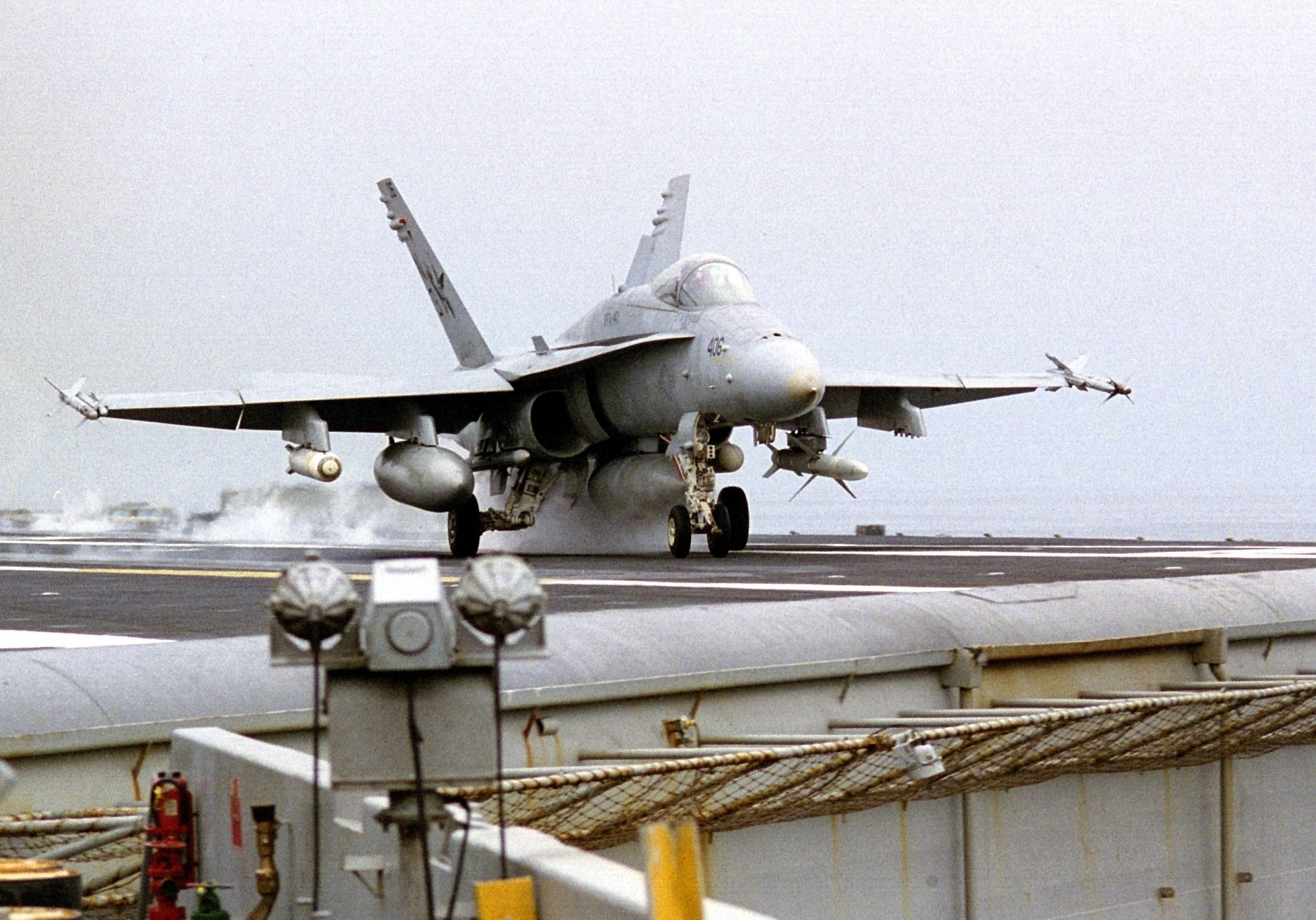
A US naval F/A-18C Hornet launches from USS Nimitz to a mission in Southern Iraq. Among other weapons, the plane carries CBU-100 Rockeye cluster bombs

Fielded in 1968, the Rockeye dispenser is also used in the Gator air-delivered mine system.

During Desert Storm US Marines used the weapon extensively, dropping 15,828 of the 27,987 total Rockeyes against armor, artillery, and personnel targets. The remainder were dropped by Air Force (5,346) and Navy (6,813) aircraft.

According to a test report conducted by the United States Navy's Weapon System Explosives Safety Review Board established in the wake of the 1967 USS Forrestal fire, the cooking off time for a Rockeye CBU is approximately 1 minute and 13 seconds.

== Variants ==
- Mk 20 Rockeye II, consists of 247 Mk 118 Mod 1 or Mod 2 anti-tank bomblets in an Mk 7 dispenser, with the dispenser ranging from Mk 7 Mod 2 to Mod 12
- CBU-99 Rockeye II, consists of 247 Mk 118 Mod 1 or Mod 2 anti-tank bomblets in an SUU-75 dispenser
- CBU-100 Rockeye II, consists of 247 Mk 118 Mod 1 or Mod 2 anti-tank bomblets in an SUU-76 dispenser
- Mk 7 dispenser as training version of the Mk 20, indicated by a single blue band

== Potential future users ==
In March 2023 Ukraine requested Mk 20 Rockeye II cluster bombs from the US to use the Mk 118 Rockeye bomblets as drone dropped munitions.
