= Anti-runway penetration bomb =

Explosive weapons designed to damage or destroy runways

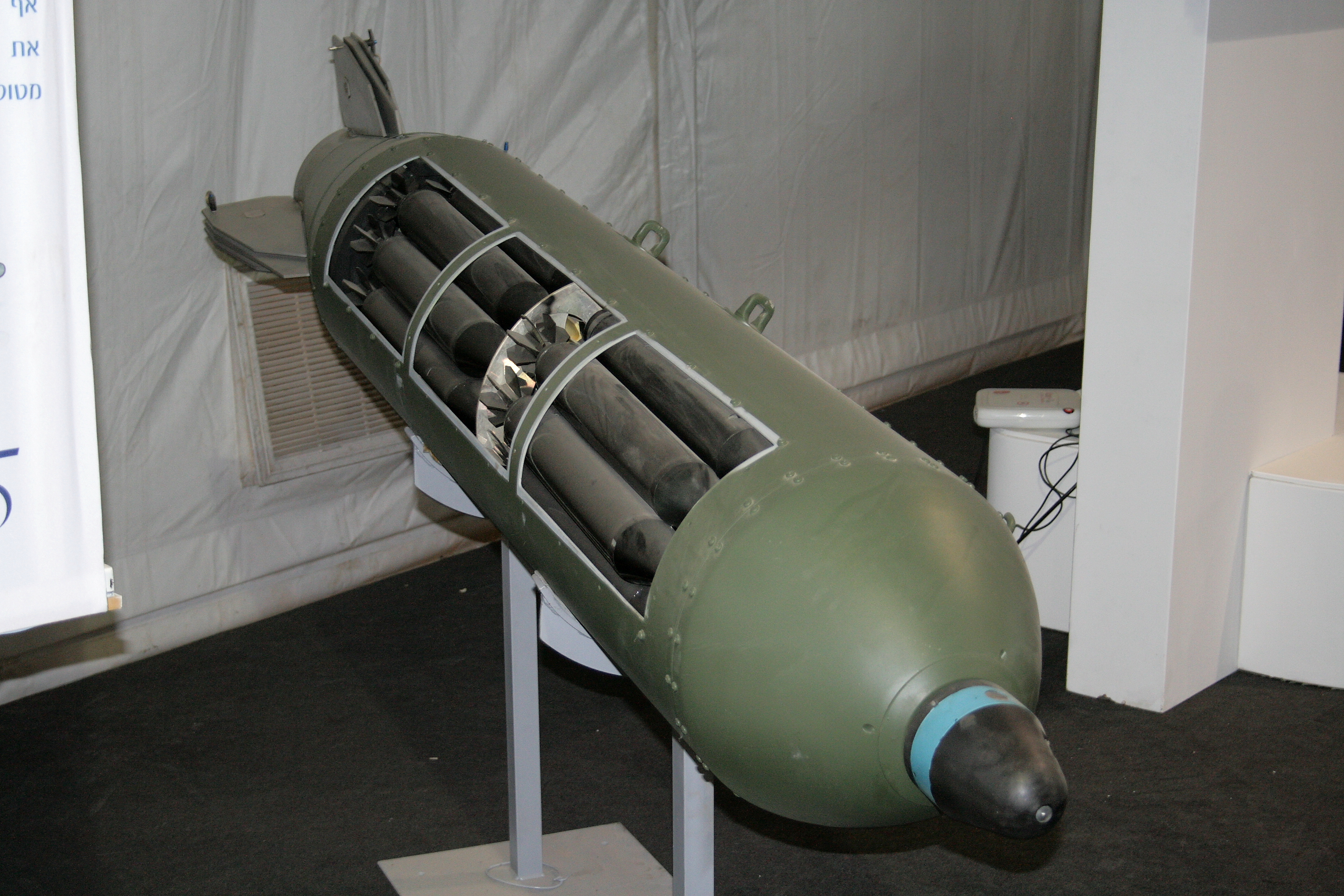
IMI modern Runway Attack Munition

Anti-runway penetration bombs are explosive weapons involving bombs or bomblets designed to damage or destroy runways, or otherwise render them unusable for aircraft.

Perhaps the most strategically decisive, best known, and first wartime use of specialized cratering anti-runway weapons was by Israel during the 1967 Six-Day War. The dibber bombs played a major part in the near complete destruction of the large Egyptian Air Force, mostly on the ground, in a preemptive strike on the first morning of the war by the commitment of the whole of the far smaller Israeli Air Force to the strike. The surprising elimination of the Egyptian, Syrian, Jordanian and Iraqi's air force and resulting Israeli air supremacy contributed significantly to the outcome of the war on all fronts. Before the war, France offered the IAF a $200,000-per-unit Runway Buster solution. It was too expensive for the country still in a recession. So, the head of the IAF Munition Development unit, Lieutenant Colonel Asher Peleg, met with the Head of Research and Development for the IMI, Avraham Makov. The two discussed how to find a solution locally. Within five days, they had their answer: an Israeli-designed Runway Buster that would only cost 2,000 Lira (the country's currency in 1967) to produce. It used rocket braking over the target and a second rocket burst to plunge through the runway surface and explode.

One system available from 1977 diverging from the French/Israeli runway piercing bomb concept used in 1967 is the Matra Durandal, a single 450 lb bomb with parachute braking, rocket booster, and two warheads. Dropped by aircraft flying at low level, it is braked by parachute, and when at the correct angle fires a rocket to impact the runway. It first ignites a large explosive charge to create a crater, and then uses a smaller charge that has penetrated the crater to displace adjacent concrete slabs. The slabs, once displaced, are far harder to deal with than a simple hole that can be patched with asphalt. The Durandal has been widely exported. The Durandal was used in 1991 by the United States Air Force in the initial stages of the Gulf War, delivered by General Dynamics F-111 Aardvarks against Iraqi airfields.

Another weapon, now withdrawn from service, was the British JP233; a dispenser and submunitions system. An aircraft would fly over the target runway and release a mixture of penetrating and anti-personnel submunitions to both crater the runway and impede repair work. The anti-personnel mines could be armed with time-delay fuses, threatening runway repair crews with the risk of death or bodily injury. After the UK signed an international accord in 1997, banning the production & use of anti-personnel mines, the JP233 was retired.

== See also ==
- Cluster bomb
- Smart Anti-Airfield Weapon
- Fares Scale of Injuries due to Cluster Munitions
