= BLG-252 =

BLG-252 is a Brazilian cluster bomb with a payload of 248 submunitions. Its effect is partially like an antitank munition, and partly like a mine.

== Operation ==
After release of a BLG-252, the bomb opens its covering shells. This activation is controlled by a charge that is driven by mechanical time fuses located on the warhead and tail of the main bomb. Dispersion of the submunitions is obtained as a function of the rotation acquired by the bomb after the release, determining the effectiveness area.
