= Blohm & Voss BV 237 =

German aircraft

General information
- Type: Dive bomber, attack aircraft
- National origin: Germany
- Manufacturer: Blohm & Voss
- Designer: Dr. Richard Vogt
- Number built: None completed

History
- Developed from: Blohm & Voss BV 141

The Blohm & Voss BV 237 was a German proposed dive bomber with an unusual asymmetric design based on the Blohm & Voss BV 141.

== Design and development ==
In 1942, the Luftwaffe was interested in replacing the venerable but ageing Junkers Ju 87, and Dr. Richard Vogt's design team at Blohm & Voss began work on project P 177. The dive bomber version would have had a one-man crew with two fixed forward firing 15 mm (0.591 in) MG 151 cannon and two rear firing 13 mm (0.512 in) MG 131 machine guns, carrying 2,000 kg (4,400 lb) of bombs.

A two-seat ground attack version was also proposed with two fixed forward firing 15 mm (0.591 in) MG 151 cannon, three forward firing 30 mm (1.181 in) MK 103 cannon with six 70 kg (150 lb) bombs.

A final B-1 type was to incorporate a Junkers Jumo 004B turbojet engine in a third nacelle slung underneath the wing, between the piston engine and the cockpit.

In early 1943 the B&V design, now called the BV 237, was shown to Hitler and he ordered it into production. However the order was not carried out. In the summer, Allied bombing raids over Hamburg caused no damage to the Blohm and Voss facilities, but the Ministry of Aviation ordered all developmental work stopped. Work continued later and it was determined that construction could begin in mid 1945, but plans for a pre-production A-0 series were abandoned, leaving the project at the pre-production stage near the end of 1944, with only a wooden mock-up completed.

== Variants ==
P.177: Original project which led to the BV 237.

BV 237 (single seat)
A single seat Sturzkampfflugzeug (dive bomber) armed with two fixed forward firing 15 mm (0.591 in) MG 151 cannon and two rear firing 13 mm (0.512 in) MG 131 machine guns, carrying 2,000 kg (4,400 lb) of bombs.

BV 237 (2-seat)

A twin seater Schlachtflugzeug (ground attack) aircraft armed with two fixed forward firing 15 mm (0.591 in) MG 151 cannon and three forward firing 30 mm (1.181 in) MK 103 cannon, with six 70 kg (150 lb) bombs.

BV 237B-1

A proposed mixed-power version with a podded Junkers Jumo 004B underslung between the BMW 801 nacelle and the fuselage.

== Specifications (BV 237) ==
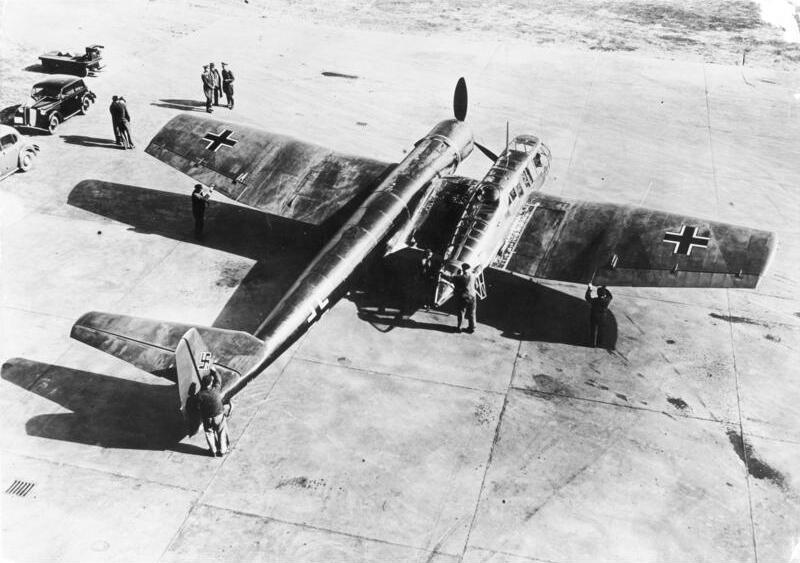
BV 141 in May 1942. The BV 237 would have had a similar appearance.

Data from Die Deutsche Luftruestung 1933-1945 Vol.1 - AEG-Dornier

General characteristics

- Crew: 1
- Length: 10.75 m (35 ft 3 in)
- Wingspan: 14.46 m (47 ft 5 in)
- Height: 3.3 m (10 ft 10 in)
- Wing area: 42 m^{2} (450 sq ft)
- Max takeoff weight: 6,685 kg (14,738 lb)
- Fuel capacity: 1,900 L (418 imp gal; 502 US gal)
- Powerplant: 1 × BMW 801D 14 cyl 2-row Air cooled radial piston engine, 1,300 kW (1,700 hp) 2-seat
- Powerplant: 1 × Junkers Jumo 004B axial flow turbojet engine, 8.22 kN (1,850 lbf) thrust BV 237B-1 only
- Propellers: 3-bladed VDM

Performance

- Maximum speed: 579 km/h (360 mph, 313 kn)
- Range: 2,000 km (1,200 mi, 1,100 nmi)

Armament

- Guns: *2x15 mm (0.591 in) MG 151 cannon - Sturzkampfflugzeug / Schlachtflugzeug

and

- 2x rear firing 13 mm (0.512 in) MG 131 machine guns - Sturzkampfflugzeug / Schlachtflugzeug
- 3x forward firing 30 mm (1.181 in) MK 103 cannon - Schlachtflugzeug
- Bombs: * 2,000 kg (4,400 lb) of bombs - Sturzkampfflugzeug
- 6x 70 kg (150 lb) bombs - Schlachtflugzeug

== See also ==
- List of German aircraft projects, 1939–45
