= Stepless =

Meanings of Stepless include:

- Stepless access, e.g. in a Low-floor tram
- Stepless (aircraft), an aircraft design
- Stepless automatic transmission, e.g. Variomatic
