= MK 108 cannon =

WWII-era German 30mm aircraft autocannon

MK 108
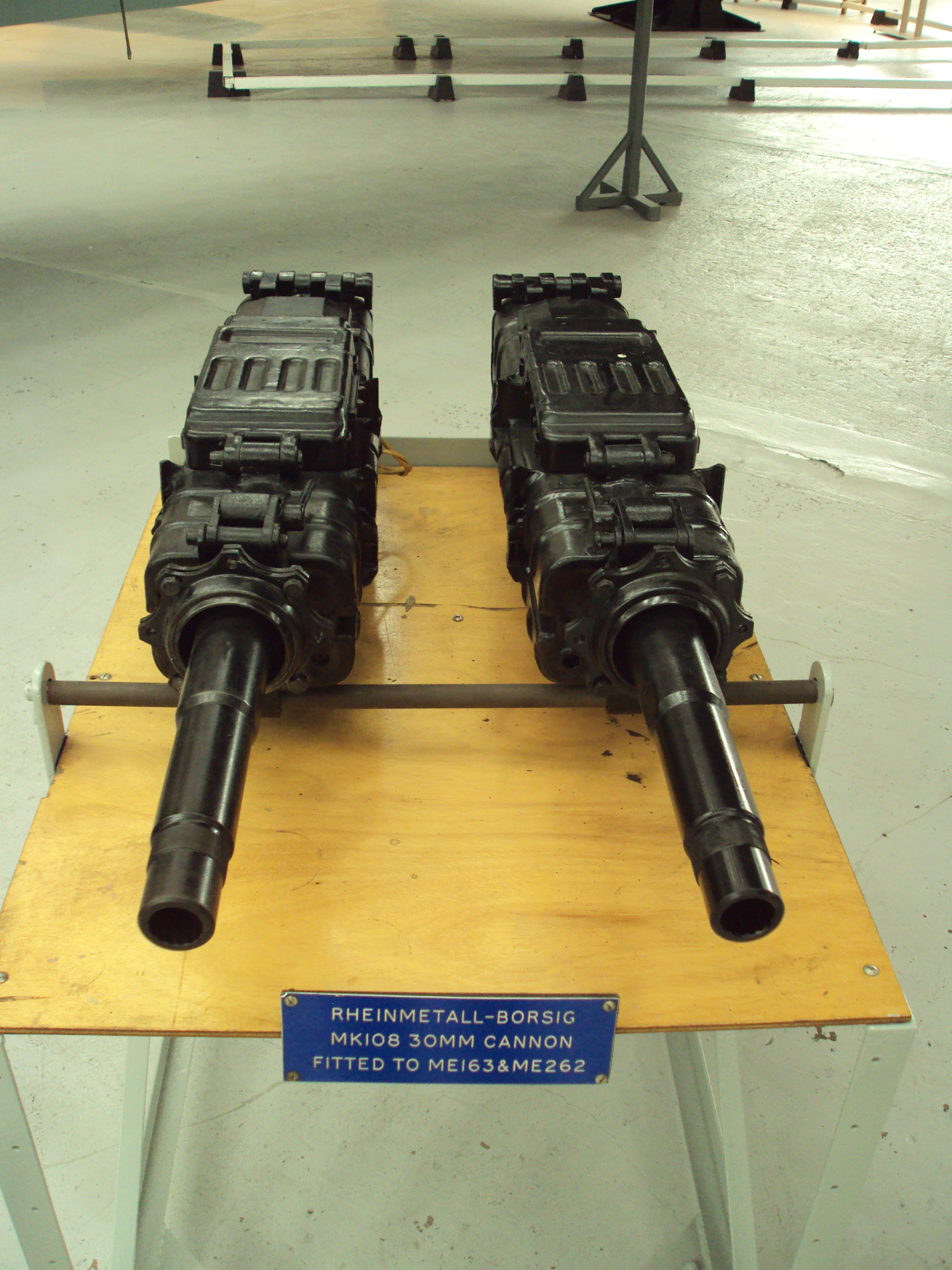
- Two MK 108 autocannon, RAF Museum Cosford (2010)
- Type: Autocannon
- Place of origin: Nazi Germany

Service history
- In service: 1943–1945
- Used by: Nazi Germany
- Wars: World War II

Production history
- Designer: Rheinmetall-Borsig
- Designed: 1940
- Manufacturer: Rheinmetall-Borsig
- Produced: 1943–1945

Specifications
- Mass: 58 kilograms (128 lb)
- Length: 1,057 millimetres (41.6 in)
- Barrel length: 580 millimetres (23 in)
- Cartridge: 30×90mmRB (330g) steel casing
- Caliber: 30 mm
- Action: API blowback
- Rate of fire: 650 rounds/min MK 108A: 850 rounds/min
- Muzzle velocity: 500 m/s (1640 ft/s)

The MK 108 (German: Maschinenkanone—"machine cannon") is a 30 mm caliber autocannon manufactured in Germany during World War II by Rheinmetall‑Borsig for use in aircraft.

== Development ==
The weapon was developed as a private venture by the company in 1940 and was submitted to the Reichsluftfahrtministerium (RLM—Reich Aviation Ministry) in response to a 1942 requirement for a heavy aircraft weapon for use against the Allied heavy bombers appearing over German-controlled regions by then. Testing verified that the autocannon was well suited to this role, requiring on average just four hits with its 85g RDX-load (in a 330g shell) and a resulting strongly brisant high-explosive ammunition, to bring down a heavy bomber such as a B-17 Flying Fortress or B-24 Liberator, and just a single "shattering" hit to down a fighter. In comparison, the otherwise excellent 20 mm MG 151/20 (18g of HE in a 92g shell) required about 15 to 20 hits to down a B-17.

The MK 108 was quickly ordered into production and was installed in a variety of Luftwaffe fighter aircraft. It saw first operational service in summer 1943 with the Bf 110G-2 bomber destroyers and in the Bf 109G-6/U4.

== Design details ==
=== Ammunition ===
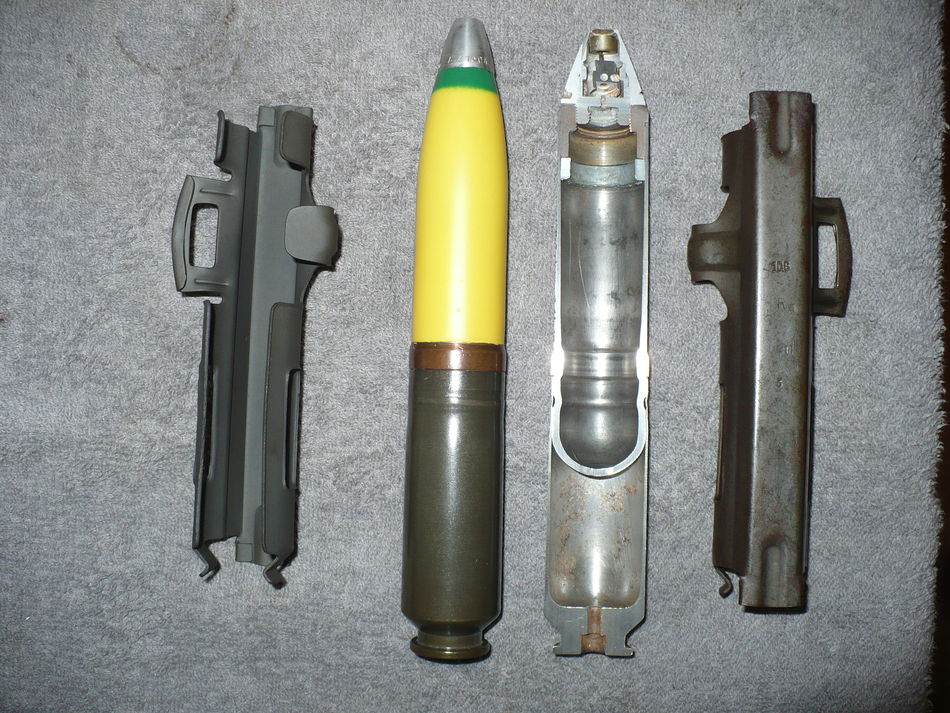
30x90RB ammunition, as used in the MK 108 Machine Cannon

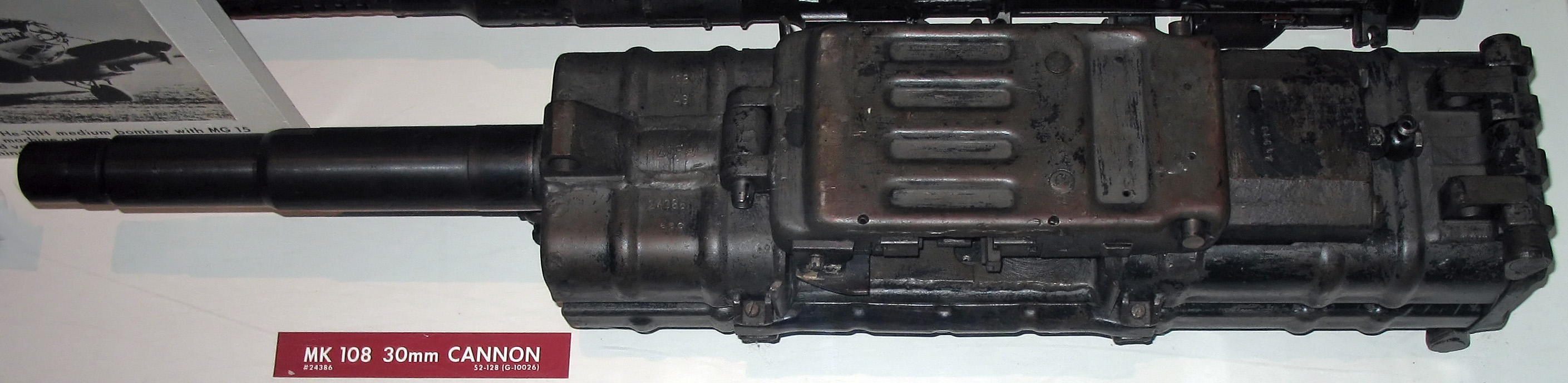
Side view, MK 108

The cannon used specially developed 30×90RB mm ammunition—30 mm calibre, 90 mm case length, rebated/reduced rim. Unlike most other weapon rounds, which used traditional brass for the case, the MK 108's ammunition used steel cases. Several types of ammunition were developed, including practice, armor-piercing, high-explosive and incendiary. In operation, however, two major ammunition types were used: mine shell and high-explosive incendiary. The mine shell was made by drawn steel (the same way brass cartridge-cases are made) instead of being forged and machined as was the usual practice for cannon shells. This resulted in a shell with a thin but strong wall, which hence had a much larger cavity in which to pack a much larger explosive or incendiary charge than was otherwise possible.

=== Construction ===
The cannon proved to be relatively light, effective, reliable, compact and easy to manufacture due to its simple construction—80% of the weapon was made from stamped parts, and the number of moving parts was kept to a minimum by using advanced primer ignition blowback (APIB) operation. The simplicity of construction allowed inexperienced workers to make the parts (mostly women).

The MK 108 was optimized for a high rate of fire at the expense of ballistic performance. It was easy to maintain, and its compact size, low weight and electrical priming made it ideal for aircraft installation.

The cannon's distinctive heavy pounding sound and high rate of fire gave it the nickname "pneumatic hammer" amongst Allied aircrews, who feared its destructive power.

=== Mechanism ===
Normally, gas-operated or recoil-operated mechanisms are used in automatic weapons of rifle calibre and larger because the chamber pressure in such weapons is very high. Therefore, if a simple blowback system (where there is no positive lock between the bolt and barrel) is used, the bolt may recoil and open the breech while the chamber pressure is still high, causing damage to the weapon and split cases. To avoid this, simple blowback guns have to use low-powered cartridges or a very heavy bolt, as discussed in blowback article.

In an Advanced Primer Ignition Blowback design such as the MK 108, the forward motion of the bolt is used instead of a locking mechanism to prevent this premature opening. When the 108 is ready to fire, the bolt and main spring are held back at the rear of the gun, the spring under considerable tension. When the trigger is squeezed, they are released and shoot forward at a high speed. The bolt picks up a cartridge and chambers it, but instead of coming to rest against the breech face, it follows the case a small distance into the chamber—which is of course made specially longer in these guns to accommodate this manoeuvre. Also a cartridge case with a rebated rim is used, so that the extractor claw can hook over the rim and still fit within the chamber.

Primer ignition is timed so that the bolt is still moving forward when the propellant is ignited. The expanding gases from the fired round stop the forward motion of the bolt, then reverse its motion. The key characteristic of the APIB system is that, because the resistance due to the weight of the bolt and the mainspring are supplemented by the bolt's considerable forward momentum, the propellant gases are contained in the barrel for critical microseconds, and the projectile will have had time to leave the muzzle, allowing the gas to escape forward and reducing the chamber pressure to a safe level before the bolt and cartridge case emerge from the opposite end. Once they emerge the weapon cycles like other automatic guns, with one significant exception: instead of simply ejecting the spent cartridge case, the 108 reinserts it into the empty link in the ammunition belt. The heavy bolt continues backwards, compressing the main spring. When the spring is fully compressed it begins to expand forwards again, reversing the motion of the bolt and recommencing the cycle. This sequence is repeated until the trigger is released or the ammunition is exhausted.

The APIB design makes practical the use of far more powerful ammunition than with simple blowback operation, but the length and the speed of the bolt's movement within the chamber are limited by the stresses placed on the case by the sliding motion, which takes place under high gas pressure. To keep these within limits either the bolt must be heavy to absorb the pressure, or the barrel must be short to limit the duration of high pressure within the barrel. The operational tradeoff is that a heavy bolt reduces the rate of fire while a short barrel reduces ballistic performance. The designers of the MK 108 opted for a high rate of fire and thus used a relatively light bolt, accepting reduced ballistic performance due to the corresponding necessity of a short barrel. As a result, the MK 108 had a muzzle velocity of only 500 m/s, compared to the approx. 720-790m/s for the MG 151/20 but a fire rate of 600-850 rounds per minute depending on variant.

Another significant feature is that, in the APIB system the cycle starts with the bolt open, which prevents an autocannon using the APIB principle from being accurately synchronized with an aircraft's propeller.

MK 108 bolt cycle

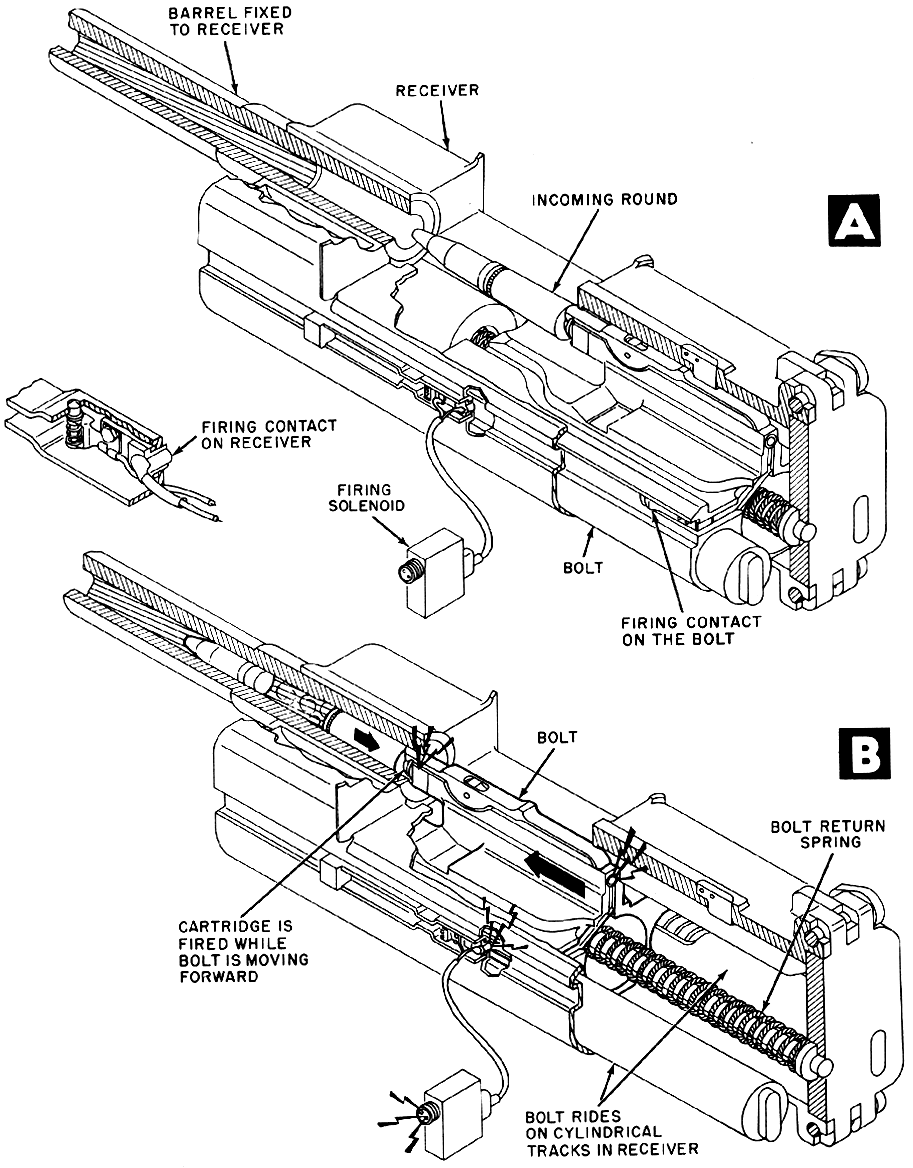

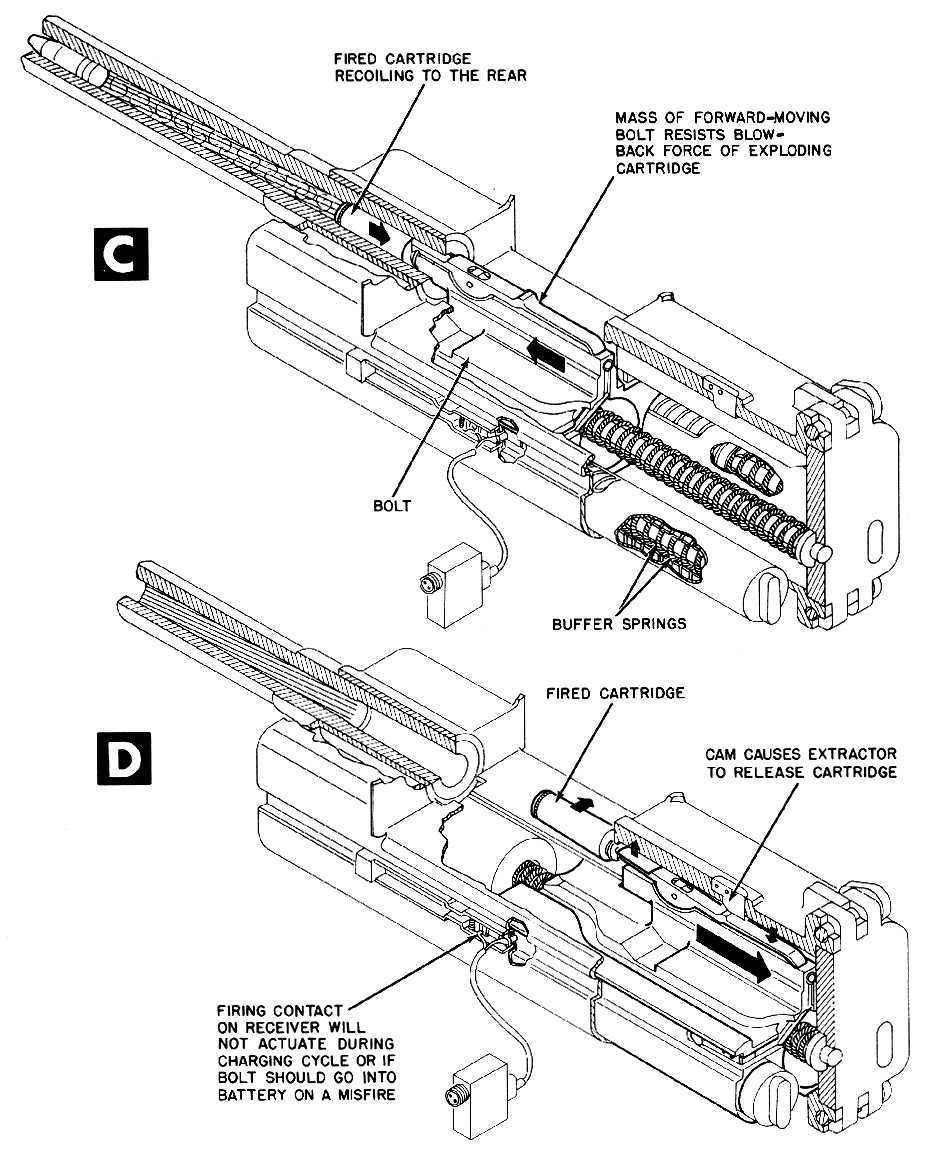
MK 108 feed cycle

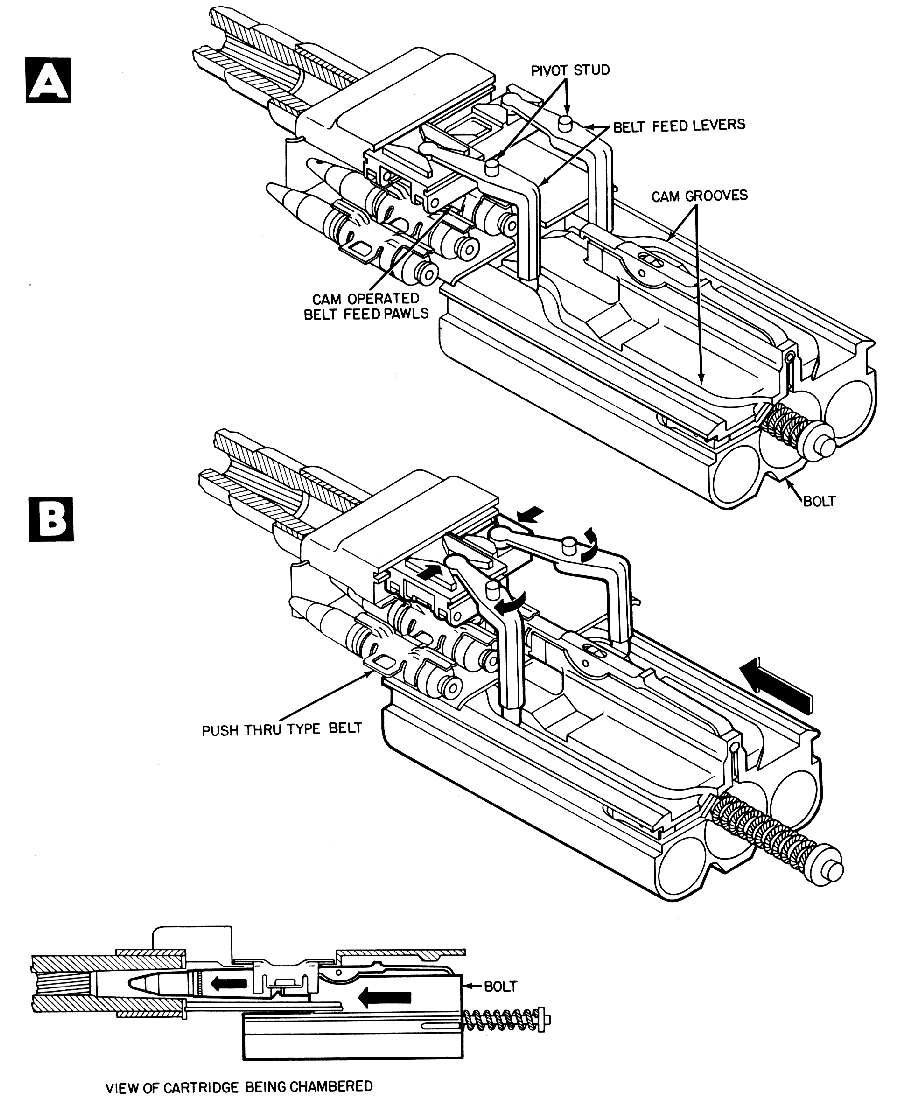

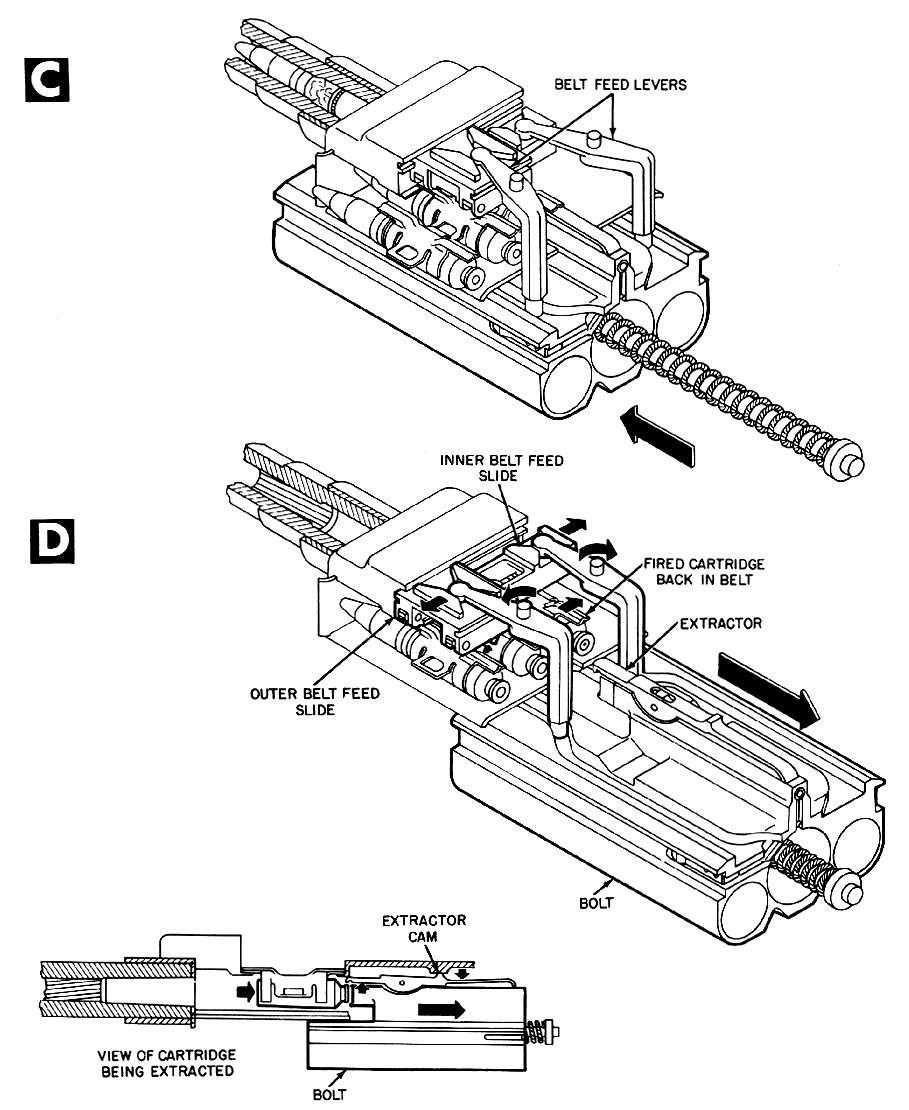

== Operational usage ==
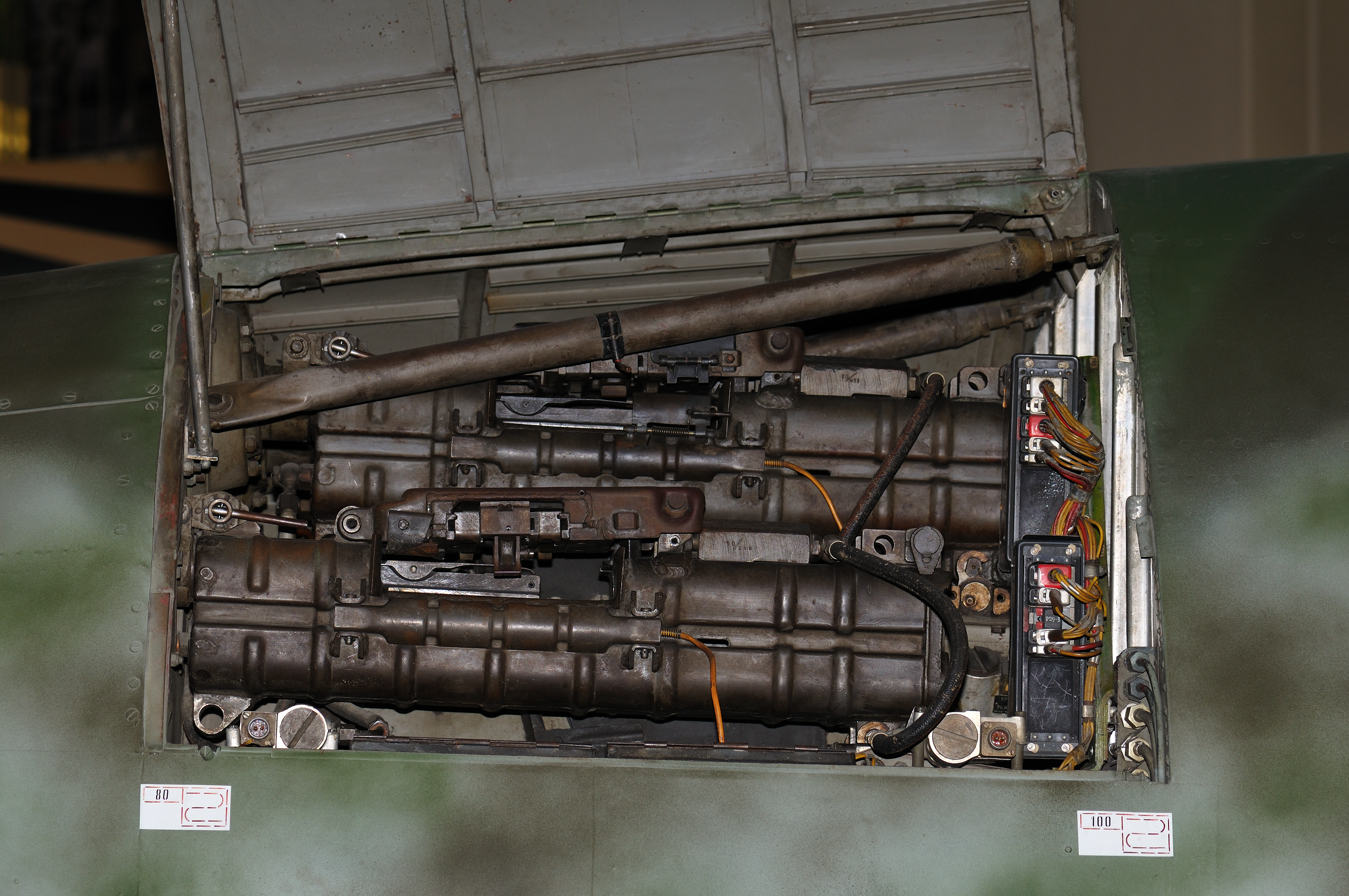
Left pair in an Me 262

The MK 108 first saw widespread use among fighters tasked with shooting down enemy bombers. It usually was a modification in the form of a Rüstsatz. A well known example is the Fw190A-8/r2 that was built and deployed specifically for attacks on bombers. Some of the aircraft deploying, or intended to be armed with, the MK 108 were Messerschmitt Bf 109, Messerschmitt Bf 110, Messerschmitt Me 163, Messerschmitt Me 262, Focke-Wulf Fw 190, Focke-Wulf Ta 152, Focke-Wulf Ta 154, Heinkel He 162, Heinkel He 219, Horten Ho 229 and Junkers Ju 388.

The MK 108 was also fitted to night fighters in an unusual installation, called "Schräge Musik" (literally "awkward music" or "slanted music"). In this configuration, the cannons were mounted in the fuselage, aiming upwards and slightly forwards at an oblique (18 to 30 degree) angle, depending on fitment and aircraft. This allowed the night fighter to attack bombers, often undetected, by approaching from underneath the enemy aircraft - many British heavy bombers had neither weapons on the ventral fuselage nor windows for vision. This installation was so effective that discovery and news of its adoption was much slower than usual in reaching British night-bombing forces, as there were rarely any survivors from the attacks to report the new threat. This system was fitted to some versions of the He 219 Uhu, late-model Bf 110 night fighters, Junkers Ju 88 & 388 and the Dornier Do 217N model. It was also fitted more rarely to the (prototype) Focke-Wulf Ta 154 and Fw 189 along with the planned, two-seat Me 262B-2 jet night-fighter. In the latter case this produced a jet fighter with six MK108 cannons - with the fitment of the projected mass-produced, mid-VHF band FuG 218 radar.

== Related designs ==
MK 112

Production history
- Designer: Rheinmetall-Borsig
- No. built: 15 (prototypes)
- Variants: 2

Specifications
- Mass: 300 kilograms (660 lb); 275 kilograms (606 lb) (improved version)
- Length: 2,012 millimetres (79.2 in)
- Cartridge: 55×175RBmm (1485 g)
- Caliber: 55 mm
- Action: API blowback
- Rate of fire: 300 rounds/min
- Muzzle velocity: 594 m/s (1,950 ft/s)

The MK 108 mechanism was scaled up in the MK 112 cannon, using a 55×175RB cartridge. The MK 112 was intended to be fitted in pairs in the nose of Me 262 fighters, with 25 rounds per gun, and also in the nose of later models of the Arado Ar 234 for night fighter duty. Underwing mounts for the twin-engined, high-speed Dornier Do 335 heavy fighter were in development as well. The gun was not finished in time to see operations in World War II. Only 15 prototypes were built; of these 10 were delivered for tests and 5 were kept at the factory for improvements based on expected feedback. Of the ten guns delivered for tests, seven were of an early model, weighing 300 kg (660 lb), and three were lighter at 275 kg (606 lb) — these were both significantly lighter than the slightly smaller, 50-mm calibre, 21-round armed Bordkanone-series BK 5 cannon, itself weighing some 540 kg (1,190 lb). The MK 112's projectile was supposed to weigh 1.5 kg (3.3 lb); of these, 420 g (15 oz) were reserved for the explosive. The US captured some of these prototypes and knowledge gleaned from them was incorporated into the experimental US 57 mm T78 autocannon, but this did not see production either.

== See also ==
- List of API blowback firearms
- MK 101 cannon
- MK 103 cannon
- MK 115 cannon
