= Focke-Wulf Fw 189 Uhu =

German twin-engine twin-boom reconnaissance aircraft

Fw 189 Uhu
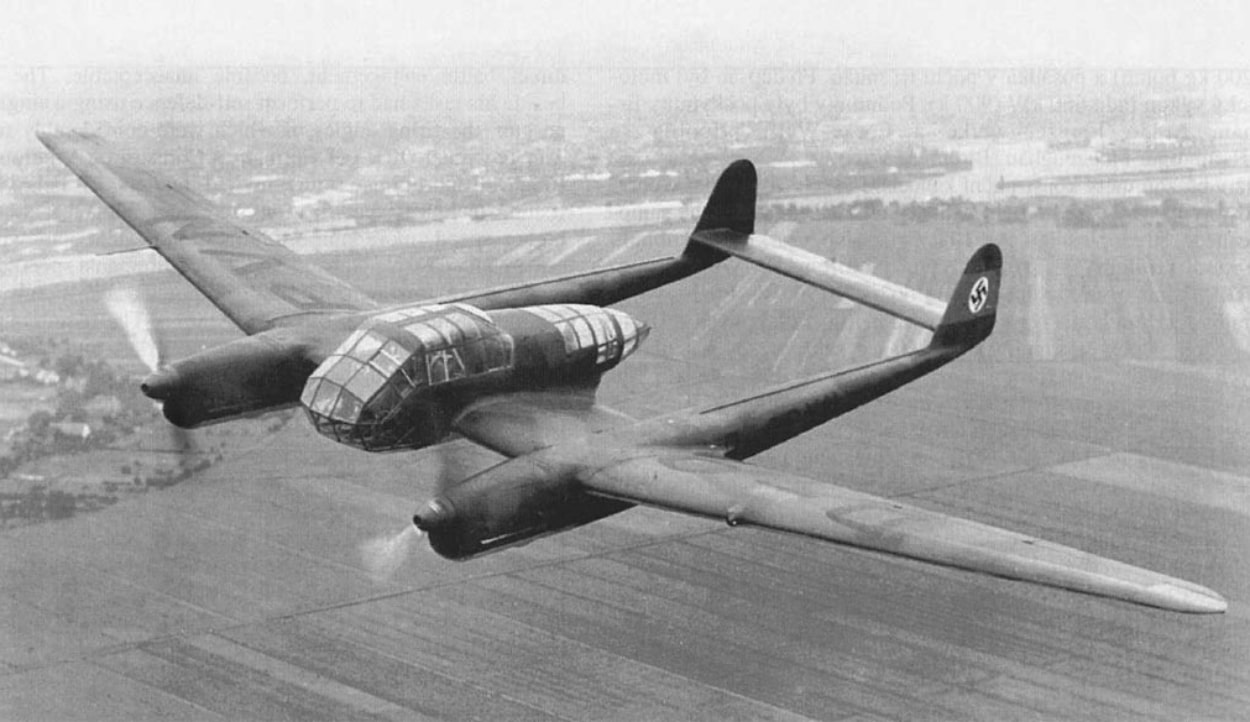

General information
- Type: Tactical reconnaissance and army cooperation aircraft, light bomber
- Manufacturer: Focke-Wulf
- Designer: Kurt Tank
- Primary users: Luftwaffe: Hungarian Air Force; Slovak Air Force
- Number built: 864

History
- Manufactured: 1940–1944
- Introduction date: August 1941
- First flight: July 1938
- Retired: 1945

The Focke-Wulf Fw 189 Uhu (Eurasian eagle-owl) is a twin-engine twin-boom tactical reconnaissance and army cooperation aircraft designed and produced by the German aircraft manufacturer Focke-Wulf. It was one of the Luftwaffe's most prominent short range reconnaissance aircraft during the Second World War.

The Fw 189 was developed during the late 1930s to fulfil a specification issued by the Reichsluftfahrtministerium (RLM) for an advanced short-range reconnaissance aircraft to succeed the Henschel Hs 126 in the tactical support role provided by the Luftwaffe to the Wehrmacht. While Arado Flugzeugwerke (Arado) had responded with the conventional Arado Ar 198, Focke-Wulf's design team, headed by the aeronautical engineer Kurt Tank, produced the unconventional Fw 189, a twin-boom aircraft with a central crew gondola with a glazed stepless cockpit. During July 1938, the first prototype performed its maiden flight; early testing of the Fw 189 demonstrated its superiority over the Ar 198, and thus the RLM backed its development and subsequent quantity production.

During 1940, the Fw 189 entered service with the Luftwaffe. It was much in use on the Eastern Front against the Soviet Union, where it was used for reconnaissance role, as a light bomber and as a night fighter. The Fw 189 was also used on other fronts. Production of the type took place at the Focke-Wulf factory at Bremen, the Bordeaux-Merignac aircraft factory in occupied France, and the Aero Vodochody aircraft factory in Prague, Protectorate of Bohemia and Moravia. Further development and production of the type continued until mid-1944, at which point production was terminated to concentrate on fighters.

== Design and development ==
Work on what would become the Fw 189 can be traced back to February 1937 and the issuing of a specification by the German Reichsluftfahrtministerium (RLM) that called for a short-range reconnaissance aircraft that had a three-man crew and provided all-round visibility; it was also specified that the aircraft should possess about 850–900 hp (630–670 kW) of power. An important function of the Luftwaffe was to provide tactical support to the Wehrmacht; the envisioned aircraft was intended to be an advanced successor to the Henschel Hs 126, which had only just started service trials. This specification was issued to both Arado and Focke-Wulf.

Arado opted to respond with the relatively conventional Ar 198, which was a single-engined high-wing monoplane with a glazed gondola underneath the fuselage. Focke-Wulf's chief designer Kurt Tank had opted for a distinctive twin-boom configuration for what would become the Fw 189; it was also powered by a pair of Argus As 410 engines instead of the expected single engine. As a "twin-boom" design, akin to the earlier Dutch Fokker G.I, the Fw 189 used a central crew gondola, which for the Fw 189 would be designed with a glazed and framed stepless cockpit forward section, which used no separate windscreen panels for the pilot (as with many German medium bombers from 1938). The Fw 189 had as part of its defensive armament, a novel rear-gun emplacement designed by the Ikaria-Werke: a rotating conical rear "turret" of sorts, manually rotated with a metal-framed, glazed conical fairing streamlining its shape, with the open section providing the firing aperture for either a single or twin machine-gun at the unit's circular-section forward mount. As a private venture Blohm & Voss proposed something even more radical, chief designer Dr. Richard Vogt's unique asymmetric Blohm & Voss BV 141.

The BV 141 and Fw 189 submissions were reportedly received by RLM officials with a degree of unease due to their unconventional approaches. During April 1937, orders were placed for three prototypes each of the Arado and Focke-Wulf designs. That month, construction of the first prototype Fw 189 commenced. In July 1938, it performed its maiden flight, the pilot being Tank. The aircraft possessed favourable flight characteristics. One month later, it was followed by the second prototype, the principal difference between the two being that the second prototype was armed, carrying two MG 17 and three MG 15 machine guns along with underwing bombracks capable of carrying up to four 50 kg (110 lb) bombs. The third prototype was outfitted with specially designed Argus variable-pitch propellers that automatically changed pitch via the vanes on the spinner. In contrast to the smooth testing of the Fw 189, the Ar 198 exhibited comparatively cumbersome and unsatisfactory performance.

Recognising the Fw 189 as the winner, Focke-Wulf received a development contract from the RLM for four additional prototypes. The first of these four aircraft was representative of the production standard Fw 189A, being powered by a pair of Argus As 410A-1 V-12 inverted piston engines, capable of generating up to 465 PS (459 hp; 342 kW) and a reduced defensive armament comprising only two machine guns. The next aircraft prototype was a forerunner of the Fw 189B, featuring more refined aerodynamic shaping of the fuselage along with a more conventional stepped cockpit. In mid 1939, the RLM ordered another 13 aircraft, all of which were delivered to the Luftwaffe by March 1940.

During late 1939, Focke-Wulf withdrew the first prototype from the flight test programme to adapt it into their response to a request from the RLM for a dedicated close air support aircraft. The original fuselage nacelle was replaced by a compact armoured counterpart; largely due to the increased weight, it handled poorly. While this version was formally evaluated, the competing Henschel Hs 129 was selected instead, partly due to its smaller size and reduced production cost.

The Fw 189 was mass produced at the Focke-Wulf factory in Bremen, at the Bordeaux-Merignac aircraft factory (Avions Marcel Bloch's factory, which became Dassault Aviation after the war) in occupied France and at the Aero Vodochody aircraft factory in Prague, Protectorate of Bohemia and Moravia. By mid-1942, production of the Fw 189 at Bremen had ended as resources were concentrated on the Focke-Wulf Fw 190 fighter instead. While the company's design team continued to work on advanced variants of the Fw 189 into early 1944, production of the type was permanently ended in mid-1944 in response to Germany's declining military situation, which compelled the termination of various aircraft programmes to concentrate resources. Total production of the type came to 864 aircraft of all variants.

== Operational history ==
During early 1940, Luftwaffe pilots commenced training on the type, initially using the pre-production Fw 189s exclusively and supplemented by five-seat Fw 189B-1 trainers from the summer of 1940. While operational trials of the type were quite successful, Luftwaffe officials concluded that there was little advantage to withdrawing the existing Hs 126s in favour of Fw 189s. Instead, the service decided to introduce the type relatively slowly, thus the Fw 189 was not operational at any meaningful quantity until the summer of 1942. This delay did allow for some refinements to the aircraft, particularly its airframe, to be performed during 1941; modifications around this time included desert survival gear and floats. The first unit to re-equip with the type being on the Eastern Front.

Called the Fliegendes Auge (Flying Eye) of the German Army, the Fw 189 was used extensively on the Eastern Front. By September 1942, 172 Fw 189s were reportedly operational on this front, making up the majority of all short range reconnaissance aircraft present. It was nicknamed "Rama" ("frame" in the Russian, Ukrainian and Polish languages) by Soviet forces, referring to its distinctive tail boom, fin and elevator shapes, giving it a quadrangular appearance. Despite its low speed and fragile looks, the Fw 189's manoeuvrability made it a difficult target for Soviet fighters. The Fw 189 was often able to out-turn attacking fighters by flying in a tight circle into which enemy fighters could not follow. The Fw 189 also saw service on other fronts, including the Middle East.

Night Reconnaissance Group 15, attached to the 4th Panzerarmee in southern Poland during late 1944, carried out nocturnal reconnaissance and light bombing sorties with a handful of Fw 189A-1s. These aircraft typically lacked the main dorsal machine gun. Small numbers of A-1s were used as night fighters in the closing weeks of the conflict – the aircraft were modified by having their reconnaissance equipment removed and then fitted with FuG 212 AI radar in the nose and a single obliquely-firing 20 mm MG FF autocannon in the common Schräge Musik upwards/forward-firing offensive fitment also used for heavier German night fighters, like the Bf 110G. For the Fw 189 the installation was in the crew nacelle in the space where the rear dorsal gun was normally housed. The majority of the nachtjager Fw 189s was operated by NJG 100, were based at Greifswald. Chronic fuel shortages and enemy air superiority over the Fw 189 defence area (chiefly Berlin) meant that few aircraft were shot down by these aircraft.

== Variants ==
The main production model was the Fw 189A reconnaissance plane, built mostly in two variants, the A-1 and A-2. Unless otherwise stated all aircraft were powered by two Argus As 410 engines of 465 PS (459 hp, 342 kW).

- Fw 189A-0: Ten preproduction aircraft for operational tests and trials.
- Fw 189A-1: Initial production version, armed with two flexible 7.92 mm (.312 in) MG 15 machine guns in the dorsal and rear positions, one 7.92 mm (0.312 in) MG 17 machine gun in each wing root, plus four 50 kg (110 lb) bombs. It could carry an Rb 20/30 or an Rb 50/30 aerial camera.
- Fw 189A-1 trop: Tropicalised version of the Fw 189 A-1, fitted with air intake filters and survival equipment. Conversion from A-1s.

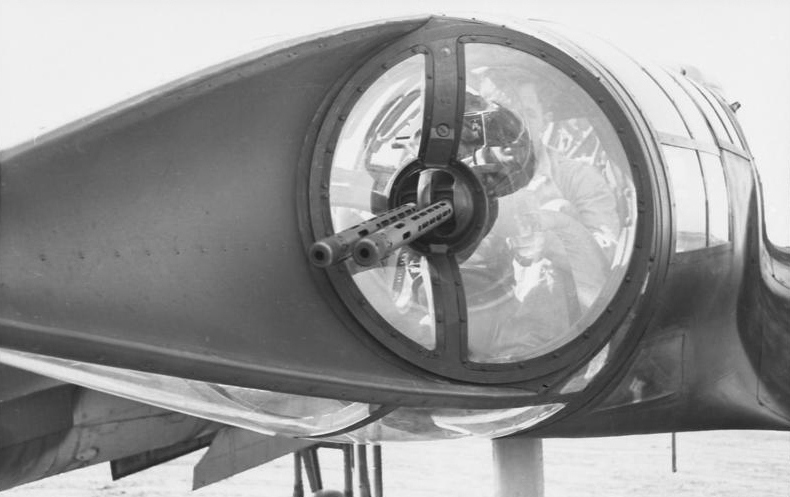
Close up view of a rotatable, Ikaria-designed twin barrel machine gun mounting in the crew nacelle's tail cone.

- Fw 189A-1/U2: VIP transport version of the Fw 189 A-1.
- Fw 189A-1/U3: VIP transport version of the Fw 189 A-1.
- Fw 189A-2: The flexible MG 15s were replaced by twin-barrel 7.92 mm (0.312 in) MG 81Z.
- Fw 189A-3: Tropicalised production version of the Fw 189 A-2, fitted with air intake filters and survival equipment.
- Fw 189A-4: Light ground-attack version, armed with two 20 mm MG 151/20 cannons in each wing root, fitted with armour protection for the underside of the fuselage, engines and fuel tanks. No production known.

The Fw 189B was a five-seat training aircraft; only 13 were built.

- Fw 189B-0: Three preproduction aircraft.
- Fw 189B-1: Five-seat training version. ten built.

The Fw 189C was conceived as a heavily armoured ground-attack, close-support variant, in competition with the Henschel Hs 129. But its two prototypes (V1b and V6) were not satisfactory, and it was not produced.

- Fw 189D: Proposed twin-float trainer floatplane. Not built.
- Fw 189E: Prototype only, powered by two 700 PS (690 hp, 515 kW) Gnome-Rhone 14M radial engines.
- Fw 189F-1: Re-engined Fw 189 A-1 aircraft, powered by two 600 PS (592 hp, 441 kW) Argus As 411 engines.
- Fw 189F-2: Fitted with electrically operated landing gear, increased fuel capacity and additional armour plating, powered by two 600 PS (592 hp, 441 kW) Argus As 411 engines.

== Operators ==
Germany

- Luftwaffe

Bulgaria

- Bulgarian Air Force

Hungary

- Royal Hungarian Air Force

Norway

- Royal Norwegian Air Force (postwar)

Romania

- Royal Romanian Air Force

Slovakia

- Slovak Air Force (1939–1945)
- Slovak Insurgent Air Force

== Surviving aircraft ==
Fw 189 V7+1H (Werk Nr. 2100) is the only surviving Fw 189. It was part of 1./Nahaufklärungsgruppe 10, with V7 originally the Geschwaderkennung code for Heeres-Aufklärungsgruppe 32 based at Pontsalenjoki (due east of Kuusamo, and within the south-central area of modern Russia's Republic of Karelia) and took part in its first mission on 4 May 1943. The mission was to photograph the Loukhi-3 airbase from an altitude of 6,000 m (20,000 ft), then to continue north along the Murmansk–Leningrad railway. Approximately 31 minutes after taking off V7+1H was attacked and damaged by Lend-Lease-acquired Soviet Hawker Hurricane fighters. The aircraft dived to escape the fighters, but, owing to the damage suffered, could not pull out in time and it struck the treetops. The tail was torn off and the crew nacelle left hanging upside down within the trees. The pilot, Lothar Mothes, survived but one crewman was killed in the crash and the third died from blood loss as a result of a severed leg. Mothes survived two weeks in sub-zero temperatures, evading Soviet patrols while eating bark and grubs as he walked back to his base. He spent the next nine months in a hospital recovering from severe frostbite before returning to the front line, eventually to fly another 100 missions.

In 1991 the wreckage of V7+1H was found in the Russian forest where it had remained for 48 years. The aircraft was purchased by a group of British aircraft enthusiasts and was shipped to the United Kingdom, arriving at Worthing, West Sussex in March 1992. The Focke Wulf 189 Restoration Society was formed to restore the aircraft to flying condition. Her former pilot, Lothar Mothes, met up again with his aircraft at the 1996 Biggin Hill Airshow.

It was reported that this aircraft was acquired by Paul Allen's Flying Heritage Collection and was in rebuild at Duxford to an airworthy condition, but as of August 1, 2021 was listed for sale.

== Specifications (Fw 189 A-1) ==

Data from Die Deutsche Luftrüstung 1933–1945 Vol.2 – Flugzeugtypen Erla-Heinkel, German Aircraft of the Second World War

General characteristics

- Crew: 3
- Length: 11.9 m (39 ft 1 in)
- Wingspan: 18.4 m (60 ft 4 in)
- Height: 3.1 m (10 ft 2 in)
- Wing area: 38 m^{2} (410 sq ft)
- Empty weight: 2,690 kg (5,930 lb)
- Gross weight: 3,950 kg (8,708 lb)
- Powerplant: 2 × Argus As 410A-1 V-12 inverted air-cooled piston engines 465 PS (459 hp; 342 kW)
- Propellers: 2-bladed Argus variable-pitch propellers

Performance

- Maximum speed: 344 km/h (214 mph, 186 kn) at 2,500 m (8,200 ft)
- Cruise speed: 317 km/h (197 mph, 171 kn)
- Range: 940 km (580 mi, 510 nmi)
- Service ceiling: 7,000 m (23,000 ft)
- Rate of climb: 5 m/s (980 ft/min)
- Time to altitude: 4,000 m (13,000 ft) in eight minutes and 18 seconds
- Landing speed: 120 km/h (75 mph; 65 kn)

Armament

- Guns:

- 2 × 7.92 mm (.312 in) MG 17 machine guns mounted in the wing roots, firing forward
- 1 × 7.92 mm (.312 in) MG 15 machine gun in dorsal flexible mount position firing to rear
- 1 × 7.92 mm (.312 in) MG 15 in rear cone firing to rear (optional)

- Bombs:

- 4 × 50 kg (110 lb) bombs

== See also ==
- Twin-boom aircraft

Aircraft of comparable role, configuration, and era

- Blohm & Voss BV 141
- Fokker G.1
- Sukhoi Su-12

Related lists

- List of military aircraft of Germany
- List of World War II military aircraft of Germany
