= Henschel Hs 129 =

German twin engine WWII ground attack aircraft

Hs 129
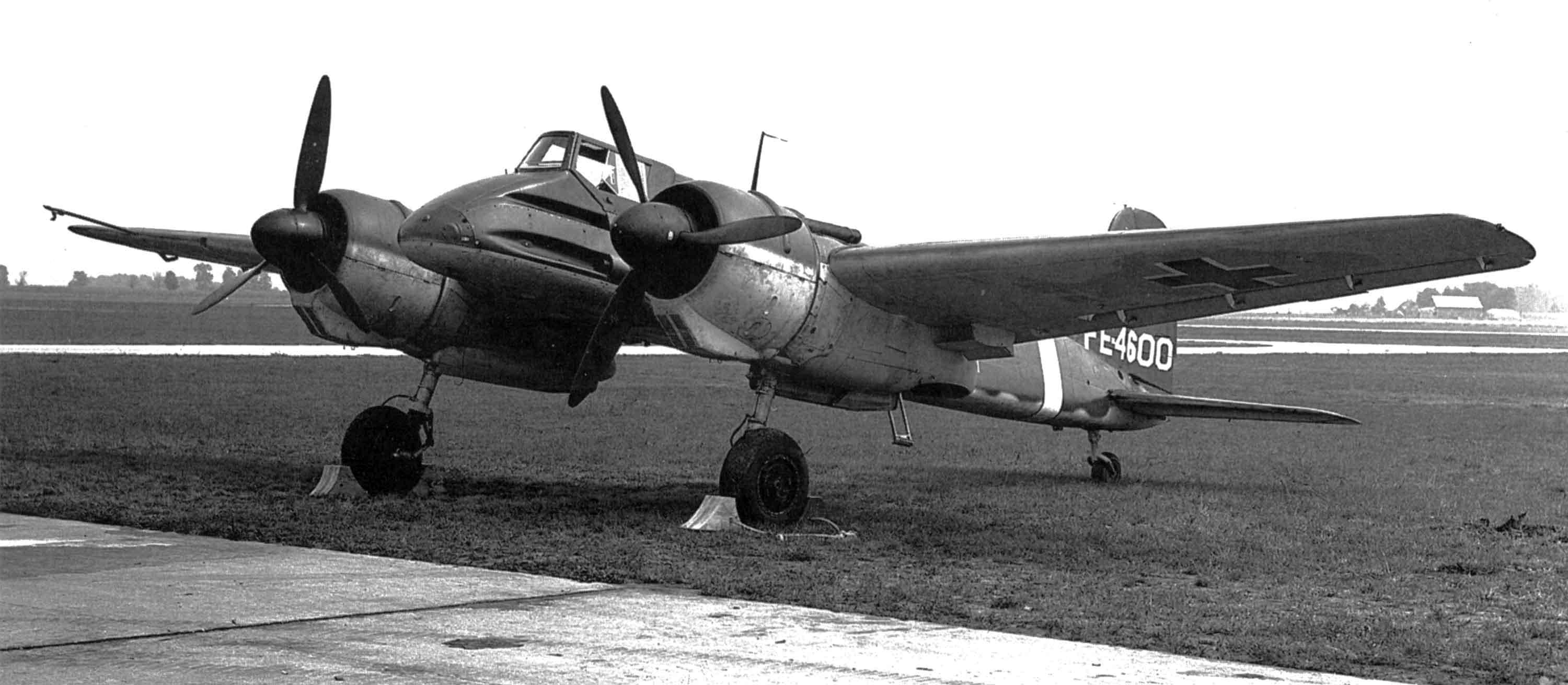
- A captured Henschel Hs 129 B-1 at Freeman Army Airfield, Indiana, 1946

General information
- Type: Attacker
- National origin: Nazi Germany
- Manufacturer: Henschel
- Status: Retired
- Primary users: Luftwaffe: Hungarian Air Force; Romanian Air Force
- Number built: 865

History
- Manufactured: June 1940 – September 1944
- Introduction date: April 1942
- First flight: 29 May 1939
- Retired: 1945

The Henschel Hs 129 was a ground-attack aircraft designed and produced by the German aircraft manufacturer Henschel Flugzeugwerke AG. Fielded by the Luftwaffe during the Second World War, it saw combat in Tunisia and on the Eastern Front.

During the latter half of 1930s, influenced by the experiences of German Condor Legion during the Spanish Civil War, the Reichsluftfahrtministerium (RLM; "Reich Aviation Ministry") sought a new ground-attack aircraft. The specification required protection from ground-based small arms fire, for which Henschel's design (which was initially designated at the P 46) incorporated a steel "bathtub" with angled fuselage sides and a compact canopy that was fitted with tiny windows. A further requirement of the specification was that the aircraft be powered by engines that were not in demand for other types; accordingly, the Hs 129 was designed to be equipped with low-power German Argus As 410 engines, which were only capable of 465 PS (459 hp; 342 kW).

On 29 May 1939, the prototype Hs 129 performed its maiden flight. Early flight testing was largely unsatisfactory, the aircraft proving to be underpowered and overweight while offering poor visibility to the pilot. These problems were addressed with a new canopy with more glazing and the more powerful French Gnome-Rhône 14M engine, which could produce up to 700 PS (690 hp; 515 kW). As such, the Hs 129 A-0 was promptly succeeded by the Hs 129 A-1 and Hs 129 B-1. While Henschel faced competition to fulfil the requirement in the form of the Focke-Wulf Fw 189, the Hs 129 was both smaller and cheaper, and thus continued to hold the RLM's favour. Quantity production of the type was achieved during early 1942.

The Hs 129 was relatively effective when introduced to Luftwaffe service in April 1942. It served on the Eastern Front in a variety of frontline roles. As the conflict progressed, an emphasis on anti-tank support saw the aircraft being continually up-gunned, eventually mounting a 75 mm anti-tank cannon. Only a small number of these Hs 129 B-3 aircraft were produced to see action relatively late in the war. Production of the type peaked in 1943 and finished in September 1944 alongside Nazi Germany's declining military position, although use of the HS 129 continued into the closing months of the conflict.

== Design and development ==
=== Background ===
By the mid-1930s, the German military, as well as its counterparts in other countries, had identified the importance of ground-attack aircraft for the interdiction of logistics and materiel, a task in which targets were often poorly protected and less likely to have strong or well-coordinated defences. For high-value, well-protected tactical targets, the dive bomber was becoming the conventional solution.

The experience of the German Condor Legion during the Spanish Civil War (1936–39) refuted this concept. Even though it was equipped with types unsuited to the role, such as the Henschel Hs 123 and cannon-armed versions of the Heinkel He 112, the Condor Legion proved that ground-attack aircraft were effective in actual combat. This determination led to support within the Luftwaffe for the creation of an aircraft dedicated to this role, and the Reichsluftfahrtministerium (RLM; "Reich Aviation Ministry") through its Technisches Amt (Technical office) formulated a specification for a Schlachtflugzeug (ground-attack aircraft), specifically intended for the direct support of ground forces.

It was anticipated that the main source of damage to such an aircraft would be small arms fire from the ground, meaning that the aircraft ought to be well-armored around key areas, such as its cockpit and engines. Similar protection was also desirable for the canopy, in the form of 75 mm (2.95 in) thick armored glass. The aircraft was expected to be attacking in low-level, head-on strafing runs, so the cockpit had to be located as close as possible to the nose, in order to maximize the visibility of its targets. Another, non-operational, requirement severely hampered the designs: the RLM insisted that the new design be powered by engines that were not being used in existing aircraft, so that the type would not interfere with the production of established types deemed essential to the war effort.

=== Selection and detailed design ===
During April 1937, the newly formulated specification was issued to four companies, Hamburger Flugzeugbau GmbH (later renamed Blohm und Voss), Focke-Wulf Flugzeugbau GmbH, Gothaer Waggonfabrik AG and the Henschel Flugzeug-Werke AG. Of these, Gotha opted to not respond at all while the Hamburger Flugzeugbau offered their P-40 project, a development of their two seat Ha 141, however, the ground attack version was considered to be too unconventional and was eliminated. On 1 October 1937, the RLM issued a pair of development contracts for the two other submissions, which had been determined to superior: one was derived from an existing Focke-Wulf reconnaissance type, the Fw 189, while the other was produced by Henschel. Originally designated the P 46, Henshel's aircraft was later given the official designation of Hs 129 from the RLM in April 1938.

The Hs 129 was designed by Henschel's chief designer, Dipl.-Ing. Friedrich Nicolaus; the detailed design work was completed by mid 1938. The basic configuration was of a compact low-wing monoplane with a triangular-section fuselage. It was designed around a single large "bathtub" of 12mm steel sheeting that made up the floor and 6mm sides of the entire nose area of the aircraft, completely enclosing the pilot up to head level. Even the canopy was steel, with only tiny windows on the side to see out of and two angled blocks of glass for the windscreen. To improve the armor's ability to deflect bullets, the fuselage sides were angled in, forming a triangular shape, resulting in almost no room to move at shoulder level. There was so little room in the cockpit that the instrument panel ended up under the nose below the windscreen, where it was almost invisible; some of the engine instruments were moved outside onto the engine nacelles' inboard-facing surfaces and the gunsight was mounted outside on the nose.

=== Prototypes ===
During 29 May 1939, the first prototype, designated Hs 129 V1, performed its maiden flight. It was promptly joined by two more prototypes, the Hs 129 V2 and Hs 129 V3. These early aircraft participated in competitive evaluations against the Fw 189.

Henschel's aircraft came in 12 percent overweight while the engines produced eight percent less power than had been anticipated; accordingly, it flew poorly. A further complication was the poor external visibility available to the pilot from the cramped cockpit. The controls proved to be almost inoperable as speed increased and in testing, the V2 prototype flew into the ground from a short dive on 5 January 1940 because the stick forces were too high for the pilot to pull out. The Focke-Wulf design proved to be no better. Both aircraft were underpowered as a result of their air-cooled, inverted-V12 Argus As 410 engines as well as being relatively difficult to fly.

Nevertheless, the RLM felt they should continue with the concept. The only real deciding factor between the two designs was that the Henschel was smaller and cheaper, thus a further development contract was issued to Henschel for eight HS 129 A-0 pre-production aircraft while the FW 189 was positioned on low priority as a backup while testing continued with the Hs 129 A-0.

Various improvements were developed by Henschel which resulted in the Hs 129 A-1 series. This model was armed with a pair of 20 mm MG 151/20 cannons and two 7.92 mm (.312 in) MG 17 machine guns, along with the ability to carry four 50 kg (110 lb) bombs along the fuselage centreline. During late 1940, the A-1 was evaluated by Luftwaffe pilots, the notable conclusion of which was that the service refused to accept the aircraft in its current configuration.

=== Hs 129 B-1 ===
Even prior to the delivery of the first A-1s, the aircraft already being redesigned in response to an instruction from the RLM to adopt French Gnome-Rhône 14M radial engines, which were captured in some number when France fell and continued to be produced under German occupation. This engine supplied 700 PS (690 hp; 515 kW) for takeoff, compared with the Argus at 465 PS (459 hp; 342 kW). The Gnome-Rhone radials were also made in versions with opposite rotation for the propeller, and were installed on the Hs 129 with the port engine rotating clockwise and the starboard rotating counterclockwise, as seen from nose-on, thus eliminating engine torque problems.

During early 1941, a pair of HS 129 A-1s were refitted with the Gnome-Rhône radials and quickly demonstrated that they possessed more satisfactory performance. Although reviewing pilots were more satisfied with the aircraft's performance, complaints continued to be filed about the high stick forces as well as the poor visibility from the canopy. Accordingly, new electronically actuated trim tabs and a redesigned canopy with more extensive glazing was installed on the HS 129 B-0, along with a special Revi V12/C sight that was mounted externally just forward of the windscreen. As a result, the aircraft possessed noticeably superior vision. It is believed that all of the A-1s were converted into B-'s (although it has been claimed that some A-1s were sold to Romania).

During December 1941, the first of ten HS 129 B-0s was developed; in March 1942, the production standard Hs 129 B-1 commenced manufacture. Initially, the two models were quite similar, although some difference were apparent in terms of the positioning of the radio apparatus and the presence of exposed blast troughs for the guns on the B-1. Furthermore, the aircraft would receive adaptations to permit the carriage of a wide variety of armaments.

In preparation for the arrival of the B-1, I./SchlG 1 had been formed in January 1942 with Bf 109 E/Bs (fighter-bomber version of Bf 109 E) and Hs 123s and they delivered B-0s and every B-1 that was completed. During April 1942, the first 12 B-1s were delivered, enabling the 4th Staffel (squadron) to achieve operational readiness. They were promptly assigned to the Eastern Front (to Crimea) in the middle of May 1942 and in June they received a new weapon, the 30 mm (1.2 in) MK 101 cannon with armor-piercing ammunition in a centerline pod. This would be the B1/R2 Rüstsätze kit, the B1/R3 had the MK 101 replaced with a ventral tray of four 7.92mm MG 17 machine guns. The B1/R4 had a larger bomb load and the B1/R5 reconnaissance version had a camera.

=== Hs 129 B-2 ===
During May 1942, deliveries of the new Hs 129 B-2 model commenced, side by side with the B-1 (of which just 50 aircraft had been delivered at that point). By July 1943, (prior to the launch of Operation Citadel, these were a total of five units of the Luftwaffe equipped with HS 129s. Initially, the only difference between the B-1 and B-2 models were changes to the fuel system – a host of other minor changes could be found almost at random on either model. These changes accumulated in the B-2 production line until they could eventually be told apart at a glance; the main differences being the removal of the mast for the radio antenna, the addition of a direction-finding radio antenna loop, and shorter exhaust stacks on the engines. In the field, the differences became more pronounced. The Rüstsatz field refit kits were renumbered and some were dropped, and in general, the Hs 129B-2/R2 aircraft in service with 4./Schlachtgeschwader 1 received the upgraded cannon pack using a 30 mm MK 103 cannon instead of the earlier MK 101. The MK 103 was effectively an upgraded MK 101 that was capable of increased muzzle velocity.

By late 1942, reports were coming in about the ineffectiveness of the MK 101 against newer versions of the Soviet T-34 tanks. One obvious solution would be to use the larger 3.7 cm (1.46 in) BK 3,7 (Bordkanone 3,7), recently adapted from the ground-based 3.7 cm Flak 18. These guns had already been converted into underwing pod-mounted weapons for the Junkers Ju 87G and found to be an effective weapon, despite the fact that only 12 shells per pod could be accommodated. When mounted on the Hs 129, the empty area behind the cockpit could be used for ammunition storage, greatly increasing the supply compared to the Ju. The B-2/R3 package introduced the BK 3.7 cm (1.46 in) automatic cannon, but relatively few aircraft were converted in favour of the B-2/R4 and B-3, mounting the BK 7.5.

=== Hs 129 B-3 ===
A closeup of the BK 7,5 Bordkanone 75 mm cannon.

It was decided that the 7.5 cm (2.95 in) semi-automatic Rheinmetall PaK 40 anti-tank gun, which had already been adapted for use in the Junkers Ju 88 P-1, would be further modified for use in the Hs 129. This resulted in the BK 7,5 (Bordkanone 7,5), which, even though it weighed 1,200 kg (2,600 lb), was lighter than the PaK 40. Fully automatic, it featured a new, hydraulic recoil-dampening system and a new, more aerodynamic muzzle brake. An autoloader system, with 12 rounds in a rotary magazine, was fitted in the empty space behind the cockpit, within the rear half of the wing root area. The gun and its recoil mechanism occupied a substantial gun pod under the fuselage, and a circular port at the rear of the pod allowed rearwards ejection of spent cartridges immediately after firing. While this new variant, the Hs 129 B-3, was theoretically capable of destroying any tank in the world, the added weight worsened the aircraft's general performance and it was inferior to previous variants.

The Bordkanone 7,5 was the heaviest and most powerful forward-firing weapon fitted to a production military aircraft during the Second World War. The only other ground-attack aircraft to be factory-equipped with similar-calibre guns were the 1,420 examples of the North American B-25G and B-25H Mitchell, which mounted either a 75 mm (2.95 in) M4 cannon, or lightweight T13E1 or M5 versions of the same gun, both of which required a crew member to manually reload after each shot. The Japanese Mitsubishi Ki-109 Army Heavy Fighter Interceptor also carried a 75mm gun, but only 24 were produced.

In May 1944, a Hs 129B-2, Werknummer 141258, was fitted with a mock-up of the BK 7.5 and underwent aerodynamic testing at Travemünde. The gun fired a 12 kg shell and in an emergency the entire installation could be jettisoned. During August of that year, the first three HS 129 B-3s commenced trials. While deliveries commenced to actual frontline units, around 25 B-3s are believed to have been completed prior to the production line being permanently shut down in September (a small number were reportedly also created by converting B-2 aircraft). In the field, the B-3 proved to be effective even against members of the IS tank family. However, its small numbers meant that it had little effect on the war effort.

=== Hs 129 C ===
To address the poor performance of the aircraft, plans had been under way for some time to fit the aircraft with newer versions of the Italian Isotta-Fraschini Delta air-cooled inverted V12 inline engine that delivered 850 hp (625 kW) and weighed some 510 kg (1,120 lb) apiece, providing more power than the Argus As 411 engine of similar configuration and lighter (385 kg) weight. The engine installation ran into a number of delays and was still not ready for production when Henschel's plant was overrun by the Allies in 1945.

=== Hs 129 D ===
Planned version of the Hs 129. Powered by either two 809 kW (1,085 hp; 1,100 PS) Junkers Jumo 211 or two 1,148 kW (1,539 hp; 1,561 PS) BMW 801 to improve its performance. No prototypes were made.

== Operators ==
Germany

- Luftwaffe

Hungary

- Royal Hungarian Air Force

Romania

- Royal Romanian Air Force

== Specifications (Hs 129 B-2) ==

Data from Henschel Hs 129...der geflügelte Büchsenöffner

General characteristics

- Crew: 1
- Length: 9.75 m (32 ft 0 in)
- Wingspan: 14.2 m (46 ft 7 in)
- Height: 3.25 m (10 ft 8 in)
- Wing area: 29 m^{2} (310 sq ft)
- Empty weight: 4,020 kg (8,863 lb)
- Max takeoff weight: 5,250 kg (11,574 lb)
- Powerplant: 2 × Gnome-Rhône 14M-4/-5 14-cylinder air-cooled radial engine, 515 kW (691 hp)700 PS each for take-off
- Propellers: 3-bladed Ratier constant speed propeller, 2.6 m (8 ft 6 in) diameter

Performance

- Maximum speed: 407 km/h (253 mph, 220 kn) at 3,830 m (12,570 ft)
- Cruise speed: 315 km/h (196 mph, 170 kn) at 3,000 m (9,800 ft)
- Range: 690 km (430 mi, 370 nmi)
- Service ceiling: 9,000 m (30,000 ft)
- Rate of climb: 8.1 m/s (1,590 ft/min)

Armament

- Guns: ** 2 × 7.92 mm (0.323 in) MG 17 machine guns, later models from 1943 to 1944 replaced the MG 17s with 2 × 13 mm (.51 in) MG 131 machine guns
  - 2 × 20 mm MG 151/20 cannon or
  - a 30 mm (1.181 in) MK 101 cannon or MK 103 cannon in a conformally mounted gun pod (B-2/R-2).
- Bombs: ** 2 × 50 kg (110 lb) bombs on underwing hardpoints
  - 4 × 50 kg (110 lb) fragmentation bombs on belly racks

== See also ==
Aircraft of comparable role, configuration, and era

- IMAM Ro.57
- Ilyushin Il-2
- Junkers Ju 87D/G

Related lists

- List of aircraft of World War II
- List of military aircraft of Germany
