= Arado Ar 198 =

Prototype reconnaissance aircraft by Arado

Ar 198
- Arado Ar 198 D-ODLG. (First prototype)

General information
- Type: Short range reconnaissance
- National origin: Germany
- Manufacturer: Arado Flugzeugwerke
- Primary user: Luftwaffe
- Number built: 1

History
- First flight: March 1938

The Arado Ar 198 was a prototype reconnaissance aircraft, developed by Arado Flugzeugwerke, with backing from the Luftwaffe, who initially preferred it over the Blohm & Voss BV 141 and the Focke-Wulf Fw 189. However, when flight tests were carried out the aircraft performed poorly and did not impress the Luftwaffe. One aircraft was completed in 1938.

== Design and development ==
In 1936, the RLM issued a specification for a new aircraft that would specialize in short-range reconnaissance, with special emphasis placed on ground vision. Arado, Blohm & Voss (Hamburger Flugzeugbau Division), Focke- Wulf, and Henschel all had experience with this specific type of aircraft and started work immediately.

The Ar 198 was to be built around a three-man crew, consisting of a pilot, gunner/radio operator, and observer. Both the pilot and gunner/radio operator positions were above the wing, while the observer's area was below the wing, in a well-laid-out fuselage that offered good communication between the crew members.

Built using a shoulder wing configuration, giving the pilot unrestricted forward visibility, the Ar 198 was of steel tube construction for the forward fuselage structure with all-metal monocoque construction of the tail boom.

An air-cooled radial BMW 132 engine was initially chosen, but due to availability concerns, the first prototype was fitted with the slightly lower-powered Bramo 323 A-1 of the Brandenburgische Motorenwerke.

== Operational history ==
In early March 1938, the Ar 198 made its first flight from the factory airfield at Warnemünde. Following flights proved generally satisfactory, except for instability in all axes during low-speed flight. Automatic slats were fitted with noticeable improvement, but It was still a difficult craft to handle.

Basic poor performance and concerns about insufficient production capacity led the Technical Office to terminate the development of the Arado Ar 198 in the latter months of 1938.

Image showing excellent view of the ground from the observer position.

== Specifications ==
Data from Warplanes of the Third Reich

General characteristics

- Crew: three
- Length: 11.80 m (38 ft 9 in)
- Wingspan: 14.90 m (48 ft 11 in)
- Height: 4.51 m (14 ft 10 in)
- Wing area: 35.20 m^{2} (378.9 sq ft)
- Empty weight: 2,400 kg (5,290 lb)
- Gross weight: 3,031 kg (6,683 lb)
- Powerplant: 1 × BMW-Bramo 323A nine-cylinder air-cooled radial engine, 670 kW (900 hp)

Performance

- Maximum speed: 359 km/h (223 mph, 194 kn) at 3,500 m (11,485 ft)
- Range: 1,081 km (672 mi, 584 nmi)
- Service ceiling: 8,000 m (26,250 ft)

Armament

- Guns: 1× fixed forward firing 7.92 mm MG 17 machine gun and 2× MG 15 machine guns flexibly mounted at dorsal and ventral positions
- Bombs: 4 × 50 kg (110 lb) SC50 bombs on underwing racks
