= Blohm & Voss BV 141 =

German reconnaissance aircraft prototype

BV 141
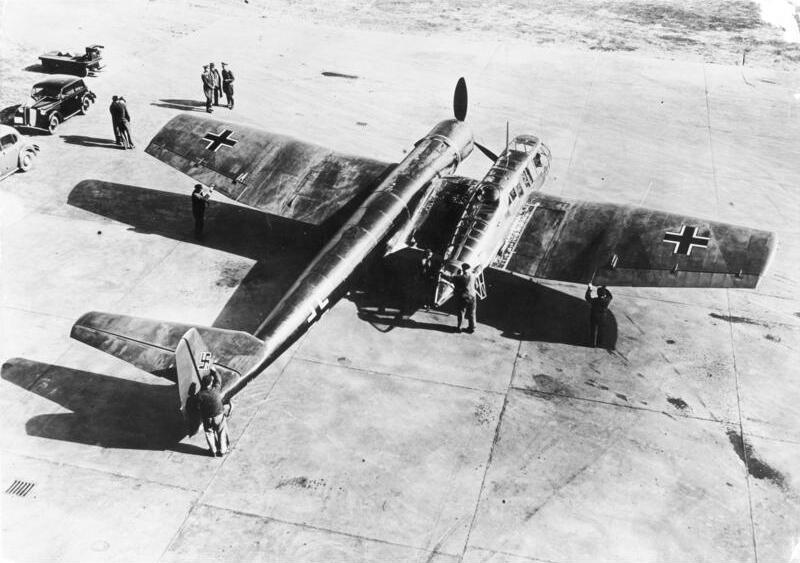
- BV 141B featuring its asymmetrical gondola and tailplane

General information
- Type: Reconnaissance, light bomber
- Manufacturer: Blohm & Voss
- Designer: Richard Vogt
- Primary user: Luftwaffe
- Number built: ~28

History
- First flight: 25 February 1938

The Blohm & Voss BV 141 (originally the Ha 141) was an unorthodox tactical reconnaissance aircraft developed by the German aircraft manufacturer Blohm & Voss. It was notable for its uncommon structural asymmetry.

Development commenced during 1937 in response to a Reichsluftfahrtministerium (RLM/German Aviation Ministry) specification seeking a new single-engine reconnaissance aircraft. While not invited to participate, the firm's design team opted to use a radical configuration for the BV 141 that placed the crew inside of a Plexiglas-glazed gondola that was positioned starboard of the engine and tail boom. Although the RLM declined to finance its development in favour of other options, Blohm & Voss chose to spend its own money to produce a prototype, which performed its maiden flight on 25 February 1938.

During flight testing, the aircraft proved itself to possess relatively good performance. Despite this, the RLM cancelled production plans for the BV 141A in April 1940 due to its perceived lack of power. A more powerful version of the aircraft, the BV 141B, commenced testing in 1941. However, development was protracted and a planned operational deployment on the Eastern Front was cancelled in 1942. The aircraft was never ordered into full-scale production for multiple reasons; these included the unavailability of the preferred engine and strong competition from another tactical reconnaissance aircraft, the twin-engined Focke-Wulf Fw 189 Uhu. Several examples were captured and studied by the Allied powers.

== Development ==
=== Background ===
During the mid-to-late 1930s, efforts were underway to develop and construct suitable aircraft to equip the rapidly growing Luftwaffe. To this end, during 1937, the Reichsluftfahrtministerium (RLM/German Aviation Ministry) issued a specification that called for a single-engine reconnaissance aircraft that would succeed the Henschel Hs 126. Stipulations included the use of a single engine (this was intended to reduce maintenance requirements in the field), accommodation of a three-man crew, and the possession of favourable all-round visual characteristics superior to that typically offered by parasol wing aircraft such as the Hs 126. Several different German aircraft companies opted to respond to this specification, including Arado, Focke-Wulf, and Blohm & Voss.

At one stage, the preferred contractor to fulfil the requirement was Arado, which had submitted the Ar 198. A single-engined shoulder-wing monoplane, the Ar 198 featured an enlarged glazed central fuselage position to facilitate good external visibility. However, the Ar 198 prototype proved to be unsatisfactory during flight testing. The competing Fw 189 Uhu featured a twin-boom configuration and was powered by a pair of smaller engines in spite of the requirement having stipulated the use of a single-engine.

Blohm & Voss (Hamburger Flugzeugbau), although not invited to participate, opted to pursue the requirement as a private venture. The company's design team, headed by chief designer Dr. Richard Vogt, produced a somewhat radical proposal in the form of the uniquely asymmetric BV 141. In terms of its general configuration, the aircraft's single engine was directly attached to the forward end of the tail boom while the crew were seated with a Plexiglas-glazed gondola; the tailboom and gondola were connected via the wing.

Although Ernst Udet of the Technical Department of the RLM was interested in the BV 141, several other key figures within the RLM did not look favourably upon Blohm & Voss's submission, and ultimately the RLM declined to fund its development. Not dissuaded by this unenthusiastic reception, the company elected to self-finance the construction of a single prototype, initially designated as the Ha 141-0.

=== Into flight ===
On 25 February 1938, the Ha 141-0 performed its maiden flight; it was quickly determined to possess relatively few problems. Soon thereafter, it was accepted as the first of three development prototypes, at which point it was redesignated BV 141 V2. The second prototype to fly, BV 141 V1, joined the test programme in September 1938; it was somewhat larger than the earlier aircraft and was the first to be equipped with the highly-panelled crew gondola. BV 141 V3 was intended to be more representative of the prospective production aircraft, featuring increased dimensions, a widened undercarriage, and various armaments, including a pair of forward-firing 7.92mm MG 17 machine guns and a pair of aft-facing 7.92mm MG 15 machine guns along with up to four SC50 bombs on bomb racks and automatic camera apparatus.

Encouraged by the favourable performance of BV 141 V3, the RLM placed an order for a further five preproduction aircraft, the first of which started flying during early 1939. During January 1940, this version of the aircraft, designated BV 141A, underwent an official evaluation at E-Stelle Rechlin that concluded favourably. However, on 4 April 1940, the RLM decided that the aircraft was underpowered, although it was also noted that it had otherwise exceeded the requirements, leading to production plans being cancelled.

Even prior to the RLM's cancellation, Blohm & Voss was working on an extensive redesign of the aircraft, designated BV 141B. It was powered by the BMW 801 radial engine, but also featured numerous structural changes, a further enlargement, a revised outer wing panel arrangement, and a new asymmetric tailplane. An initial order for five BV 141Bs was received, the first of which flew on 9 January 1941. This aircraft demonstrated aerodynamic issues, necessitating several modifications, including structural strengthening. Progress was relatively slow while teething issues were addressed, which delayed the delivery of BV 141 V13 for the type's official evaluation until 15 May 1943.

By the time a batch of 12 BV 141Bs were built with the BMW 801 engine, they were too late to make an impression, as the RLM had already decided to put the Fw 189 into production. Furthermore, an urgent need for BMW 801 engines to power the Fw 190 fighter aircraft reduced the chance of the BV 141B being produced in quantity. At no point was the BV141 ever considered to be an operational type, though the B-02 (V-10) was evaluated in Autumn 1941 by Aufklärungsschule 1 (Reconnaissance school). At one point it was planned to send a handful of aircraft to the Eastern Front, however these plans were cancelled in 1942.

Vogt came up with several other asymmetric designs, including the piston-jet P.194.01, but none of those were actually built. Several wrecked BV 141s were found by advancing Allied forces. One aircraft was captured by British forces and sent to England for examination. No examples survive today.

== Design ==
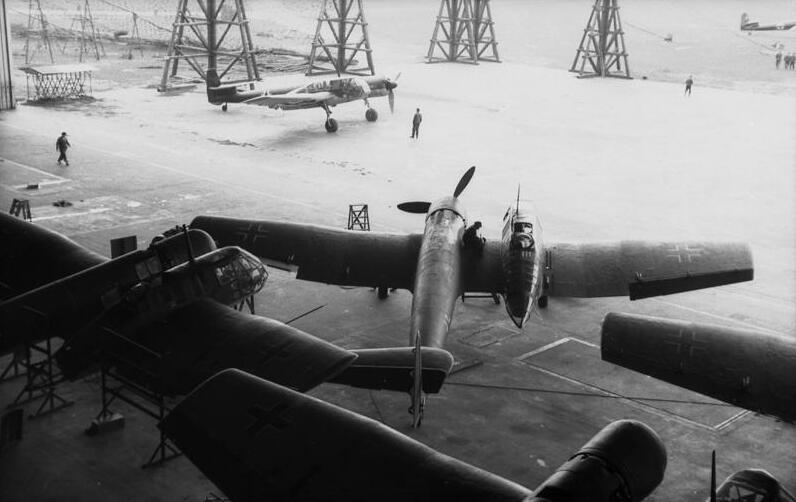
Assembly of BV 141B

All three crew (pilot, observer and rear gunner) of the BV 141 was seated within a gondola, which was extensively glazed with Plexiglas. This gondola was positioned on the starboard side of the engine and strongly resembled that found on the Fw 189. The fuselage was located on the port side and led smoothly from the BMW 132N (Note: The first prototypes used 1,000 PS (986 hp, 736 kW) Bramo 323 radial engine.) radial engine to a tail unit. At first glance, the placement of weight would have induced tendency to roll, but the weight was evenly supported by lift from the wings.

In terms of thrust vs drag asymmetry, the countering of induced yaw was a more complicated matter. At low airspeed, it was calculated to be mostly alleviated because of a phenomenon known as P-factor, while at normal airspeed it proved to be easily controlled with trimming. The tailplane was symmetrical at first, but in the 141B it became asymmetrical – starboard tailplane virtually removed – to improve the rear gunner's fields of view and fire. The displaced center of gravity was accounted for through a combination of propeller torque and the specific arrangement of the outer wing areas,

== Variants ==
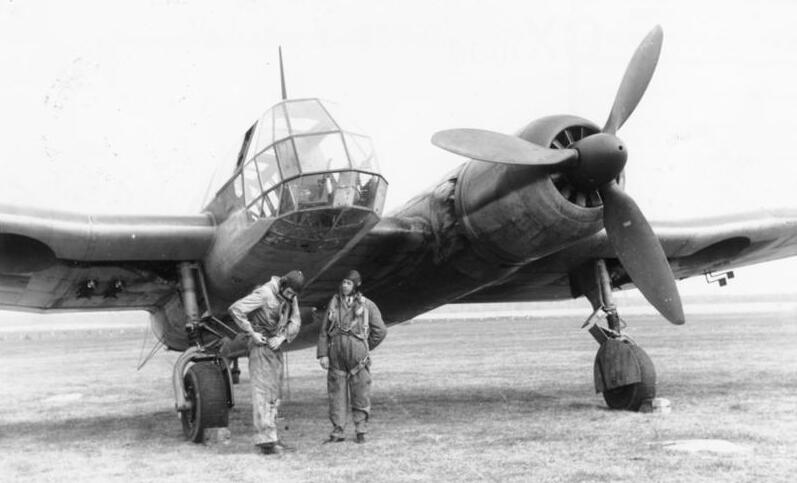
BV 141B

All 20 of the BV 141Bs that were ordered were produced and delivered. There exists a complete record of BV 141 production with either a German civil registration number or pre-military, four letter Stammkennzeichen factory radio code number.

=== Prototypes ===
Ha 141-0
D-ORJE; original designation of the first aircraft completed with the stepped cockpit nacelle. Became the BV 141 V2.
BV 141 V1
WNr 141-00-0171; D-OTTO then BL+AU, damaged
BV 141 V2
WNr 141-00-0172; D-ORJE then PC+BA; chronologically, the first one built and the only one known under old "Ha" designation as "Ha 141"
BV 141 V3
WNr 141-00-0359; D-OLGA then BL+AA

=== Pre-series BV 141A-0 ===
BV 141A-01
(V4); WNr 01010360; D-OLLE; damaged

BV 141A-02
(V5); WNr 01010361; BL+AB

BV 141A-03
(V6); WNr 01010362; BL+AC

BV 141A-04
(V7); WNr 01010363; BL+AD

BV 141A-05
(V8); WNr 01010364; BL+AE

=== Pre-series BV 141B-0 ===
The first to have BMW 801 engine. About 2 m longer and 2 m wider than A-05.

- B-01 (V9) - WNr 0210001; NC+QZ; first flown 9 January 1941, had severe structural problem
- B-02 (V10) - WNr 0210002; NC+RA; first flown 1 June 1941
- B-03 (V11) - WNr 0210003; NC+RB
- B-04 (V12) - WNr 0210004; NC+RC
- B-05 (V13) - WNr 0210005; NC+RD
- B-06 (V14) - WNr 0210006; NC+RE
- B-07 (V15) - WNr 0210007; NC+RF
- B-08 (V16) - WNr 0210008; NC+RG
- B-09 (V17) - WNr 0210009; NC+RH
- B-10 (V18) - WNr 0210010; NC+RI

=== Series BV 141B-1 ===
- WNr 0210011; GK+GA
- WNr 0210012; GK+GB
- WNr 0210013; GK+GC
- WNr 0210014; GK+GD
- WNr 0210015; GK+GE
- WNr 0210016; GK+GF
- WNr 0210017; GK+GG
- WNr 0210018; GK+GH
- WNr 0210019; GL+AG; rebuilt D-OTTO
- WNr 0210020; GL+AH; rebuilt D-OLLE

== Specifications (BV 141B-02 [V10]) ==
BV 141B

Data from

General characteristics

- Crew: 3
- Length: 13.95 m (45 ft 9 in)
- Wingspan: 17.45 m (57 ft 3 in)
- Height: 3.6 m (11 ft 10 in)
- Wing area: 52.9 m^{2} (569 sq ft)
- Empty weight: 4,700 kg (10,362 lb)
- Gross weight: 5,700 kg (12,566 lb)
- Max takeoff weight: 6,100 kg (13,448 lb)
- Powerplant: 1 × BMW 801A 14-cylinder air-cooled radial piston engine, 1,147 kW (1,538 hp) for take-off at sea level

Performance

- Maximum speed: 368 km/h (229 mph, 199 kn) at sea level; 438 km/h (272 mph) at 5,000 m (16,404 ft)
- Range: 1,900 km (1,200 mi, 1,000 nmi) maximum
- Service ceiling: 10,000 m (33,000 ft)
- Wing loading: 107.75 kg/m^{2} (22.07 lb/sq ft)
- Power/mass: 0.204 kW/kg (0.124 hp/lb)

Armament

- Guns: 2 × 7.92mm MG 17 machine guns (fixed forward), 2 × 7.92mm MG 15 machine guns (rear-mounted flexible)
- Bombs: 4 × SC50 bombs

== See also ==
Aircraft of comparable role, configuration, and era

- Focke-Wulf Fw 189 Uhu
- Blohm & Voss BV 237

Related lists

- List of military aircraft of Germany
