= MK 115 cannon =

MK 115
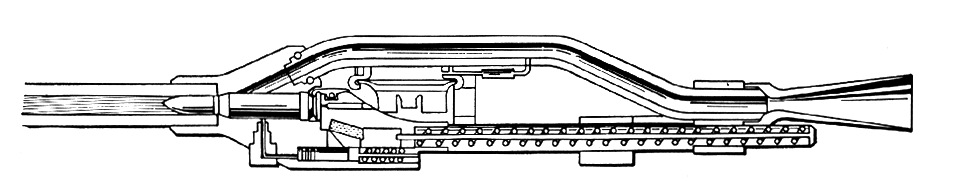

Production history
- Designer: Rheinmetall-Borsig
- No. built: 1 (prototype)

Specifications
- Mass: 180 kilograms (400 lb)
- Length: 3,300 millimetres (130 in)
- Barrel length: 1,320 millimetres (52 in)
- Cartridge: 55x318R
- Caliber: 55 mm
- Rate of fire: 300 rounds/min
- Muzzle velocity: 600 m/s (2,000 ft/s)
- Feed system: 100 rounds

The MK 115 (German: Maschinenkanone 115—"machine cannon 115") was an autocannon developed in Germany in late World War II by Rheinmetall-Borsig for use in aircraft. It was an unusual development in that although it employed a locked breech, it also used a funnel to allow some of the propellant gases to escape out the rear in order to reduce recoil when firing, essentially being an automatic recoilless rifle. The MK 115 was chambered for a 5.5 cm round (in common with a few other late-war German designs), but used a partially combustible cartridge, leaving only the base of the cartridge to eject. The MK 115 was a gas-operated, belt-fed weapon, and its breechblock used a swinging lock mechanism. It had a rifled barrel with an 8°30′ twist. A single prototype in the late stages of development was captured by the Western allies.

== See also ==
- MK 112 cannon
