= MK 101 cannon =

WWII-era German 30mm aircraft autocannon

MK 101
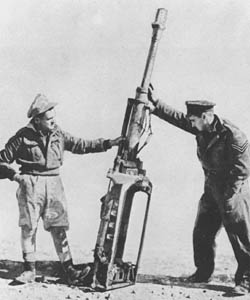
- The MK 101 machine cannon
- Type: Aircraft autocannon
- Place of origin: Germany

Service history
- In service: 1941–1945
- Used by: Nazi Germany
- Wars: World War II

Production history
- Designer: Rheinmetall-Borsig
- Designed: 1940
- Manufacturer: Rheinmetall-Borsig
- Produced: 1940–1945

Specifications
- Mass: 139 kg (306 lb)
- Length: 2,592 mm (102.0 in)
- Barrel length: 1,350 mm (53 in)
- Cartridge: 30x184B, steel casing
- Action: Recoil operation
- Rate of fire: 230–260 rounds/min
- Muzzle velocity: 900 m/s (2,953 ft/s)

The MK 101 is the designation of a 30 mm autocannon used in German combat aircraft during World War II. Although accurate and powerful, with a high muzzle velocity, it was very heavy, with a low rate of fire, which limited its production.

== Development and use ==
Developed in 1935 by Rheinmetall-Borsig as a commercial venture as the MG-101 (later designated MK 101, with the "MK" abbreviating the term Maschinenkanone, as an autocannon), the MK 101 cannon was a 30 mm (1.18 in), long-barreled automatic cannon capable of firing nine different types of 30x184B mm ammunition (ranging from basic high explosive to tungsten-cored armor-piercing rounds). Featuring pneumatic cocking and fired by percussion via an electrical solenoid, the MK 101 was recoil-operated. In operation, the barrel and bolt recoiled 30 mm (1.18 in) to the rear after each shot. The bolt locked via a Stange-type machined sleeve with internal interrupted threads, similar to some Solothurn weapons such as the 7.92 mm (.312 in) MG 30 light machine gun. The locking system was strong, but rate of fire was limited to a rather slow 230–260 rpm, which limited its use against other aircraft. Powerful and accurate for its day, it was carried primarily on the Henschel Hs 129 ground-attack aircraft, commencing in late 1941. Fed by a 10-round (early versions) or a 30-round box magazine, the MK 101 could penetrate 75 mm (3 in) of armor at 300 m (330 yd) range. The dozen examples created of the Heinkel He 177A-1/U2 Zerstörer ("Destroyer") experimental prototype attack aircraft used twinned MK 101s on a forward-aimed limited-traverse mount, located in the extreme lower nose at the front of a dramatically enlarged Bola inverted-casemate gondola emplacement under the nose, and was intended for anti-ship and possible "train-busting" use, but was never deployed in combat. When it was used from beneath an Hs 129's central fuselage as a ventral gun pod-mounted anti-tank weapon, the MK 101's tungsten-cored AP round was capable of penetrating the turret and side armor of the Soviet KV-1 heavy tank. An electrically-fired version of the MK 101 cannon was later developed and designated the MK 103.

== See also ==
- MK 103 cannon
- MK 108 cannon
