= MK 103 cannon =

WWII-era German 30mm aircraft autocannon

MK 103
- Type: single-barrel automatic cannon
- Place of origin: Germany

Service history
- In service: 1943–1945
- Used by: German Armed Forces (airborne and land based)
- Wars: World War II

Production history
- Manufacturer: Rheinmetall-Borsig

Specifications
- Mass: 141 kg (311 lb)
- Length: 2,335 mm (91.9 in)
- Barrel length: 1,338 mm (52.7 in)
- Cartridge: 30x184B
- Cartridge weight: 800 g (28 oz)) HE/M
- Caliber: 30 mm (1.181 in)
- Action: Gas/Recoil.
- Rate of fire: 380 (HE/M) to 420 (APCR) rounds/min
- Muzzle velocity: 860 m/s (2,800 ft/s) HE/M; 940 m/s (3,100 ft/s) APCR

The Rheinmetall-Borsig MK 103 ("MK" - Maschinenkanone) was a German 30 mm caliber autocannon that was mounted in German combat aircraft during World War II. Intended to be a dual purpose weapon for anti-tank and air-to-air fighting, it was developed from the MK 101. Compared to the MK 101 it was faster firing, and was originally intended to develop a higher muzzle velocity than the MK 101. Unlike the MK 101, the MK 103 used a belt feed, allowing it to potentially carry a larger ammunition load. The MK 103 used electrically primed rather than percussion-primed ammunition. The operating mechanism differed from the recoil-operated MK 101 in that it used a combination of gas and recoil operation. After firing, gas pressure served to unlock the breech, while barrel recoil was used to cycle the action (eject spent cartridge and load a fresh one).

Because of a combination of lower grade steels and lighter components, the mechanism of the MK 103 was not as strong as the MK 101. To counteract this weakness, HE ammunition with a reduced load of propellant was used, resulting in a loss of about 100 m/s in muzzle velocity compared to the MK 101, but the rate of fire was increased. The MK 103 entered service in 1943 as the main armament of the Hs 129 B-1 ground-attack/tank-destroyer aircraft, mounted on the underside of the fuselage in a conformal gun pod.

The original specification for the MK 103 called for it to fit inside an aircraft's engine mounting as an engine gun (German: motorkanone), firing through a hollow propeller hub, but it proved to be too large and heavy to fit into small fighters like the Bf 109. If mounted elsewhere, such as in the wing, the asymmetric force of the cannon's recoil tended to yaw the aircraft's nose to one side. The only known usages of the MK 103 in a Motorkanone installation were in the Do 335 and the Ta 152 C3 (possibly also the BV 155, Bf 109K-14). A modified version with a reduced-profile barrel, the MK 103M, was developed and possibly tested for use as a Motorkanone cannon on single-engine fighter planes such as the Bf 109K, but probably never saw active service. As a consequence, the MK 103 was largely restricted to the role of an air-to-ground weapon for use against armoured vehicles.

Projectile weights for the MK 103 were 330 g (12 oz)) for the HE/M ammunition and 355 g (12.5 oz)) for APCR ammunition. Armour penetration for APCR 42–52 mm (1.7–2.0 in) / 60° / 300 m (980 ft) or 75–95 mm (3.0–3.7 in) / 90° / 300 m (980 ft).

Later in the war the MK 103 was also used as a ground-based anti-aircraft (AA) weapon, using single or dual mounts. It was also used as a flak autocannon in the Flakpanzer IV "Kugelblitz".

Developed alongside the MK 103 was the lighter MK 108 cannon, which had a shorter barrel and used a modified blow-back operating system. It fired the same projectile, using a smaller cartridge case with less propellant, at a reduced muzzle velocity. The shorter barrel made it more adaptable, so it saw much greater use.
