= Stepless cockpit =

Aircraft design feature in which the cockpit shares its contour with the nose

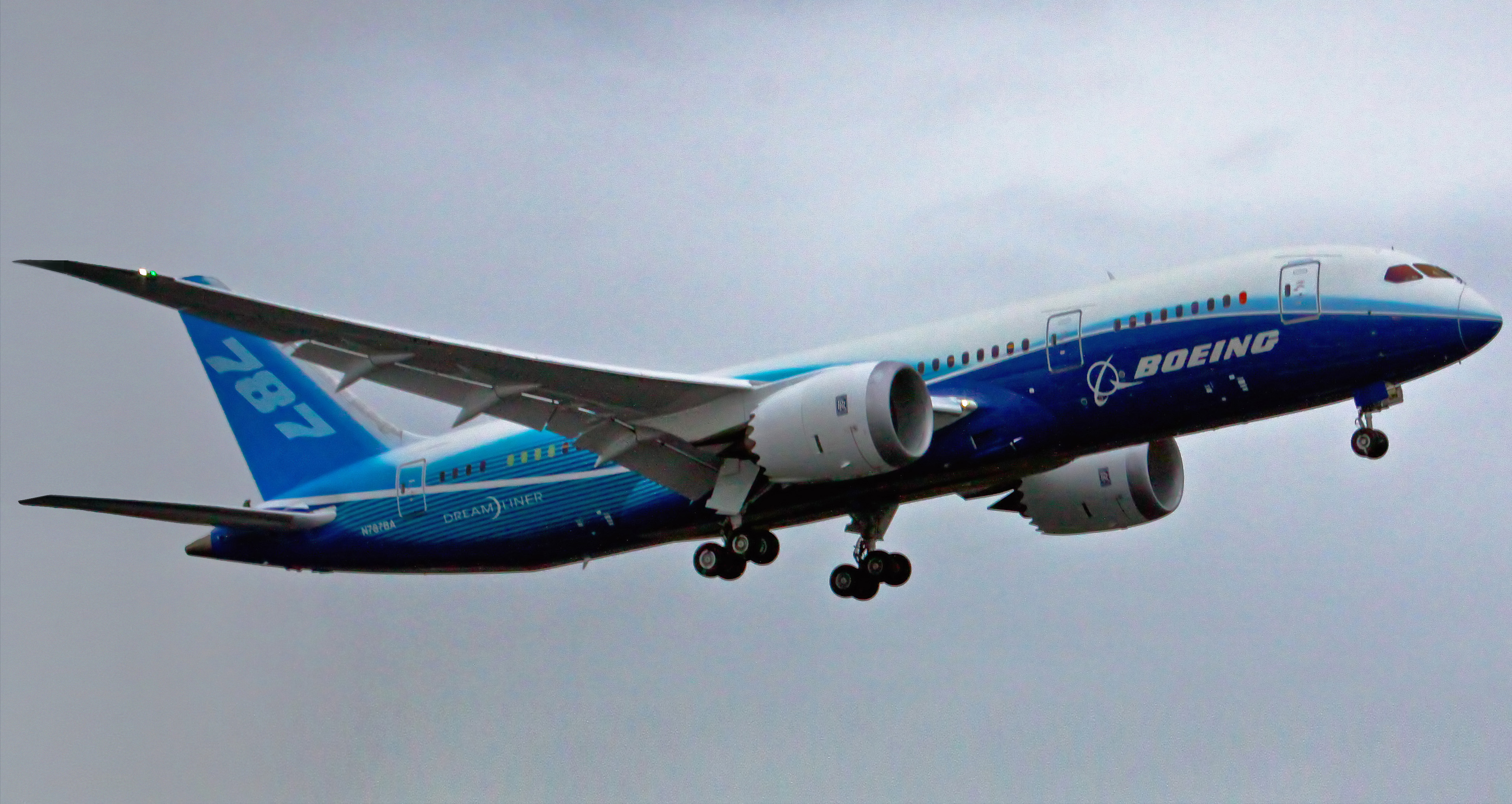
The stepless cockpit has seen a resurgence in newer aircraft, such as the Boeing 787.

In aircraft design, a stepless cockpit means that the nose of the aircraft has no separate "windscreen" panels directly in front of the pilot's or co-pilot's seating positions, and generally has no "breaks" in the nose contour – curved or otherwise – from their absence. In the conventional design, the pilot's cabin is a different part of the aircraft than the nose. The stepless design is believed to help make the plane more aerodynamic thus aiding speed and fuel efficiency. The stepless design did, however, present serious challenges to the inclusion of a nose-mount turreted gun position, in eras where manned or remotely-aimed gun turrets were still important for a bomber's defensive needs.

== Gallery ==
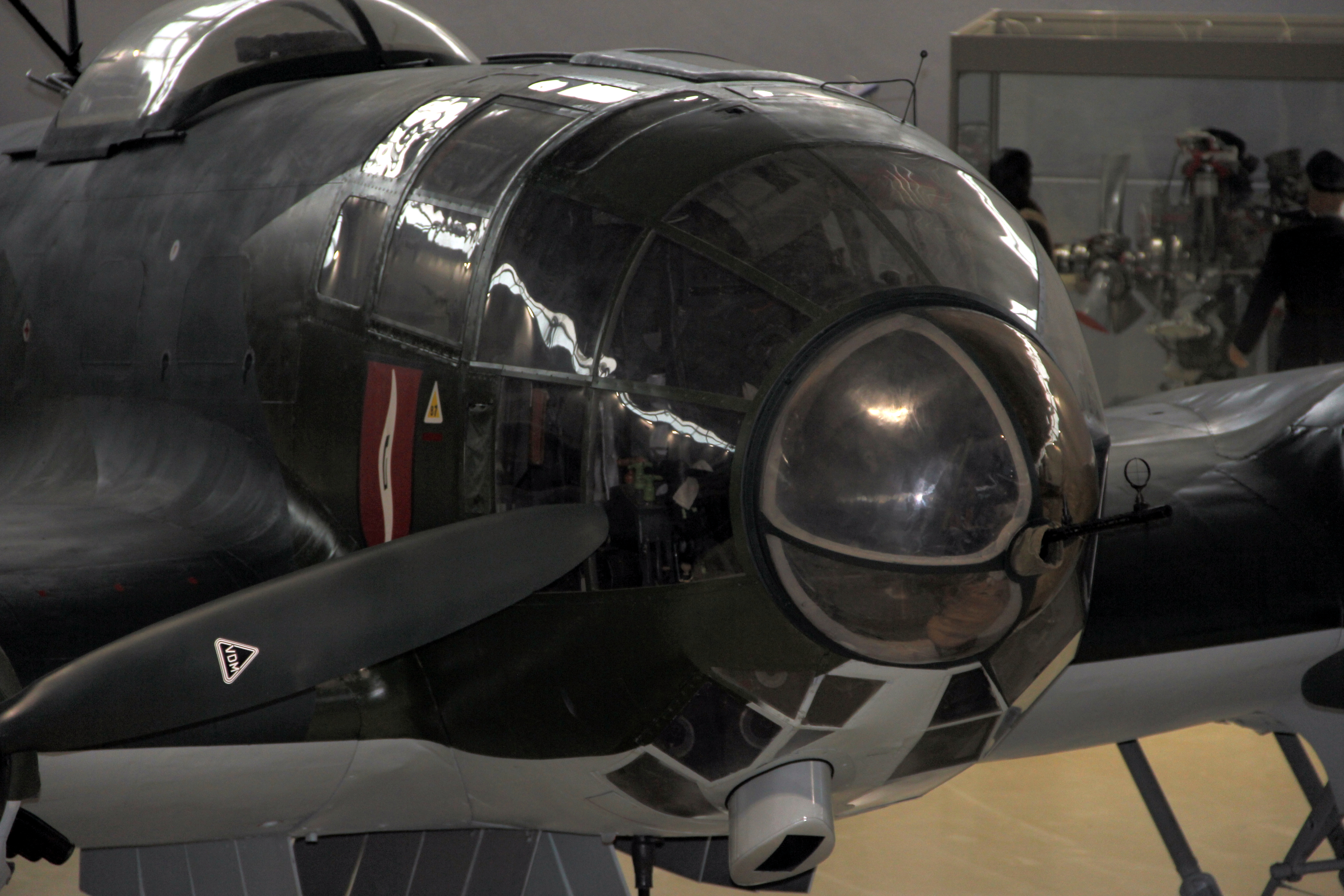
The preserved He 111P in Norway, which pioneered German stepless cockpits in January 1938.

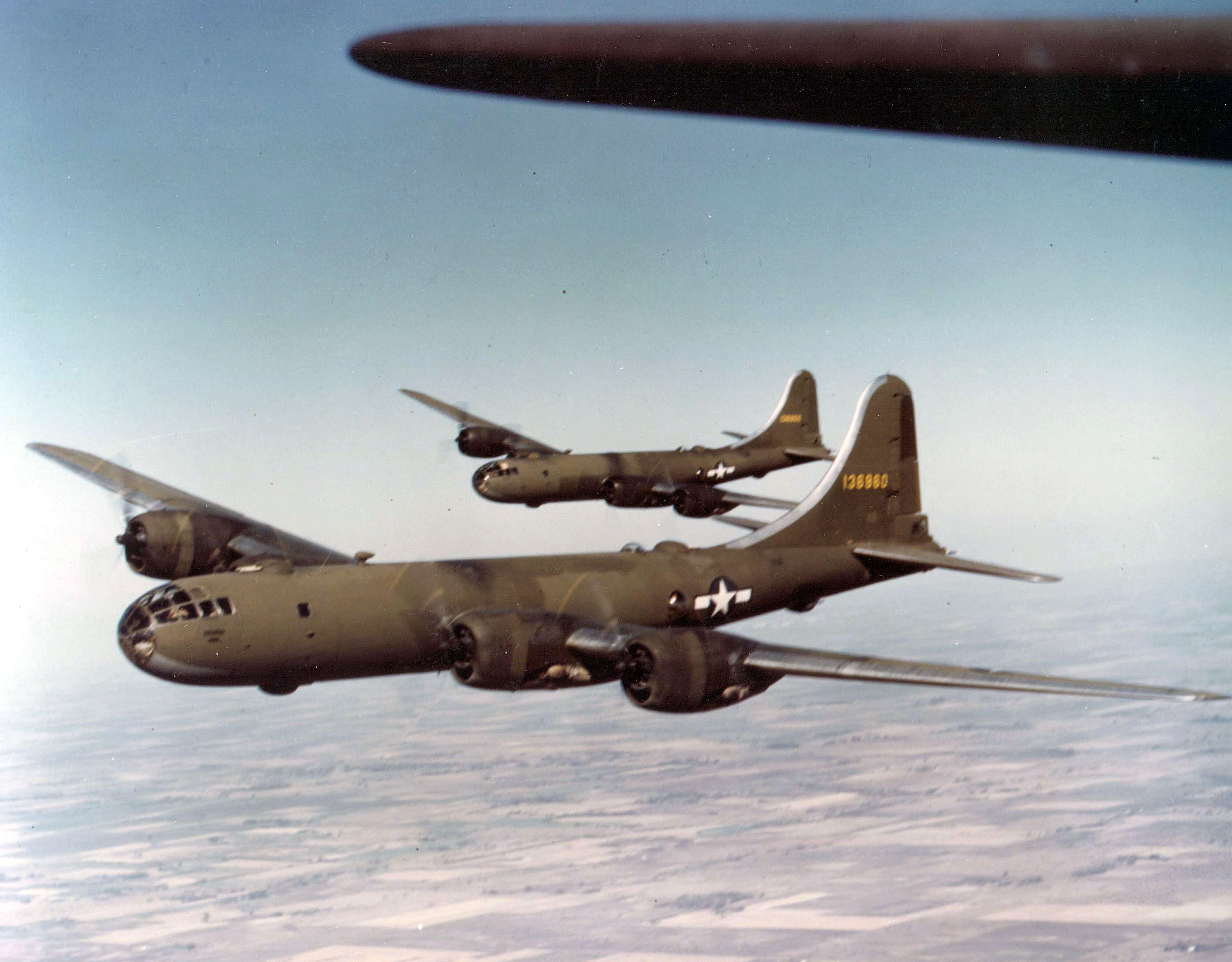
B-29 Superfortress. Note the round, stepless nose.

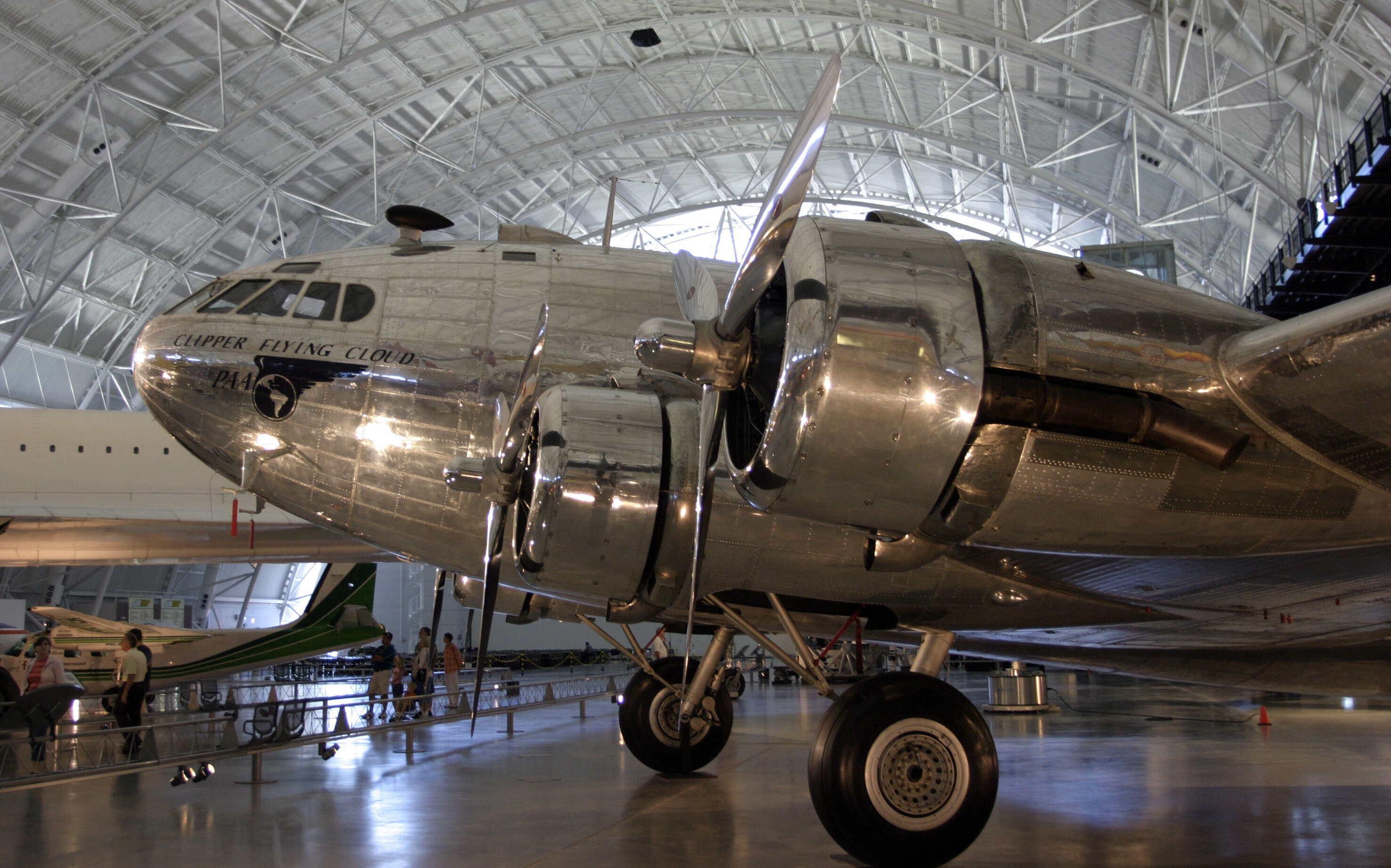
The Boeing 307 Stratoliner airliner is a rare example of a "stepless-cockpit" civilian airliner from the 1940s.

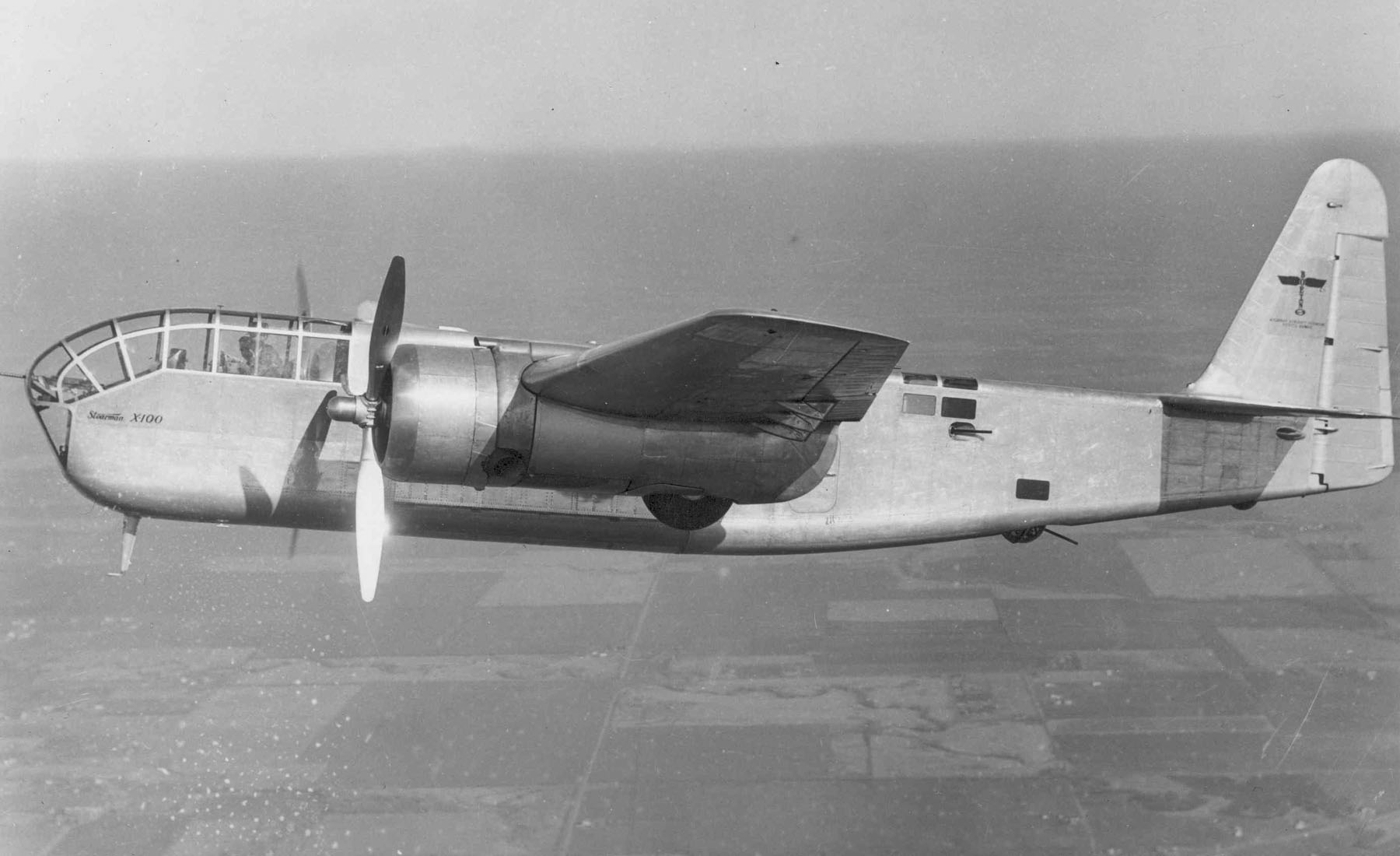
The Stearman XA-21 American medium bomber prototype featured a stepless cockpit as originally designed.

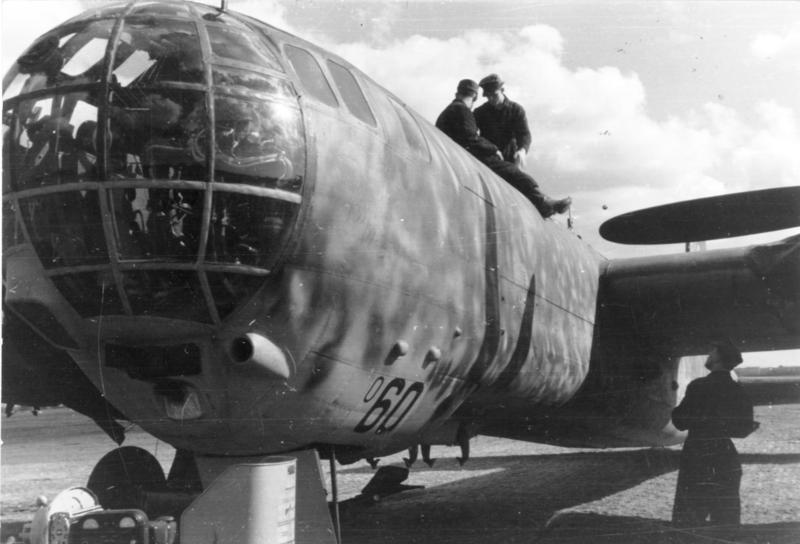
The "Cabin 3" stepless cockpit of a Heinkel He 177A, with "fishbowl" nose glazing

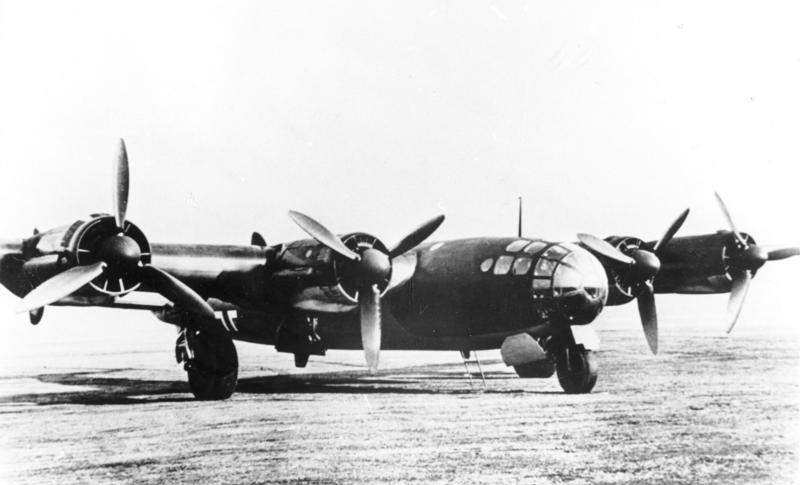
The Messerschmitt Me 264 V1 first prototype, with stepless nose glazing almost visually replicating the Superfortress' own

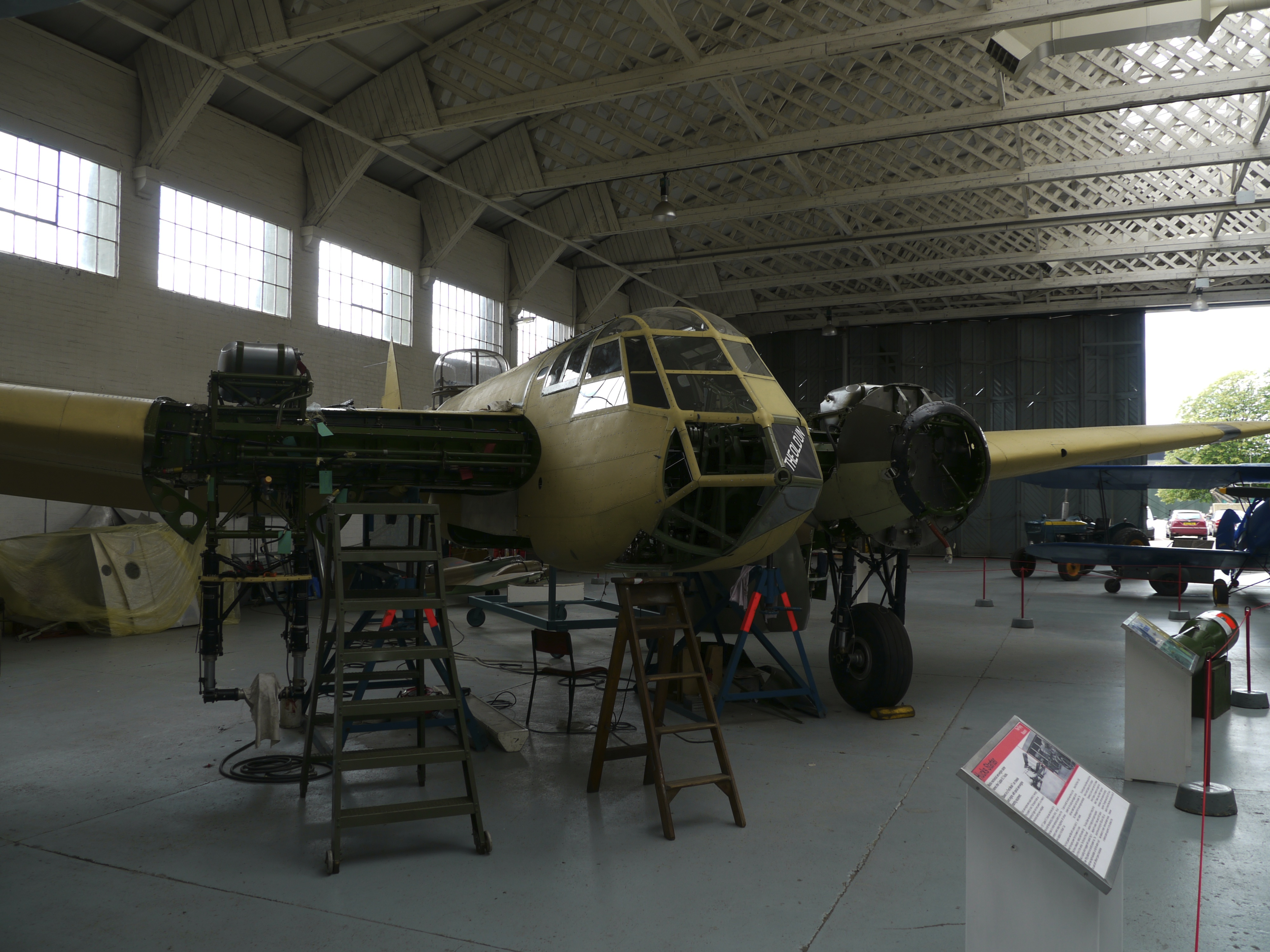
Preserved Bristol Blenheim Mk.I, with stepless cockpit from its forward upper nose contour.

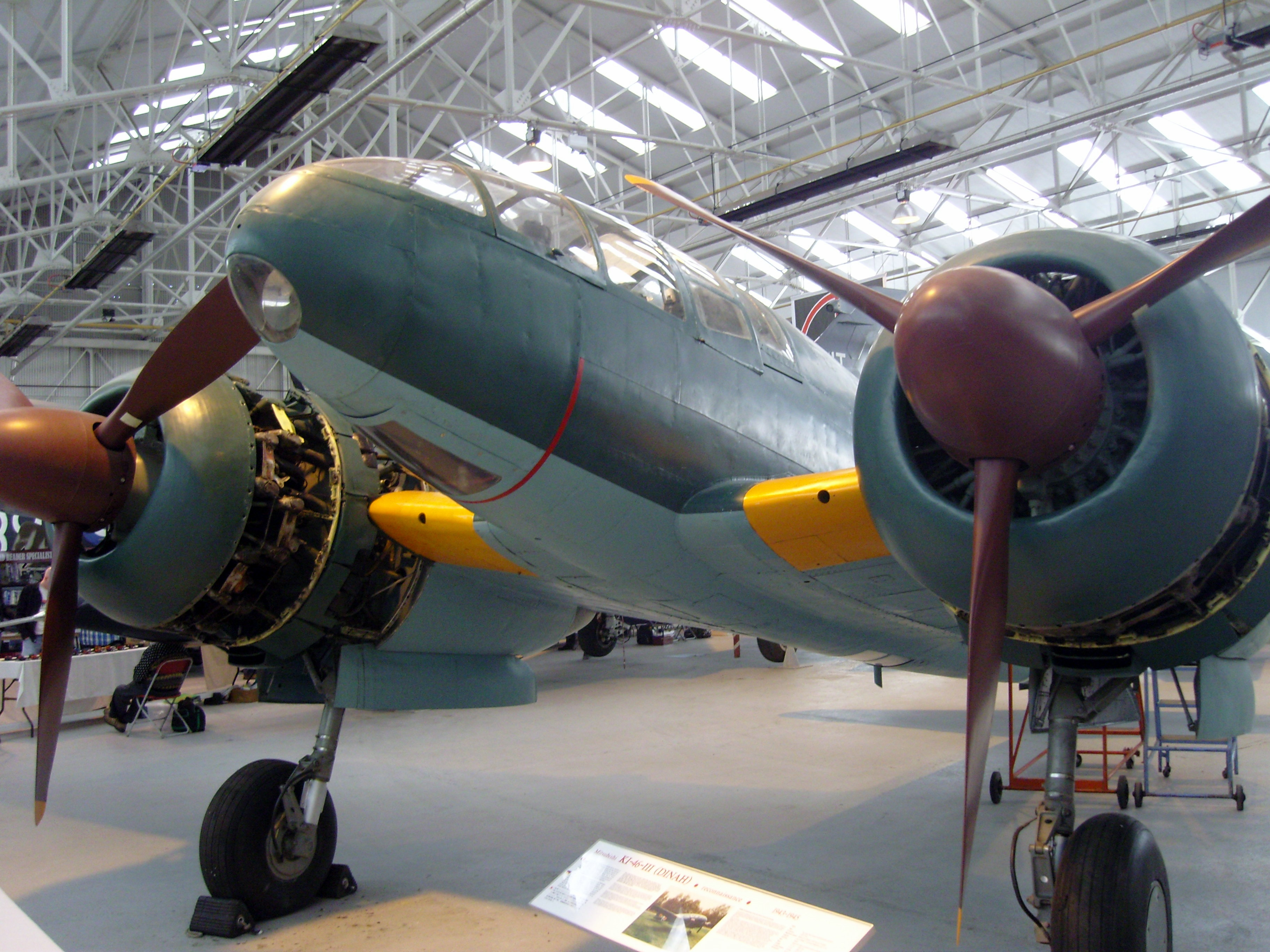
The British-preserved Mitsubishi Ki-46-III "Dinah" with its characteristic stepless cockpit, rare in Japanese WW II aircraft

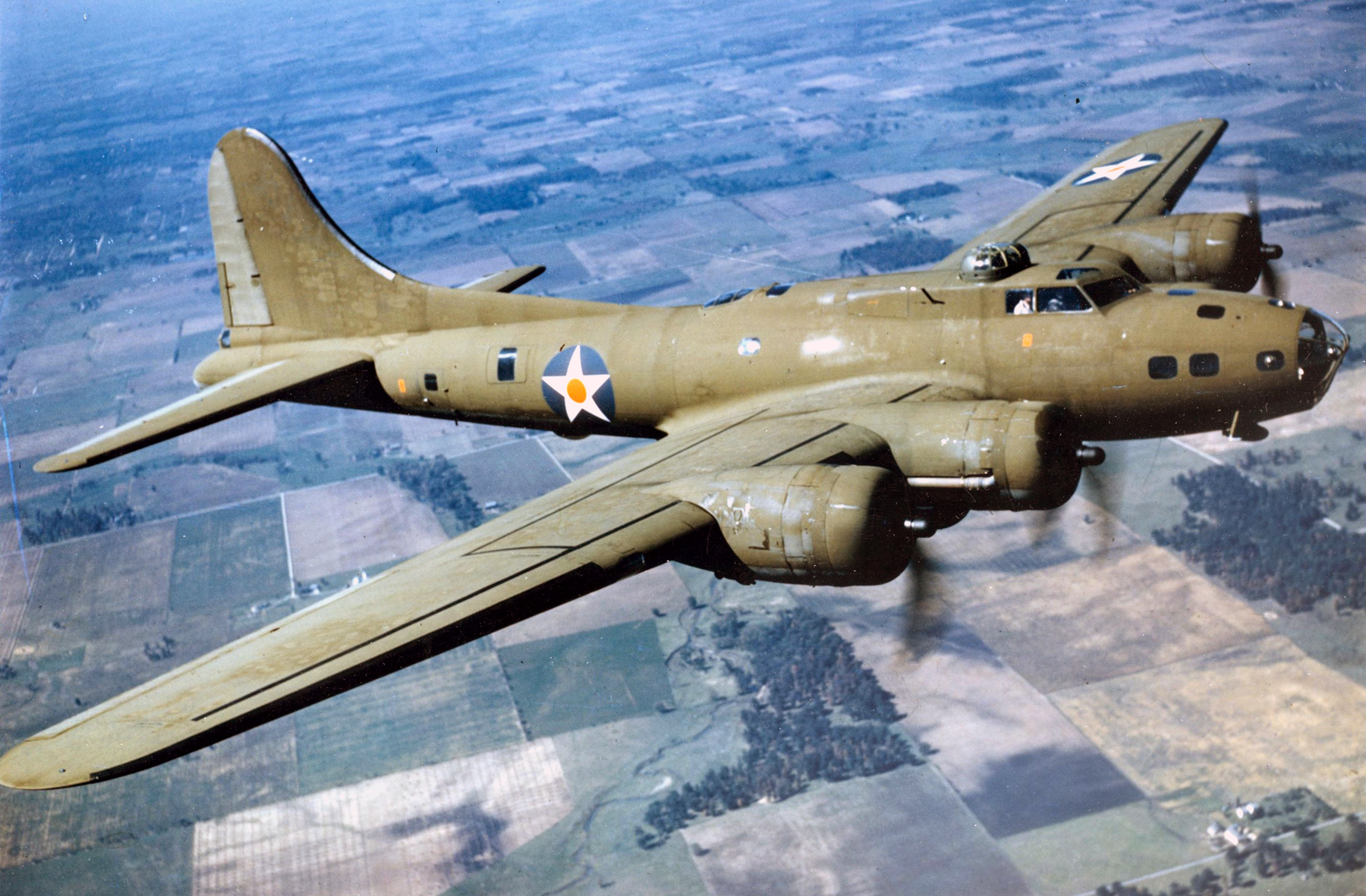
B-17 Flying Fortress. Note the stepped cockpit design.

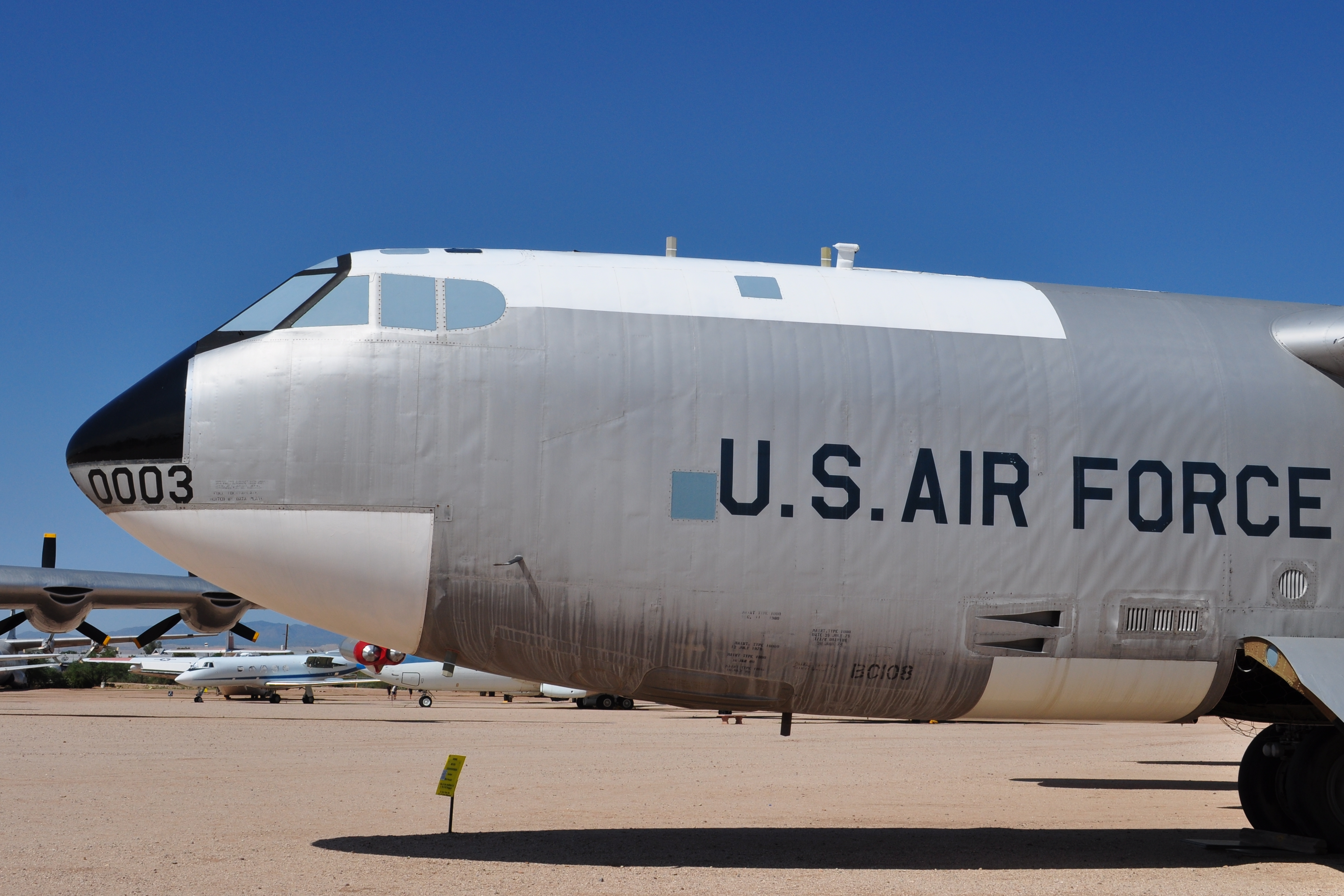
A B-52A in storage shows off an unbroken, "stepless" nose profile; the cockpit glazing was for the pilot and co-pilot.
