= Gondola (airplane) =

Part of some World War II-era military bomber aircraft

A gondola was a ventral casemate-style structure used on many World War II-era military bomber aircraft, especially on German designs, where they were usually known as Bodenlafette, often shortened to Bola (from German Boden, 'floor', + Lafette 'gun carriage or mounting', from French l'affût, gun carriage).

Gondolas housed either a gunner or a bombardier.

== Gallery ==
Examples of gondolas on World War II military aircraft:

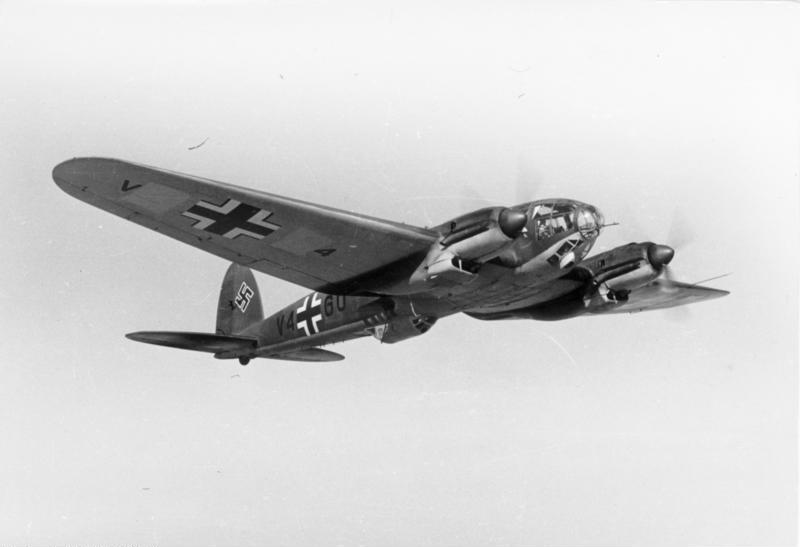
Heinkel He 111H bomber with its bola gondola just behind the bomb bay

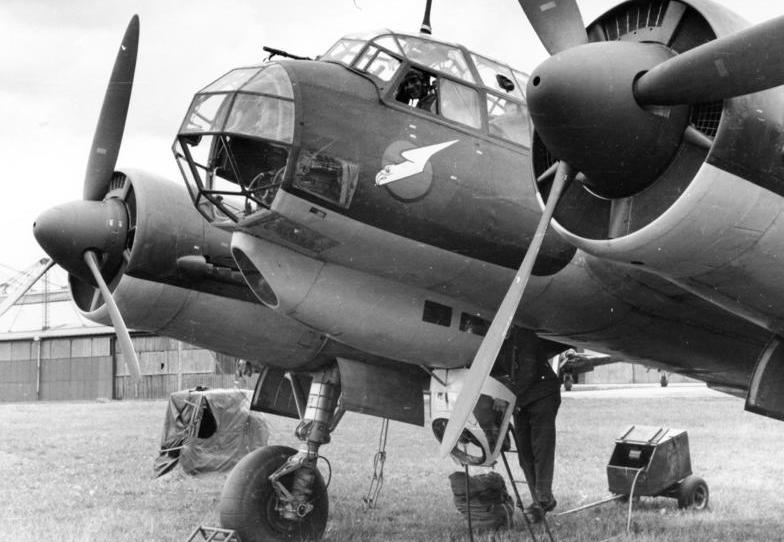
Junkers Ju 88A bomber's nose, clearly showing the classic bodenlafette, or bola, undernose form of gondola fitted, in one form or another, to almost all German bomber designs of World War II

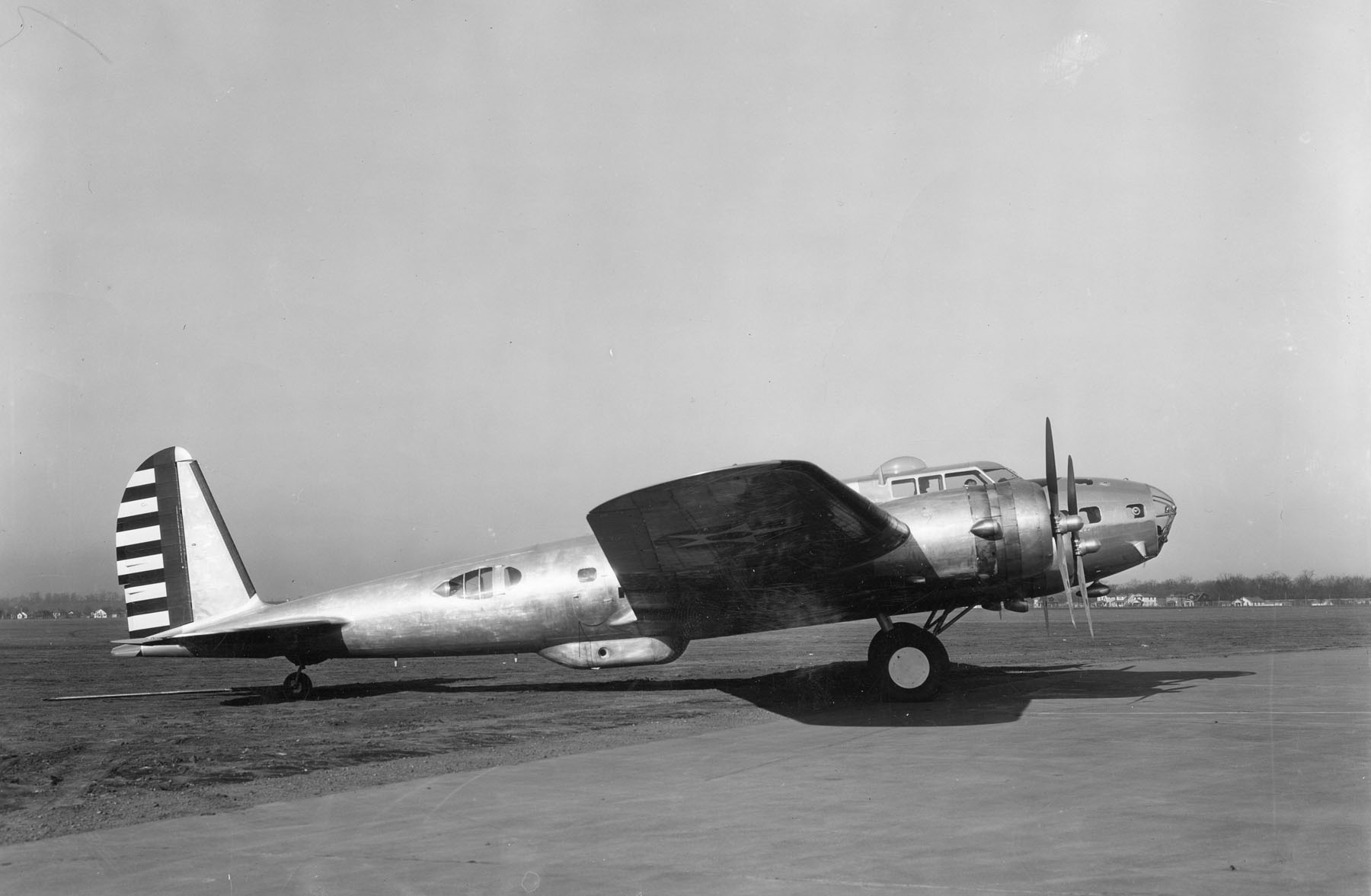
B-17D Flying Fortress of 1940, having its "bathtub" gondola in virtually the same location as the He 111H

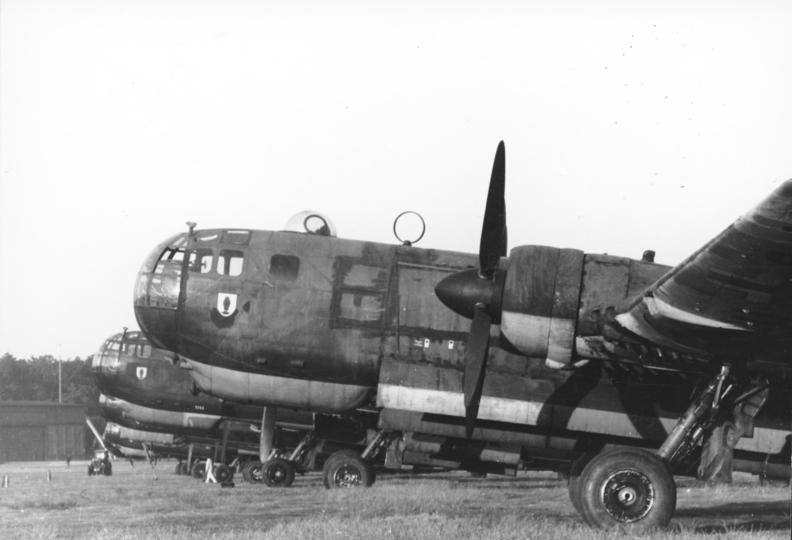
Heinkel He 177As, with the foreground aircraft's nose prominently showing the bulky bola under the cabin

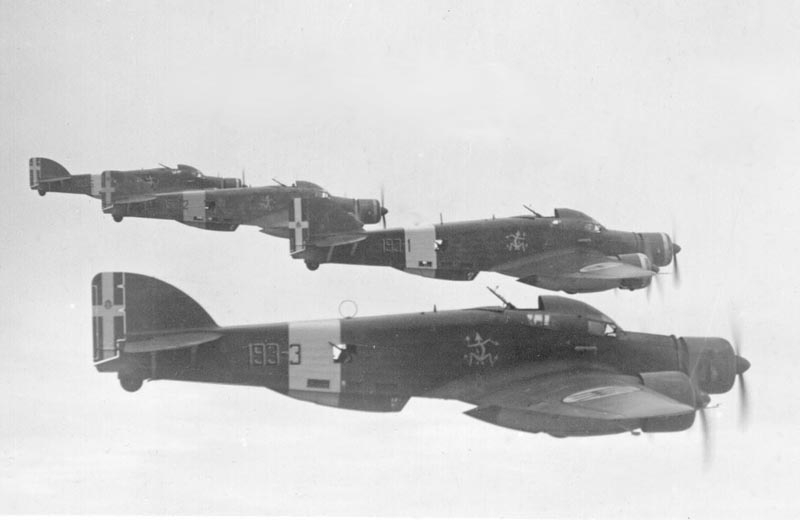
A flight of four Italian Savoia-Marchetti SM.79 Sparviero trimotor bombers, each with a similar gondola behind the bomb bay, but primarily used for the bombardier on this design, because of the nose-mounted engine taking up a bombardier's usual location

== See also ==
Other types of aircraft equipped with gondolas:

- Airship
- Balloon (aircraft)
