= List of World War II firearms of Germany =

The following is a list of World War II German Firearms which includes German firearms, prototype firearms and captured foreign firearms used by the Wehrmacht, Luftwaffe, Waffen-SS, Deutsches Heer, the Volkssturm and other military armed forces in World War II.

== Knives ==
• Seitengewehr 42

• Seitengewehr 98

• S84/98 III bayonet

== Sidearms ==
Picture	Name	Manufacturer	Cartridge	Primary User	Note	References
	Astra 300	Astra-Unceta y Cia SA	7.65×17mm SR; 9×17mm Kurz	Luftwaffe	85,390 delivered from 1941 to 1944.	
	Astra 400	Astra-Unceta y Cia SA	9×23mm Largo	Luftwaffe	6,000 purchased in 1941.	
	Astra 600	Astra-Unceta y Cia SA	9×19mm Parabellum	Luftwaffe	10,450 Astra 600s had been delivered to Germany until German occupation of France ceased. The remainder of the German order, consisting of 28,000 pistols, was intercepted by Allied forces in September 1944.	
	Astra 900	Astra-Unceta y Cia SA	7.63×25mm Mauser	Wehrmacht	1,050 delivered in March 1943.	
Browning Hi-Power	Browning Hi-Power	Fabrique Nationale d'Herstal	9×19mm Parabellum	Waffen-SS; Fallschirmjäger	319,000 manufactured under German occupation. Designated Pistole 640(b) in German service.	
	ČZ vz. 27	Böhmische Waffenfabrik (Czech made under German occupation (after mid-March 1939))	7.65 mm Browning/.32 ACP	Wehrmacht; Gestapo	All ČZ 27's Produced for German use were all marked on the slide with "Pistole Modell 27 Kal 7.65" with the addition of "Böhmische Waffenfabrik Prag."	-
Dreyse Model 1907	Dreyse M1907	Rheinmetall	7.65×17mm SR	Wehrmacht	Only a few thousands of the pistols were produced during WW2	
	FÉG 37M	Fémárú, Fegyver- és Gépgyár	7.65×17mm SR	Luftwaffe	Examples produced for German use included a manual safety, which was absent from the Hungarian-issue version. Designated Pistole 37(u) in German service.	
	FN Model 1910	Fabrique Nationale de Herstal	7.65×17mm Browning	Wehrmacht; Luftwaffe	The FN M1910 was produced under the German occupation. Designated "Pistole 621" in German service.	-
	FN Model 1922	Fabrique Nationale de Herstal	7.65×17mm Browning; 9×17mm Browning	Wehrmacht; Luftwaffe; Waffen-SS	The FN M1922 was mainly produced for the Luftwaffe, Also used by Wehrmacht, SS, Reich Government Officials, but oddly enough was still sold commercially up until 1942.	-
	Kongsberg Colt	Kongsberg Vaapenfabrikk	.45 ACP	Wehrmacht	8,200 were produced during German occupation. Designated as Pistole 657(n) in German service.	-
	Luger P08 pistol	Deutsche Waffen und Munitionsfabriken; Mauser-Werke	9×19mm Parabellum	Wehrmacht; Luftwaffe; Waffen-SS	The Luger P08's production was taken over by Mauser after World War I.	
	Luger M1902 Carbine	Deutsche Waffen und Munitionsfabriken; Mauser-Werke	9x19mm Parabellum	Wehrmacht; Waffen-SS	A few were seen used by the Wehrmacht and Waffen-SS in 1944.	
Mauser HSc	Mauser HSc	Mauser-Werke	7.65×17mm SR	Kriegsmarine; Deutsches Heer; Luftwaffe; Waffen-SS; Gestapo; Kriminalpolizei	Originally produced as a commercial pistol, The Mauser HSc was fully adopted by the Kriegsmarine, Luftwaffe, Deutsches Heer (German Army), the Waffen-SS the Gestapo and the Kriminalpolizei in 1943.	
Mauser HSc	Mauser C96	Mauser-Werke	7.63×25mm Mauser; 9×19mm Parabellum	Wehrmacht; Waffen-SS; Luftwaffe	The Mauser C96 was adopted in 1942 and the M1930 variant was delivered to the Luftwaffe.	
P MAB	MAB Model D	Manufacture d'Armes de Bayonne	7.65×17mm Browning SR	Wehrmacht	After German forces occupied France, the MAB Model D was adopted for use by the Wehrmacht during World War II.	
Radom Vis	Radom wz.35 Vis	Łucznik Arms Factory, Radom	9×19mm Parabellum	Fallschirmjäger; Feldgendarmerie	Designated Pistole 645(p) in German service.	
Steyr M1912	Steyr M1912	Steyr Mannlicher	9×19mm Parabellum; 9×23mm Steyr	Wehrmacht	When the Austrian Army was absorbed, existing Steyr M1912 pistols were rechambered to fire 9mm Parabellum rounds. Designated Pistole 12(ö) in German service.	>
	Sauer 38H	Sauer & Sohn	7.65×17mm SR	Wehrmacht; Luftwaffe	The manual safety on the Sauer 38H was excluded on pistols produced between 1944 and 1945.	
	Star Model B	Star Bonifacio Echeverria	9×19mm Parabellum	Luftwaffe	Similar to the Colt M1911 and 25,000 delivered prior to liberation of France.	
-	Volkspistole	Mauser-Werke; Carl Walther GmbH; Gustloff-Werke	9×19mm Parabellum	-	An emergency weapon production can be traced to Mauser and Walther, but full identification is still uncertain.	
Walther_P38	Walther P38	Carl Walther GmbH; Mauser-Werke; Spreewerke GmbH	9×19mm Parabellum	Wehrmacht; Luftwaffe; Waffen-SS; Gestapo; Kriminalpolizei	The standard issue pistol of the Wehrmacht.	
Walther PP	Walther PP	Carl Walther GmbH	7.65×17mm SR	Wehrmacht; Luftwaffe; Waffen-SS; Gestapo; Kriminalpolizei	Produced and used by Wehrmacht, Luftwaffe, Waffen-SS, the Gestapo and the Kriminalpolizei in WW2.	
	Walther PPK	Carl Walther GmbH	7.65×17mm SR; 9×17mm Kurz	Wehrmacht; Luftwaffe; Waffen-SS; Gestapo; Kriminalpolizei	Similar to the PP but shorter version used mostly by Kriminalpolizei during WW2.	
	Walther Model 8	Carl Walther GmbH	.25 ACP	Luftwaffe; Panzerwaffe	3,090 pistols were delivered to the Luftwaffe and the Panzerwaffe in 1941.	
	Walther Model 9	Carl Walther GmbH	.25 ACP	Wehrmacht; Luftwaffe; Panzerwaffe	298 pistols were delivered to the Wehrmacht in 1940–1945.	
	Pistolet automatique modèle 1935A	Société Alsacienne de Constructions Mécaniques	7.65×20mm Longue	Wehrmacht	Captured in 1944 and designated as Pistole 625(f).	
	Colt M1911	Colt Manufacturing Company	.45 ACP	Wehrmacht; Volkssturm	Designated as Pistole 660(a).	
	Smith & Wesson M1917	Smith & Wesson	.45 ACP	Wehrmacht; Volkssturm	Designated as Revolver 661(a).	
	Colt M1917	Colt Manufacturing Company	.45 ACP	Wehrmacht; Volkssturm	Designated as Revolver 662(a).	
Bodeo M1889	Bodeo M1889 Revolver	Societa Siderurgica Glisenti	10.35mm Ordinanza Italiana	Wehrmacht	A revolver produced in Kingdom of Italy in WW1, some these revolvers were used by the Wehrmacht and designated as Revolver 680(i).	

== Rifles ==
Picture	Name	Manufacturer	Cartridge	Primary User	Note	References
Fallschirmjägergewehr 42	Fallschirmjägergewehr 42	Rheinmetall-Borsig; Heinrich Krieghoff Waffenfabrik; L. O. Dietrich	7.92×57mm Mauser	Fallschirmjäger	Approximately 2,000 produced of first variation, 5,000 of second and third variations.	
Gewehr 24(t)	Gewehr 24(t)	Československá Zbrojovka Brno	7.92×57mm Mauser	Wehrmacht	Modification of Czechoslovak vz. 24 rifle to more closely conform with standard-issue Karabiner 98k. 330,050 produced in occupied Czechoslovakia from 1938 to 1943.	
	Gewehr 29/40(ö)	FB "Łucznik" Radom	7.92×57mm Mauser	Kriegsmarine Luftwaffe	Modification of Polish vz. 29 rifle to more closely conform with standard-issue Karabiner 98k. The factory was run by the Austrian firm Steyr.	
Gewehr_33/40_(t)	Gewehr 33/40(t)	Československá Zbrojovka Brno	7.92×57mm Mauser	Wehrmacht	Adaptation of Czechoslovak vz. 33. 131,503 produced from 1940 to 1942 for German use.	
Gewehr 41(M)	Gewehr 41(M)	Mauser-Werke	7.92×57mm Mauser	-	Mauser self-loading rifle design tested in 1941, not accepted for service.	
Gewehr 41(W)	Gewehr 41(W)	Carl Walther GmbH	7.92×57mm Mauser	Wehrmacht	Walther self-loading rifle adopted as standard in 1942 but superseded by improved Gewehr 43.	
-	Gewehr 43 Sniper Rifle	Carl Walther GmBH	7.92x57mm Mauser	Wehrmacht; Waffen-SS	A sniper variant of the Gewehr 43 rifle.	
Gewehr 43/Karabiner 43	Gewehr 43/Karabiner 43	Carl Walther GmbH	7.92×57mm Mauser	Wehrmacht; Waffen-SS	Modification of Gewehr 41(W) to gas operation, later renamed Karabiner 43.	
	Gewehr 88	Steyr-Mannlicher various others	M/88; 7.92×57mm Mauser	Volkssturm	The Gewehr 88 was the first rifle adopted by Germany that used Smokeless powder.	
Gewehr 98	Gewehr 98	Mauser-Werke various others	7.92×57mm Mauser	Wehrmacht; Waffen-SS; Volkssturm	Standard German infantry rifle of World War I. Saw limited use in World War II, including issue to Adolf Hitler's SS bodyguard unit.	
-	Gewehr 98 Sniper Rifle	Mauser-Werke various others	7.92x57mm Mauser	Wehrmacht; Waffen-SS	Sniper version of the Gewehr 98 Rifle.	
	Gewehr 98/40	Fémárú, Fegyver- és Gépgyár	7.92×57mm Mauser	Wehrmacht	Adaptation of Hungarian 35M rifle to fire 7.92×57mm Mauser ammunition and to mount German bayonets. 138,400 produced from 1941 to 1944.	
Karabiner_98a	Karabiner 98a	Mauser-Werke various others	7.92×57mm Mauser	Wehrmacht		
	Karabiner 98b	Mauser-Werke various others	7.92×57mm Mauser	Wehrmacht		
Karabiner 98k	Karabiner 98k	Mauser-Werke various others	7.92×57mm Mauser	Wehrmacht; Kriegsmarine; Luftwaffe; Waffen-SS	Adopted as standard German infantry rifle in 1935. Over 14 million produced from 1934 until German surrender in 1945.	
Karabiner 98k Sniper Rifle	Karabiner 98k Sniper Rifle	Mauser-Werke various others	7.92x57mm Mauser	Wehrmacht; Kriegsmarine; Luftwaffe; Waffen-SS	Sniper version of the Karabiner 98k with Sniper Scope	
Maschinenkarabiner 42(H)	Maschinenkarabiner 42(H)	C. G. Haenel	7.92×33mm Kurz	Wehrmacht Fallschirmjäger Waffen-SS	Accepted after troop trials in 1943, about 8,000 produced. Served as basis for MP 43.	
Maschinenkarabiner 42(W)	Maschinenkarabiner 42(W)	Carl Walther GmbH	7.92×33mm Kurz	Wehrmacht	A competitor of the Maschinenkarabiner 42(H) from Walther. About 3,000-5,000 produced.	
M30_Luftwaffe_drilling	M30 Luftwaffe drilling	Sauer & Sohn	9.3x74mmR, 12 Gauge	Luftwaffe	M30 Luftwaffe drilling was a combination double barrel shotgun issued as survival weapon for Luftwaffe aircrews.	
Sturmgewehr 44	Sturmgewehr 44	C. G. Haenel	7.92×33mm Kurz	Wehrmacht; Waffen-SS; Volksgrenadier	Evolved from MKb 42(H). First series completed in July 43, first combat use in Eastern Front. Initially named Maschinenpistole 43 and then Maschinenpistole 44.	
Sturmgewehr_45(M)	Sturmgewehr 45(M)	Mauser-Werke	7.92×33mm Kurz	Wehrmacht	Experimental lightweight selective-fire weapon, with roller-delayed blowback system, only prototypes built prior to end of war. Forerunner of the Spanish CETME 58.	
Volkssturm_Gewehr_VG_1-5	Volkssturmgewehr/Gewehr 1-5	Gustloff-Werke	7.92×33mm Kurz	Volkssturm	Intended as a cheap and mass-produced self-loading, semi-automatic weapon. First series completed in late 1944.	
-	Sturmgewehr 1-5	Gustloff-Werke	7.92x33mm Kurz	-	A proposed version of the Gewehr 1-5 that had a firing-selector, and could be switched from fully-automatic and semi-automatic.	
-	Hessische Selbstladekarabiner	Hessische Industrie Werke	7.92×57mm IS (Rifle); 7.92x33mm Kurz (Carbine)	Volkssturm	Produced a few of this rifle in 1944-1945 issued to Volkssturm.	
	Volksgewehr VG-1	Gustloff-Werke	7.92x57mm Mauser	Volkssturm	A bolt action rifle with a 10-round detachable box magazine	
	Volkssturmgewehr VG-2	Gustloff-Werke	7.92x57mm Mauser	Volkssturm	A bolt action rifle with a 10-round detachable box magazine.	
-	Volkssturmgewehr VG-3	Gustloff-Werke	7.92x33mm Kurz	Volkssturm	A light bolt action carbine that uses StG-44's 30 round detachable box magazine.	
-	Volkssturmgewehr VG-4	Gustloff-Werke	7.92x57mm Mauser	Volkssturm	A bolt action rifle with a 5-round internal magazine.	
-	Erma/Walther Volkssturmgewehr	Erma-Werke; Carl Walther GmbH	7.92x33mm Kurz	Volkssturm	A last-ditch semi-automatic carbine with a 10 or 30 round detachable box magazine.	
-	VK-98	Gustloff-Werke	7.92x57mm Mauser	Volkssturm	A bolt action rifle with a 10-round internal magazine.	
-	Gewehr 43K	Carl Walther GmbH	7.92x33mm Kurz	Wehrmacht; Volkssturm	Similar to the Gewehr 43 rifle but the difference is the rifle uses a 30-round StG-44's magazine.	
-	Knorr-Bremse Paratrooper Rifle	Knorr-Bremse	7.92x57mm Mauser	-	A prototype automatic rifle designed in 1941–1942 to complete against the FG-42 rifle, the rate of fire of this rifle is about 500 to 550.	
	Grossfuss Sturmgewehr	Metall- und Lackwarenfabrik Johannes Großfuß	7.92x33mm Kurz	-	Only 9 were produced during the Battle of Berlin and the Soviets found five of these were at the Kummersdorf testing site after the battle.	
	Mauser StG 45 Kurz	Mauser-Werke	7.92x33mm Kurz	-	The Mauser's design of the StG-45(M).	
	Wimmersperg Spz-Kr	-	7.92x33mm Kurz	-	A bullpup assault rifle designed in 1945.	
-	Rheinmetall VG45K	Rheinmetall	7.92x57mm Mauser	Volkssturm	A bolt action rifle with a 30-round StG-44's magazine and designed for the Volkssturm during the final phase of World War II in Europe.	

== Machine guns ==
Picture	Name	Manufacturer	Cartridge	Primary User	Note	References
Maschinengewehr 08	Maschinengewehr 08	DWM; Spandau; Erfurt	7.92×57mm Mauser	Wehrmacht	Standard machine gun of World War I. Saw limited use in World War II.	
	Maschinengewehr 15	Rheinmetall	7.92×57mm Mauser	Luftwaffe; Wehrmacht	The MG 15 was at the beginning of the war mainly used on aircraft of the Luftwaffe. After being replaced by other machine guns many MG 15s were modified for use by ground forces.	
Maschinengewehr 30	Maschinengewehr 30	Steyr-Daimler-Puch	7.92×57mm Mauser	Luftwaffe; Wehrmacht	Rejected by the Reichswehr but accepted by the Luftwaffe for aircraft use. Later transferred to Wehrmacht ground units.	
Maschinengewehr 30(t)	ZB vz. 30	Československá Zbrojovka Brno	7.92×57mm Mauser	Waffen-SS	Czechoslovak ZB vz. 30 produced under German occupation for Waffen-SS use.	
Maschinengewehr 34	Maschinengewehr 34	Mauser-Werke various others	7.92×57mm Mauser	Wehrmacht; Kriegsmarine; Luftwaffe; Waffen-SS	Adapted from MG30 and adopted as standard machine gun in 1934. Issued to German troops starting in 1935.	
Maschinengewehr 42	Maschinengewehr 42	Mauser-Werke; Steyr-Daimler-Puch; Gustloff Werke	7.92×57mm Mauser	Wehrmacht; Luftwaffe; Waffen-SS	Successor to MG34, adopted in 1942. Over 400,000 produced prior to German surrender.	
MG45	MG 45	n/a	7.92×57mm Mauser	n/a	Emergency alternative to the MG42 and only 10 were produced during the Battle of Berlin.	
	Barnitzke machine gun	n/a	7.92×57mm Mauser	n/a	Proposed MG42 replacement using an unusual delayed blowback operation.	
	MG 81	n/a	7.92×57mm Mauser	Luftwaffe	Machine gun used by the Luftwaffe.	
Kg m/40 Automatic Rifle	Kg m/40 Automatic Rifle	Knorr-Bremse	6.5×55mm Swedish	Waffen-SS	A few thousands of these guns delivered for the Waffen-SS, under the name MG35/36A. In 1940, the Waffen-SS decided to replace the 36A variant because it is unreliable and sometimes the wooden stock fell off.	
	Maschinengewehr 13	Dreyse	7.92×57mm Mauser	Luftwaffe Kriegsmarine	Produced in the 1930s issued to Luftwaffe aircrews and Kriegsmarine until the MG 34 was introduced in 1934.	
-	Maschinengewehr 39 Rh	Rheinmetall	7.92×57mm Mauser	Wehrmacht; Luftwaffe; Kriegsmarine	A general-purpose machine gun designed in 1937 issued to Wehrmacht, Luftwaffe and Kriegsmarine.	
	Maschinengewehr M. 7	Steyr	7.92×57mm Mauser	Heer	A machine gun designed in 1904 and was seen rarely used by the German Army (Heer).	
	ZB vz. 26	Zbrojovka Brno, Zastava Arms	8×57mm IS	Wehrmacht; Waffen-SS	The Wehrmacht soon adopted the ZB-26 after the occupation of Czechoslovakia, renaming it the MG 26(t), it was used in the same role as the MG 34, as a light machine gun. In the opening phases of World War II, the ZB-26 in 7.92 mm Mauser caliber was used in large numbers by elements of the German Waffen-SS, who at first did not have full access to standard Wehrmacht supply channels.	
	ZB-53	Zbrojovka Brno	7.92×57mm Mauser	Waffen-SS	During the German occupation of the factory, large numbers were produced for the Waffen-SS until 1942.	

== Submachine guns/Machine pistols ==
Picture	Name	Manufacturer	Cartridge	Primary User	Note	References
Beretta Model 38/42	Beretta Model 38/42	Beretta	9×19mm Parabellum	Wehrmacht; Waffen-SS; Fallschirmjäger	Designated Maschinenpistole 738(i) in German service.	
Beretta Model 38/44	Beretta Model 38/44	Beretta	9×19mm Parabellum	Wehrmacht; Waffen-SS; Fallschirmjäger	Designated Maschinenpistole 739(i) in German service.	
	Erma EMP	Československá Zbrojovka Brno	9×19mm Parabellum	Waffen-SS	Not officially adopted, but used in small numbers by the Waffen-SS.	
	Mauser M712 Schnellfeuer	Mauser-Werke	7.63×25mm Mauser	Wehrmacht; Waffen-SS; Kriegsmarine	A fully automatic version of the Mauser C96 pistol with a 10 or 20 rounds detachable box magazine, the rate of fire is about 900 to 1000.	
Maschinenpistole 18	MP18	Bergmann Waffenfabrik	9×19mm Parabellum	Wehrmacht; Volkssturm		
Maschinenpistole 28	MP28	Bergmann Waffenfabrik	9×19mm Parabellum	Wehrmacht; Volkssturm	Improved version of MP18.	
Maschinenpistole 34	MP34	Waffenfabrik Steyr	9×19mm Parabellum; 9×23mm Steyr	Wehrmacht; Waffen-SS; Feldgendarmerie	Designed by Rheinmetall but produced in Austria by Steyr to evade Treaty of Versailles restrictions. After the Anschluss, produced from 1938 to 1940 for the Waffen-SS. Pre-Anschluss Austrian examples designated Maschinenpistole 34(ö) in German service.	
Maschinenpistole 35	MP35	Bergmann	9×19mm Parabellum	Wehrmacht; Waffen-SS	Produced from 1935 to 1944. Used primarily by the Waffen-SS.	
Maschinenpistole 38	MP38	Erma Werke	9×19mm Parabellum	Wehrmacht; Waffen-SS; Feldgendarmerie; Fallschirmjäger	Used primarily by the Feldgendarmerie in World War II.	
Maschinenpistole 40	MP40	Erma Werke	9×19mm Parabellum	Wehrmacht; Waffen-SS; Fallschirmjäger; Gestapo	The MP40 is an improved version of MP38, utilizing stamped metal parts for easier mass production and the standard issue submachine gun in World War II.	
Maschinenpistole 41	MP41	Haenel	9×19mm Parabellum	Waffen-SS	Combined the receiver, operating mechanism, and magazine housing of the MP40 and the stock, trigger and fire selector of the MP28.	
	MP3008	Ludwig Vorgrimler	9×19mm Parabellum	Wehrmacht; Volkssturm	Based on British Sten Mk II, designed as an easy to manufacture last-ditch weapon. Approximately 10,000 produced in 1945.	
Suomi KP/-31	Suomi KP/-31	Tikkakoski Oy	9×19mm Parabellum	Wehrmacht; Waffen-SS	3,042 purchased from Finland.	
ZK-383	ZK-383	Československá Zbrojovka Brno	9×19mm Parabellum	Waffen-SS	Produced in occupied Czechoslovakia for Waffen-SS use.	
MAS-38	MAS-38	-	7.65mm Longue	Wehrmacht	The Germans accepted the gun as a substitute standard weapon, naming it the 7.65 mm MP722(f). They continued production of the gun for their own armed forces and supplied some to the Vichy French.	
Danuvia 39M/43M	Danuvia 39M/43M	Danuvia	9×25mm Mauser Export	Wehrmacht	Some of this guns were delivered to the Wehrmacht in WW2.	
	Orița M1941	Uzinele Metallurgice Copșa Mică și Cugir	9x19mm Parabellum	Wehrmacht	A small quantity of these guns was used by the Wehrmacht during the last two years of WW2.	
	Astra 902	Astra-Unceta y Cia SA	7.63×25mm Mauser	Wehrmacht	A fully automatic version of the Astra 900 pistol but it has a 20 rounds internal box magazine.	
	Astra 904	Astra-Unceta y Cia SA	7.63×25mm Mauser 9mmLargo	Wehrmacht	Another fully automatic version of the Astra 900 pistol but it has a 10 or 20 rounds detachable box magazine. In 1943, some delivered to the Wehrmacht.	
-	MP 41(r)	Numerous	9x19mm Parabellum	Wehrmacht	A captured PPSh-41 converted to 9×19mm Parabellum caliber for use by German forces.	
	MP 717(r)	Numerous	7.63×25mm Mauser	Wehrmacht	A captured, unconverted PPSh-41 placed in German service and supplied with 7.63×25mm Mauser ammunition	
	TZ-45	Fabbrica Fratelli Giandoso	9×19mm Parabellum	Wehrmacht (possibly)	A few TZ-45 were possibly used by the Wehrmacht forces engaged in similar operations.	
	EMP 44	Erma Werke	9x19mm Parabellum	-	A prototype submachine gun designed in 1942 but it was rejected due to its failure to pass acceptance tests.	
	Sten	Numerous	9x19mm Parabellum	Wehrmacht	2,457 were captured by the German Army and designated as MP-748(e) for the Mk I to MP-752(e) for the Mk V.	

== Anti-Tank Weapons ==
Picture	Name	Manufacturer	Cartridge	Primary User	Note	References
Granatbüchse 39	Granatbüchse 39	Gustloff Werke	-	Wehrmacht	Conversion of Panzerbüchse 39 to launch rifle grenades.	
-	Panzerbüchse 38	Gustloff Werke	7.92×94mm	Wehrmacht		
Panzerbüchse 39	Panzerbüchse 39	Gustloff Werke	7.92×94mm	Wehrmacht	Improved version of Panzerbüchse 38.	
Panzerfaust	Panzerfaust	-	100mm anti-tank grenade	Wehrmacht; Waffen-SS	Disposable recoilless single-shot anti-tank grenade launcher.	
Raketenpanzerbüchse 43	Raketenpanzerbüchse 43	-	88mm rocket	Wehrmacht; Waffen-SS	Popularly referred to as Panzerschreck. Enlarged version of American M1A1 Bazooka.	
Raketenpanzerbüchse 54	Raketenpanzerbüchse 54	-	88mm rocket	Wehrmacht; Waffen-SS	Improved version of the Raketenpanzerbüchse 43, adding a blast shield.	
Solothurn S-18/1000	Solothurn S-18/1000	Solothurn	20×138mmB	Wehrmacht; Waffen-SS		
Solothurn_S-18/1100	Solothurn S-18/1100	Solothurn	20×138mmB	Wehrmacht; Waffen-SS	Full-automatic version of the Solothurn S-18/1000.	
Sturmpistole	Sturmpistole	-	-	Wehrmacht	Modification of standard flare guns to launch grenades	
	Karabin przeciwpancerny wz.35	Państwowa Fabryka Karabinów	7.92×107mm DS	Wehrmacht; Waffen-SS	Captured, as PzB 35 (p) and then later renamed PzB 770 (p). Some copies were acquired from Italy after the Armistice of Cassibile and designated PzB 770 (i).	
-	PzB M.SS.41	Česká zbrojovka Uherský Brod	7.92×94mm Patronen	Wehrmacht	Produced in Czechoslovakia under German occupation.	

== Anti-Aircraft Weapons ==
Light Anti-Aircraft Guns

• Fliegerfaust hand-held anti-air rocket launcher produced in 1945

• Solothurn ST-5 caliber 20 mm (.79 in)

• 2 cm Flak 30/38/Flakvierling – the most produced German artillery piece of World War II, based on Russian 2-K AA gun design which was too complex to mass-produce in USSR

• 25 mm Hotchkiss anti-aircraft gun (captured from French)

• Gebirgsflak 38 – reduced-weight version of 2 cm Flak 30/38/Flakvierling

• 3.7 cm SK C/30 – naval AA gun

• 3.7 cm FlaK 43

• 3.7 cm Flak 18/36/37/43

• 37 mm automatic air defense gun M1939 (61-K) (captured from Russia by Wehrmacht and redesignated 3.7 cm M39(r))

• Schräge Musik – also independently developed by Imperial Japanese Naval Air Service (both in use by May 1943

• 5 cm FlaK 41

• SG 116

• Henschel Hs 297 – launch 35 73mm-caliber short-range rockets

• Jagdfaust – air-to-air vertical-fire automated cannon

Heavy Anti-Aircraft Guns

• Rheintochter (surface-to-air rocket)

• Cannone da 75/46 C.A. modello 34 (acquired from Italy) • 76 mm air defense gun M1938 (captured from Russia by Wehrmacht and redesignated Flak 38(r))

• 8.8 cm Flak 18/36/37/41 AT/AA gun

• 85 mm air defense gun M1939 (52-K) (captured from Russia by Wehrmacht and redesignated 8.5 cm Flak 39(r))

• 10.5 cm FlaK 38

• 12.8 cm FlaK 40

• 12.8 cm FlaK 40 twin mount

• Cannone da 90/53 AA/AT gun

== Explosives, hand-held anti-tank, incendiary weapons and mines ==
Grenades and Grenade Launchers

Picture	Name	Manufacturer	Primary User	Note	References
	Stielhandgranate Model 1924	Various	Wehrmacht Heer	The standard grenade of the Wehrmacht and Germany army during WW2.	
	Stielhandgranate "Geballte Ladung"	Various	Wehrmacht Heer	An anti-tank variant of the Stielhandgranate Model 1924.	
	Stielhandgranate Model 1943	Various	Wehrmacht Heer	-	
	Blendkörper 1H	Various	Wehrmacht	A non-lethal smoke grenade that was developed by Germany and used by the Wehrmacht during WW2.	
	Blendkörper 2H	Various	Wehrmacht	-	
	Gewehr-Granatpatrone 40	Various	Luftwaffe; Fallschirmjäger	-	
	Gewehr-Panzergranate	Various	Wehrmacht	-	
	Gewehr-Sprenggranate	Various	Wehrmacht	-	
	Gross Gewehr-Panzergranate	Various	Wehrmacht	-	
	Gross Panzergranate 46 & 61	Various	Waffen-SS	-	
	Hafthohlladung	Various	Wehrmacht	-	
	Eihandgranate Model 39	Various	Wehrmacht	-	
	Molotov Cocktail	Various	Wehrmacht; Waffen-SS	-	
	Panzerwurfkörper 42	Various	Wehrmacht	The panzerwurfkörper 42 was designed to be fired from a Leuchtpistole.	
	Panzerwurfmine	Various	Luftwaffe	-	
	Propaganda-Gewehrgranate	Various	Wehrmacht	-	
	Schießbecher	Various	Wehrmacht	-	
	Sprengpatrone	Various	Wehrmacht	The sprengpatrone was designed to be fired from a Kampfpistole flare gun.	
	Wurfgranate Patrone 326	Various	Wehrmacht	The wurfgranate patrone 326 was designed to be fired from a Leuchtpistole	
	Wurfkörper 361	Various	Wehrmacht	The wurfkörper 361 was designed to be fired from a Leuchtpistole	

Mines and Anti-Tank Mines

Picture	Name	Manufacturer	Primary User	Note	References
	Tellermine	Various	Wehrmacht	The standard mine of the Wehrmacht.	
	Topfmine	Various	Wehrmacht	-	
	Schrapnellmine	Various	Wehrmacht	Nicknamed the "bouncing betty" by the western front.	
	Schu-mine 42	Various	Wehrmacht	-	
	Riegel mine 43	Various	Wehrmacht	-	
	Panzer stab 43	Various	Wehrmacht	-	
	Holzmine 42	Various	Wehrmacht	-	

== See also ==
- List of equipment used in World War II
- List of German military equipment of World War II
- List of World War II Luftwaffe aircraft weapons
- List of aircraft of the World War II Luftwaffe
- List of common World War II infantry weapons
- List of secondary and special issue World War II infantry weapons
- German General Staff - a post-1933 section to understand the variety of the above list.
- List of rifle cartridges
- List of handgun cartridges
- List of firearms
- Glossary of World War II German military terms
- Captured US firearms in Axis use in World War II
- German designations of foreign firearms in World War II
