= Gross Gewehr-Panzergranate =

Große Gewehr-Panzergranate
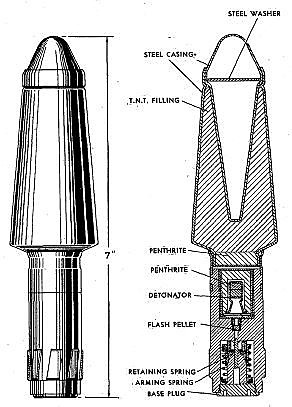
- A schematic of components.
- Type: Shaped charge rifle grenade
- Place of origin: Germany

Service history
- Used by: Wehrmacht
- Wars: World War II

Specifications
- Mass: 380 g (13.5 oz)
- Length: 180 mm (7 in)
- Diameter: 44 mm (1.75 in)
- Maximum firing range: 91 m (100 yd)
- Warhead: TNT
- Warhead weight: 130 g (4.5 oz)
- Detonation mechanism: PETN Base fuze

The Große Gewehr-Panzergranate was a shaped charge rifle grenade that was developed by Germany and used by the Wehrmacht during World War II.

== Design ==
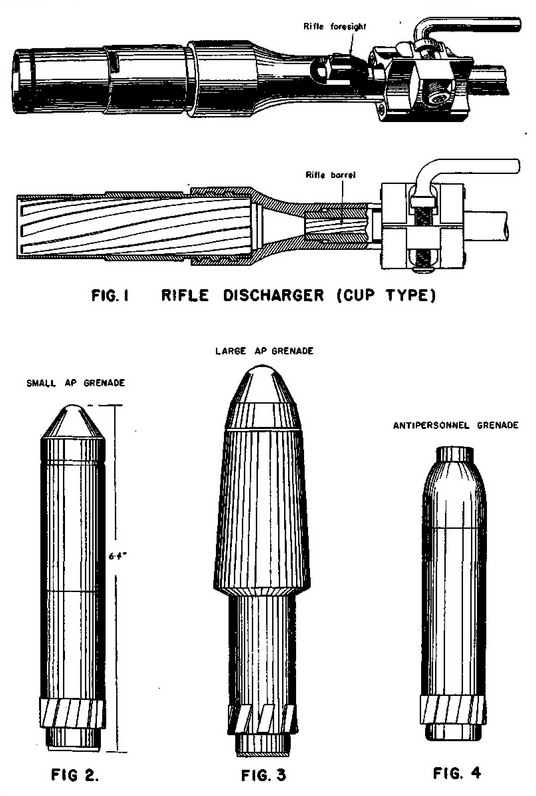
Drawings of German Schiessbecher and grenades.

The Große Gewehr-Panzergranate was launched from a Gewehrgranatengerät or Schiessbecher ("shooting cup") on a standard service rifle by a blank cartridge. The primary components were a nose cap, internal steel cone, steel upper body, aluminum lower body, rifled driving band, cast TNT filling, and a base fuze with a penthrite booster charge.

The Große Gewehr-Panzergranate was an anti-armor weapon like its predecessor the Gewehr-Panzergranate but it was larger, had better penetration, and better range. Driven by the inertia upon hitting the target, the base fuze of the Große Gewehr-Panzergranate actuated a percussion cap, which fired an instantaneous detonator seated in the compressed penthrite pellet of the gaine, which in turn transmitted the detonation through an adjacent penthrite pellet (the booster) to the main TNT filling, so collapsing the internal steel cone to create a superplastic high-velocity jet to punch through enemy armor. Since shaped charge weapons rely on chemical energy to penetrate enemy armor the low velocity of the grenade did not adversely affect penetration. A downside of the Große Gewehr-Panzergranate was its short range of 91 m (100 yd).
