= Gross Panzergranate 46 & 61 =

Grosse Panzergranate 46 & 61
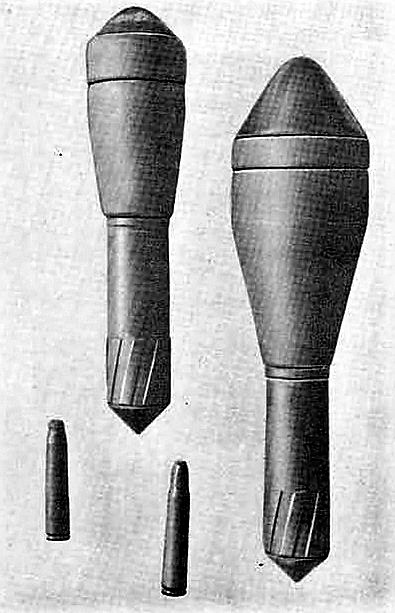
- Grosse Panzergranate 46 (left); Grosse Panzergranate 61 (right).
- Type: Shaped charge rifle grenade
- Place of origin: Germany

Service history
- Used by: Waffen-SS
- Wars: World War II

Specifications
- Mass: Pzgr 46: 410 g (14.6 oz); Pzgr 61: 580 g (1 lb 4.5 oz)
- Length: Pzgr 46: 200 mm (7.7 in); Pzgr 61: 240 mm (9.4 in)
- Diameter: Pzgr 46: 46 mm (1.8 in); Pzgr 61: 61 mm (2.4 in)
- Maximum firing range: Pzgr 46: 180 m (200 yd); Pzgr 61: 200 m (220 yd)
- Warhead: TNT
- Warhead weight: Pzgr 46: 146 g (5.16 oz); Pzgr 61: 246 g (8.69 oz)
- Detonation mechanism: Base fuze

The Grosse Panzergranate 46 & 61 were shaped charge rifle grenades that were developed by Germany and used by the Waffen-SS during World War II.

== History ==
During World War II the German armed services all competed for scarce resources and their leadership would often not cooperate with each other. The effect of this competition and non-cooperation was that each service developed its own procurement channels and often its own weapons. While some weapons were compatible others were not. Since the Waffen-SS was the military arm of the Nazi Party it was forced to develop its own procurement channels since the army's production resources were overstretched. The Waffen-SS arms design office in Brno Czechoslovakia designed the Grosse Panzergranate 46 in 1943 while the Grosse Panzergranate 61 was developed in 1944. Both were launched by a blank cartridge from the same Gewehrgranatengerät or Schiessbecher ("shooting cup") used by the army. While they were compatible with army shaped-charge rifle grenades their construction and performance were different. Developed late in the war both types were produced in small numbers.

== Design ==
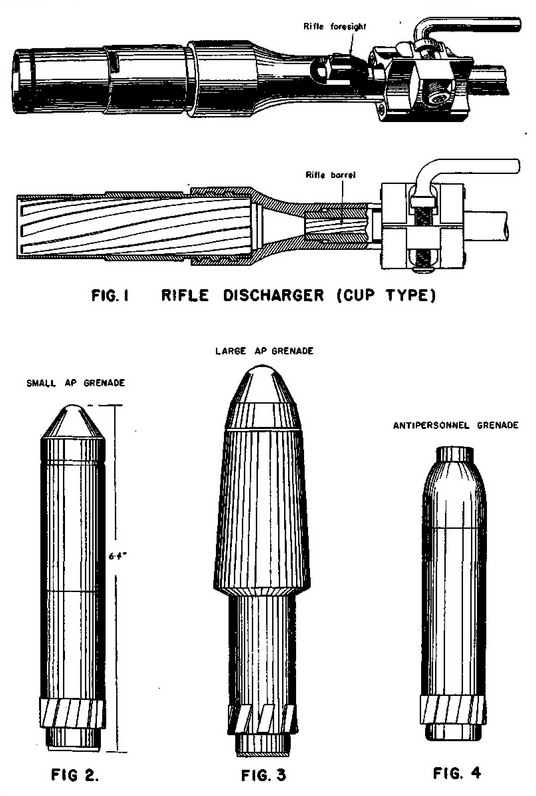
Drawings of German Schiessbecher and grenades.

The primary components of the Grosse Panzergranate 46 & 61 were a nose cap, internal steel cone, steel upper body, steel lower body, rifled driving band, TNT filling, and a base fuze. The Grosse Panzergranate 46 & 61 were anti-armor weapons like their predecessor the Gewehr-Panzergranate but were larger, had better penetration, and better range. The Grosse Panzergranate 46 & 61 upon hitting the target ignited the base fuze which in turn ignited the TNT filling which collapsed the internal steel cone to create a superplastic high-velocity jet to punch through enemy armor. In general, a longer and wider internal cone equates to increased armor penetration. Since shaped charge weapons rely on chemical energy to penetrate enemy armor the low velocity of the grenade did not adversely affect penetration. The Grosse Panzergranate 46 could penetrate 90 mm (3.54 in) while the Grosse Panzergranate 61 could penetrate 130 mm (5 in) of rolled homogeneous armor.
