= Gewehr-Granatpatrone 40 =

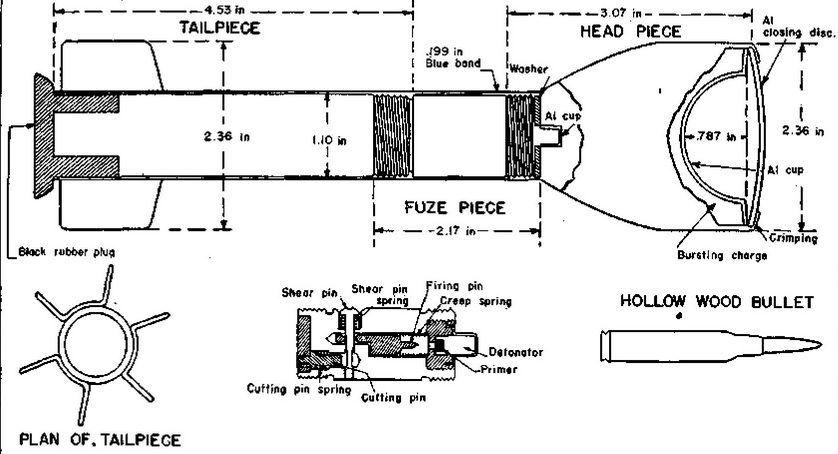
- A schematic of components.
- Type: Shaped charge rifle grenade
- Place of origin: Germany

Service history
- Used by: Luftwaffe Fallschirmjäger
- Wars: World War II

Specifications
- Mass: 515 g (18.2 oz)
- Length: 234 mm (9.2 in)
- Diameter: 61 mm (2.4 in)
- Maximum firing range: 91 m (100 yd)
- Warhead: RDX
- Warhead weight: 6.2 oz (175 g)
- Detonation mechanism: Graze fuze
- Blast yield: 35 mm (1.4 in) RHA

The Gewehr-Granatpatrone 40 or GGP/40 for short was a shaped charge rifle grenade used by German forces during the Second World War. It was originally developed for Luftwaffe Fallschirmjäger units to provide them with a light and portable anti-tank weapon.

== History ==
The GGP/40 was developed by WASAG in 1940 at the request of the Luftwaffe. It was not operational in time for the French Campaign but it is thought to have been operational in 1941 and first used by Fallschirmjäger units during the Battle of Crete. However, it soon became apparent that its aerodynamics, accuracy, range and armor penetration were all poor. In 1942 a requirement for a better projectile with 50 mm (2 in) to 70 mm (3 in) of armor penetration was drawn up but experience on the Eastern Front soon showed that even that level of performance would be insufficient so development was abandoned. The army by that time had also developed better rifle grenades.

== Design ==
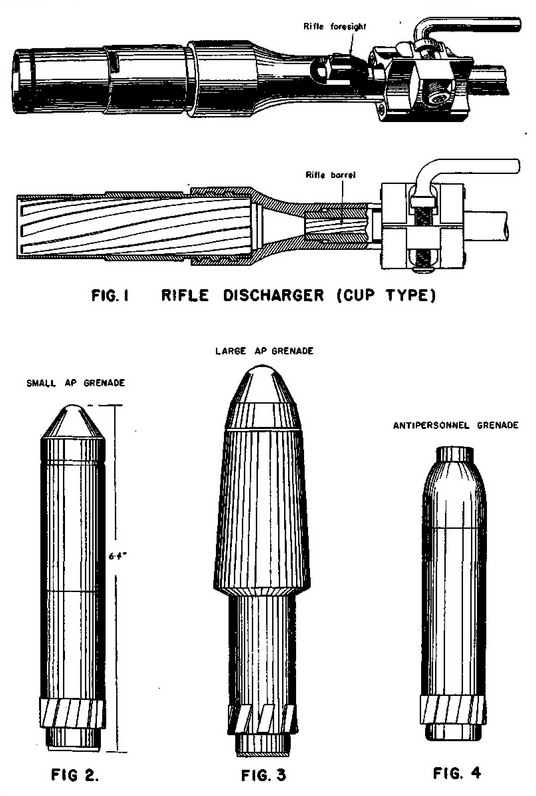
Drawings of German Schießbecher and grenades.

The GGP/40 was not fired from the same Gewehrgranatengerät or Schießbecher ("shooting cup") used by the army, instead using its own spigot type launcher. Unlike the rifle grenades used by the army the GGP/40 did not fit inside the Schießbecher but instead, it had a rubber gasket at the base and fit around the Schießbecher and was held in place by a clip. The GGP/40 was propelled by a rifle cartridge that fired a hollow wooden bullet instead of a blank cartridge. Another key difference between the GGP/40 and the army grenades was that it was fin-stabilized instead of spin-stabilized and did not have a rifled driving band. The major components of the GGP/40 were; rubber base gasket, six tail fins, hollow cylindrical base, graze fuze, bell-shaped warhead, RDX filling, internal steel cone, and convex nose cap. The GGP/40 more closely resembled a mortar round than the army's rifle grenades.

The GGP/40 upon hitting the target ignited the graze fuze which in turn ignited the RDX filling which collapsed the internal steel cone to create a superplastic high-velocity jet to punch through enemy armor. In general, a longer and wider internal cone equates to increased armor penetration. Since shaped charge weapons rely on chemical energy to penetrate enemy armor the low velocity of the grenade did not adversely affect penetration.
