= Captured US firearms in Axis use in World War II =

US firearms that were captured and redesignated by the Third Reich.

== Pistols ==
- Pistole 657(n) Ex "Kongsberg Colt" – .45 ACP
- Pistole 660(a) Ex "M1911" – .45 ACP
- Revolver 661(a) Ex "Colt M1917" – .45 ACP
- Revolver 662(a) Ex "Smith & Wesson M1917" – .45 ACP

== Submachine guns ==
- Maschinenpistole 760/2(r) Ex "Thompson Model 1928" – .45 ACP
- Maschinenpistole 761(r) Ex "Thompson Model 1921" – .45 ACP
- Maschinenpistole 762(r) Ex "M50 Reising" – .45 ACP

== Rifles ==
- Gewehr 249(a) Ex "M1903 Springfield" – .30-06 Springfield
- Gewehr 250(a) Ex "M1917 Enfield" – .30-06 Springfield
- Selbstladegewehr 251(a) Ex "M1 Garand" (Semi-automatic rifle) – .30-06 Springfield
- Selbstladegewehr 455(a) Ex "M1 carbine" – .30 Carbine

== See also ==
- List of World War II firearms of Germany
