= MG 39 Rh =

Maschinengewehr MG39 Rh
- Type: General-purpose machine gun
- Place of origin: Nazi Germany

Service history
- Wars: World War II

Production history
- Designer: Louis Stange
- Designed: 1937
- Manufacturer: Rheinmetall

Specifications
- Mass: 9.58 kg (21.1 lb)
- Length: 1,185 mm (46.7 in)
- Barrel length: 599 mm (23.6 in) (660 mm (26 in) with flash hider)
- Cartridge: 7.92×57mm Mauser
- Caliber: 7.92 mm (0.312 in)
- Barrels: 1
- Action: Gas operated
- Effective firing range: 100-1600 m in 100 m increments
- Feed system: Belt
- Sights: Iron sights

The MG39 Rh was a general-purpose machine gun of German origin.

It originated from a draft specification and contest held for an MG 34 Einheitsmaschinengewehr replacement that was better suited for mass production. Three companies were asked in February 1937 to submit new designs: Metall und Lackierwarenfabrik Johannes Großfuß AG of Döbeln, Rheinmetall-Borsig AG of Sömmerda, and Stübgen AG of Erfurt. The designs and mock-up guns proposals were submitted in October 1937. Großfuß AG's entry proved to be the best design to simplify and rationalize the technical concept of the MG 34, employing a unique recoil-operated roller locking mechanism whereas the two competing entries used a gas-actuated system.

Rheinmetall-Borsig further developed their entry under the direction of Louis Stange to the MG 39 Rh, but no records of a further development request by the German military to do this are known. The MG 39 Rh did not progress beyond the prototype stage. The only surviving example is at the Military Historical Institute of Prague in Czech Republic.

== See also ==
- List of World War II firearms of Germany
