= Propaganda-Gewehrgranate =

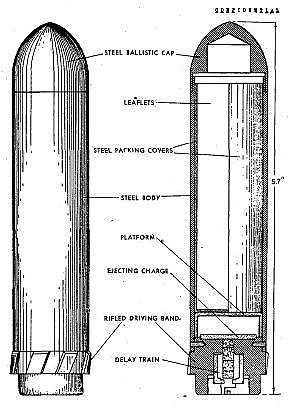
- A schematic of components.
- Type: Rifle grenade
- Place of origin: Germany

Service history
- Wars: World War II

Specifications
- Mass: 230 g (8 oz)
- Length: 140 mm (5.7 in)
- Maximum firing range: 460 m (500 yd)
- Warhead: Propaganda leaflets
- Warhead weight: 200 g (7 oz)
- Detonation mechanism: Time fuze

The Propaganda-Gewehrgranate (lit. 'Propaganda Rifle Grenade') was a non-lethal rifle grenade designed to deliver propaganda leaflets that was developed by Germany and used by the Wehrmacht during World War II.

== Design ==
The Propaganda-Gewehrgranate was launched from a "shooting cup" (Schiessbecher) on a standard service rifle by a blank cartridge and consisted of a cylindrical steel body with a rifled driving band, and a removable nose cap.

The coiled leaflets were held loosely by two steel packing covers inside the projectile's case.

On firing, the flash from the blank cartridge ignites a time fuze and after approximately 9 seconds the ejecting charge at the base of the grenade explodes, driving the ejecting platform and packing covers forward unseating the nose cap and scattering the leaflets. Maximum range was 460 m (500 yd).

== Users ==
- German Empire

== Gallery ==
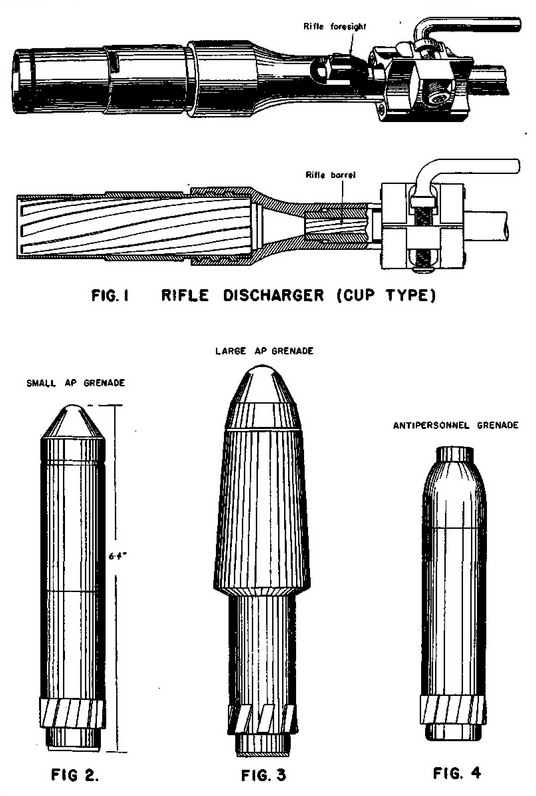
Drawings of German Schiessbecher and grenades.

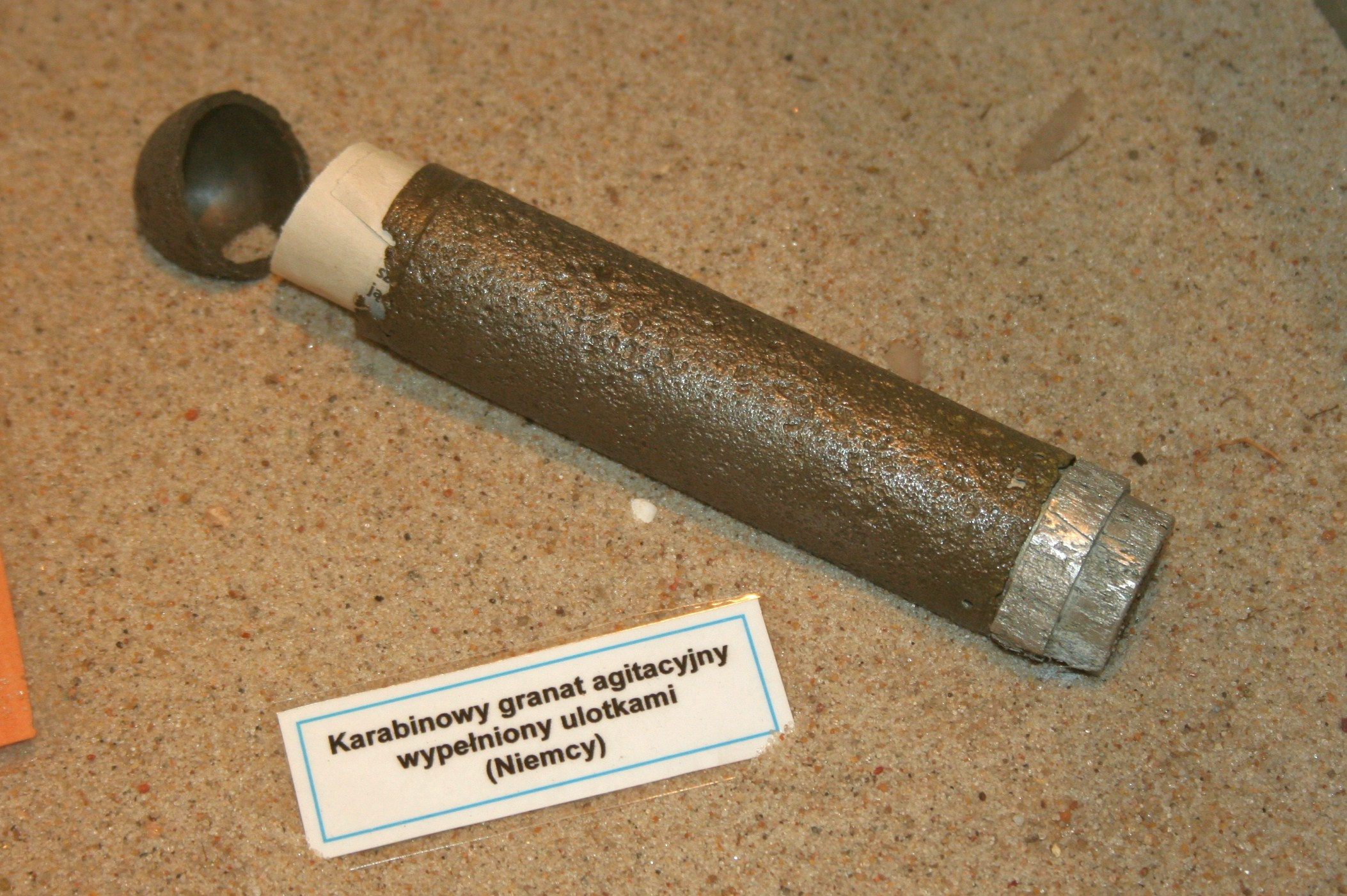
A surviving Propaganda-Gewehrgranate at the Museum of Coastal Defence at Hel, Poland.

== See also ==
- Stielhandgranate
