= Gewehr-Sprenggranate =

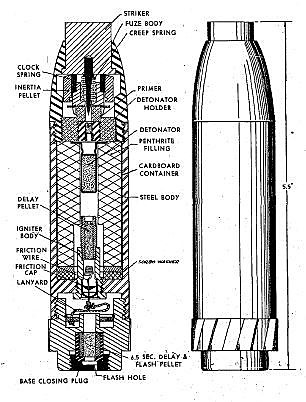
- A schematic of components.
- Type: Rifle grenade
- Place of origin: Germany

Service history
- Used by: Wehrmacht
- Wars: World War II

Specifications
- Mass: 260 g (9 oz)
- Length: 140 mm (5.5 in)
- Diameter: 30 mm (1.2 in)
- Maximum firing range: 500 m (550 yd)
- Warhead: PETN
- Warhead weight: 31 g (1.1 oz)
- Detonation mechanism: Impact Fuze; 4.5 second friction igniter 6.5 second time fuze 11 seconds total

The Gewehr-Sprenggranate was a high-explosive rifle grenade that was developed by Germany and used by the Wehrmacht during World War II.

== Design ==
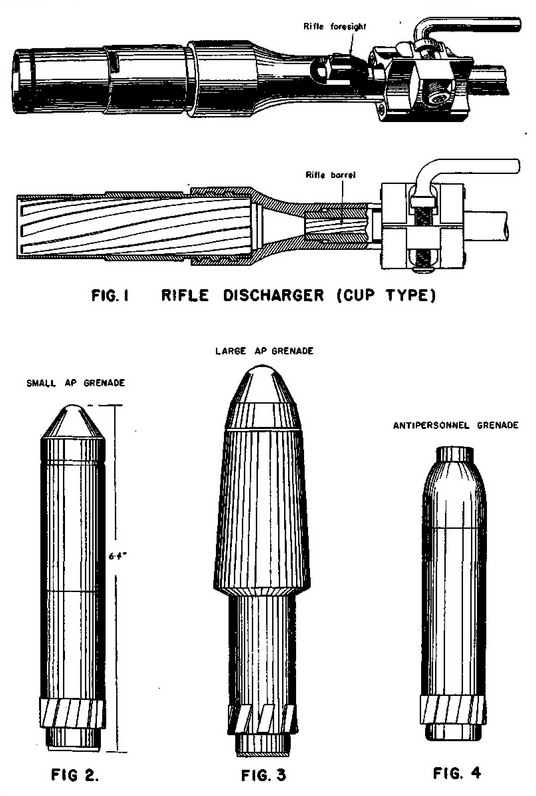
Drawings of German Schiessbecher and grenades.

The Gewehr-Sprenggranate was launched from a Gewehrgranatengerät or Schiessbecher ("shooting cup") on a standard service rifle by a blank cartridge. The Gewehr-Sprenggranate consisted of a tubular steel body filled with PETN, a rifled driving band, a nose impact fuze, a friction igniter, and a time fuze. The fuze and base assemblies are not integral parts of the grenade but are screwed into the center of the nose and base. When the rifle is fired the flash from the blank cartridge enters a hole in the base of the grenade which starts both a friction igniter and a time fuze. The grenade will then detonate on contact by the impact fuze, detonate after 4.5 seconds by the friction igniter or detonate after another 6.5 seconds by a time fuze for a total of 11 seconds. The grenade may also be used as a hand grenade by removing the base assembly and pulling a cord attached to the friction igniter.
