= Gewehr-Panzergranate =

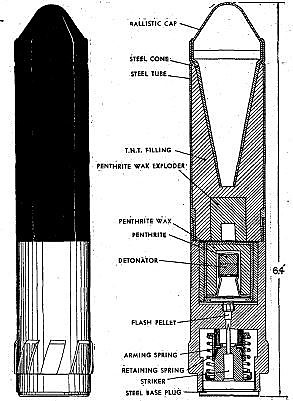
- A schematic of components.
- Type: Shaped charge rifle grenade
- Place of origin: Germany

Service history
- Used by: Wehrmacht
- Wars: World War II

Specifications
- Mass: 250 g (8.8 oz)
- Length: 160 mm (6.4 in)
- Diameter: 30.16 mm (1.1875 in)
- Muzzle velocity: 50 m/s (160 ft/s)
- Maximum firing range: 46–114 m (50–125 yd)
- Warhead: TNT
- Warhead weight: 50 g (1.75 oz)
- Detonation mechanism: PETN Base fuze
- Blast yield: 25–30 mm (0.98–1.18 in) RHA

The Gewehr-Panzergranate was a shaped charge rifle grenade that was developed by Germany and used by the Wehrmacht during World War II.

== Design ==
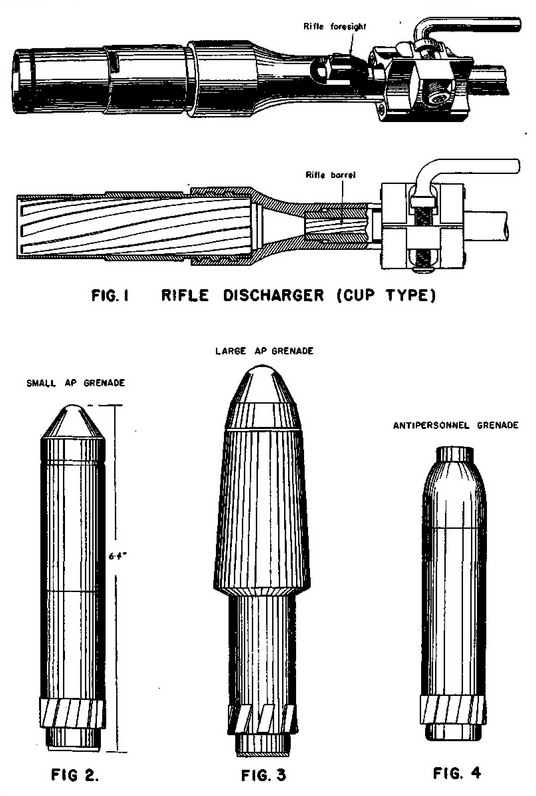
Drawings of German Schiessbecher and grenades.

The Gewehr-Panzergranate was launched from a Gewehrgranatengerät or Schiessbecher ("shooting cup") on a standard service rifle by a blank cartridge. The primary components were a nose cap, internal steel cone, steel upper body, aluminum lower body, rifled driving band, TNT filling, and a PETN base fuze.

The Gewehr-Panzergranate was an anti-armor weapon which upon hitting the target ignited the PETN base fuze which in turn ignited the TNT filling which collapsed the internal steel cone to create a superplastic high-velocity jet to punch through enemy armor. Since shaped charge weapons rely on chemical energy to penetrate enemy armor the low velocity of the grenade did not adversely affect penetration. A downside of the Gewehr-Panzergranate was its short range 46–114 m (50–125 yd).
