= Artillery fuze =

Type of munition fuze used with artillery munitions

An artillery fuze or fuse is the type of munition fuze used with artillery munitions, typically projectiles fired by guns (field, anti-aircraft, coast and naval), howitzers and mortars. A fuze is a device that initiates an explosive function in a munition, most commonly causing it to detonate or release its contents, when its activation conditions are met. This action typically occurs a preset time after firing (time fuze), or on physical contact with (contact fuze) or detected proximity to the ground, a structure or other target (proximity fuze). Fuze, a variant of fuse, is the official NATO spelling.

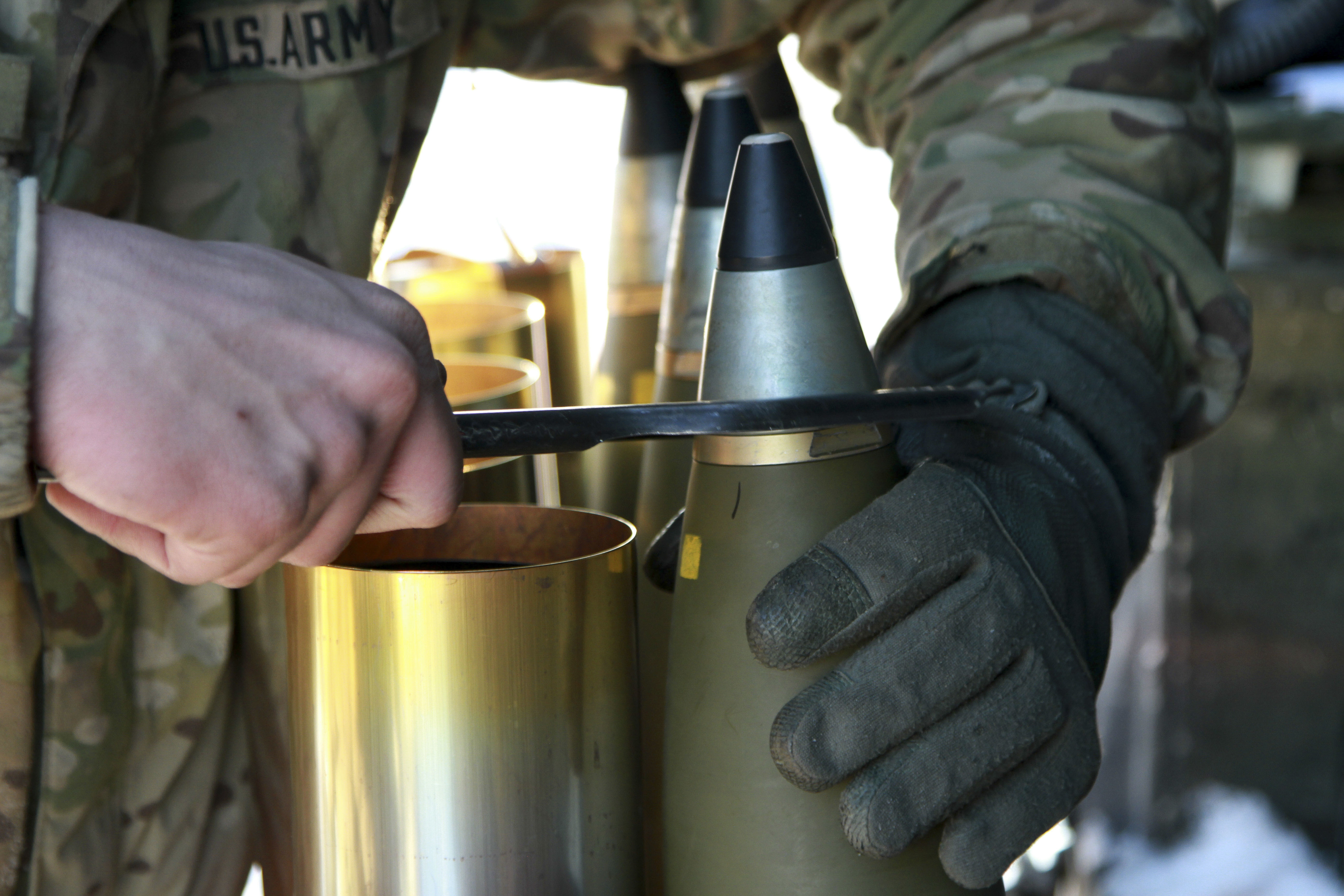
Tightening of the fuse on a 105 mm howitzer round

== Terminology ==
Munitions fuzes are also used with rockets, aircraft bombs, guided missiles, grenades and mines, and some direct fire cannon munitions (small calibre and tank guns).

Broadly, fuzes function on impact (percussion fuzes) or at a pre-determined time period after firing (time fuzes). However, by the 18th century time fuzes were aimed to function in the air and in the 1940s proximity fuzes were introduced to achieve a more precisely positioned airburst. Therefore, the terms 'percussion' and 'airburst' are generally used here unless 'time' fuzes are being explicitly described.

== Early history ==
Solid cannonballs ("shot") did not need a fuze, but hollow balls ("shells") filled with something such as gunpowder to fragment the ball needed a time fuze. Early reports of shells include Venetian use at Jadra in 1376 and shells with fuzes at the 1421 siege of St Boniface in Corsica. In 1596 Sebastian Halle proposed both igniting the bursting charge by percussion and regulating the burning time of fuzes, but this was considered visionary at the time. These early time fuzes used a combustible material that burnt for a time before igniting the shell filling (slow match). The problem was that precise burning times required precise time measurement and recording, which did not appear until 1672. Before this the proofmaster often tested the burning time of powder by reciting the Apostles' Creed for time measurement.

It was not until around the middle of the 18th century that it was realised that the windage between ball and barrel allowed the flash from the propelling charge to pass around the shell. This led, in 1747, to 'single-fire' and eliminated the need to light the fuze before loading the shell. At this time fuzes were made of beech wood, bored out and filled with powder and cut to the required length. Experience taught that there was a minimum safe length. In 1779 the British adopted pre-cut fuze lengths giving 4, 4.5 and 5 seconds.

The first account of a percussion fuze appears in 1650, using a flint to create sparks to ignite the powder. The problem was that the shell had to fall a particular way and with spherical shells this could not be guaranteed. The term 'blind' for an unexploded shell resulted. The problem was finding a suitably stable 'percussion powder'. Progress was not possible until the discovery of mercury fulminate in 1800, leading to priming mixtures for small arms patented by the Rev Alexander Forsyth, and the copper percussion cap in 1818. The concept of percussion fuzes was adopted by Britain in 1842. Many designs were jointly examined by the army and navy, but were unsatisfactory, probably because of the safety and arming features. However, in 1846 the design by Quartermaster Freeburn of the Royal Artillery was adopted by the army. It was a wooden fuze some 6 inches long and used shear wire to hold blocks between the fuze magazine and a burning match. The match was ignited by propellant flash and the shear wire broke on impact. A British naval percussion fuze made of metal did not appear until 1861.

There was little standardisation. Well into the 19th century, in British service, virtually every calibre had its own time fuze. For example, seven different fuses were used with spherical cased shot until 1850. However, in 1829 metal fuzes were adopted by the Royal Navy instead of wooden ones. At this time fuzes were used with shrapnel, common shell (filled with explosive) and grenades. All British fuzes were prepared by cutting to length or boring into the bottom from below. The problem was that this left the powder unsupported and fuze failures were common.

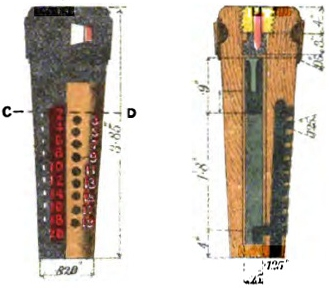
British 'Boxer' wooden time fuze, 1870s, burned for maximum 9 seconds, adjusted by punching through applicable hole

British inventor Colonel Edward Boxer of the Royal Artillery suggested a better way: wooden fuze cones with a central powder channel and holes drilled every 2/10th of an inch. In 1853 these were combined into a single fuze with dual channels, 2 inches long for howitzers and common shell, 1 inch for shrapnel. The holes were sealed with clay, with could be spiked through before loading to select the necessary time delay. There were white and black painted groups of holes for odd and even tenths. The Boxer time fuze used a fuze hole size different to that of Freeburn's percussion fuze, which became obsolete. Freeman's were replaced in army service in 1861 by those designed by Pettman, which could be used with both spherical and non-spherical shells.

The final Boxer time fuze, for mortars, appeared in 1867 and the army retained wooden fuzes although the navy used metal ones. There was a similar American wooden fuze. However, in 1855 Armstrong produced his rifled breech loading (RBL) gun, which was introduced into British service in 1859. The problem was that there was little or no windage between the shell and the barrel, so the propelling charge could no longer be used to ignite the fuze. Therefore, a primer was added with a hammer suspended above it, such that the shock of firing released the hammer, which initiated the primer to ignite the powder time-train. Armstrong's 'A' pattern time fuze was introduced to British service in 1860, while the shorter Borman fuze was used in the United States.

The introduction of rifled breech loader guns led to non-spherical projectiles, which landed nose first. This enabled percussion nose fuzes, but they had to cope with the spinning shell and centrifugal forces. This led, by about 1860, to percussion fuzes with a direct action firing pin and detonator and a magazine to boost the detonators sufficiently to initiate the shell's main charge.

Armstrong's time fuze designs evolved rapidly. In 1867 the F pattern was introduced; this was the first 'time and percussion' (T&P) fuze. Its percussion function was not entirely successful and was soon replaced by the E Mk III fuze. Made of brass, it contained a ring of slow burning composition ignited by a pellet holding a detonator cap that was set back onto a firing pin by the shock of firing. It was the prototype of the T&P fuzes used in the 20th century, although initially it was used only with naval segment shells, and it took some time for the army to adopt it for shrapnel.

== Description ==
Since the second half of the 19th century, most artillery fuzes have been fitted to the nose of the projectile. The base of the fuze is screwed into a recess, and its nose is designed to conform to the shape of the shell's ogive. The depth of recess can vary with the type of shell and fuze. Artillery fuzes were sometimes specific to particular types of gun or howitzer due to their characteristics, notable differences in muzzle velocity and hence the sensitivity of safety and arming mechanisms. However, by World War 2, while there were exceptions. Most fuzes of one nation could be used with any artillery shell of that nation if it could be physically fitted to it, although different army and navy procurement arrangements often prevented this. The exceptions were mortar bomb fuzes, and this continues.

An early action in NATO standardisation was to agree the dimensions and threads of the fuze recess in artillery projectiles to enable fuze interchangeability between nations. Modern artillery fuzes can generally be used with any appropriate artillery shell, including naval ones. However, smoothbore mortars constrain the choice of safety and arming mechanisms because there is no centrifugal force and muzzle velocities are relatively low. Therefore, shell fuzes cannot be used with mortar bombs, and mortar fuzes are unsuitable for the higher velocities of shells.

The fuze action is initiated by impact, elapsed time after firing or proximity to a target. In most cases the fuze action causes detonation of the main high explosive charge in a shell or a small charge to eject a carrier shell's contents. These contents may be lethal, such as the now-obsolete shrapnel shell or modern sub-munitions, or non-lethal such as canisters containing a smoke compound or a parachute flare.

Fuzes normally have two explosive components in their explosive train: a very small detonator (or primer) struck by a firing pin, and a booster charge at the base of the fuze (sometimes called the 'magazine'). This booster is powerful enough to detonate the main charge in a high-explosive shell or the ejecting charge in a carrier shell. The two charges are typically connected by a 'flash tube'.

The safety and arming arrangements in artillery fuzes are critical features to prevent the fuze functioning until required, no matter how harsh its transport and handling. These arrangements use the forces created by the gun or howitzer firing – high acceleration (or 'shock of firing') and rotation (caused by the rifling in the gun or howitzer barrel) – to release the safety features and arm the fuze. Some older types of fuze also had safety features such as pins or caps removed by the user before loading the shell into the breech. Defective fuzes can function while the shell is in the barrel – a 'bore premature', or further along the trajectory.

Different fuze designs have different safety and arming mechanisms that use the two forces in various ways. The earliest 'modern' fuzes used wire sheared by the shock of firing. Subsequently, centripetal devices were generally preferred for use with low-velocity howitzer shells because the set-back was often insufficient. However, late 19th- and 20th-century designs used more sophisticated combinations of methods that applied the two forces. Examples include:

- Centripetal force moving a bolt outwards, which allows another bolt to move backwards by inertia from acceleration.
- Inertia from acceleration overcoming the pressure of a retaining spring to release a catch that allows an arm, plate, segmented sleeve or other bolt to move outwards either by centrifugal force, or spring in the case of mortars (which do not generate centrifugal force, being smooth bored).
- Centripetal force causing a plate holding a detonator to swing into alignment with a firing pin.
- Centripetal force causing a barrier plate(s) or block(s) to overcome a spring(s) and swing out of the channel between the firing pin and detonator or between the detonator and the booster (or both).
- Rotation causing a weighted tape to unwind from around a spindle and free the firing pin hammer.

Modern safety and arming devices are part of an overall fuze design that meets insensitive munitions requirements. This includes careful selection of the explosives used throughout the explosive train, strong physical barriers between the detonator and booster until the shell is fired and positioning explosive components for maximum protection in the fuze.

== Types ==
=== Percussion ===
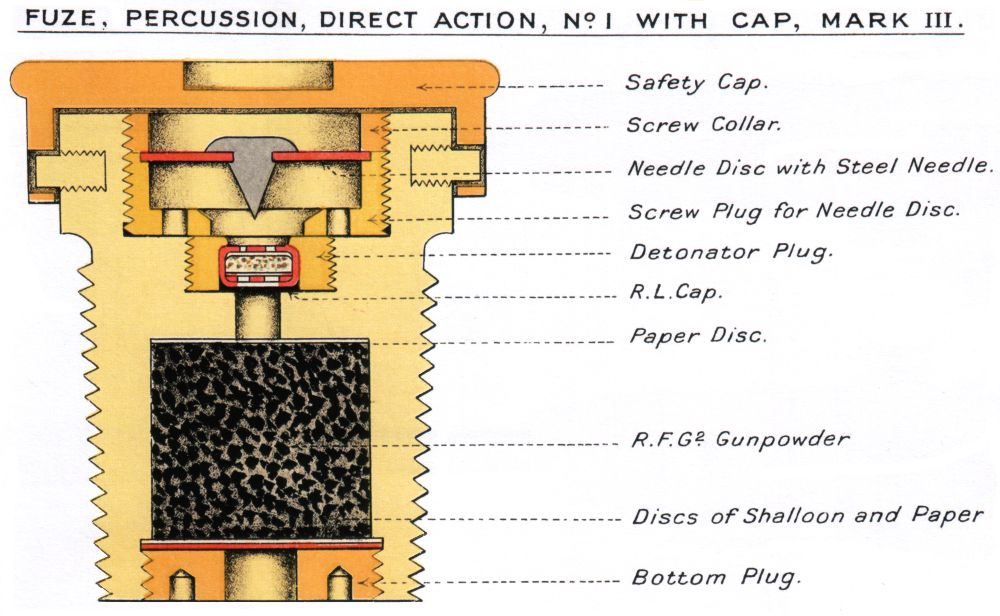
Early British "direct action" nose impact fuze of 1900 with no safety or arming mechanism, relying on heavy direct physical impact to detonate

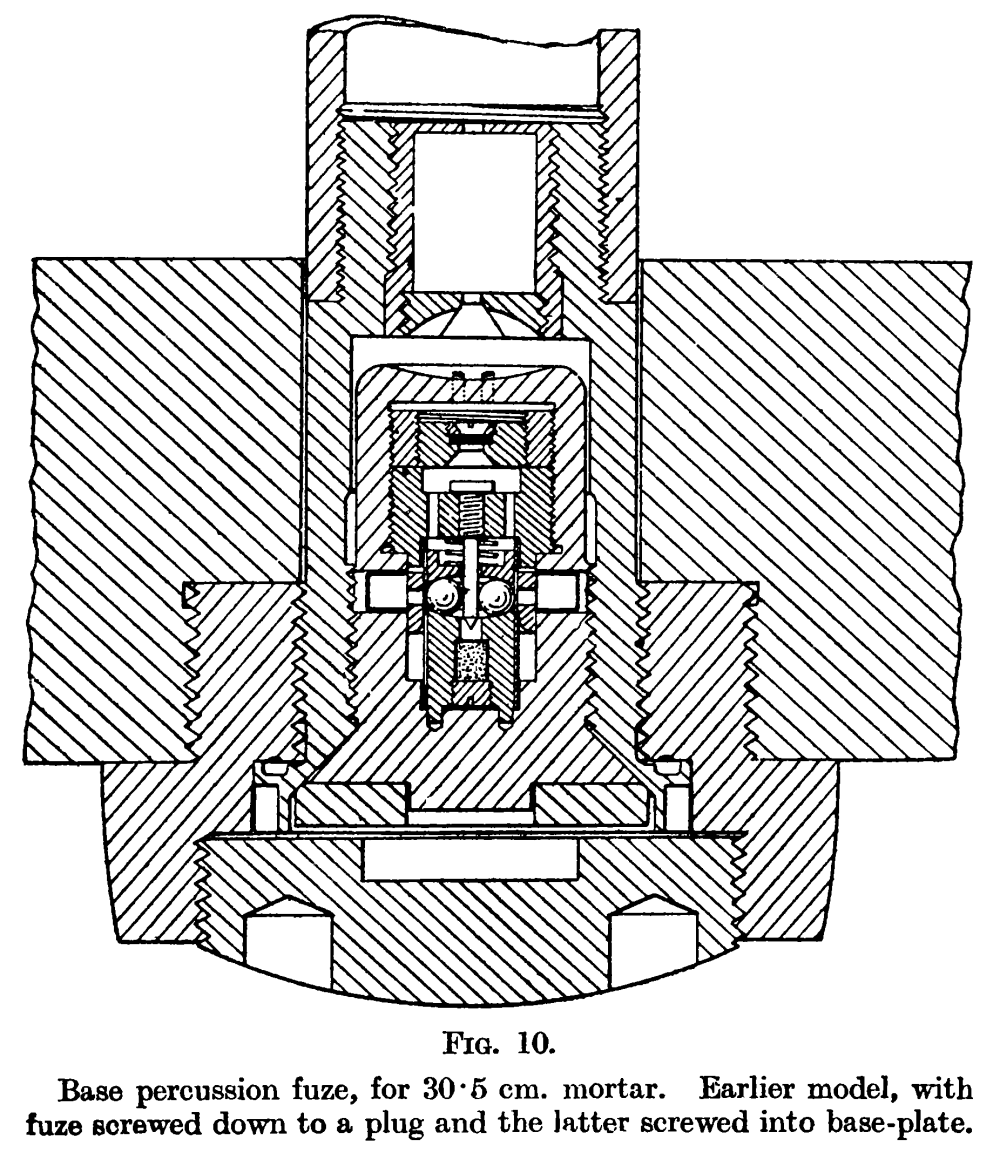
Base-detonating fuze for Austrian 30.5 cm howitzer, as used in defeating the Belgian forts at Liège in 1914

German 7,5 cm Pzgr. 1939 : an armour-piercing shell with base detonating fuze (1), as fired by Panzer IV and Pak 40 anti-tank gun

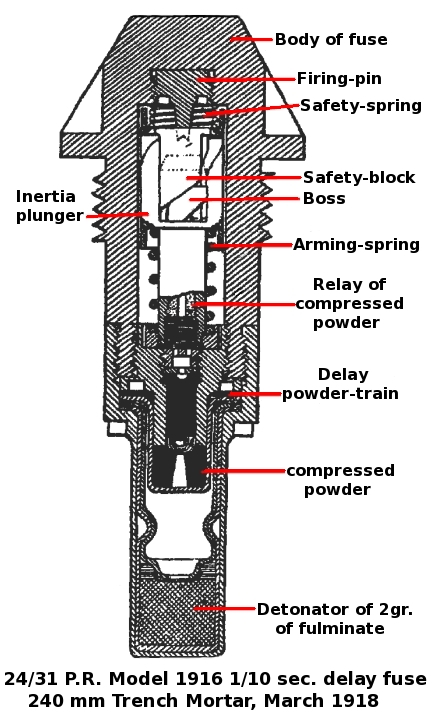
French point-detonating fuze of 1916 with inertia plunger and 1/10-second delay, used with heavy trench mortar bombs

In the 20th century, most fuzes were 'percussion'. They may be 'direct action' (also called 'point detonating' or 'super quick') or 'graze'. They may also offer a 'delay' option. Percussion fuzes remain widespread particularly for training. However, in the 19th century combined 'T&P' fuzes became common and this combination remain widespread with airburst fuzes in case the airburst function failed or was set too 'long'. War stocks in western armies are now predominantly 'multi-function' offering a choice of several ground and airburst functions.

==== Direct action ====
Direct action fuzes function by the fuze nose hitting something reasonably solid, such as the ground, a building or a vehicle, and pushing a firing pin into a detonator. The early British fuze at left is an example.

Direct action fuze designs are 'super-quick' but may have a delay option. 20th-century designs vary in the relative positions of their key elements. For example, the firing pin and detonator may be close to the nose with a long flash tube to the booster (typical in US designs), or there might instead be a long firing pin to a detonator close to the booster and a short flash tube (typical in British designs).

==== Graze ====
Graze fuzes function when the shell is suddenly slowed down, e.g. by hitting the ground or going through a wall. This deceleration causes the firing pin to move forward or the detonator to move backward so that one strikes the other. Graze is the only percussion mechanism that can be used in base fuzes. Such a fuze is usually an inertially fired fuze (such as a base fuze mentioned above) that has special features to increase the chance of the fuze functioning if it hits the target at a highly oblique angle that can frequently jam or "blind" such fuzes due to the high sideways forces generated. For example, the later WWII German Navy armor-piercing projectile base fuzes ("Bodenzünder") had such fuzes of several kinds, with the weighted firing pin and the explosive detonator pellet both free to move, held apart only by friction or a light spring, after arming in flight by removing a series of rotating shutters locking them in place before firing the projectile. Thus, on a highly oblique – "glancing" or "grazing" – impact, there was a higher chance that at least one of them would be free to move toward the other and be thrown toward the other during the target impact with enough force to explode the detonator and start the shell explosive train. There are other design variations for this effect.

==== Delay ====
Direct action fuzes can have a delay function, selected at the gun as an alternative to direct action. Delay may use a graze function or some other mechanism. Special 'concrete piercing' fuzes usually have only a delay function and a hardened and strengthened fuze nose.

==== Base ====
Base fuzes are enclosed within the base of the shell and thus are not damaged by the initial impact with the target. Their delay timing may be adjustable before firing. They use graze action and have not been widely used with field artillery. Base fuzed shells were used by coast artillery and warships against armoured warships into the 1950s. They have also had some use against tanks, some such shells having High Explosive Squash Head (HESH) features, also called High Explosive Plastic (HEP), which were used after World War II by 105mm artillery for self-defence by and against tanks.

=== Airburst ===
Airburst fuzes, using a preset timing device initiated by the gun firing, were the earliest type of fuze. They were particularly important in the 19th and early 20th centuries when shrapnel fuzes were widely used. They again became important when cluster munitions became a major element in Cold War ammunition stocks. The use of multi-function fuzes in the late 20th century meant that in some western countries airburst fuzes became available for every shell.

Time fuzes were essential for larger calibre anti-aircraft guns, and it soon became clear that igniferous fuzes were insufficiently accurate. This drove the development of mechanical time fuzes between the world wars. During World War 2 radio proximity fuzes were introduced, initially for use against aircraft, where they proved far superior to mechanical time, and at the end of 1944 for field artillery.

==== Time ====
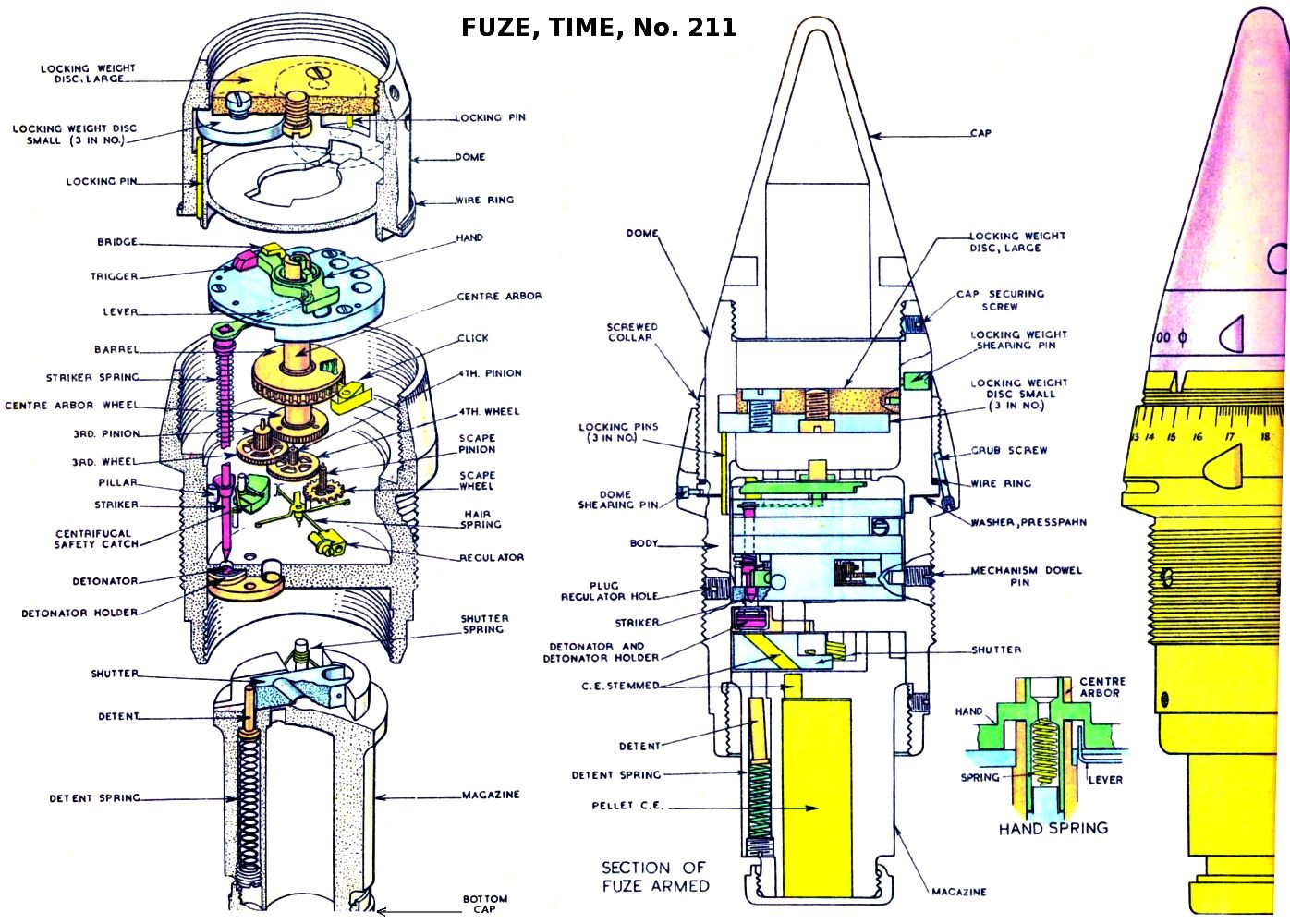
A British clockwork Time fuze for an artillery shell using the Thiel mechanism, circa 1936

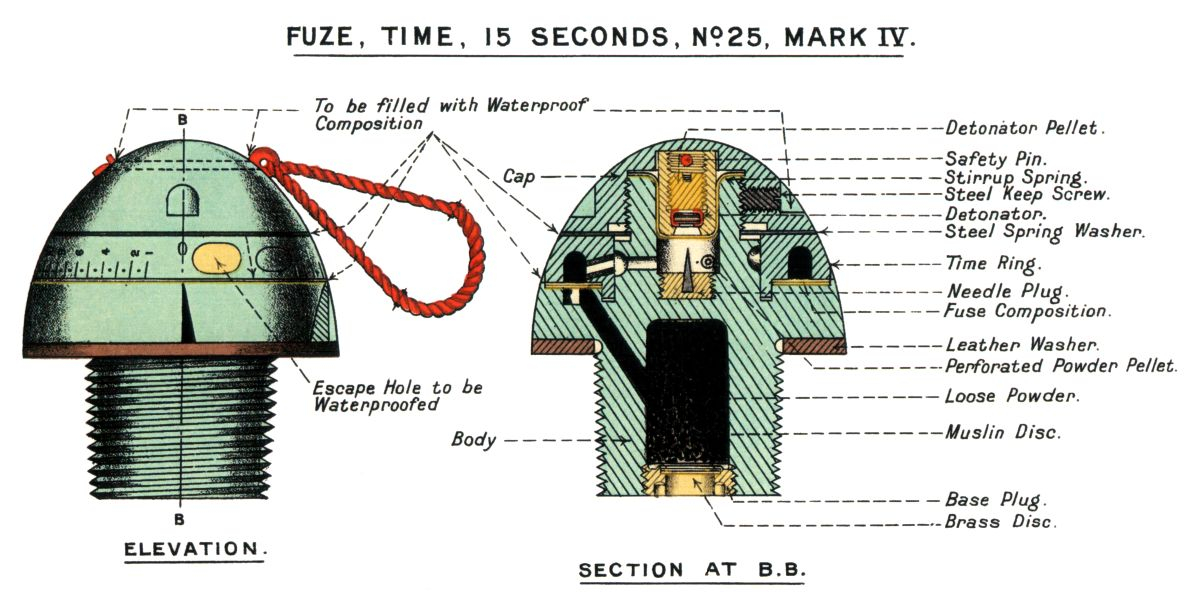
British aluminium No. 25 Mk IV time fuze, using a burning gunpowder timer, circa 1914, used for star shells

Artillery Time fuzes detonate after a set period of time. Early time fuzes were igniferous (i.e. combustible) using a powder train. Clockwork mechanisms appeared at the beginning of the 20th century and electronic time fuzes appeared in the 1980s, soon after digital watches.

Almost all artillery time fuzes are fitted to the nose of the shell. One exception was the 1950s design US 203 mm (8 in) nuclear shell (M422) that had a triple-deck mechanical time base fuze.

The time delay of a time fuze is usually calculated as part of the technical fire control calculations, and not done at the gun although armies have differed in their arrangements. The fuze delay primarily reflects the range to the target and the required height of burst. High height of burst, typically a few hundred metres, is usually used with star shell (illuminating shell) and other base ejecting shells such as smoke and cluster munitions, and for observing with high-explosive (HE) shells in some circumstances. Low airburst fuzes, typically about 10 metres (30 ft), were used with HE shells. The height of burst with shrapnel depended on the angle of descent, but for optimal use it was a few tens of metres.

Igniferous time fuzes had a powder ring in an inverted 'U' metal channel, the fuze being set by rotating the upper part of the fuze. When the shell was fired the shock of firing set back a detonator onto a firing pin, which ignited the powder ring; when the burn reached the fuze setting, it flashed through a hole into the fuze magazine, which then ignited the bursting charge in the shell. If the shell contained HE then the fuze had a gaine that converted the powder explosion into a detonation powerful enough to detonate the HE.

The problem with igniferous fuzes was that, though good enough for flat trajectory shrapnel (ranges were relatively short by later standards) or high bursting carrier shells, they were imprecise and erratic. While improvements in powder composition helped, several complex factors still prevented the desired regularity in the field. Britain in particular encountered great difficulty in achieving consistency early in World War I (1914 and 1915) with its then-obsolescent gunpowder-train time fuzes for anti-aircraft fire against targets at altitudes up to 6,000 metres (20,000 ft). It was then discovered that standard gunpowder burned differently at differing altitudes, a problem rectified to some extent by specially designed fuzes with modified gunpowder formulations. Britain finally switched to mechanical (i.e. clockwork) time fuzes just after World War I, which solved this problem. Residual stocks of igniferous fuzes lasted for many years after World War 2 with smoke and illuminating shells.

Before World War I Krupp, in Germany, started producing the Baker clockwork fuze. It contained a spring clock with an extra-rapid cylinder escapement giving 30 beats per second. During World War 1 Germany developed other mechanical time (i.e. clockwork) fuzes. These were less erratic and more precise than igniferous fuzes, critical characteristics as gun ranges increased. Between the wars five or six different mechanisms were developed in various nations. However, three came to predominate, the Thiel pattern in British designs, Junghans pattern in American designs and the Swiss Dixi mechanisms, the first two having originated in World War 1 Germany. Mechanical time fuzes remain in service with many armies.

Mechanical time fuzes were good enough for field artillery to achieve the effective HE height of burst of about 10 metres above the ground. However, 'good enough' usually meant '4 in the air and 2 on the ground'. This fuze length was extremely difficult to predict, so the height of burst almost always had to be adjusted by observation.

==== Proximity ====
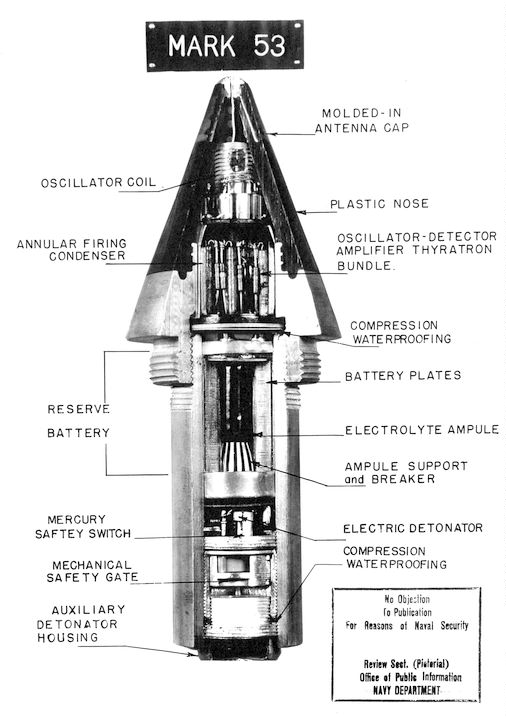
Mk 53 Proximity fuze for an artillery shell, circa 1945

The benefits of a fuze that functioned when it detected a target in proximity are obvious, particularly for use against aircraft. The first such fuze seems to have been developed by the British in the 1930s for use with their anti-aircraft 'unrotated projectiles' – rockets. These used a photo-electric fuze.

During 1940–42 a private venture initiative by Pye Ltd, a leading British wireless manufacturer, worked on the development of a radio proximity fuze. Pye's research was transferred to the United States as part of the technology package delivered by the Tizard Mission when the United States entered the war. These fuzes emitted radio waves and sensed their reflection from the target (aircraft or ground). The strength of the reflected signal indicated the distance to the target. When this was correct the fuze detonated.

For the first 18 months or so proximity fuzes were restricted to anti-aircraft use to ensure that none was retrieved by the enemy and copied. They were also called 'variable time' or VT to obscure their nature. They were finally released for field artillery use in December 1944 in Europe. While they were not perfect and bursts could still be erratic due to rain, they were a vast improvement on mechanical time in delivering a very high proportion of bursts at the required 10 metre height. However, VT fuzes went far deeper into the shell than other fuzes because they had a battery that was activated by the shock of firing. This meant the fuze recess had to be deeper, so to enable shorter non-VT fuzes the deep recess was filled with removable supplementary HE canisters.

After the war the next generation of proximity fuze included a mechanical timer to switch on the fuze a few seconds before it was due at the target. These were called 'Controlled Variable Time' (CVT) and reduced the incidence of early bursts. Later models had additional electronic countermeasures.

==== Distance measuring ====
The mechanical distance fuze has had little use; Thompson's pattern was tested by the British but did not enter service. The fuzes operated by counting revolutions. It has the advantage of inherent safety and not requiring any internal driving force but depended on muzzle velocity and rifling pitch. These are allowed for when calculating the fuze setting. Early 20th-century versions were sometimes called 'flag fuzes', so named due to the vane protruding from the nose of the fuze.

==== Electronic timer ====
In the late 1970s and early '80s electronic time fuzes started replacing earlier types. These were based on the use of oscillating crystals that had been adopted for digital watches. Like watches, advances in electronics made them much cheaper than mechanical devices. The introduction of these fuzes coincided with the widespread adoption of cluster munitions in some NATO countries.

=== Multi function ===
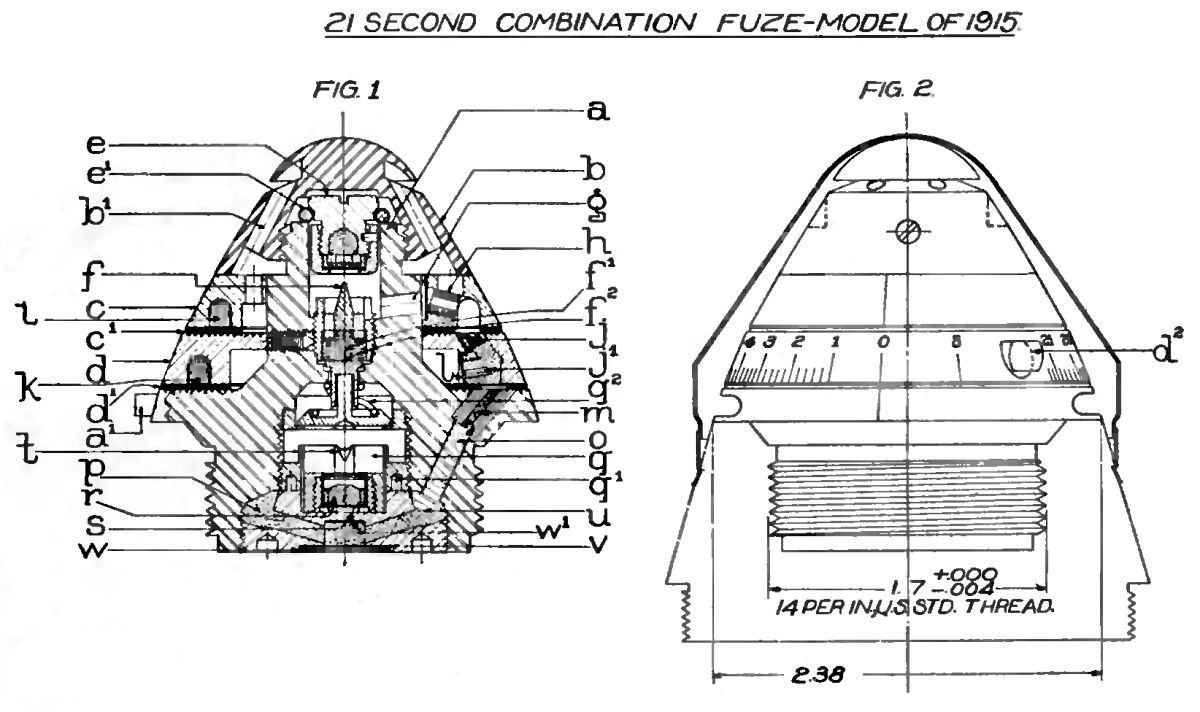
US point detonating fuze of 1915 combining adjustable timer up to 21 seconds, using a gunpowder train, and impact mode

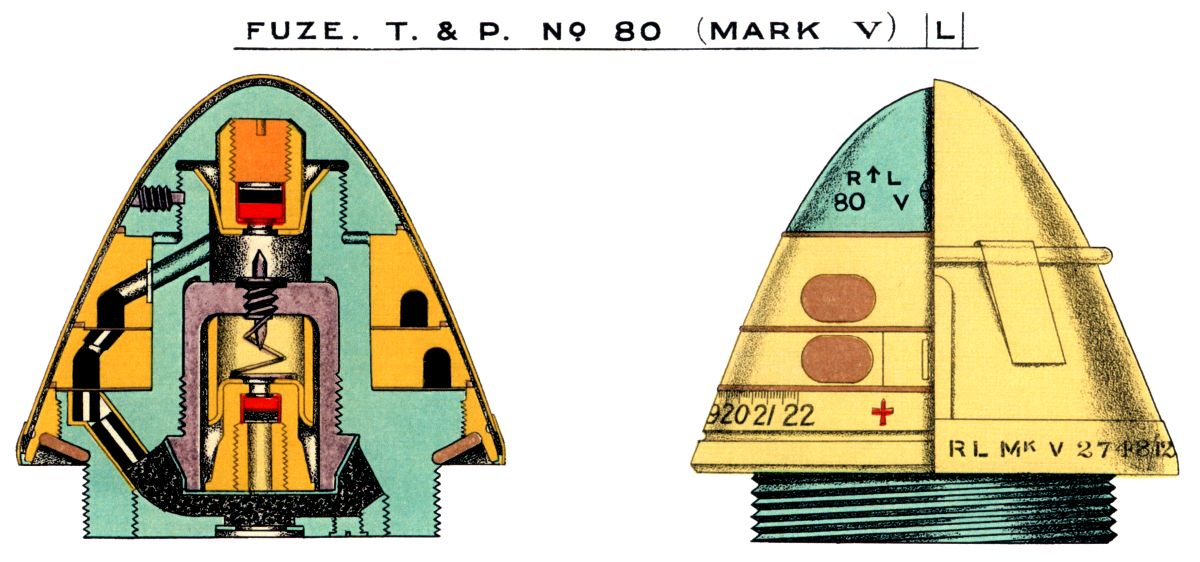
No. 80 "Time & Percussion" fuze licensed from Krupp was Britain's main WWI shrapnel fuze. This igniferous fuze was set to lengths up to 22 time units before detonating and was also detonated by inertia on impact if that occurred before expiration of the timer. After World War I Britain had to pay Krupp large backdated licensing fees for its wartime use, mostly against Germany

A fuze assembly may include more than one fuze function. A typical combination would be a T&P ("Time & Percussion") fuze with the fuze set to detonate on impact or expiration of a preset time, whichever occurred first. Such fuzes were introduced around the middle of the 19th century. This combination may function as a safety measure or as an expedient to ensure that the shell will be actuated no matter what happens and hence not be wasted. The United States called mechanical T&P fuzes 'mechanical time super quick' (MTSQ). T&P fuzes were normal with shrapnel and HE shells (including proximity fuzes), but were not always used with high bursting carrier shells.

However, in the early 1980s electronic fuzes with several functions and options started appearing. Initially they were little more than enhanced versions of proximity fuzes, typically offering a choice of proximity heights or impact options. A choice of burst heights could also be used to get optimum burst heights in terrain with different reflectivity. However, they were cheaper than older proximity fuzes and the cost of adding electronic functions was marginal, so they were more widely issued. In some countries all their war stock HE was fitted with them, instead of only 5% to 10% with proximity fuzes.

The most modern multi-option artillery fuzes offer a comprehensive choice of functions. For example, Junghans DM84U provides delay, super quick, time (up to 199 seconds), two proximity heights of burst and five depths of foliage penetration.

=== Sensor ===
Sensor fuzes can be considered smart proximity fuzes. Initial developments were the United States 'Seek and Destroy Armour' (SADARM) in the 1980s using sub-munitions ejected from a 203 mm (8.0 in) carrier shell. Later European developments, BONUS and SMArt 155, are 155 mm (6.1 in) calibre due to advances in electronics. These sensor fuzes typically use millimetric radar to recognise a tank, aim the sub-munition at it, and fire an explosively formed penetrator from above.

=== Course correcting ===
The main fuze developments in the early 21st century are near-precision course-correcting fuzes (CCF), replacing the standard multi-option nose fuze with a package adding GPS-guided trajectory correction. The cost is much lower than true precision-guided artillery munitions, making them suitable for widespread use. An example is the M1156 precision guidance kit, which improves the accuracy of 155 mm (6.1 in) shells fivefold at maximum range (50 m (160 ft) CEP vs 267 m (876 ft) CEP).

== Settings ==
Many fuzes have to be set before being loaded into the breech, though for impact fuzes it may be a simple matter of selecting the delay option if required, 'instantaneous' being the factory-set default. However, airburst fuzes must have the required fuze length set. Modern fuzes invariably use a fuze length in seconds (with at least tenths) that reflect the required time of flight. However, some earlier time fuzes used arbitrary units of time.

The fuze length reflects the range between the gun and its target. Before computers became available, this range was manually calculated in the command post or fire direction center. Some armies converted the range to an elevation and fuze length and ordered it to the guns. Others set the range on the sights, and each gun had a fuze indicator that converted the range to a fuze length (with allowance for muzzle velocity and local conditions). In World War I German fuzes were graduated with ranges in metres.

With digital computers fuze lengths are usually computed in the command post or fire direction center, unless the gun itself does the full ballistic calculation.

Naval and anti-aircraft artillery started using analogue computers before World War 2, connected to the guns to automatically aim them. They also had automatic fuze setters. This was particularly important for anti-aircraft guns that were aiming ahead of their target and so needed a regular, predictable rate of fire.

Field artillery used manual time fuze setting. At its simplest this uses a hand ‘key’ or wrench to turn the fuze nose to the required setting. Manual fuze setters are set at the fuze length and then used to set the fuze. This has the advantage of ensuring that every fuze is correctly and identically set. Electronic fuzes are designed use electronic setters to transfer data electronically. Early ones required an electrical contact between the fuze and the setter. These have been superseded by induction fuze setters that do not require physical contact with the fuze. Electronic setters may also check fuze functioning in a 'Go/No Go' test.

== Packaging ==
Fuzes may be delivered fitted to shells or in separate containers. In the latter case the shell itself has a plug that has to be removed before fitting the fuze. Historically, fuzed HE shells were provided with a standard impact fuze that had to be removed and replaced by a time fuze when airburst was required.

Whether shells are delivered fuzed depends on whether or not the shells are in sealed packaging. Historically smaller calibres, e.g. 105 mm (4.1 in) and less, usually were sealed, while larger calibre shells were not. However, in many armies it is now normal for 155 mm (6.1 in) shells to be delivered in sealed packaging with fuzes fitted.

== Image gallery ==
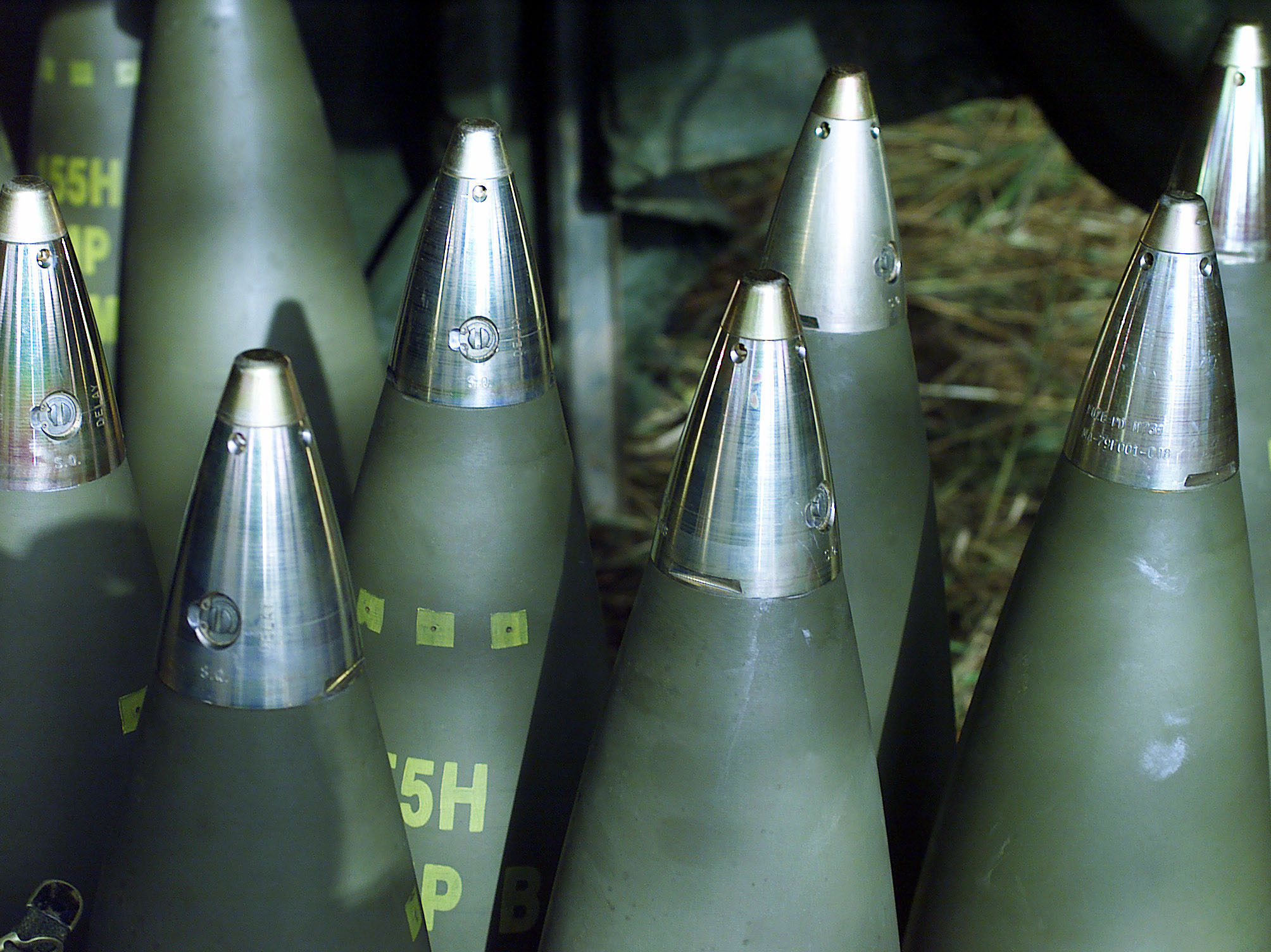
Fuzes fitted to M107 155 mm artillery shells, circa 2000

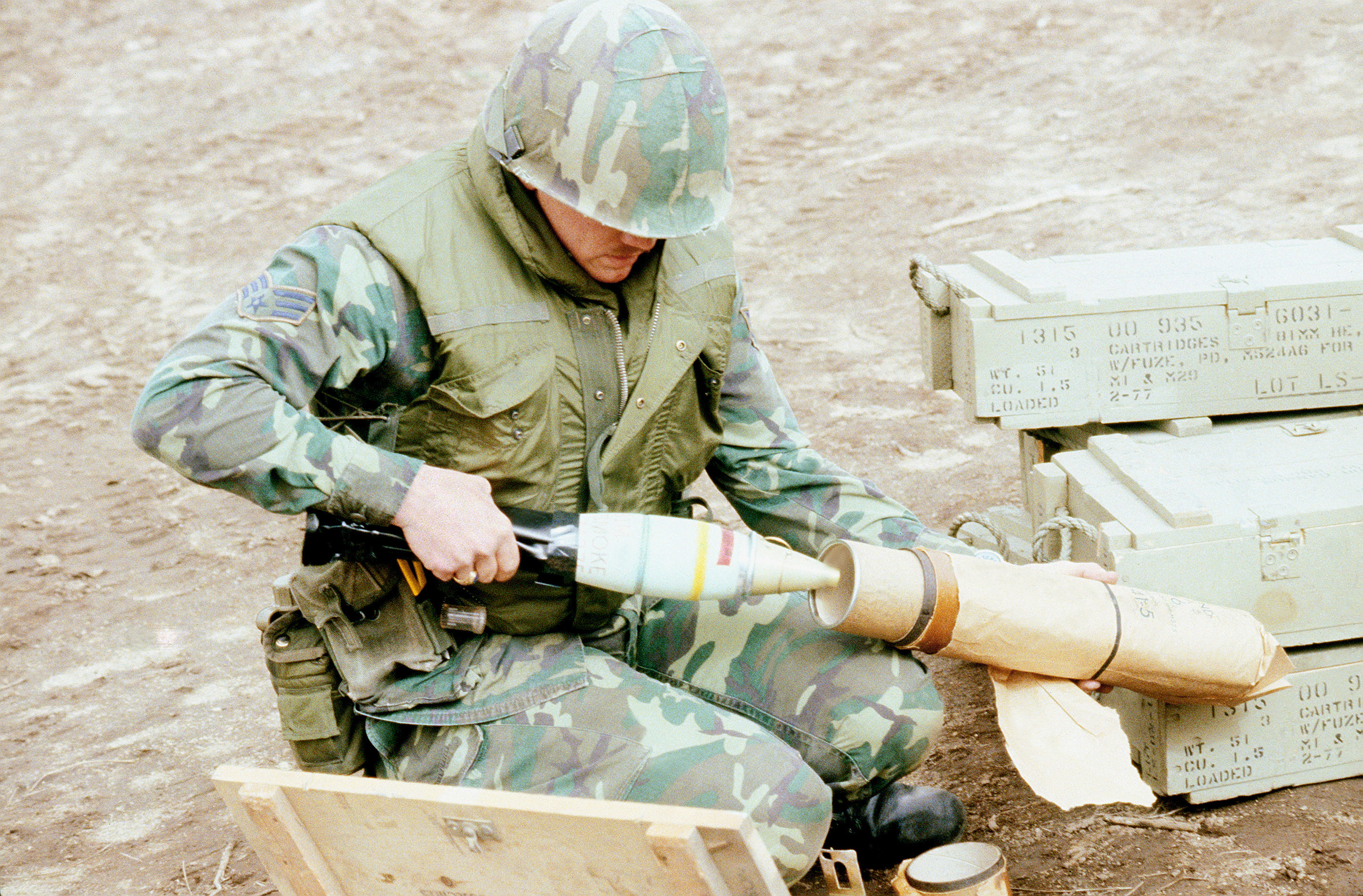
Fuzed 81 mm white phosphorus mortar shell in 1980. Note spelling of "fuze" on adjacent boxes

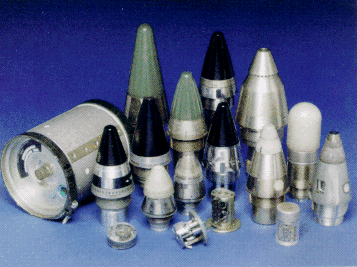
An assortment of fuzes for artillery and mortar shells

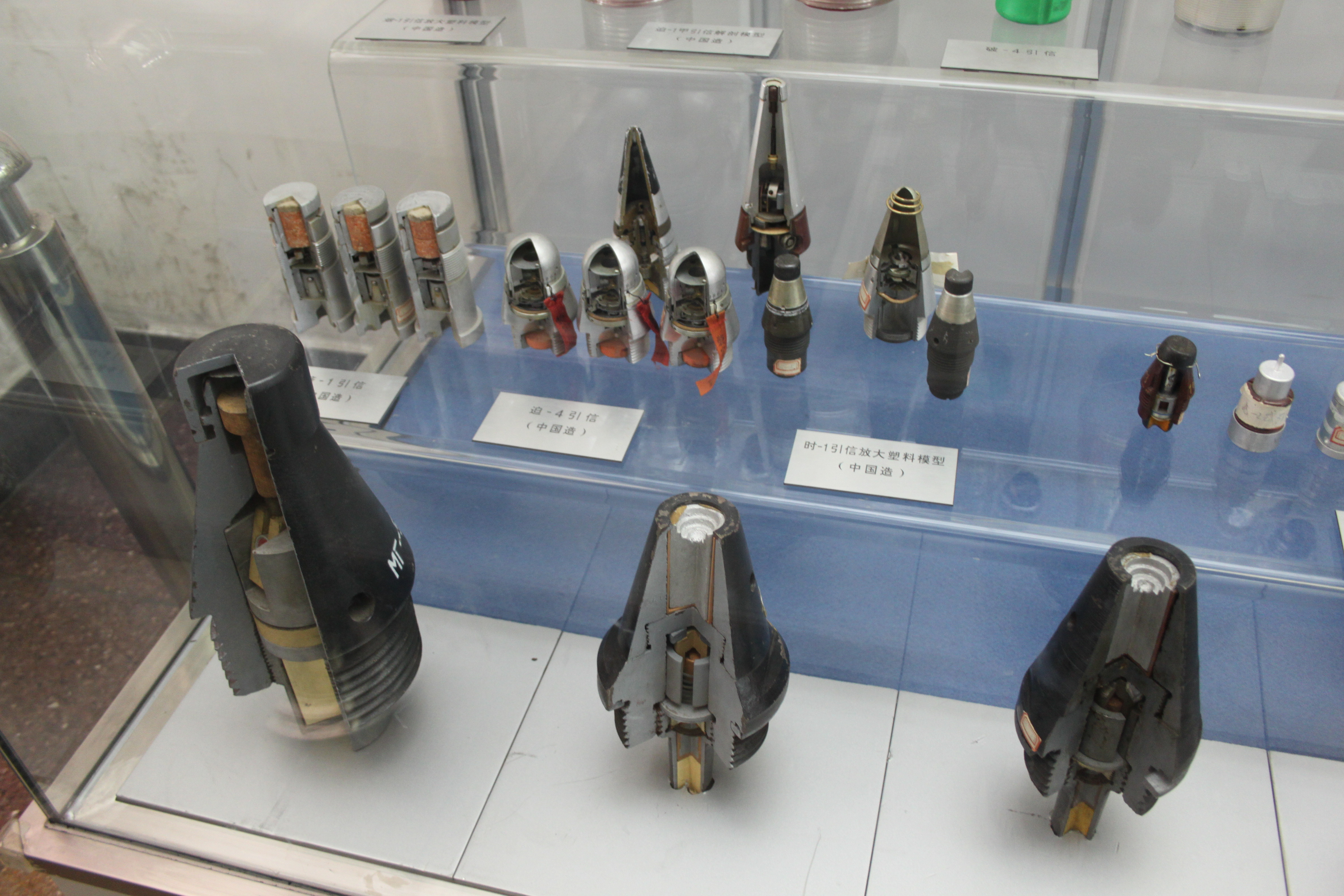
An assortment of Chinese artillery and mortar fuzes

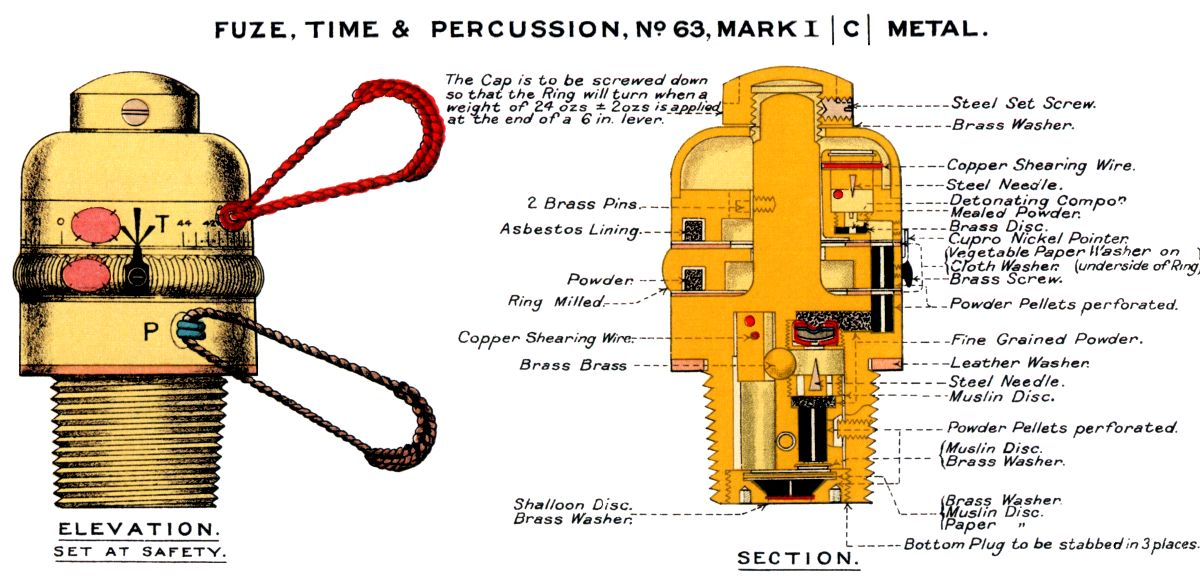
British No. 63 Mk I Time and Percussion fuze, c. 1915 – used in shrapnel shells

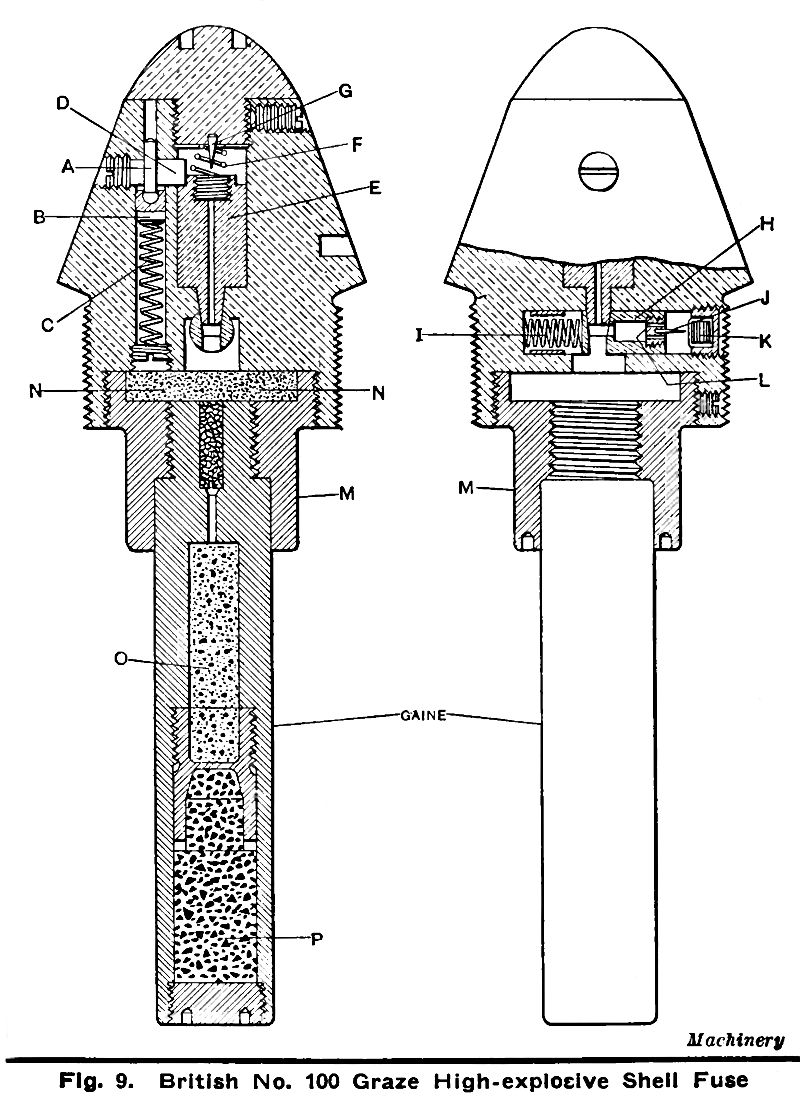
British No. 100 Graze Fuze for high-explosive shell, World War I

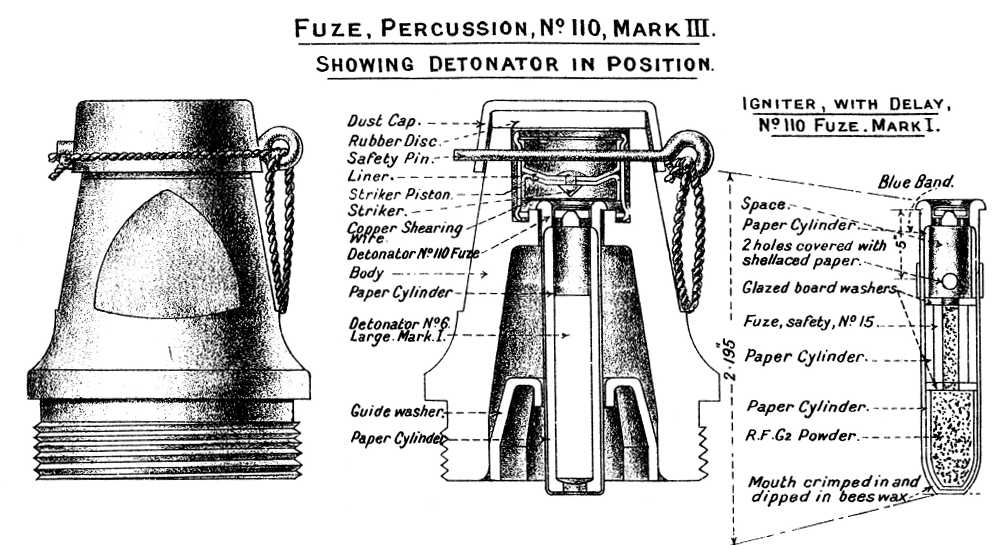
British Percussion Fuze No. 110 Mk III, World War I, used in trench mortars

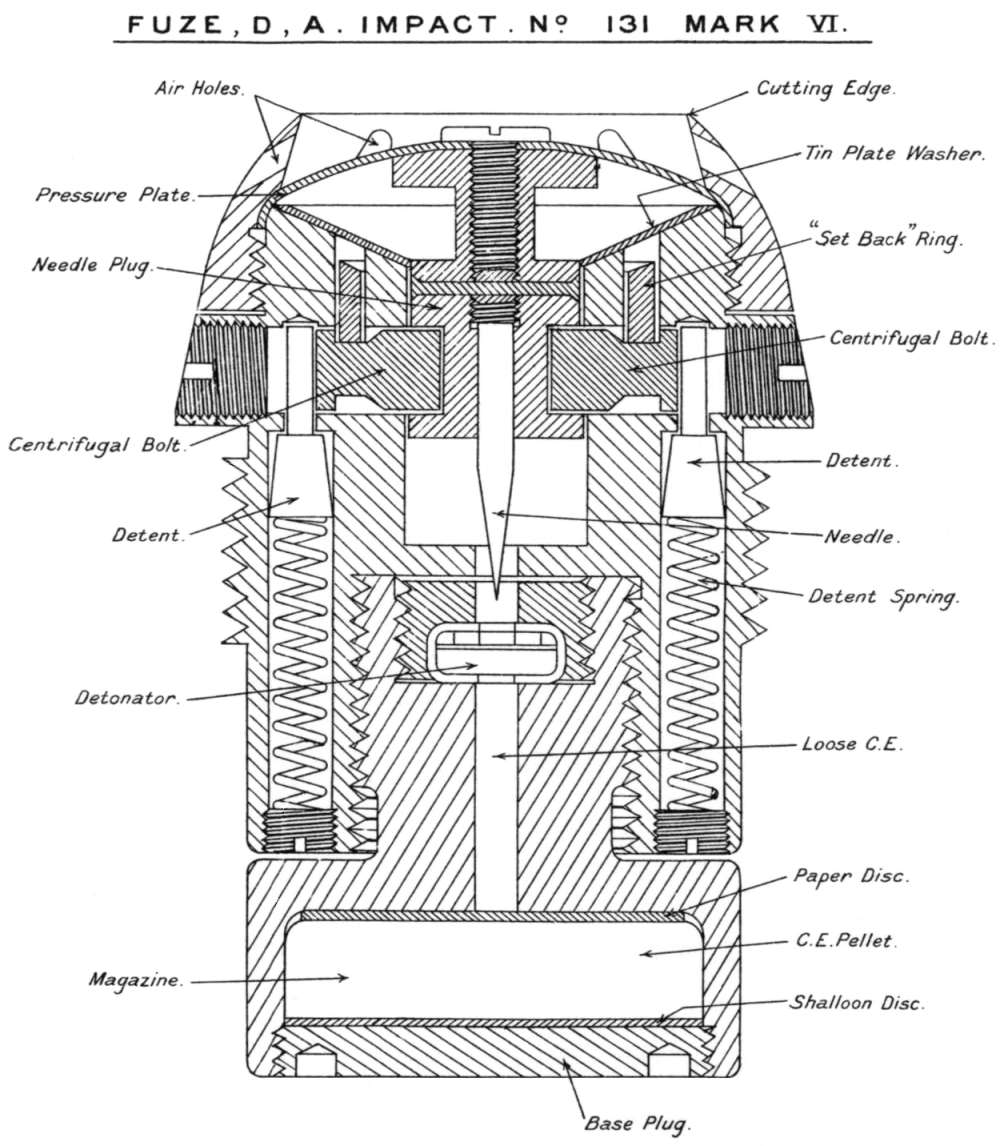
British No. 131 D.A. (Direct Action) Impact Fuze, Mk VI, World War I, used in anti-aircraft artillery

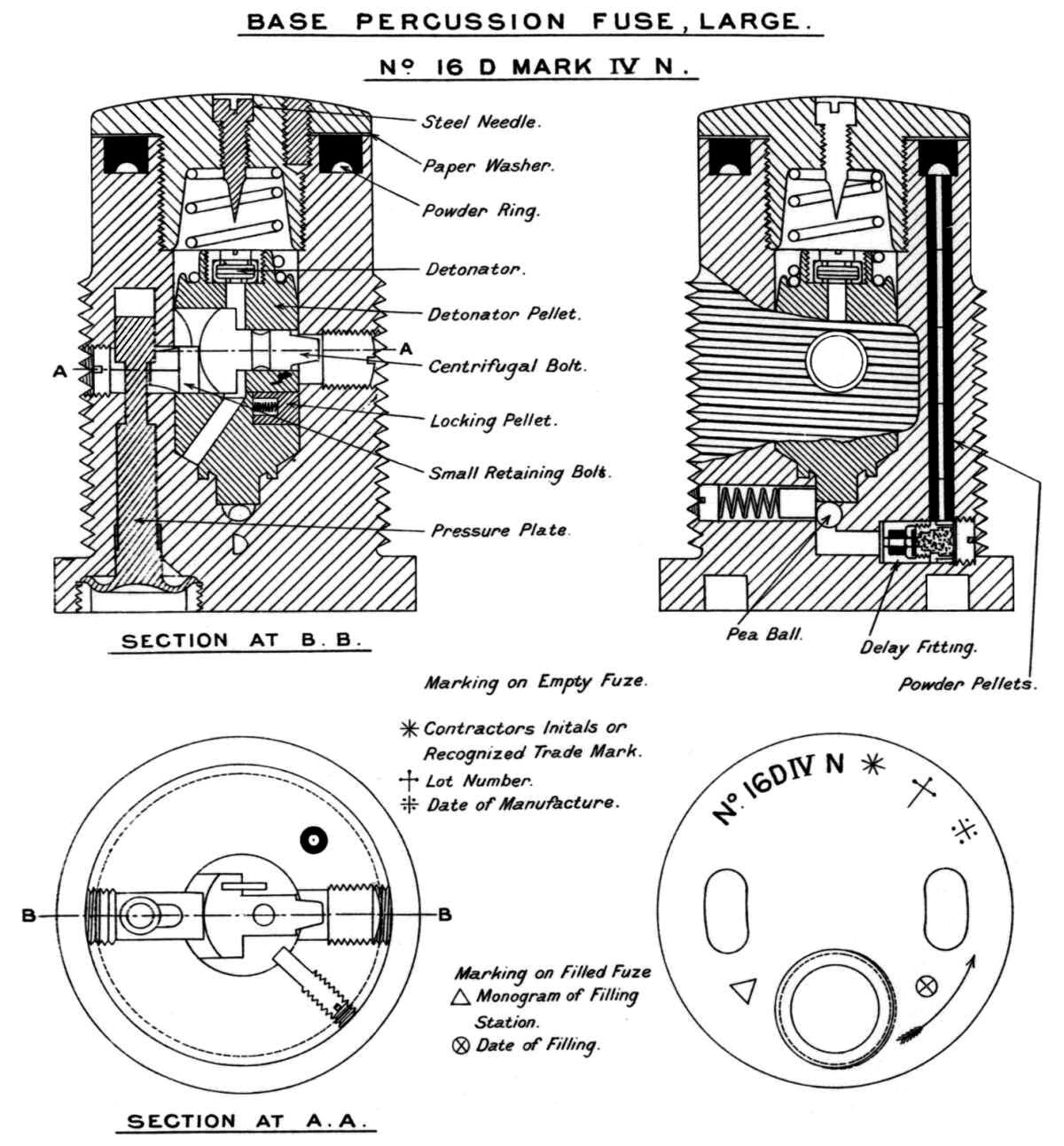
British No. 16 D Mk IV N Base percussion fuze, c. 1936

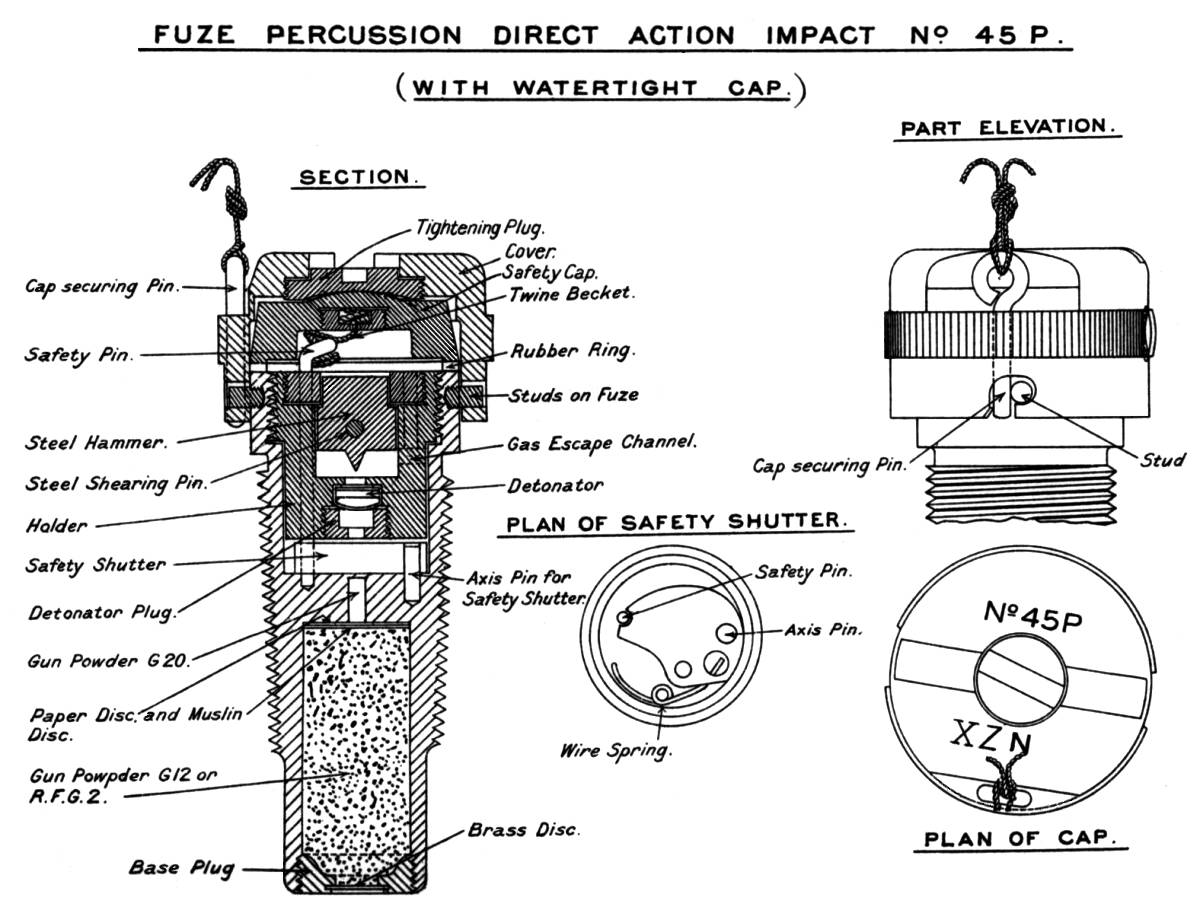
British No. 45 P Direct Action Impact Fuze, World War I, used in howitzer shells

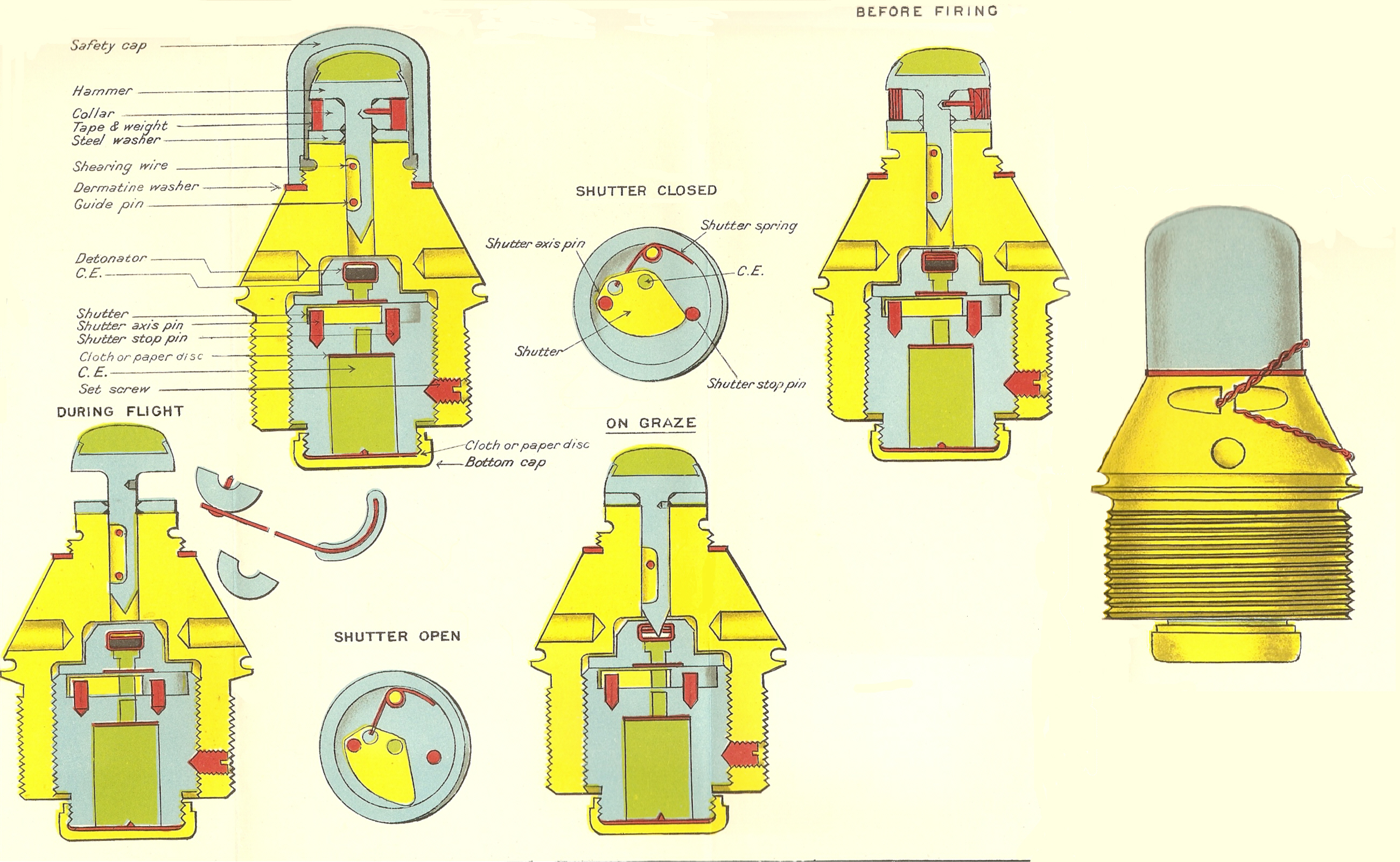
British No 106E Mk 4 Direct Action percussion fuze introduced in the middle of World War 1 and used with HE and Smoke showing the safety and arming sequence. The Original No 106 did not have a shutters or magazine. Fuze No 115E was the same as No 106E but with a streamlined body to match streamlined shells.

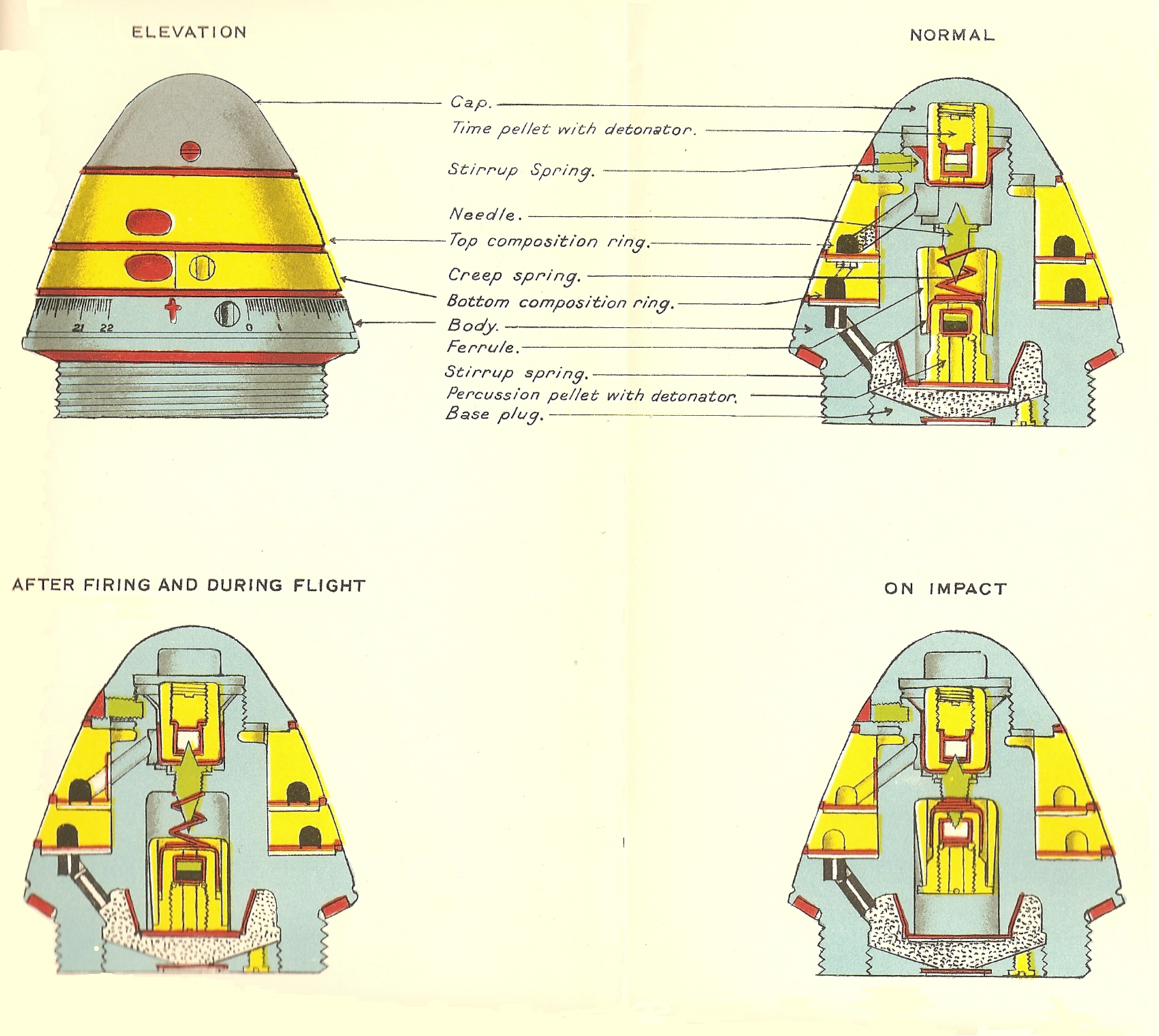
British No 80 Mk XI Time & Percussion showing the safety and arming sequence

== See also ==
- Precision bombing
- Precision-guided munition
- Guided bomb
- Guidance system
- Terminal guidance
- Proximity sensor
- Magnetic proximity fuze
- Missile
