= Schiessbecher =

German grenade launcher

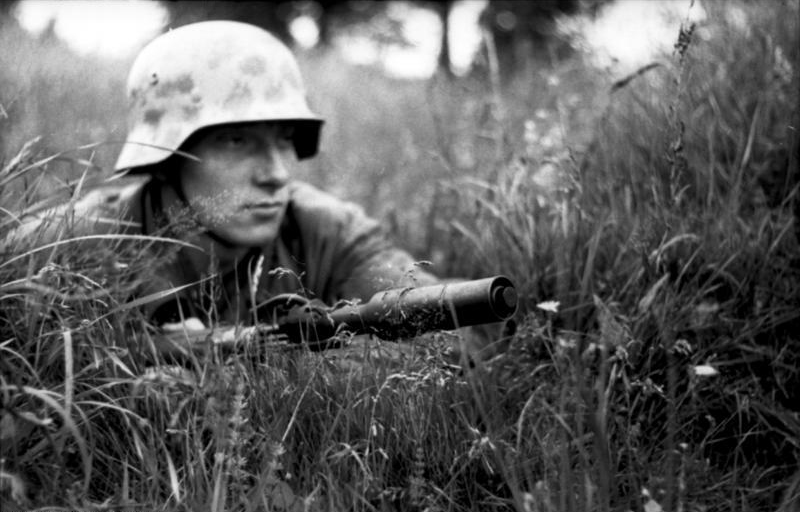
German soldier, armed with a rifle with a Schiessbecher attached

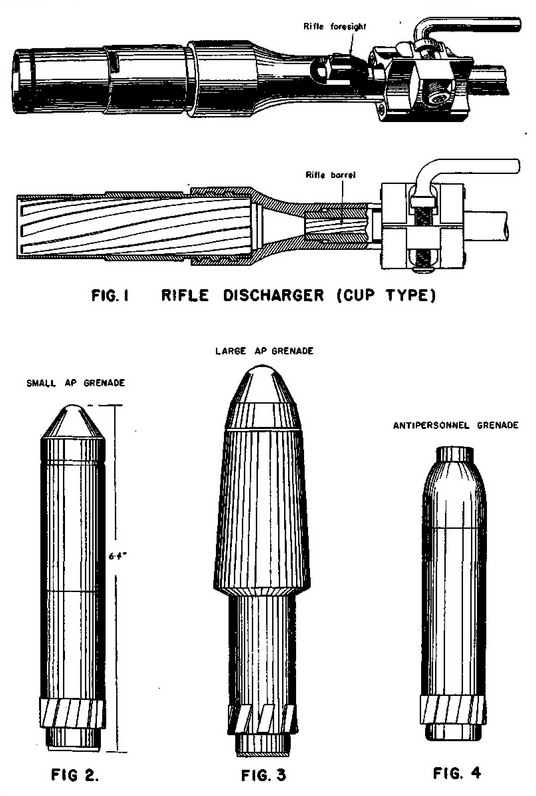
Drawings of German Schiessbecher and grenades

The Schiessbecher (alternatively: Schießbecher) - literally "shooting cup" - was a German grenade launcher of World War II.

A Gewehrgranatgerät ("rifle grenade device") based on rifle grenade launcher models designed during World War I it fitted to the end of a rifle, the grenade being propelled by a special rifle cartridge. The Schiessbecher was introduced in 1942 and intended to replace all previous rifle grenade launcher models in use by German armed forces.

The Schiessbecher rifle grenade launcher could be used against infantry, machine gun nests, small strongpoints and light armored vehicles up to a range of 280 m (310 yd). For these differing tasks several specialized grenades with accompanying special propelling cartridges were developed for the Schiessbecher. The rifle grenade propelling cartridges fired a wooden projectile through the barrel to the rifle grenade that upon impact automatically primed the rifle grenade.

The Schiessbecher had a short rifled barrel with a caliber of 30 mm (1.2 in) and a length of 250 mm (9.8 in). It weighed 750 g (26 oz) and could be attached to weapons chambered for 7.92mm Mauser ammunition like the Karabiner 98k, Karabiner 98a and G98/40 version of the Hungarian 35M bolt-action rifles or the FG 42 automatic rifle

A rather complicated aiming device was mounted to the left of the original sights and allowed for aiming ranges from 0 of up to 250 m (270 yd) in 25 m (27 yd) increments.

The Schiessbecher was produced until May 1944. The total production was 1,450,114.
