= List of German military equipment of World War II =

This page contains a list of equipment used by the German military of World War II. Germany used a number of type designations for their weapons. In some cases, the type designation and series number (i.e. FlaK 30) are sufficient to identify a system, but occasionally multiple systems of the same type are developed at the same time and share a partial designation.

== Personal arms and captured arms ==
=== Knives and bayonets ===
Image	Name/designation	Type	Role/s	Length	From (year)	Notes
	Seitengewehr 42	Combat knife, bayonet	Close combat	17.95 cm (7.07 in)	1944	Never produced in large quantities
	S84/98 III bayonet	Combat knife, bayonet		25.1 cm (9.9 in)	1935	
	Seitengewehr 98	Combat knife, bayonet	Close combat	50 cm (20 in)	1898	First incorporated into the German army as a bayonet for the Mauser M1898 rifle

=== Small arms ===
==== Revolvers, pistols, and pistol carbines (manual and semi-automatic) ====
Image	Name/designation	Type	Role/s	Action	Origin	Variant/s	Base model/s	Manufacturer/s	Cartridge/s	Effective firing range (m)	From (year)	Estimated wartime quantity	Unloaded mass (kg)	Notes
	Bodeo M1889	Revolver	Sidearm	Double action	Kingdom of Italy	Type A Enlisted model and Type B officer's model	-	Societa Siderurgica Glisenti	10.35mm Ordinanza Italiana		1889	?	0.950	During World War II, the Wehrmacht designated the Bodeo as Revolver 680(i) when utilized as an alternative firearm.
	Lebel Modèle 1892	Revolver	Sidearm	Double action, single action	French Third Republic	-	-	Manufacture d'armes de Saint-Étienne	8mm French Ordnance		1892	?	0.85	Designated as Revolver 637(f)
	Beretta M1934	Pistol	Close-quarters, sidearm	Blowback-operated	Kingdom of Italy	-	-	Beretta	.380 ACP		1934	?		Designated as Pistole 671(i)
	Beretta M1935	Pistol	Close-quarters, sidearm	Blowback-operated	Kingdom of Italy	-	-	Beretta	.32 ACP		1935	?		Designated as Pistole 672(i)
	Webley revolver	Revolver	Sidearm	Double action, single action	United Kingdom	MK I, MK I, MK III, MK IV, MK V and MK VI	-	Webley & Scott	.455 Webley,.45 ACP		1887	?	2.4	Designated as Revolver 646(e) for the MK I to Revolver 655(e) for the MK VI.
	Pistole vz. 22	Pistol	Close-quarters, sidearm	Short recoil, rotating barrel	Czechoslovakia	-	-	Zbrojovka Brno, Česká zbrojovka Uherský Brod	.380 ACP		1921	?	0.67	Captured after the defeat of Czechoslovakia and used in very limited numbers. The destination for the pistol is still unknown.
	Pistole vz. 24	Pistol	Close-quarters, sidearm	Blowback-operated, rotating barrel	Czechoslovakia	-	-	Česká zbrojovka Uherský Brod, Böhmische Waffenfabrik (Under German Occupation)	.380 ACP		1923	?	0.67	Designated as Pistole 24(t)
	ČZ vz. 27	Pistol	Close-quarters, sidearm	Blowback-operated, rotating barrel	Czechoslovakia	-	Pistole vz. 24	Česká zbrojovka, Böhmische Waffenfabrik (Under German Occupation)	.32 ACP		1939	?	0.67	Designated as Pistole 27(t)
	ČZ vz. 38	Pistol	Close-quarters, sidearm	Blowback-operated	Czechoslovakia	-	-	Česká zbrojovka Uherský Brod	.380 ACP		1939	?		Designated as Pistole 39(t)
	Nagant M1895	Revolver	Sidearm	Double action, single action	Russian Empire, Belgium	Various	-	Various	7.62×38mmR		1895	?		Designated as Revolver 612(r)
	TT pistol	Pistol	Close-quarters/sidearm	Short recoil actuated, locked breech, single action	Soviet Union	Various	-	Various	7.62x25mm Tokarev; 9x19mm Parabellum		1930	?		Designated as Pistole 615(r) and used by the Army and the Volkssturm.
	Dreyse M1907	Pistol	Close-quarters/sidearm	Blowback-operated, unlocked breech	German Empire	K. Sachs. Gend and Dreyse Rheinmetal ABT. Sommerda	-	Rheinmetall	.32 ACP	25	1905	?	0.710	Used by the Volkssturm and the Volksgrenadier units in 1943–1945.
	Luger P08	Pistol	Close-quarters, sidearm	Short recoil, toggle-locked	German Empire	Various	Borchardt C-93	Deutsche Waffen und Munitionsfabriken, Mauser	7.65×21mm Parabellum, 9×19mm Parabellum	50	1900	3,000,000	0.871	
	Lange Pistole 08	Pistol carbine	Close-quarters, sidearm	Short recoil, toggle-locked	German Empire	Various	Borchardt C-93	Deutsche Waffen und Munitionsfabriken, Mauser	7.65×21mm Parabellum, 9×19mm Parabellum		1913	2,000		Used by Artillerymen in the German Army and Waffen-SS units, and these continued in use until the end of the war in 1945.
	Luger M1900 Carbine	Pistol carbine	Close-quarters, sidearm	Short recoil, toggle-locked	German Empire	Various	Borchardt C-93	Deutsche Waffen und Munitionsfabriken, Mauser	7.65×21mm Parabellum, 9×19mm Parabellum		1900	?		Used in very limited numbers during the late 1943 until the demise of the Nazi Germany in 1945.
	Mauser C96	Pistol	Close-quarters, sidearm	Short recoil	German Empire	Various	-	Mauser	7.63×25mm Mauser, 9×19mm Parabellum		1896	1,100,000+	1.13	19,000 Mauser C96 were used by the Army in 1942–1945 and the government purchased 7,800 Mauser M1930 variants for the Luftwaffe.
	Mauser HSc	Pistol	Close-quarters, sidearm	Blowback-operated	Nazi Germany	HSc Super	-	Mauser	.32 ACP,.380 ACP	40	1935	251,988	0.700	
	Mauser M1914	Pistol	Close-quarters, sidearm	Recoil Operation	German Empire, Nazi Germany	Model 1910 and Model 1934	-	Mauser	.25 ACP (M1910),.32 ACP		1910	3,455		Used mostly by the German police and the Kriegsmarine.
	Sauer 38H	Pistol	Close-quarters, sidearm	Straight blowback	Nazi Germany	-	-	Sauer	.25 ACP,.32 ACP,.380 ACP	25	1938	200,000	0.705	
	Steyr M1912	Pistol	Close-quarters, sidearm	Recoil-operated	Austria-Hungary	Doppelpistole M1912 and Repetierpistole M1912/P16	Roth–Steyr M1907	Steyr	9mm Luger, 9mm Steyr	50	1912	?	1.2	Converted to 9mm Parabellum as the P12(ö)
	Radom vz. 35 Vis	Pistol	Close-quarters, sidearm	Recoil-operated, closed bolt	Poland	-	Browning Hi-Power	FB Radom	9×19mm Parabellum		1939	?	0.950	Occupied Polish production
	Volkspistole	Pistol	Close-quarters, sidearm	Blowback-operated	Nazi Germany	-	-	Walther, Mauser, Gustloff	9×19mm Parabellum	50	1945	16~	1.088	Prototype semi-automatic pistol.
	Walther P38	Pistol	Close-quarters, sidearm	Short recoil, locked breech	Nazi Germany	Various	-	Walther, Mauser, Spreewerk	9×19mm Parabellum	50	1939	1,000,000	0.800	Standard issue pistol during World War II
	Walther PP	Pistol	Close-quarters, sidearm	Straight blowback	Weimar Republic	Various	-	Walther	.32 ACP,.380 ACP,.22 LR,.25 ACP, 9×18mm Ultra		1929	?		
	Walther PPK	Pistol	Close-quarters, sidearm	Straight blowback	Weimar Republic	Various	Walther PP	Walther	.32 ACP,.380 ACP,.22 LR,.25 ACP, 9×18mm Ultra		1929	?		Shorter version of the Walther PP.
	Walther Model 7	Pistol	Close-quarters, sidearm	Blowback-operated	German Empire	-	-	Walther	.25 ACP		1915	?		Used by the Luftwaffe, Tank crews and even the Waffen-SS, served with the model 8.
	Walther Model 8	Pistol	Close-quarters, sidearm	Blowback-operated	Weimar Republic	-	-	Walther	.25 ACP		1920	?		Used by the Luftwaffe, tank crews and even the Waffen-SS, served with the model 7.
	Walther Model 9	Pistol	Close-quarters, sidearm	Blowback-operated	Weimar Republic	-	-	Walther	.25 ACP		1921	?		Used by Tank crews as their pocket pistol.
	Astra 300	Pistol	Close-quarters, sidearm	Blowback/single	Francoist Spain	-	Astra 400	Astra-Unceta y Cia SA	9mm Largo		1941	85,000	0.641	Imported from Spain
	Astra 400	Pistol	Close-quarters, sidearm	Blowback/single	Francoist Spain	Various	-	Astra-Unceta y Cia SA	9mm Largo		1921	6,000~	1.14	Imported from Spain
	Astra 600	Pistol	Close-quarters, sidearm	Blowback-operated	Francoist Spain	-	Astra 400	Astra-Unceta y Cia SA	9×19mm Parabellum		1944	11,000~	1.08	Imported from Spain
	Astra 900	Pistol	Close-quarters, sidearm	Short recoil	Francoist Spain	-	Mauser C96	Astra-Unceta y Cia SA	9x19 Parabellum		1944	1050~		Imported from Spain
	Browning Hi-Power	Pistol	Close-quarters, sidearm	Short recoil, tilting barrel	United States; Belgium	Various	-	Fabrique Nationale	*7.65×21mm Parabellum, 9×19mm Parabellum,.40 S&W	50	1940	300,000+	1.00	Occupied Belgian production
	FÉG 37M	Pistol	Close-quarters/sidearm	Blowback-operated	Kingdom of Hungary	P.Mod 37.Kal 7.65 variant (German issue)	Frommer 29M	Fémáru, Fegyver és Gépgyár (FÉG)	.380 ACP, .32 ACP		1937	?	0.770	Imported from Hungary
	Star Model B	Pistol	Close-quarters, sidearm	Short recoil, tilting barrel	Spain	Various	Colt M1911	Star Bonifacio Echeverria	9×19mm Parabellum		1922	?		Designated as Pistole Star Modell B (.08) and imported from Spain for the Luftwaffe during the Battle of France.
	FN M1910	Pistol	Close-quarters, sidearm	Blowback-operated	Belgium	Various	-	Fabrique Nationale (FN)	.380 ACP,.32 ACP		1910	?	0.590	Occupied Belgian production
	FN M1922	Pistol	Close-quarters, sidearm	Blowback-operated	Belgium	Various	-	Fabrique Nationale (FN)	.380 ACP,.32 ACP		1922	?	0.700	Occupied Belgian production
	Kongsberg M1914 Colt	Pistol	Close-quarters, sidearm	Recoil-operated, closed bolt	Norway	-	Colt M1911	Kongsberg Vaapenfabrikk	.45 ACP		1940	8200		Occupied Norwegian Production
	MAB Model D	Pistol	Close-quarters, sidearm	Blowback-operated	France	Type I and Type II	-	Manufacture d'armes de Bayonne	7.65×17mm Browning SR.380 ACP		1933	?		Occupied France Production
	Pistolet Modèle 1935A	Pistol	Close-quarters, sidearm	Short recoil	France	-	-	Manufacture d'armes de Bayonne	7.65x20mm Long		1935	?		Occupied France Production and designated as Pistole 625(f).
	Colt M1911/A1	Pistol	Close-quarters, sidearm	Short recoil	United States	Various	-	Colt Manufacturing Company	.45 ACP		1911	?		Designated as Pistole 660(a).
	M1917 Revolver	Revolver	Sidearm	Double-action	United States	Slightly differing versions of the M1917 were made by Colt and Smith & Wesson	-	Smith & Wesson, Colt Manufacturing Company	.45 ACP		1917	?		Designated as Revolver 661(a) for the Smith & Wesson version and the Revolver 662(a) for the Colt version.

==== Automatic pistols and submachine guns ====
Image	Name/designation	Type	Role/s	Action	Origin	Base model/s	Manufacturer/s	Cartridge/s	Effective firing range (m)	Cyclic rate of fire (round/min)	From (year)	Estimated wartime quantity	Unloaded mass (kg)	Notes
	EMP 44	Submachine gun	Close-quarters	Straight blowback	Nazi Germany		Erma Werke	9×19mm Parabellum	150–200	500	1943	?	3.6	Prototype Submachine gun
	Erma EMP	Submachine gun	Close-quarters	Blowback	Weimar Republic		Erma Werke	9×19mm Parabellum, 7.63×25mm Mauser, 9×23mm Largo, 7.65×21mm Parabellum	150	550	1931	10,000	4	
	MAS-38	Submachine gun	Close-quarters	Off-axis bolt-travel delayed blowback	France			7.65mm Longue	100	600–700	1938	?	4.340	Captured following the invasion of France, designation as MP 722(f), and Used by the Feldgendarmerie
	Astra 902	Machine Pistol	Close-quarters, sidearm	Short recoil	Kingdom of Spain		Astra-Unceta y Cia SA	7.63×25mm Mauser, 9mm Largo	150–200	900	1927	?	?	A fully automatic version of the Astra 900 pistol but it has a 20 rounds internal box magazine. In 1943, some delivered to the Wehrmacht.
	Astra 904	Machine Pistol	Close-quarters, sidearm	Short recoil	Kingdom of Spain		Astra-Unceta y Cia SA	7.63×25mm Mauser, 9mm Largo	150–200	900–1000	1927	?	1.275	Another fully automatic version of the Astra 900 pistol but it has a 10 or 20 rounds detachable box magazine.
	Mauser M712 Schnellfeuer	Machine pistol	Close-quarters, sidearm	Short recoil	German Empire		Mauser	7.63×25mm Mauser, 9×19mm Parabellum	150–200	900–1000	1896	?	1.13	Approximately 1,235 Mauser M712 were used by the army and Waffen-SS, only 1,123 were used by the Luftwaffe and the Fallschirmjäger units as their survival or self-defense weapon.
	Beretta Model 38	Submachine gun	Close-quarters	Blowback	Kingdom of Italy			9×19mm Parabellum	200	550–600	1938	?	3.25–4.2	Used by the Wehrmacht and it variants
	MP 18	Submachine gun	Close-quarters	Blowback, open-bolt	German Empire		Bergmann Waffenfabrik	9×19mm Parabellum	200	350–500	1918	30,000	4.18	Used by the Waffen-SS in early 1930s and it was replaced by the MP 38. In mid 1944–1945 some were issued to the Volkssturm.
	MP 28	Submachine gun	Close-quarters	Blowback, open-bolt	German Empire		Bergmann Waffenfabrik	9×19mm Parabellum	200	550–600	1928	?	4.0	Used by the Feldgendarmerie army and the Volkssturm.
	MP 34	Submachine gun	Close-quarters	Blowback, open-bolt	Austria		Waffenfabrik Steyr	9×19mm Parabellum, 9×23 Steyr, 9×25mm Mauser, 7.63×25mm Mauser,.45 ACP, 7.65×21mm Parabellum	150–200	600	1929	?	4.25	Used by Waffen-SS and the Wehrmacht
	MP 35	Submachine gun	Close-quarters	Blowback, open-bolt	Nazi Germany		Bergmann, Schultz & Larsen	9×19mm Parabellum	150–200	540	1935	40,000	4.24	Used by the Waffen-SS and the Wehrmacht
	MP 38	Submachine gun	Close-quarters	Straight blowback, open bolt	Nazi Germany		Steyr-Mannlicher, Erma Werke, Haenel	9×19mm Parabellum		550	1938	1,109~		Used by the Waffen-SS, Feldgendarmerie, Army and the Volkssturm
	MP 40	Submachine gun	Close-quarters	Straight blowback, open bolt	Nazi Germany		Steyr-Mannlicher, Erma Werke, Haenel	9×19mm Parabellum	100–200	500–550	1940	1,100,000~	3.97	
	MP 41	Submachine gun	Close-quarters	Straight blowback, open bolt	Nazi Germany		Steyr-Mannlicher, Erma Werke, Haenel	9×19mm Parabellum		550	1941	?		Used by the Waffen-SS and Ordnungspolizei
	MP 3008	Submachine gun	Close-quarters	Blowback, open-bolt	Nazi Germany	[modified British sten smg for use with parabellum rounds]		9×19mm Parabellum	100	450	1945	10,000	3.2	Used by the Volkssturm as a last-ditch weapon.
	Suomi KP/-31	Submachine gun	Close-quarters	Straight blowback	Finland		Tikkakoski	9×19mm Parabellum	200	750–900	1931	?	4.6	Imported from Finland.
	Danuvia 39M	Submachine gun	Close-quarters	Lever-delayed blowback	Kingdom of Hungary			9×25mm Mauser		750	1939	?	4.4	Imported from Hungary.
	Orița M1941	Submachine gun	Close-quarters	Blowback	Kingdom of Romania			9×19mm Parabellum	200	400–600	1943	?	4	Imported from Romania.
	ZK-383	Submachine gun	Close-quarters	Blowback	Czechoslovakia			9×19mm Parabellum	250	500–700	1938	?	4.83	Occupied Czech production.
	PPD-34/38	Submachine gun	Close-quarters	Blowback, open bolt	Soviet Union			7.62×25mm Tokarev	250	800–1000	1934	?		Designated as Maschinenpistole 715(r).
	PPD-40	Submachine gun	Close-quarters	Blowback, open bolt	Soviet Union			7.62×25mm Tokarev	250	800–1000	1940	?		Designated as Maschinenpistole 716(r).
	MP 41(r)	Submachine gun	Close-quarters	Blowback, open bolt	Soviet Union			7.62×25mm Tokarev, 7.63×25mm Mauser, 9×19mm Parabellum		1250	1941	?		Captured PPSh-41 converted to 9×19mm Parabellum caliber for use by German forces.
	PPSh-41	Submachine gun	Close-quarters	Blowback, open bolt	Soviet Union			7.62×25mm Tokarev, 7.63×25mm Mauser; 9×19mm Parabellum		1250	1941	?		Captured, unconverted PPSh-41 placed in German service and supplied with 7.63×25mm Mauser ammunition and designated as Maschinenpistole 717(r).

=== Rifles ===
Image	Name/designation	Type	Role/s	Action	Origin	Manufacturer/s	Cartridge/s	Effective firing range (m)	From (year)	Estimated wartime quantity	Unloaded mass (kg)	Notes
	Gewehr 41(M)	Rifle	Front-line, assault	Bolt-action, gas trap, rotating-bolt	Nazi Germany	Mauser	7.92×57mm Mauser	400	1941	6,673	4.9	
	Gewehr 41(W)	Rifle	Front-line/assault	Gas trap, flapper locking	Nazi Germany	Walther	7.92×57mm Mauser	400	1941	145,000	4.9	
	Gewehr 43	Rifle	Front-line/assault	Short-stroke piston, flapper locking	Nazi Germany	Walther	7.92×57mm Mauser	500	1943	402,713	4.4	
	Gewehr 43 sniper rifle	Sniper rifle	Long-range precision	Short-stroke piston, flapper locking	Nazi Germany	Walther	7.92×57mm Mauser	800	1943	53,435	4.4	
	Gewehr 98	Rifle	Front-line infantry	Bolt action	German Empire	Mauser	7.92×57mm Mauser	500	1898	9,000,000+	4.09	
	Karabiner 98a	Carbine	Front-line	Bolt action	German Empire	Mauser	7.92×57mm Mauser		1908	1,500,000		
	Karabiner 98b	Rifle	Front-line	Bolt action	German Empire	Mauser	7.92×57mm Mauser		1923	?		
	Gewehr 98 sniper rifle	Sniper rifle	Long-range precision	Bolt action	German Empire	Mauser	7.92×57mm Mauser	800≥	1935	15,000	4.09	
	HIW VSK	Rifle	Front-line infantry	Bolt-action	Nazi Germany	Hessische Industrie Werke	7.92×57mm Mauser		1944	?		
	HIW VSK Carbine	Carbine	Front-line infantry	Blow forward	Nazi Germany	Hessische Industrie Werke	7.92×33mm Kurz		1944	?		
	Karabiner 98k	Rifle	Front-line infantry	Bolt-action	Nazi Germany	Mauser	7.92×57mm Mauser	500	1935	14,000,000~	4.1	Main German rifle during World War II
	Karabiner 98k sniper rifle	Sniper rifle	Long-range precision	Bolt-action	Nazi Germany	Mauser	7.92×57mm Mauser	1000≥	1935	132,000	4.1	
	M30 Luftwaffe drilling	Combination rifle, shotgun	Hunting/self-defence	Blitz lock system	Nazi Germany	Sauer	9.3x74mmR, 12 Gauge		1941	2456	3.4	Issued to Luftwaffe aircraft as survival weapon
	Gewehr 98/40 (FÉG 35M)	Rifle	Front-line	Bolt-action	Kingdom of Hungary		7.92×57mm Mauser		1941	138,000	3.98	Imported from Hungary
	Gewehr 24(t) (vz. 24)	Rifle	Front-line infantry	Bolt-action	Czechoslovakia	Zbrojovka Brno	7.92×57mm Mauser, 7×57mm Mauser, 7.65×53mm Mauser		1939	330,000	4.2	Upgraded to Karabiner 98k standards, occupied Czech production
	StG 44 (Sturmgewehr 44)	Assault rifle	Front-line/assault	Long-stroke piston, tilting-bolt	Nazi Germany	Mauser	7.92×33mm Kurz	450	1945	425,977	4	
	vz. 33 as Gewehr 33(t)	Rifle	Front-line infantry	Bolt-action	Czechoslovakia	Zbrojovka Brno	7.92×57mm Mauser		1939	131,503	3.1	Occupied Czech production

=== Grenades and grenade launchers ===
Image	Name/designation	Type	Origin	Mass (g)	Warhead	Warhead mass (g)	Detonation mechanism	Maximum firing range (m)	Estimated wartime quantity	From (year)	Notes
	Blendkörper 1H	Smoke grenade	Nazi Germany	370	Titanium tetrachloride	260					
	Blendkörper 2H	Smoke grenade	Nazi Germany	480	Titanium tetrachloride (outer); Calcium chloride	250 (outer); 25 (inner)					
	Gewehr-Granatpatrone 40	Shaped charge rifle grenade	Nazi Germany	250	RDX	175	Graze fuse	91			
	Gewehr-Panzergranate	Shaped charge rifle grenade	Nazi Germany	515	TNT	50	Graze fuse	114			
	Gewehr-Sprenggranate	Rifle grenade	Nazi Germany	260	PETN	31	Graze fuse	500			
	Gross Panzergranate 46 & 61	Shaped charge rifle grenade	Nazi Germany	410 (Pzgr 46); 580 (Pzgr 61)	TNT	146 (Pzgr 46); 246 (Pzgr 61)	Base fuse	180 (Pzgr 46); 200 (Pzgr 61)			
	Hafthohlladung	Shaped charge anti-tank grenade	Nazi Germany	3000 (H3 version); 3500 (H3.5 version)					553,900	1942	
	Kampfpistole	Flare gun	Nazi Germany	1400						1939	
	Leuchtpistole 34	Flare gun	Nazi Germany	730						1934	
	Leuchtpistole 42	Flare gun	Nazi Germany	1120						1943	
	Model 24 Grenade	Hand grenade	Weimar Republic	595	TNT	170	Friction igniter			1924	
	Model 39 grenade	Hand grenade	Nazi Germany	230	Donarit - (relatively similar to amatol)	112	Instant, 1, 4.5, 7.5 or 10 second delay			1939	
	Model 43	Hand grenade	Nazi Germany							1943	
	Molotov cocktail	Hand thrown incendiary weapon	Spain							1936	
	Panzerwurfkörper 42	HEAT Anti-tank grenade	Nazi Germany	600		60	Graze fuse	69			
	Panzerwurfmine	Shaped charge hand thrown Anti-tank grenade	Nazi Germany	1360		500			203,800	1943	
	Propaganda-Gewehrgranate	Rifle grenade	Nazi Germany	230	Propaganda leaflets	200	Time fuse	460			
	Schiessbecher	Rifle grenade	Nazi Germany	750				280	1,450,114	1942	
	Sprengpatrone	Rifle grenade	Nazi Germany	99	PETN	22	Nose fuse	180			
	Sturmpistole	Flare gun	Nazi Germany	2500				180			
	Wurfgranate Patrone 326	Rifle grenade	Nazi Germany	91	TNT	7.1	Nose fuse	270			
	Wurfkörper 361	Rifle grenade	Nazi Germany	230	Amatol	110	Time fuse	78			

=== Mines ===
- Behelfs-Schützenmine S.150
- Glasmine 43
- Hohl-Sprung mine 4672
- Holzmine 42
- Panzer stab 43
- Riegel mine 43
- Schu-mine 42
- S-mine
- Teller mine (all models)
- Topfmine (all models)

=== Recoilless rifles ===
- Panzerfaust
- Panzerschreck
- 7.5 cm Leichtgeschütz 40
- 10.5 cm Leichtgeschütz 40
- 10.5 cm Leichtgeschütz 42
- SG 113 – planned anti-tank weapon for aircraft

=== Flamethrowers ===
- Einstossflammenwerfer 46
- Flammenwerfer 35
- Flammenwerfer 41
- Abwehrflammenwerfer 42

== Infantry rifles and machine guns ==
=== Infantry rifles and dual-purpose machine guns ===
Image	Name/designation	Type	Role/s	Action	Origin	Manufacturer/s	Cartridge/s	Effective firing range (m)	Cyclic rate of fire (round/min)	From (year)	Estimated wartime quantity	Unloaded mass (kg)	Notes
-	Barnitzke machine gun	General-purpose machine gun	Fire support, suppression, defense	Delayed blowback	Nazi Germany		7.92×57mm Mauser				?		Prototype machine gun
	FG 42	Battle rifle, light machine gun	Front-line, assault, fire support, suppression, defense	Gas-operated, rotating bolt	Nazi Germany	Rheinmetall, Heinrich Krieghoff Waffenfabrik, L. O. Dietrich	7.92×57mm Mauser	300–600	750–900	1943	7000	4.2–4.95	Used by Fallschirmjäger of the Luftwaffe
	Grossfuss Sturmgewehr	Assault rifle	Front-line, assault	Gas-delayed blowback	Nazi Germany	Metall- und Lackwarenfabrik Johannes Großfuß	7.92×33mm Kurz		500–550		9	4.7	Prototype assault rifle
	StG 44	Assault rifle	Front-line, assault	Long-stroke piston, tilting bolt, selective fire	Nazi Germany	C. G. Haenel Waffen und Fahrradfabrik	7.92×33mm Kurz	300–600	500–600	1943	425,977	4.6	
	Knorr-Bremse 1935/36	Automatic rifle, light machine gun	Fire support, suppression, defense	Long-stroke piston, open bolt	Sweden	Svenska Automatvapen AB	6.5×55mm Swedish		480	1940	?	8.5	
	MG 08	Heavy machine gun	Fire support, suppression, defense	Short recoil, toggle locked	German Empire	DWM, Spandau and Erfurt arsenals	7.92×57mm Mauser, 7.65×53mm Mauser, 7x57mm Mauser, 13×92mm TuF (TuF variant)	100–2000	450–500	1908	?	69	
	MG 13	General-purpose machine gun	Fire support, suppression, defense	Short recoil	Weimar Republic		7.92×57mm Mauser	100–2000	600	1930	?	13.3	
	MG 15	General-purpose machine gun	Fire support, suppression, defense	Recoil-operated	Weimar Republic; Nazi Germany	Rheinmetall	7.92×57mm Mauser		1000–1050		?	12.4	Former aircraft gun
	MG 30	General-purpose machine gun	Anti-aircraft, airspace denial, fire support, suppression, defense	Recoil-operated	Switzerland; Austria	Steyr-Werke AG	7.92×57mm Mauser, 8×56mmR, 7×57mm Mauser		700–900	1930	?	9.5	
	MG 34	General-purpose machine gun	Anti-aircraft, airspace denial, fire support, suppression, defense	Recoil-operated, open bolt, rotating bolt	Nazi Germany	Rheinmetall-Borsig AG Soemmerda, Mauserwerke AG, Steyr-Daimler-Puch AG, Waffenwerke Brünn	7.92×57mm Mauser	200–2000	600–1700	1935	577,120	12.1	
	MG 42	General-purpose machine gun	Anti-aircraft, airspace denial, fire support, suppression, defense	Recoil-operated, roller-locked	Nazi Germany	Mauser, Wilhelm Gustloff Stiftung, Steyr-Daimler-Puch, Großfuß AG, MAGET	7.92×57mm Mauser	200–2000	900–1500	1942	423,600	11.6	
	MG 45	General-purpose machine gun	Anti-aircraft, airspace denial, fire support, suppression, defense	Roller-delayed blowback	Nazi Germany		7.92×57mm Mauser	200–732	1350–1800	1944	10	9	Prototype machine gun
-	MG 39 Rh	General-purpose machine gun	Fire support, suppression, defense	Gas-operated	Nazi Germany		7.92×57mm Mauser	100–1600		1937	?	9.58	
	MG 81	General-purpose machine gun	Anti-aircraft, airspace denial, fire support, suppression, defense	Recoil-operated	Nazi Germany		7.92×57mm Mauser	200-800	1400–1600	1940	?	6.5	Former aircraft mounted weapon
	Schwarzlose MG M.07/12	Medium machine-gun	Fire support, suppression, defense	Toggle-delayed blowback	Austria-Hungary	Steyr	8×50mmR Mannlicher, 8×56mmR, 7.92×57mm Mauser, 6.5×53mmR, 6.5×55mm, 7.62×54mmR,.303 British		400–880	1908	?	41.4	
	VMG 1927	General-purpose machine gun	Fire support, suppression, defense	Short recoil	Weimar Republic		8×57mm IS			1927	?	11.48	
	Wimmersperg Spz	Substitute assault rifle, light machine gun	Front-line, assault	Gas-operated	Nazi Germany		7.92×33mm Kurz	400		1944	?		Prototype assault rifle
	Sturmgewehr 45K	Assault rifle	Front-line, assault	Gas-operated, tilting block bolt	Nazi Germany		7.92×33mm Kurz	Unknown	450	1945	3		Prototype assault rifle
	ZB vz. 26	General-purpose machine gun	Fire support, suppression, defense	Gas-operated, tilting breechblock	Czechoslovakia	Zbrojovka Brno, Military Technical Institute Kragujevac	7.92×57mm Mauser	100–1000	500	1924	?	9.65	Captured following the Occupation of Czechoslovakia, designation as the MG 26(t)
	ZB vz. 30	General-purpose machine gun	Fire support, suppression, defense	Gas-operated, tilting breechblock	Czechoslovakia	Zbrojovka Brno, Military Technical Institute Kragujevac	7.92×57mm Mauser	100–1000	550–650	1930	?	9.10	Captured following the Occupation of Czechoslovakia, designation as the MG 30(t)
	ZB-53	Medium machine gun	Anti-aircraft, airspace denial, fire support, suppression, defense	Gas-operated	Czechoslovakia	Zbrojovka Brno	7.92×57mm Mauser		500–800	1936	?	21	

=== Vehicle and aircraft machine guns ===
Image	Name/designation	Type	Action	Application/s	Origin	Base model/s	Manufacturer/s	Cartridge/s	From (year)	Unloaded mass (kg)	Notes
	MG 15	Light machine gun	Recoil operated		Nazi Germany	MG 30	Rheinmetall	7.92×57mm Mauser	1932	12.4	
	MG 17	Light machine gun	Recoil operated, closed bolt	aircraft	Nazi Germany	MG 30	Rheinmetall-Borsig	7.92×57mm Mauser	1934	10.2	
	MG 81	Light machine gun	Recoil-operated	aircraft	Nazi Germany	MG 34		7.92×57mm Mauser	1940	6.5	
	MG 131	Heavy machine gun	Recoil operated, short recoil, closed bolt	aircraft	Nazi Germany			13×64mmB	1940	16.6	
	MG 151/15	Autocannon			Nazi Germany		Waffenfabrik Mauser AG	15×96mm cartridge	1940	42.7	
	MG 151/20	Autocannon			Nazi Germany		Waffenfabrik Mauser AG	20×82mm cartridge	1941	42	
	Mauser MG 213	Autocannon	Gas operated, single-barrel 5-rounds revolver		Nazi Germany			20×146mm cartridge	1944	75	
	Mauser MK 213	Autocannon	Gas operated, single-barrel 5-rounds revolver		Nazi Germany			30×146mm cartridge	1944	75	
	MG FF	Autocannon	API blowback	aircraft	Nazi Germany	Oerlikon FF F cannon		20×80mm RB	1936	26.3	
	MK 101	Autocannon	Recoil operated	Henschel Hs 129; Heinkel He 177A-1/U2 Zerstörer	Nazi Germany			30x184B	1940	139	
	MK 103	Autocannon	Gas operated, recoil operated	Henschel Hs 129 B-1; Dornier Do 335; Flakpanzer IV "Kugelblitz"	Nazi Germany	MK 101		30x184B	1943	141	
	MK 108	Autocannon	API blowback	Messerschmitt Bf 110G-2 bomber destroyers; Messerschmitt Bf 109G-6/U4	Nazi Germany			30×90RB	1943	58	
	MK 112 (55mm aircraft cannon)	Autocannon			Nazi Germany			55mm	1945	271	
	MK 214A	Autocannon			Nazi Germany			Fixed QF 50×419mmR			
	Schräge Musik	Autocannon			Nazi Germany						
	BK 3.7	Anti-tank autocannon	Short recoil		Nazi Germany			37×263mm	1942	295	
	BK 5	Anti-tank autocannon			Nazi Germany			Fixed QF 50×419mmR	1943	540	
	BK 7.5	Anti-tank autocannon			Nazi Germany			Fixed QF 75×714mmR			

== Artillery ==
=== Demolition charges ===
- Stielgranate 41
- Stielgranate 42

=== Infantry mortars ===
- Krieghoff Model L
- 5 cm Granatwerfer 36
  - M19 Maschinengranatwerfer (automatic, bunker version of 5 cm Granatwerfer 36 on fixed mount)
  - 5 cm Granatwerfer 40 – not accepted by army as army has started to retire 50mm mortars
- 8 cm Granatwerfer 34
  - Kz 8 cm GrW 42 (Kurzer 8 cm Granatwerfer 42) - weight reduction of 8 cm Granatwerfer 34
  - 8 cm Granatwerfer 73 (1944) – no data on usage
- 8 cm minomet vz. 36 – captured from Czechs
- 8 cm Granatwerfer 33(ö)
- 10 cm Nebelwerfer 35
- Granatwerfer 42 (12 cm sGrWr 42)

=== Heavy mortars and rocket launchers ===
- (copy of Russian Katyusha rocket launcher)
- Reihenwerfer
- 10 cm Nebelwerfer 40
- 15 cm Nebelwerfer 41 (multiple-rocket launcher)
- Panzerwerfer (self-propelled multiple-rocket launcher with HE warheads)
  - Panzerwerfer 42 (also known as 15 cm Do-Gerat 42)
- 20 cm leichter Ladungswerfer
- 21 cm Nebelwerfer 42 (multiple-rocket launcher)
- 21 cm heavy mortar 69
- 28/32 cm Nebelwerfer 41 (multiple-rocket launcher)
  - Schweres Wurfgerät 40/41 (rockets launched directly from crates)
    - Wurfrahmen 40 (rocket crates carrier/launcher)
- 30 cm Nebelwerfer 42 (multiple-rocket launcher)
- 30 cm Raketenwerfer 56 (multiple-rocket launcher)
- 38 cm schwerer Ladungswerfer
- Karl-Gerät (Gerät 040 and Gerät 041) - self-propelled 600mm and 540mm mortars family

=== Field artillery ===
- 2 cm KwK 30 – Panzer II tank gun
- 3.7 cm KwK 36 – Panzer III tank gun
- Skoda 37 mm A7
- 5 cm KwK 38 – Panzer III tank gun
  - 5 cm KwK 39 – Panzer III tank gun
- 7.5 cm FK 16 nA
- 7.5 cm FK 18
- 7.5 cm FK 38
- 7.5 cm FK 7M85 (7.5 cm FK 40) – AT gun modified for dual AT/field gun role, 10 built
  - 7.5 cm FK 7M59 – simplified production version
- 7.5 cm Gebirgsgeschütz 36 – most common German mountain gun of World War II
- 7.5 cm Infanteriegeschütz 37 (7.5 cm le.IG 37)
- 7.5 cm Infanteriegeschütz 42 (7,5 cm le.IG 42)
- 7.5 cm leichtes Infanteriegeschütz 18 (7,5 cm le.IG 18)
- 7.5 cm KwK 37 – Panzer IV tank gun
- 7.5 cm KwK 40 – Panzer IV tank gun
- 7.5 cm KwK 42 – Panther tank gun
- Ehrhardt 7.5 cm Model 1901 – Anti-tank, field gun and coastal defense
- Obice da 75/18 modello 34 (Acquired from the Italians by the Wehrmacht and redesignated 7.5 cm LeFH 255(i))
- 76 mm divisional gun M1942 (ZiS-3) (Captured from Russia by the Wehrmacht and redesignated Pak 36/39 (r))
- 8 cm kanon vz. 30
- 8.8 cm KwK 36 – Tiger I tank gun
- 8.8 cm KwK 43 – Tiger II tank gun
- 10 cm houfnice vz. 30 (howitzer)
- 10 cm K 17
- 10 cm M. 14 Feldhaubitze
- 10 cm schwere Kanone 18
- Canon de 105 mle 1913 Schneider
- 10.5 cm Gebirgshaubitze 40
- 10.5 cm hruby kanon vz. 35
- 10.5 cm leFH 16
- 10.5 cm leFH 18 (most common German field gun)
- 10.5 cm leFH 18/40
- 10.5 cm leFH 18/42 (developed but not accepted by army)
- 10.5 cm leFH 43 (development incomplete by end of World War II)
- 10.5 cm leFH 18M
- 122 mm howitzer M1938 (M-30) (Captured from Russia by the Wehrmacht and redesignated 12.2 cm s.F.H.396(r))
- Skoda K-series (among these guns "15 cm hrubá houfnice vz. 1937" was most common)
- 15 cm Schiffskanone C/28 in Mörserlafette
- 15 cm hrubá houfnice vz. 25
- 15 cm Kanone 18
- 15 cm Kanone 39
- 15 cm sFH 13 (obsolete)
- 15 cm sFH 18 (2nd most common German gun)
- 15 cm sIG 33 (heaviest infantry gun)
- 152 mm gun M1910/34 – captured from Russian
- 152 mm howitzer M1938 (M-10) – captured from Russian
- 17 cm Kanone 18 (heaviest German field artillery piece)
  - 15 cm Schiffskanone C/28 in Mörserlafette (surplus guns on excess carriages of 17 cm Kanone 18)
- 203 mm howitzer M1931 (B-4) – captured from Russian
- Obice da 210/22 – produced under German control after surrender of Italy
- Canon de 220 L mle 1917 – captured from French

=== Fortress and siege guns ===
- Rheinbote (rocket artillery)
- V-3 cannon
- 12.7 cm SK C/34 naval gun (coastal defense)
- 15 cm K (E) (coastal defense, railroad gun)
- 17 cm K (E) (railroad gun)
- 15 cm Kanone 16 (coastal defense)
- 15 cm SK C/28 (coastal defense and 8 made into field guns)
- 15 cm Autokanone M. 15/16 (coastal defense and exported)
- Canon de 155mm GPF (coastal defense)
- 20.3 cm K (E) (railroad gun)
- 21 cm K 12 (E) (railroad gun)
- 21 cm Mörser 16
- 21 cm Mörser 18
- 21 cm Kanone 38 – 1 cannon sent to Japan, 7 used domestically
- 21 cm Kanone 39
- 22-cm-Mörser (p) – captured from Poland and Yugoslavia
- 24 cm Haubitze 39
- 24 cm Kanone 3
- 24 cm Kanone 4 (prototype only)
- 24 cm Theodor Bruno Kanone (E) (railroad gun)
  - 24 cm Theodor Kanone (E)
- 24 cm Kanone M. 16 – bought from Czechs in 1938
- 28 cm Haubitze L/12
- Mortier de 280 modèle 1914 Schneider – captured from France
- 28 cm schwere Bruno Kanone (E)
- Krupp K5 (28 cm railroad gun)
- 35.5 cm Haubitze M1
- 38 cm Siegfried K (E) (coastal defense, railroad gun)
- 38 cm SK C/34 naval gun (coastal defense)
- 40.6 cm SK C/34 gun (coastal defense)
- 42 cm Gamma Mörser
- 42 cm Haubitze M. 14/16
- Schwerer Gustav (80 cm siege guns)

=== Anti-tank guns ===
- 25mm Puteaux anti-tank gun model 1937 (captured from French)
- 25 mm Hotchkiss anti-tank gun (captured from British)
- 2.8 cm sPzB 41
- PaK 36 (37mm)
- 3.7 cm kanon PÚV vz. 34
- Bofors 37 mm (M1934/36) – captured from Danish, Polish and British forcers
- 4.2 cm Pak 41
- 45 mm anti-tank gun M1937 (53-K) (Captured from Russia by Wehrmacht and redesignated Pak 184(r))
- 47 mm APX anti-tank gun (captured from French)
- 47mm Schneider anti-tank gun model 1936 (captured from French)
- M35 Bohler and Breda 47mm guns of unclear origin
- Austrian 4.7 cm IG 35/36
- 47 mm kanon P.U.V. vz. 36 (German designation 4.7 cm Pak(t))
- Cannone da 47/32 (German designation Pak 35/36(ö))
- 45 mm anti-tank gun M1932 (19-K) – (German designation 4.5 cm Pak 184(r) and 4.5 cm Pak 184/6(r))
- 5 cm Pak 38
- 57 mm anti-tank gun M1943 (ZiS-2) (Captured from Russia by Wehrmacht and redesignated Pak 208(r))
- 7.5 cm Pak 39
- 7.5 cm Pak 40
- 7.5 cm Pak 41
- 7.5 cm Pak 97/38 (also known as PaK 97/38) – modernized French gun of 1897
- 7.62 cm Pak 36(r) (conversion of Russian 76 mm divisional gun M1936 (F-22))
- 8 cm PAW 600
  - Panzerwurfkanone 10H64
- Thor's Hammer/Panzertod (105mm recoilless gun firing 81.4mm subcaliber projectile)
- 8.8 cm Raketenwerfer 43 (rocket artillery, also known as "Püppchen")
- 8.8 cm Flak 18/36/37/41 AT/AA gun
  - 8.8 cm Pak 43 – most-produced heavy ATG
- Cannone da 90/53 AA/AT gun (acquired from Italy)
- 12.8 cm Pak 44

== Anti-tank weapons (besides anti-tank guns) ==
- Wz. 35 anti-tank rifle (PzB 35) – captured from Poland
- Panzerbüchse 39 (PzB 38/39)
  - Granatbüchse 39
- Panzerschreck (also known as Raketenpanzerbüchse 43/54)
- Solothurn S-18/1000
  - Solothurn S-18/1100
- Panzerfaust anti-tank recoilless grenade launcher

== Anti-aircraft weapons ==
=== Light anti-aircraft guns ===
- Fliegerfaust hand-held anti-air rocket launcher
- 2 cm Flak 30/38/Flakvierling – the most produced German artillery piece of World War II, based on Russian 2-K AA gun design which was too complex to mass-produce in USSR
  - Gebirgsflak 38 – reduced-weight version of 2 cm Flak 30/38/Flakvierling
- Cannone-Mitragliera da 20/77 (Scotti)
- 25 mm Hotchkiss anti-aircraft gun (captured from French)
- 3 cm MK 303 Flak
- 3.7 cm Flak 18/36/37/43
- 3.7 cm SK C/30 – naval AA gun
  - 3.7 cm FlaK 43
- 37 mm automatic air defense gun M1939 (61-K) (captured from Russia by Wehrmacht and redesignated 3.7 cm M39(r))
- 5 cm FlaK 41
- Schräge Musik – also independently developed by Imperial Japanese Naval Air Service (both in use by May 1943)
  - Jagdfaust – air-to-air vertical-fire automated cannon
  - SG 116
- Henschel Hs 297 – launch 35 73mm-caliber short-range rockets
- Solothurn ST-5 caliber 20 mm (.79 in)

=== Heavy anti-aircraft guns ===
- Rheintochter (surface-to-air rocket)
- Cannone da 75/46 C.A. modello 34 (acquired from Italy)
- 76 mm air defense gun M1938 (captured from Russia by Wehrmacht and redesignated Flak 38(r))
- 85 mm air defense gun M1939 (52-K) (captured from Russia by Wehrmacht and redesignated 8.5 cm Flak 39(r))
- 8.8 cm Flak 18/36/37/41 AT/AA gun
- Cannone da 90/53 AA/AT gun (acquired from Italy)
- 10.5 cm FlaK 38
- 12.8 cm FlaK 40
- 12.8 cm FlaK 40 twin mount

== Vehicles ==
Nazi Germany had captured many models of foreign equipment. In the list below, only most prominent captured models are listed. For full listing of captured vehicles see List of foreign vehicles used by Nazi Germany in World War II

=== Tankette ===
- AMR 35 – captured from French, some converted to mortar carrier

=== Tanks ===
Image	Name/designation	Type	Origin	Manufacturer/s	Main armament	Secondary armament	From (year)	Estimated wartime quantity	Mass (t)	Notes
	Stridsvagn L-5	Light tank	Sweden	AB Landsverk	37mm cannon	2 x 7.92mm MG 13 light machine guns	1929	5	7	Incomplete prototype
	Leichttraktor	Light tank	Weimar Republic	Krupp, Rheinmetall	3.7 cm KwK L/45	7.92×57mm Mauser Dreyse machine gun, cloth belt drum magazine (100 rounds) supply	1930	4	8.7 (Krupp); 8.96 (Rheinmetall)	Used for training only
	Grosstraktor	Medium Tank	Weimar Republic	Krupp, Rheinmetall, Daimler	75 mm KwK	3× 7.92 mm MG (coaxial, hull and sub-turret)	1929	6	16 (Rheinmetall, Daimler); 16.4 (Krupp)	Used for training only
	Panzer I	Light tank	Nazi Germany	Krupp, Henschel, Daimler, MAN	2 × 7.92 mm MG 13 machine guns	-	1934	1659	5.4	
	Panzer II	Light tank	Nazi Germany		1 × 2 cm KwK 30 L/55 Ausf. a–F; 1 × 2 cm KwK 38 L/55 Ausf. J–L	1 × 7.92 mm Maschinengewehr 34	1936	1,856	8.9	
	Škoda T-15	Light tank	Slovakia	Škoda	1 × 3.7 cm KwK 38(t) L/47	1 × 7.92 mm Maschinengewehr 34	1936	5	-	Slovak alternative to the Panzer II. 5 prototypes built
	Panzerkampfwagen II mit Schwimmkörper (Panzer II with floats)	Light tank	Nazi Germany		1 × 2 cm KwK 30 L/55 Ausf. a–F; 1 × 2 cm KwK 38 L/55 Ausf. J–L	1 × 7.92 mm Maschinengewehr 34	1936		8.9	
	VK 16.02 Leopard	Light tank	Nazi Germany	MAN, MIAG, Daimler	5 cm KwK 39 (planned)	1 × 7.92 mm Maschinengewehr 34		0	21.9	
	Neubaufahrzeug	Medium Tank	Nazi Germany	Krupp, Rheinmetall	7.5 cm KwK 37	3.7 cm KwK 36; 3 × 7.92 mm Maschinengewehr 34	1935	5	23.41	
	Panzer 35(t)	Light tank	Czechoslovakia	Škoda, ČKD	3.7 cm (1.5 in) KwK 34(t) gun	2 x 7.92 mm (0.3 in) MG 37(t) machine gun	1936	434	10.5	
	Panzer 38(t)	Light tank	Czechoslovakia	ČKD	37 mm KwK 38(t) L/47.8	2× 7.92 mm ZB-53 (MG 37(t)) machine guns	1939	1414	9.85	
	Sd.Kfz. 140/1 Aufklärungspanzer 38(t) mit 2 cm KwK 38	Light tank	Czechoslovakia	ČKD	37 mm KwK 38(t) L/47.8	2× 7.92 mm ZB-53 (MG 37(t)) machine guns	1939		9.85	
	Sd.Kfz. 140/1 Aufklärungspanzer 38(t) mit 7.5 cm KwK37 L/24	Light tank	Czechoslovakia	ČKD	37 mm KwK 38(t) L/47.8	2× 7.92 mm ZB-53 (MG 37(t)) machine guns	1939		9.85	
	Panzer III	Medium Tank	Nazi Germany	Daimler	1 × 3.7 cm KwK 36 Ausf. A-G; 1 × 5 cm KwK 38 Ausf. F-J; 1 × 5 cm KwK 39 Ausf. J¹-M; 1 × 7.5 cm KwK 37 Ausf. N	2–3 × 7.92 mm Maschinengewehr 34	1939	5774	23.0	
	Panzerbeobachtungswagen III	Medium Tank	Nazi Germany	Daimler	1 × 3.7 cm KwK 36 Ausf. A-G; 1 × 5 cm KwK 38 Ausf. F-J; 1 × 5 cm KwK 39 Ausf. J¹-M; 1 × 7.5 cm KwK 37 Ausf. N	2–3 × 7.92 mm Maschinengewehr 34	1939		23.0	Used for forward artillery observation
	Tauchpanzer III – amphibious (snorkel-fitted) Panzer III	Medium Tank	Nazi Germany	Daimler	1 × 3.7 cm KwK 36 Ausf. A-G; 1 × 5 cm KwK 38 Ausf. F-J; 1 × 5 cm KwK 39 Ausf. J¹-M; 1 × 7.5 cm KwK 37 Ausf. N	2–3 × 7.92 mm Maschinengewehr 34	1939		23.0	Converted to amphibious tank
	Panzer IV	Medium Tank	Nazi Germany	Krupp, Vomag, Nibelungenwerk	1 x 7.5 cm (2.95 in) KwK 40 L/48 main gun	2 × 7.92 mm Maschinengewehr 34	1939	8553	25.0	
	Panzerbeobachtungswagen IV (Pz. Beob. Wg. IV)	Medium Tank	Nazi Germany	Krupp, Vomag, Nibelungenwerk	1 x 7.5 cm (2.95 in) KwK 40 L/48 main gun	2 × 7.92 mm Maschinengewehr 34	1939		25.0	Artillery spotter tank with special radio equipment
	Panther	Medium Tank	Nazi Germany	MAN AG, Daimler, MNH	1 x 7.5 cm KwK 42 L/70	2 × 7.92 mm Maschinengewehr 34	1943	6000	44.8	
	Beobachtungspanzer Panther – artillery observer	Medium Tank	Nazi Germany	MAN AG, Daimler, MNH	1 x 7.5 cm KwK 42 L/70	2 × 7.92 mm Maschinengewehr 34	1943		44.8	Used for forward artillery observation
	Tiger I	Heavy Tank	Nazi Germany	Henschel	1× 8.8 cm KwK 36 L/56; 92 AP and HE rounds	2× 7.92 mm MG 34	1942	1347	54.0	
	Tiger II	Heavy Tank	Nazi Germany	Henschel, Krupp	1× 8.8 cm KwK 43	2× 7.92 mm MG 34	1944	492	69.8	

=== Self-propelled guns ===
==== Tank-based ====
Anti-Air

- Flakpanzer I
- Flakpanzer 38(t)
- Möbelwagen
- Wirbelwind
- Ostwind
- Flakpanzer IV mit 3 cm FlaK Vierling (official designator for Zerstörer 45)
- Kugelblitz
- Flakpanzer Coelian (dual 3.7 cm autocannons)

Anti-tank

- Panzerjäger I
- 5 cm PaK 38 auf Fahrgestell Panzerkampfwagen II
- 7.62 cm PaK 36(r) auf Fahrgestell Panzerkampfwagen II Ausf. D/E (Sd.Kfz. 132)
- Marder I (Sd.Kfz. 135)
- Marder II (LaS 762)
- Marder III (Sd.Kfz. 138)
- Marder III (Sd.Kfz. 139)
- Jagdpanzer 38(t) (Hetzer)
- Jagdpanzer IV
- Panzer IV/70 – Panzer IV-based SPG armed with 75mm gun from Panther tank
- Jagdpanther (Sd.Kfz. 173)
- Nashorn (Hornisse)
- Jagdtiger (Sd.Kfz. 186)
- Elefant also known as Ferdinand (Sd.Kfz. 184))

Assault & infantry guns

- Sturmpanzer I (Bison)
- Sturmgeschütz III (StuG III or StuH 42, StuG III most-produced German AFV)
- Sturmgeschütz IV (StuG IV)
- Sturm-Infanteriegeschütz 33B
- Brummbär also known as Sturmpanzer, Sturmpanzer 43 (Sd.Kfz. 166)
- Grille (Sd.Kfz. 138/1)
- 15 cm sIG 33 auf Fahrgestell Panzerkampfwagen II (Sf)
- Sturmtiger

Self propelled artillery

- Wespe
- Hummel
- Heuschrecke 10 also known as "Waffenträger Geschützwagen IV")
- 10.5 cm K (gp.Sfl.) (Dicker Max)
- Sturer Emil (2 built)

==== Other ====
- Schlepper 25PS – 37mm gun on Hanomag chassis
- 7.7 cm FK WD Schlepper 50PS – 77mm gun on Hanomag chassis
- Pz.Sph. 204(f) mit KwK 42 – gun on French Panhard 178 armoured car
- 8.8 cm Flak 18 auf Zgkw 12 – AA gun in field gun mount on Sd.Kfz. 8 half-track chassis
- 8.8 cm Flak 18 auf Zgkw 18 – AA gun in field gun mount on Sd.Kfz. 9 half-track chassis
- Mittler Schutzenpanzerwagen S307(f) mit Reihenwerfer – mortar on French SOMUA MCG half-track truck chassis

=== Armored cars ===
- Panzerspähwagen Kfz 13
- Leichter Panzerspähwagen (light armored cars)
  - Sd.Kfz. 221
  - Sd.Kfz. 222
  - Sd.Kfz. 223
  - Sd.Kfz. 260 (light armored radio car)
  - Sd.Kfz. 261 (light armored radio car)
- Schwerer Panzerspähwagen (heavy armored cars)
  - Sd.Kfz. 231
  - Sd.Kfz. 232
  - Sd.Kfz. 233
  - Sd.Kfz. 263 (heavy armored radio car)
- Sd.Kfz. 234 – 8 wheeled armored car (also known as Puma or Stummel)
- Sd.Kfz. 250 half-track (machine gun and mortar versions)
- Sd.Kfz. 251 half-track (machine gun and mortar versions)
- Panzerwagen ADGZ
- M39 Pantserwagen (captured from Dutch)
- Panhard 178 (captured from French)

=== Armored carriers ===
- Sd.Kfz. 3 (early) – unarmed personnel carrier of the 1920s
- French Somua MCG/MCL mittlerer gepanzerter Zugkraftwagen S307/303(f)
- French Unic P107 leichter Zugkraftwagen U304(f))
- Gepanzerter Mannschaftstransportwagen 'Kätzchen' – 2 built
- Munitions Selbstfahrlafette auf Fahrgestell Panzerkampfwagen II (Wespe chassis as ammunition carrier)
- Munitionspanzer 38(t) (sf) Ausf.K (Sd.Kfz..138/1)
- Sd.Kfz. 252 half-track ammunition carrier
- Borgward B III – armoured ammunition carrier

=== Engineering and command ===
- Springer vehicle (demolition vehicle)
- Borgward IV (demolition vehicle)
- Goliath tracked mine
- Räumer S (mine clearance vehicle, prototype only)
- Brückenleger auf Panzerkampfwagen II (bridge layer on Panzer II chassis)
- Minenräumer III (also known as Minenräumpanzer III) – mine-clearing vehicle on Panzer III chassis
- Kleiner Panzerbefehlswagen (command version of Panzer I)
- Panzerbefehlswagen III (command version of Panzer III)
- Panzerbefehlswagen IV (Pz. Bef. Wg. IV) (command version of Panzer IV)
- Befehlspanzer Panther (command version of Panther tank)
- Kugelpanzer – cable-laying vehicle, supplied to Japan
- Sd.Kfz. 247 – armored command car
- Sd.Kfz. 253 half-track artillery observer
- Infanterie Sturmsteg auf Fahrgestell Panzerkampfwagen IV (infantry assault bridge version of the Panzer IV)
- Instandsetzungskraftwagen I (maintenance vehicle version of the Panzer I)
- Strabokran – tank-lifting maintenance crane

=== Trucks ===
- Opel Blitz (also Maultier (late Sd.Kfz. 3) half-track versions)
- Mercedes-Benz L3000
- Krupp Protze
  - Kfz.19 – Telephone truck
  - Kfz.21 – Staff car
  - Kfz.68 – Radio mast carrier
  - Kfz.69 – Standard configuration for towing the 3,7 cm PaK 36
  - Kfz.70 – Standard configuration for personnel carrying
  - Kfz.81 – Ammo carrier conversion for 2 cm FlaK gun, usually towed
  - Kfz.83 – Generator carrier for anti-aircraft spotlight, usually towed
- Borgward B 3000
- Sd.Kfz. 4 half-track
- Ford B3000 S, V3000S, V3000A
- Ford Modell BB
- Ford Modell V8-51
- Polski Fiat 621–Captured from Polish
- FIAT 626–Captured from Italians after the 1943 armistice
- Tatra 111
- Zis-5–Captured from Soviets
- Citroën U23–Captured from French

=== Passenger cars ===
- Volkswagen Kübelwagen
- Volkswagen Schwimmwagen – amphibious car
- Einheits-PKW der Wehrmacht
  - BMW 325 (lightweight class)
  - Horch 901 (medium weight class)
- Mercedes-Benz W 133 III
- Mercedes-Benz W 139
- Mercedes-Benz W 152
- Mercedes-Benz W31
- Tatra V 809
- Trippel SG6 amphibious car

=== Motorcycles ===
Motorcycles were often paired with a sidecar as a Wehrmachtsgespann.

- BMW R75
- Zündapp KS 750
- BMW R 17
- BMW R 71
- Zündapp DB/ DBK
- Zündapp KS 600
- Zündapp K 800
- NSU
- DKW NZ 350
- Nimbus (motorcycle) – Denmark-built

=== Tractors and prime movers ===
- Landwasserschlepper (also known as Land-Wasser-Schlepper) amphibious tractor
- Schwerer Wehrmachtschlepper, also AA and multiple-rocket launcher versions do exist.
- Sd.Kfz. 2 (HK 101) – lightest German tractor of World War II (half-track and motorcycle hybrid)
- Maultier half-truck
- Sd.Kfz. 4 half-track
- Sd.Kfz. 6 half-track
- Sd.Kfz. 7 half-track
- Sd.Kfz. 8 half-track
- Sd.Kfz. 9 half-track
- Sd.Kfz. 10 light half-track
- Sd.Kfz. 11 half-track
- Bergepanzer III – PzKpfw III chassis
- Bergepanzer IV – PzKpfw IV chassis
- Bergepanther (Sd.Kfz. 179) – PzKpfw V Panther chassis 347 produced (1943–1945)
- Bergetiger – PzKpfw VI Tiger I chassis
- Bergepanzer 38(t) – Jagdpanzer 38 chassis, 170 produced (1944–1945)
- Bergepanzer T-34 – Captured T-34 chassis
- Sd.Kfz. 254 tracked artillery tractor
- Raupenschlepper, Ost (also known as RSO) – advanced tracked tractor
- Saurer RR-7

=== Miscellaneous vehicles ===
- Heeresfeldwagen – Army trailer
- Infanteriefahrzeug – Infantry trailers
- Infanteriekarren IF8 – Infantry cart IF8
- Meillerwagen – V-2 rocket transporter
- Einheitsprotzhaken – Trailer attachment hook
- Railroad plough

== Navy ships and war vessels ==
- Siebel ferry – main Wehrmacht landing craft

== Secret weapons ==
- V-1 flying bomb
- V-2
- V3 cannon
- Panzer VIII Maus

== Radars ==
- Freya radar
- Egon
- Würzburg radar
- FuG 25a Erstling
- Seetakt radar
- Flensburg radar detector

== Missiles and bombs ==
- Anti-tank bombs
  - SD 4 HL
  - SD 4/HL RS
  - SD 9/HL
- Armor-piercing bombs
  - SC 10
  - SC 10 DW
  - PC 500 'Pauline'
  - PC 1000 'Pol'
  - PC 1600
  - PC 500 RS
  - PC 1000 RS
  - PC 1800 RS
  - PD 500
  - PD 1000
- Cluster bombs
  - AB 23
  - AB 250-2
  - AB 250-3
  - AB 500-1
  - AB 500-1B
  - AB 500-3A
  - AB 70-D1
  - BDC 10
- High explosive bombs
  - SB 1000
  - SB 1800
  - SB 2500
  - SC 50
  - SC 250
  - SC 500
  - SC 1000 "Hermann"
  - SC 1200
  - SC 1800 "Satan"
  - SC 2000
  - SC 2500 "Max"
- Shrapnel bombs
  - SD 1
  - SD 1 FRZ
  - SD 2
  - SD 10 A
  - SD 10 FRZ
  - SD 10 C
  - SD 15
  - SBe 50
  - SD 50
  - SD 70
  - SBe 250
  - SD 250
  - SD 500
  - SD 1400 "Esau"
  - SD 1700 "Sigismund"
- Rockets and Missiles
  - R4M (AA/AT rocket)
  - Werfer-Granate 21 (air-to-air rocket)
  - Blohm & Voss L 10 unmanned torpedo glider
  - Fritz X anti-ship guided bomb (also known as PC 1400)
  - Henschel Hs 293 anti-ship guided bomb
  - Henschel Hs 294 anti-ship guided bomb
  - Henschel Hs 298 radio-guided air-to-air missile
  - Ruhrstahl X-4 wire-guided air-to-air missile
  - Kramer Rk 344, air-to-air missile (rocket-powered)

== Cartridges and shells ==
- Panzergranate 39
- 9×19mm Parabellum
- 7.92×57mm Mauser
- 7.92×94mm Patronen (used for Panzerbüchse 39 rifle)
- 7.92×107mm DS (used for wz. 35 anti-tank rifle)
- 7.92×33mm Kurz
- 7.65×17mm SR Browning (.32 ACP)
- 12 Gauge (used for M30 Luftwaffe Drilling)
- 9.3×74mmR (used for M30 Luftwaffe Drilling)
- 7.63×25mm Mauser
- 7.62×54mmR (Captured)
- 7.62×25mm Tokarev (Captured)
- .30 Carbine (Captured)
- .30-06 Springfield (Captured)
- .45 ACP (Captured)
- .303 British (Captured)
- .38 S&W (Captured)
- .55 Boys (Captured)

== See also ==
- List of Sd.Kfz. designations
- List of World War II firearms of Germany
- German designations of foreign artillery in World War II
- German designations of foreign firearms in World War II
- Uniforms of the German Army (1935–1945)
