= List of recoilless rifles =

This is a list of recoilless rifles (RCLs) intended to catalogue these lightweight infantry support weapons that allow the firing of a heavier projectile than would be practical with a recoiling artillery gun. Technically, only devices that use a rifled barrel are recoilless rifles. The smoothbore variants (those devoid of rifling) are termed recoilless guns. This distinction is often lost, and both are often called recoilless rifles.

Normally used for anti-tank roles, the first effective system of this kind was developed during World War II to provide infantry with a light, cheap and easily deployable weapon that does not require extensive training in gunnery. The near complete lack of recoil allows some versions to be shoulder-fired, but the majority are mounted on light tripods and are intended to be easily carried by a soldier.

Symbol	SS	SA	RE	RCL	AT	ACN
Meaning	Single shot	Semi-automatic	Revolver	Recoilless rifle	Anti-tank	Autocannon

Name	Manufacturer	Image	Cartridge	Type	Country	Year	Source
Rheinmetall RMK30	Mauser		30x250 mm	RE; ACN	Germany	1993	
M18 Recoilless Rifle			57 mm	SS; RCL	United States	1942	
SPG-9			73 mm (2.87 in) smoothbore	SS; AT	Soviet Union	1962	
Miniman	FFV Ordnance		74 mm	SS; AT	Sweden	1968	
LG 40	Rheinmetall		75×130 mm. R 75×200 mm. R	SS; RCL	Nazi Germany	1941	
M20			75 mm	SS; RCL	United States	1944	
Breda Folgore	Breda Meccanica Bresciana		80 mm (3.1 in) HEAT	SS; AT	Italy	1986	
DZJ-08	Norinco		80 mm	SS; AT	China	2008	
B-10	KBM		82 mm	SS; RCL	Soviet Union	1954	
M59	Skoda		82 mm		Czechoslovakia	1959	
ALAC	GESPI Aeronáutica		84 mm Thermobaric	SS; AT	Brazil	2014	
AT4	Saab Bofors Dynamics		84 mm	SS; AT	Sweden	1987	
Carl Gustav recoilless rifle	Saab Bofors Dynamics		84 mm	SS; AT	Sweden	1946	
55 S 55	FDF Vammaskoski factory		55 mm	SS; AT	Finland	1955	
RCL 3.45 inch Gun	Broadway Trust Company		3.45 in (88 mm)	SS; RCL	United Kingdom		
M67			3.54 in (90 mm)	SS; RCL	United States	1960s	
Pvpj 1110	Saab Bofors Dynamics		90x760 mm HEAT	SS; RCL	Sweden	1953	
95 S 58-61			95 mm	SS; RCL	Finland	1958	
LG 40	Krupp		105×155 mm. R	SS; RCL	Nazi Germany	1942	
LG 42	Rheinmetall		105×155 mm. R	SS; RCL	Nazi Germany	1942	
M40	Watervliet Arsenal		105×607 mmR	SS; RCL	United States	1950s	
Model 1968 recoilless gun	Fabricaciones Militares		105 mm	SS; RCL	Argentina	1968	
B-11	KBM		107 mm	SS; RCL	Soviet Union	1954	
L6 Wombat			120 mm (4.7 in) HESH	SS; RCL	United Kingdom	1950s	
M-60			82mm HEAT	SS; RCL	Yugoslavia	1960s	
Jagdfaust				SA; RCL	Nazi Germany		
M28/M29 "Davy Crockett" Nuclear Recoilless Rifle				SS; RCL	United States	1956	
