= Stielgranate 42 =

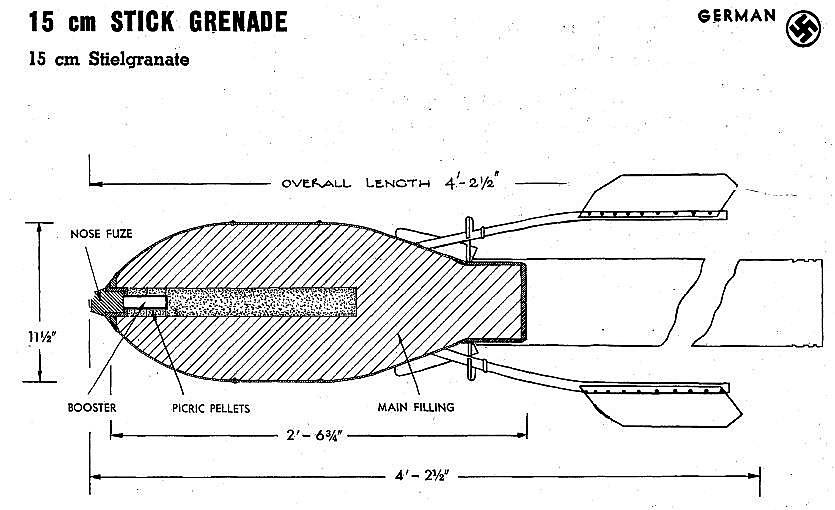
- Type: Demolition charge
- Place of origin: Nazi Germany

Service history
- Used by: Wehrmacht
- Wars: World War II

Production history
- Produced: 1942-1943
- No. built: 87,200?

Specifications
- Mass: 90 kg (198 lb 7 oz)
- Length: Complete: 1.27 m (4 ft 2 in); Body: 0.76 m (2 ft 6 in)
- Diameter: 30 cm (12 in)
- Effective firing range: 300 m (330 yd)
- Maximum firing range: 1,000 m (1,100 yd)
- Filling: Amatol
- Filling weight: 54 kg (119 lb)
- Detonation mechanism: WgrZ.36 impact fuze

The Stielgranate 42 was a German fin-stabilized demolition charge, used with the 15 cm SIG 33 heavy infantry gun and armored vehicles armed with the SIG 33 during World War II. The primary purpose of the Stielgranate 42 was the demolition of concrete fortifications and for the clearing of minefields and barbed wire. Unlike the Stielgranate 41 it was not a shaped charge anti-tank weapon. In an emergency, the Stielgranate 42 could be used in an anti-tank role to great effect but due to its short range and poor accuracy the gun crew would be dangerously exposed to enemy fire.

== Design ==
The Stielgranate 42 was of welded steel construction, consisting of three main parts: the nose cone, a cylindrical body, and a tapered tail with fins. Both the nose and the base of the projectile were reinforced with steel rings welded to the casing. The nose ring is threaded to accept a WgrZ.36 impact fuze also used by the 20 cm (7.9 in) leichter Ladungswerfer. A 51 mm (2 in) booster charge made up of compressed TNT pellets is located in the center of a tube of picric acid pellets. The complete projectile weighs 90 kg (198 lb 7 oz) and is filled with 54 kg (119 lb) of amatol. A stick which fits over the base of the projectile is placed in the gun barrel and the projectile is then propelled by a 5.5 kg (12 lb 2 oz) charge. After approximately 140 m (150 yd) the stick falls away and the projectile continues on its course. The tail consists of six small fins in pairs at the base of the projectile with three steel bars with larger fins in between the small fins. The fins were angled to impart spin to help stabilize the projectile.
