= 10.5 cm Leichtgeschütz 42 =

WW2 German recoilless gun

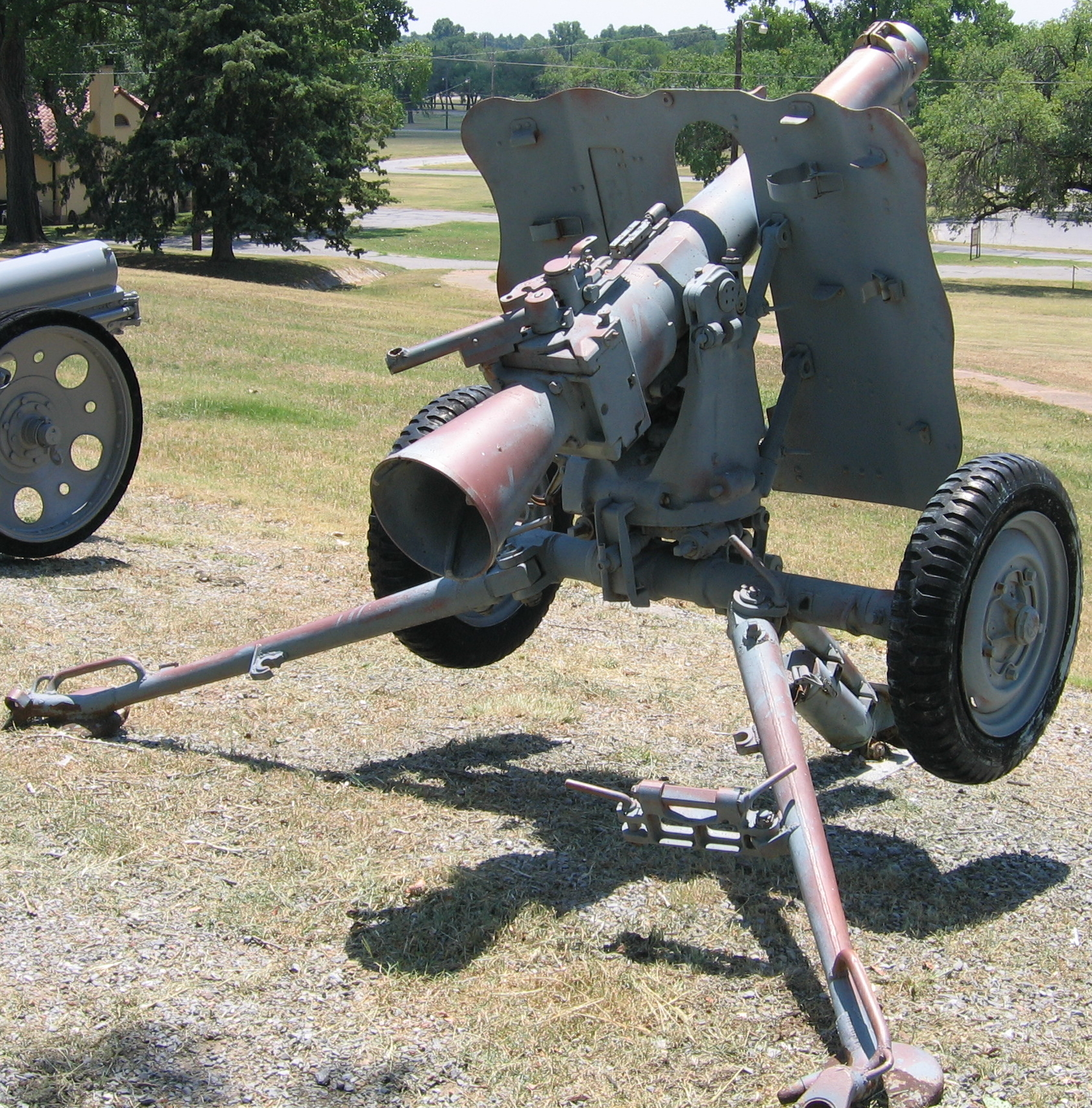
- Rear view of the LG 42
- Type: Recoilless gun
- Place of origin: Nazi Germany

Service history
- In service: 1942–45
- Used by: Nazi Germany
- Wars: World War II

Production history
- Manufacturer: Rheinmetall
- Produced: 1942–44
- Variants: LG 42-1, LG 42-2

Specifications
- Mass: 540 kg (1,190 lbs); LG 42-1; 552 kg (1,217 lbs); LG 42-2
- Length: 1.836 m (6 ft)
- Barrel length: 1.374 m (4 ft 6 in)
- Shell: 105×155 mm. R
- Shell weight: 14.8 kg (32 lb 10 oz)
- Caliber: 105 mm (4.13 in)
- Breech: horizontal sliding block
- Elevation: -15° to +42° 30'
- Traverse: 360° below 20° elevation 71° 15' above 20° elevation
- Muzzle velocity: 195 m/s (640 ft/s) or 335 m/s (1,099 ft/s)
- Effective firing range: 3,400 m (3,718 yds) with Kleine Ladung
- Maximum firing range: 7,950 m (8,695 yds) with Grosse Ladung

The 10.5 cm Leichtgeschütz 42, commonly the LG 42, was a German recoilless gun manufactured by Rheinmetall and used during World War II.

== History ==
The development history of the LG 42 is not clear, but it seems obvious that the success of the company's 7.5 cm LG 40 during the Battle of Crete in 1941 spurred the Germans to continue development of recoilless guns in larger calibers. Krupp seems to have gotten its 10.5 cm LG 40 into service first, but the Rheinmetall LG 42 was apparently manufactured in larger quantities.

== Design specifics ==
The LG 42 was basically an enlarged and improved version of the 7.5 cm LG 40. It incorporated torque vanes in the jet nozzle to counteract the torque forces imparted by the round engaging the rifling and any clogged or eroded nozzles. It also used the improved priming mechanism developed after the problems with the smaller weapon became apparent. Like all the German 10.5 cm recoilless rifles it shared shells with the 10.5 cm leFH 18 (light Field Howitzer). The LG 42-1 version was built using light alloys in parts of the carriage, but the LG 42-2 replaced these with ordinary steel as light alloys became too valuable later in the war. Both versions could be broken down into 4 loads for parachute operations.

== Operational use ==
Both 105 mm recoilless guns, unlike the 75 mm LG 40, equipped independent artillery batteries and battalions. These include Batteries 423–426, 429, 433, and 443, most of which were later incorporated into Leichtgeschütze-Abt. (Light Gun Battalion) 423 and 424. These units served in both the Arctic under 20th Mountain Army and in central Russia under Heeresgruppe Mitte (Army Group Center).
