= 38 cm schwerer Ladungswerfer =

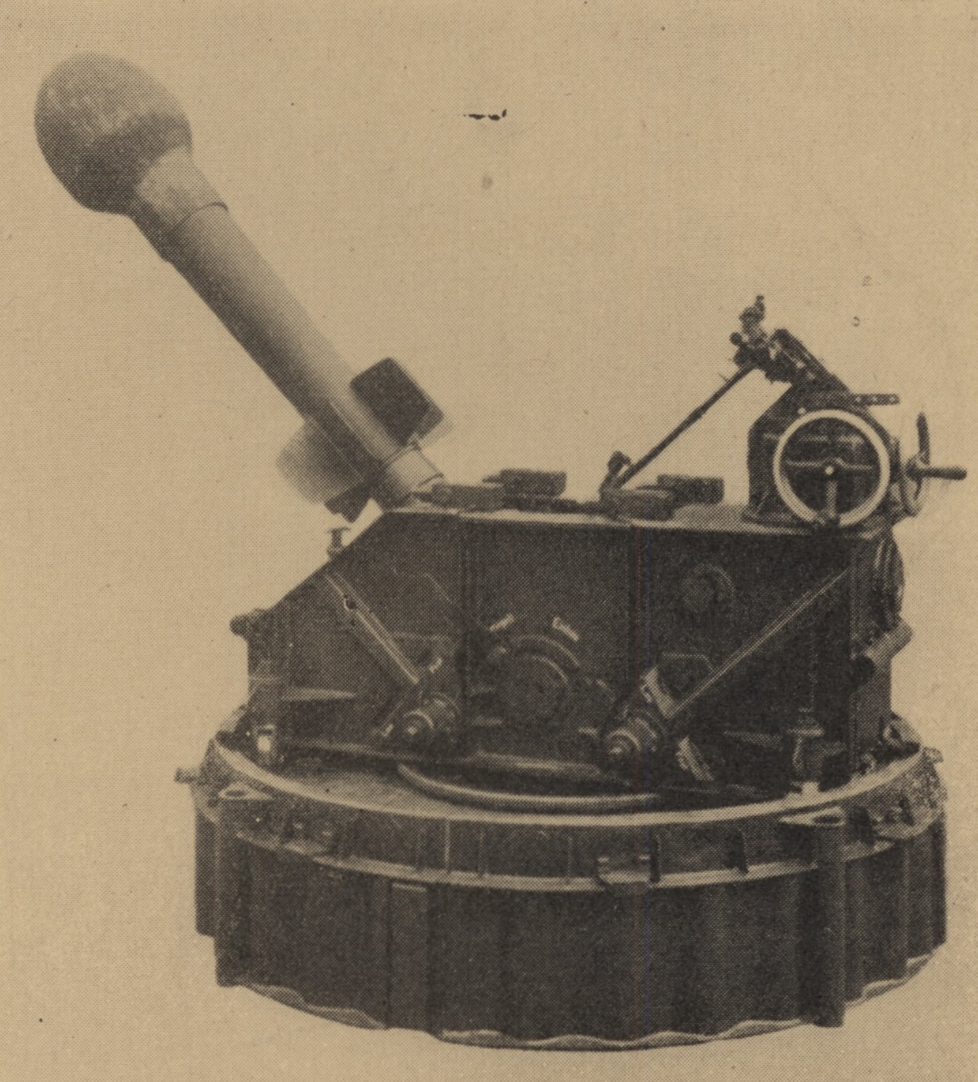
- Type: Spigot Mortar
- Place of origin: Nazi Germany

Service history
- Used by: Nazi Germany
- Wars: Second World War

Production history
- Designer: Rheinmetall

Specifications
- Mass: 1,600 kg (3,500 lb)
- Barrel length: 168 cm (5 ft 6 in)
- Diameter: 38 cm (1 ft 3 in)
- Shell: 149 kilograms (328 lb)
- Caliber: 169 millimetres (6.7 in) (spigot diameter)
- Elevation: 37° to 85°
- Traverse: 360°
- Maximum firing range: 1,000 m (1,100 yd)
- Filling weight: 110 pounds (50 kg)

The 38 cm schwerer Ladungswerfer (38 cm sLdgW) was a spigot mortar used by Germany during World War II, as an upgrade to the 20 cm leichter Ladungswerfer. It was used by engineers to demolish obstacles and strongpoints, firing the 149 kg 38-cm Wurfgranate 40 up to 1,000 m, as well as smoke shells. At 1,658 kg and with disassembly requiring nine loads, it proved to be too heavy for its role and it was gradually withdrawn from front-line service.

== Bibliography ==
- Gander, Terry and Chamberlain, Peter. Weapons of the Third Reich: An Encyclopedic Survey of All Small Arms, Artillery and Special Weapons of the German Land Forces 1939-1945. New York: Doubleday, 1979 ISBN 0-385-15090-3
