= Strategic defence =

Type of military planning doctrine

Strategic defence is a type of military planning doctrine and a set defense and/or combat activities used for the purpose of deterring, resisting, and repelling a strategic offensive, conducted as either a territorial or airspace, invasion or attack; or as part of a cyberspace attack in cyberwarfare; or a naval offensive to interrupt shipping lane traffic as a form of economic warfare.

Strategic defense is not always passive in nature. In fact, it often involves military deception, propaganda and psychological warfare, as well as pre-emptive strategies. All forms of military defense are included in the planning, and often civil defense organisations are also included.

In military theory, strategic defense thinking seeks to understand and appreciate the theoretical and historical background to any given war or conflict scenario facing the decision-makers at the highest level. Therefore, to fully understand strategic defense activities, analysts need to have a detailed understanding of the relevant geopolitical and socioeconomic challenges and issues that faced the nation state or large organization being studied.

Some of the more common issues encountered by strategic defense planners include:

- Problems of security and confidence-building in interstate relationships in the strategic neighbourhood
- National defense policy
- Arms proliferation and arms control in the immediate strategic region, or within reach of the weapon systems in question
- Policy advice to the higher levels of the national defense organisation
- The strategic implications of developments in the nation's geographic region
- Reviewing security agenda and formulating a new one if necessary

Strategic defense is also a predominant peacetime posture of most nation-states in the world at any given time. Although national military intelligence services are always conducting operations to discover offensive threats to security to ensure adequate warning is provided to bring defense forces to a state of combat readiness.

In terms of combat scale, a strategic defensive is considered a war that can last from days to generations or a military campaign as a phase of the war, involving a series of operations delimited by time and space and with specific major achievable goals allocated to a defined part of the available armed force. As a campaign, a strategic defence may consist of several battles, some of which may be offensive in nature, or may result in the conduct of withdrawals to new positions, encirclements, or sieges by the defender or the attacker as a means of securing strategic initiative.

The strategic goal of a strategic defensive may require a conduct of an offensive operation far removed from the main national territory, such as the case with the 1982 Falklands campaign, which sets logistics apart as the dominant consideration in strategic defensive as a doctrine.

== See also ==
- Defence in depth
- Strategic depth

== Sources ==
- Dupuy, Trevor N., Understanding War: Military History And The Theory Of Combat, Leo Cooper, New York, 1986
- Thompson, Julian, Lifeblood of war: logistics in armed conflict, Brassey's Classics, London, 1991

== Recommended reading ==
- The Adelphi Papers, Volume 359, Number 1, August 1, 2003 Stephen J. Lukasik; S.E. Goodman; D.W. Longhurst, Chapter 2: Strategic Defence Options, pp. 15–24(10)
