= Panzer stab 43 =

Anti-tank mine

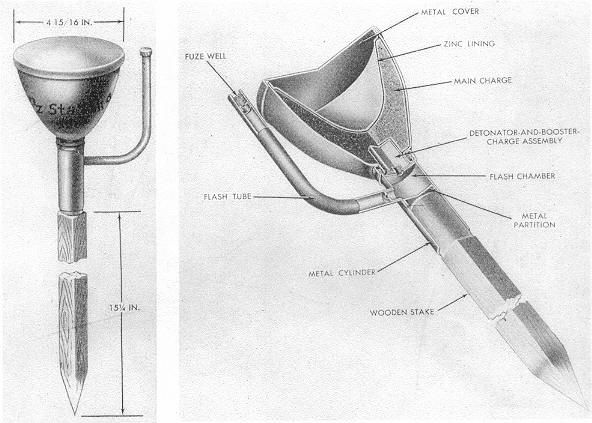
Cross-section drawing of the mine

The Panzer-Stabmine 43 was a German anti-tank mine, together with the Hohl-Sprung mine 4672 it was the first mine to combine a shaped charge warhead with a tilt-rod fuze. The mine was developed during the Second World War. The mine consisted of a wine glass shaped metal main body mounted on a wooden post, with a tilt rod holding arm projecting to one side. It used a 125 mm diameter warhead with 1.6 kg of explosive, and a combination pressure/tilt fuze.

At a stand-off distance of about half a meter the main charge could penetrate up to 100 millimeter of armour. Testing conducted by the German army indicated that the mine stood a 65 to 68 percent chance of knocking out a tank.

The mine entered service in 1943, and around 25,000 were produced before production was terminated in late 1943 or early 1944 due to "jealousies within Army departments".

== Specifications ==
- Height of mine body (excluding wooden post): 0.35 m
- Weight: 3 kg approx
- Explosive content: 0.8 kg
