= 21 cm Kanone 38 =

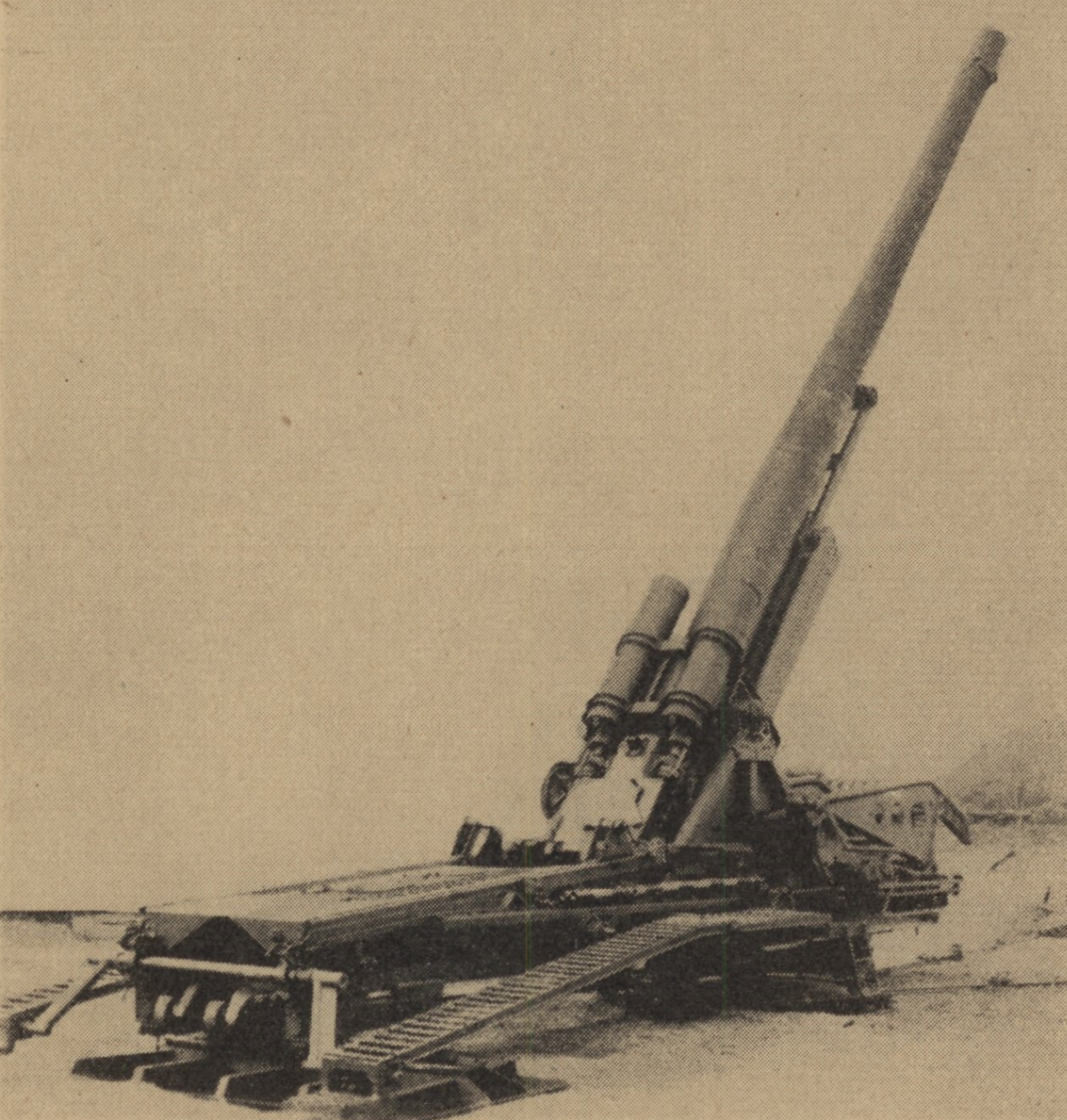
- Type: Heavy siege howitzer
- Place of origin: Nazi Germany

Service history
- Used by: Nazi Germany
- Wars: World War II

Production history
- Designer: Krupp
- Designed: 1938 – 1940
- Manufacturer: Krupp
- Developed from: 21 cm Mrs 18
- Produced: 1940 – 1943
- No. built: 8

Specifications
- Mass: 25,300 kg (55,800 lb)
- Barrel length: 11.62 m (38.1 ft) L/55.5
- Shell: separate-loading, cased charge (3 charges)
- Caliber: 211 mm (8.3 in)
- Breech: horizontal sliding block
- Carriage: box trail
- Elevation: 0° to +50°
- Traverse: 17° on carriage 360° on platform
- Rate of fire: 1 rpm
- Muzzle velocity: 905 m/s (2,970 ft/s)
- Maximum firing range: 33,900 m (37,100 yd)
- Filling weight: 120 kg (260 lb)

The 21 cm Kanone 38 (21 cm K 38) was a heavy gun used by Germany in World War II. Its development began in 1938 after Krupp's success with the 21 cm Mrs 18, but it was not fielded until 1941. It likely equipped Artillerie-Abteilungen 767 and 768, which were the only Heer battalions to field 21 cm guns during the war. Some guns may have served on coastal defence duties.

== Design and history ==
It was generally similar in design to Krupp's 21 cm Mrs 18, but had an improved carriage that sped up emplacement and displacement times. It was transported in the customary two loads – barrel and carriage, although the carriage rode on two limbers. Each end of the carriage had inclined under-surfaces that rode on the limbers. When winched apart or together, those inclined surfaces allowed the carriage to easily raise out of or lower into position. It fired from a central platform stabilized by three jacks, which allowed all-around traverse.

Only eight were produced before the Heer decided that 21 cm was an unsuitable caliber and canceled the remaining seven guns under contract. One gun was sent to Japan by submarine.

== Ammunition ==
The gun fired a 120 kg (260 lb) 21 cm K Gr 38 HE shell. It used three individual bags of propellant in the cartridge case; they were not combined. The light load (Kleine Ladung) weighed 34 kilograms (75 lb) and propelled the shell at 680 metres per second (2,200 ft/s). The medium load (Mittlere Ladung) weighed 42.2 kilograms (93 lb) and gave a muzzle velocity of 796 metres per second (2,610 ft/s). The big load (Grosse Ladung) weighed 60.2 kilograms (133 lb) and yielded a muzzle velocity of 905 metres per second (2,970 ft/s).
