= 21 cm GrW 69 =

21 cm Granatwerfer 69
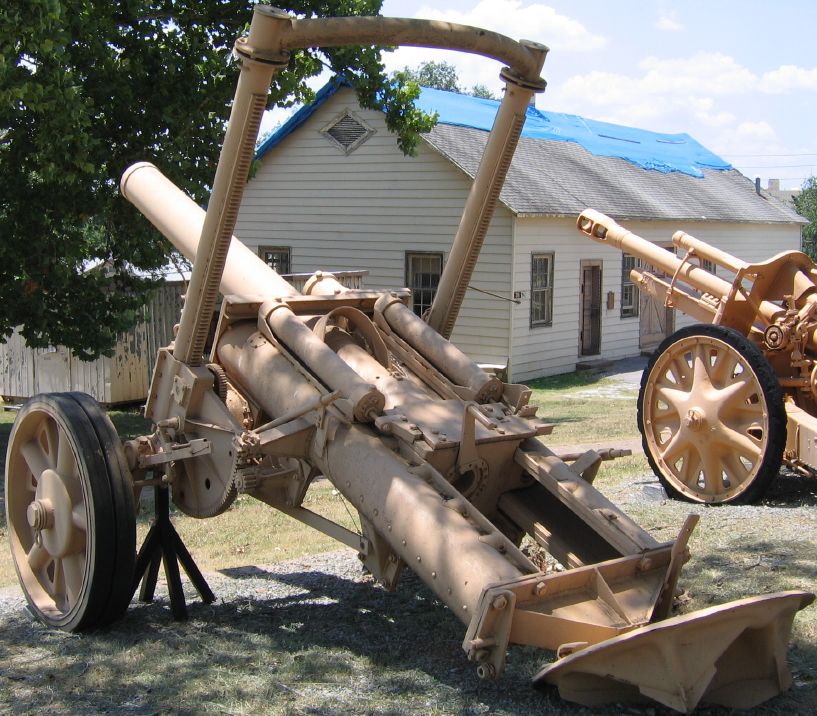
- A GrW 69 at the U.S. Army Field Artillery Museum, Ft. Sill, OK
- Type: Mortar
- Place of origin: Nazi Germany

Service history
- In service: 1944–45
- Used by: Nazi Germany
- Wars: Second World War

Production history
- Designer: Skoda
- Manufacturer: Skoda
- Produced: 1944–45
- No. built: 200

Specifications
- Mass: 2,800 kg (6,173 lbs)
- Barrel length: 3 metres (9 ft 10 in)
- Caliber: 210.9 mm (8.30 in)
- Elevation: 40° to 70°
- Traverse: 60°
- Muzzle velocity: 285 m/s (935 ft/s) light bomb 247 m/s (810 ft/s) heavy bomb
- Effective firing range: 5,190 m (5,676 yds) heavy bomb
- Maximum firing range: 6,300 m (6,890 yds) light bomb

The 21 cm Granatwerfer 69 was a mortar used by Germany during World War II. This weapon may also be known as the GR 19 and B 19 or by its nickname "Elefant".

The prototype was built by Skoda as the 22 cm sGrW B 14, but was redesigned to 21 cm at OKH's request to use existing ammunition. It was designed to be towed as a complete unit, the baseplate riding above the tube. In firing position, the wheels rested in shoes that rested on a semicircular rail track. The baseplate was attached to the mount by a ball joint to allow for traverse without reseating the baseplate. Elevation was obtained by rack and pinion on the upright legs. The firing mechanism was built into the breech ring and was of the continuous pull type.

The production version had a weight of 2,800 kg, 6,400 m range, and a rate of fire of 1-2 per minute, and could fire three types of shells:

- 21 cm Wurfgranate 5004 (explosive for removing barbed wire), 110 kg, range = 5,190 m.
- 21 cm Wurfgranate 5021 (fragmentation grenade), 85 kg, range = 6,300 m.
- 21 cm Wurfgranate 5031 (for penetrating concrete), 85 kg, range = 6,300 m.

By November 1944 the first 33 units were produced, with a total of 168 by the end of World War II. There were plans to use the mortar on Panzer III and Hummel chassis.

== Bibliography ==
- Gander, Terry and Chamberlain, Peter. Weapons of the Third Reich: An Encyclopedic Survey of All Small Arms, Artillery and Special Weapons of the German Land Forces 1939-1945. New York: Doubleday, 1979 ISBN 0-385-15090-3
