= Blendkörper 1H =

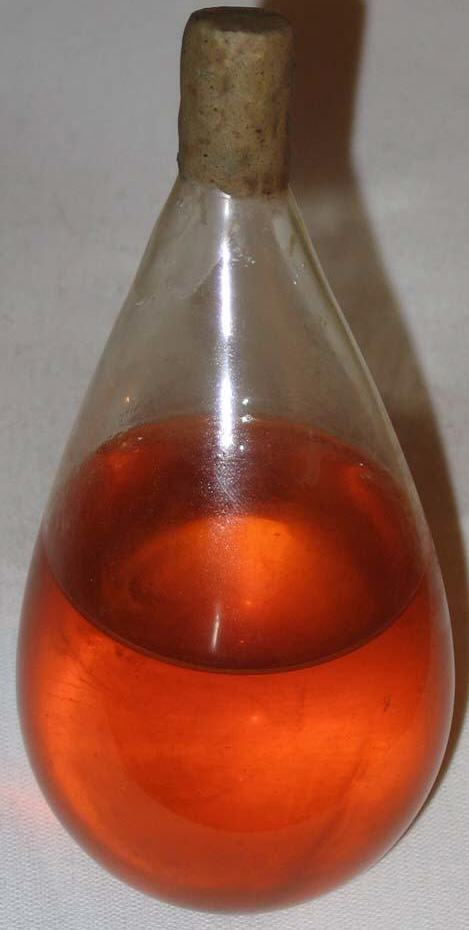
- Type: Smoke grenade
- Place of origin: Germany

Service history
- Used by: Wehrmacht
- Wars: World War II

Specifications
- Mass: 370 g (13.2 oz)
- Length: 150 mm (6 in)
- Diameter: 64 mm (2.5 in)
- Warhead: Titanium tetrachloride
- Warhead weight: 260 g (9.2 oz)

The Blendkörper 1H was a non-lethal smoke grenade that was developed by Germany and used by the Wehrmacht during World War II.

== Design ==
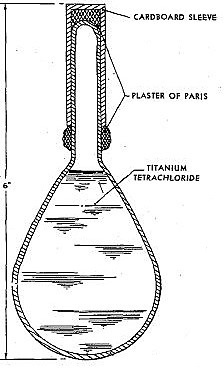
A diagram of the Blendkörper 1H.

The Blendkörper 1H consisted of a glass bulb sealed with plaster of paris roughly the size of a light bulb but of made of thicker glass that contained 260 g (9.2 oz) of titanium tetrachloride. The grenade was used to temporarily blind the crews of pillboxes and vehicles. The grenade was carried in a hexagonal cardboard container and was pulled from the container by a tape attached to the lid of the box that was glued to the neck of the bulb. The lid was then removed and the grenade was thrown against the target. When the bulb burst the mixture vaporized and gave off a thick white smoke. A downside was that it didn't work well with low humidity. This was addressed by the similar Blendkörper 2H.
