= 24 cm Theodor Kanone (E) =

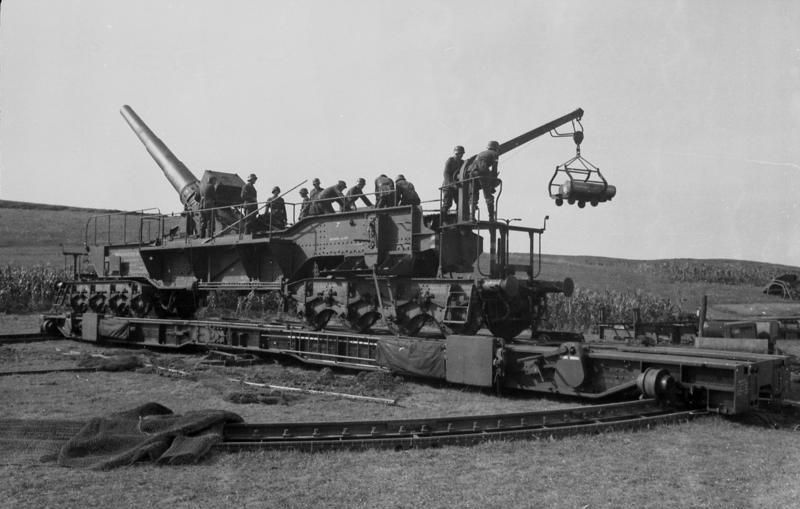
- A Theodore Kanone mounted on a Vögele turntable; note the ammunition being hoisted up to the mount
- Type: Railway Gun
- Place of origin: Germany

Service history
- In service: 1937–45
- Used by: Nazi Germany
- Wars: World War II

Production history
- Designer: Krupp
- Manufacturer: Krupp
- Produced: 1937
- No. built: 3

Specifications
- Mass: 95 tonnes (93 long tons; 105 short tons)
- Length: 18.45 metres (60 ft 6 in)
- Barrel length: 8.9 metres (29 ft 2 in) L/40
- Shell: separate-loading, cased charge
- Caliber: 238 millimetres (9.4 in)
- Breech: horizontal sliding-block
- Recoil: hydro-pneumatic
- Carriage: 2 x 4-axle bogies
- Elevation: +10° to +45°
- Traverse: 40' on mounting 360° on Vögele turntable
- Rate of fire: 1 round per 3 minutes
- Muzzle velocity: 810 m/s (2,700 ft/s)
- Maximum firing range: 26,750 metres (29,250 yd)

The 24 cm Theodor Kanone (E – Eisenbahnlafette (railroad mounting)) was a German railroad gun used during World War II in the Battle of France and on coast-defense duties in Occupied France for the rest of the war. Three were built during the 1930s using forty-year-old ex-naval guns.

== Design ==
As part of the re-armament program initiated by the Nazis after taking power in 1933 the Army High Command (Oberkommando des Heeres - OKH) ordered Krupp to begin work on new railroad artillery designs, but they would take a long time to develop. Krupp pointed out that it could deliver a number of railroad guns much more quickly using obsolete guns already on hand and modernizing their original World War I mountings for which it still had drawings available. OKH agreed and authorized Krupp in 1936 to begin design of a series of guns between 15 and 28 cm (5.9 and 11.0 in) for delivery by 1939 as the Emergency Program (Sofort-Programm).

Three 24 cm SK L/40 C/94 guns originally used by the Kaiser Friedrich III- and Wittelsbach-class pre-dreadnoughts were placed on new mounts patterned on the E. u. B. (Eisenbahn und Bettungsgerüst - railroad and firing platform) mount used by the same guns in World War I as the 24 cm SK L/40 "Theodor Karl". The new mounts lacked the under-carriage pivot and rollers used for the firing platform (Bettungsgerüst) in World War I as the Vögele turntable (Drehscheibe) completely replaced the old system. The turntable consisted of a circular track with a pivot mount in the center for a platform on which the railroad gun itself was secured. A ramp was used to raise the railway gun to the level of the platform. The platform had rollers at each end which rested on the circular rail for 360° traverse. It had a capacity of 300 tonnes (300 long tons; 330 short tons), enough for most of the railroad guns in the German inventory. The gun could only be loaded at 0° elevation and so had to be re-aimed for each shot. One obvious change made for land service was the placement of a large counterweight just forward of the trunnions to counteract the preponderance of weight towards the breech. This, although heavy, was simpler than adding equilibrators to perform the same function. All three guns were delivered in 1937.

=== Ammunition ===
The shells for this gun were loaded using a four-wheeled ammunition cart to move the shells and powder from the rear of the mount where it was hoisted from the ground or an ammunition car by the on-mount crane. It used the German naval system of ammunition where the base charge was held in a metallic cartridge case and supplemented by another charge in a silk bag which was rammed first.

Shell name	Weight	Filling Weight	Muzzle velocity	Range
nose- and base-fused HE shell with ballistic cap (Sprenggranate L/4.2 m Bdz u. Kz. m Hb)	148.5 kg (327 lb)	16.4 kg (36 lb) (TNT)	810 m/s (2,700 ft/s)	26,750 m (29,250 yd)
base-fused armor-piercing shell with ballistic cap (Panzer-Sprenggranate) L/4.1 m Bdz. m Hb)	151 kg (333 lb)	14.9 kg (33 lb) (HE)	Unknown	Unknown

== Combat history ==
Two Theodors equipped Railroad Artillery Battery (Artillerie-Batterie (E.) 674 during the French campaign as it supported XXV Army Corps, 7th Army, Army Group C from Ettenheim south of Strasbourg during its passage of the Rhine River. From July 1941 they spent the rest of the war on coast defense duties assigned to Batteries 664 and 674 in the vicinity of Hendaye and Saint-Jean-de-Luz near the Spanish border with France, although sources differ on which guns were assigned to which batteries on what dates. Both batteries were able to retreat to Germany by 1 September 1944 after the invasion of Normandy in June 1944, but nothing is known of their activities afterwards.
