= PC 500 =

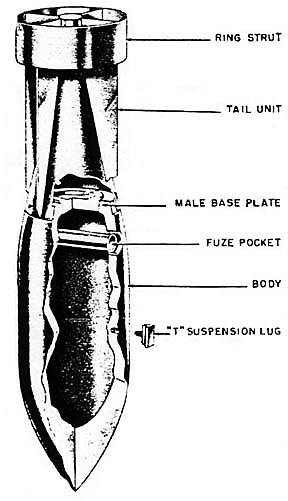
- Type: Armor-piercing bomb
- Place of origin: Nazi Germany

Service history
- Used by: Luftwaffe
- Wars: World War II

Production history
- Variants: D500E; D500L

Specifications
- Mass: D500E: 539 kg (1,188 lb); D500L: 416 kg (917 lb)
- Length: D550E: 1.73 m (5 ft 8 in); D500L: 2.01 m (6 ft 7 in)
- Diameter: D500E: 406 mm (16 in); D500L: 381 mm (15 in)
- Warhead: Amatol; TNT
- Warhead weight: D500E: 75 kg (165 lb); D500L: 78 kg (172 lb)

The PC 500 (Panzersprengbombe Cylindrisch) or cylindrical armor-piercing explosive bomb in English was a series of armor-piercing bombs used by the Luftwaffe during World War II.

== History ==
The PC series of bombs differed from the SC series because they had thick cases for enhanced penetration of armored targets like warships or reinforced concrete fortifications. While the SD series bombs could be used in a semi-armor piercing role the PC series of bombs were specifically designed as armor-piercing bombs. Since they had thicker hardened steel cases their charge to weight ratio was only 20% of their total weight. Bombs in the PC series included the PC 500, PC 1000, PC 1400, and PC 1600. The number in the bombs designation corresponded to the approximate weight of the bomb. The smaller bombs had either Amatol or TNT while the larger bombs were filled more powerful explosives like RDX and Trialen to compensate for their reduced charges. The PC series of bombs were fitted with a time delay fuze which detonated the bomb after it had pierced a target destroying it with a combination of its blast and fragments. The PC series served as a base for the later PC RS series rocket propelled bombs which were designed to enhance penetration by increasing their terminal velocity.

== Design ==
The body was of one-piece forged steel construction which was filled through the base with either Amatol or TNT and was fitted with either a sheet steel or magnesium alloy 4 finned tail with a cylindrical strut. There was a single transverse fuze pocket near the base of the bomb. The PC 500 was horizontally suspended by a T-Type suspension lug in a bomb bay or fuselage hardpoint. The bombs were painted dark grey with a dark blue stripe on the tail.

There were two variants of the PC 500 series:

- D500E - This version was the heavier of the two, it was shorter, had a thicker diameter, was thicker cased, and had a charge to weight ratio of 14%.
- D500L - This version was the lighter of the two, it was longer, had a smaller diameter, was thinner cased, was thicker nosed and had a charge to weight ratio of 19%.

== See also ==
- List of weapons of military aircraft of Germany during World War II
