= PC 1600 =

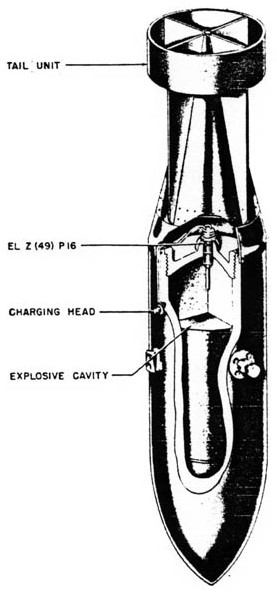
- Type: Armor-piercing bomb
- Place of origin: Nazi Germany

Service history
- Used by: Luftwaffe
- Wars: World War II

Specifications
- Mass: 1,600 kg (3,500 lb)
- Length: 2.82 m (9 ft 3 in)
- Diameter: 533 mm (21 in)
- Warhead: RDX
- Warhead weight: 230 kg (510 lb)

The PC 1600 (Panzersprengbombe Cylindrisch) or cylindrical armor-piercing explosive bomb in English was an armor-piercing bomb used by the Luftwaffe during World War II.

== History ==
The PC series of bombs differed from the SC series because they had thick cases for enhanced penetration of armored targets like warships or reinforced concrete fortifications. While the SD series bombs could be used in a semi-armor piercing role the PC series of bombs were specifically designed as armor-piercing bombs. Since they had thicker hardened steel cases their charge to weight ratio was only 20% of their total weight. Bombs in the PC series included the PC 500, PC 1000, PC 1400, and PC 1600. The number in the bombs designation corresponded to the approximate weight of the bomb. The smaller bombs had either Amatol or TNT while the larger bombs were filled with more powerful explosives like RDX and Trialen to compensate for their reduced charges. The PC series of bombs were fitted with a time delay fuze which detonated the bomb after it had pierced a target destroying it with a combination of its blast and fragments. The PC series served as a base for the later PC RS series rocket propelled bombs which were designed to enhance penetration by increasing their terminal velocity.

== Design ==
The body was of two-piece construction which was filled through the base with RDX and was fitted with a 4 finned tail with a cylindrical strut. There was a single electric base fuze and there was a charging head on the rear 1/3 of the bomb. The PC 1600 could be horizontally suspended in a bomb bay and when construction was terminated in 1942 there were no replacements. It is claimed that it could penetrate 180 mm (7 in) of armor or 2.5 m (8 ft 2 in) of reinforced concrete at a 60° angle when dropped from an altitude of 4,000–6,000 m (13,000–20,000 ft).

== See also ==
- List of weapons of military aircraft of Germany during World War II
