= Behelfs-Schützenmine S.150 =

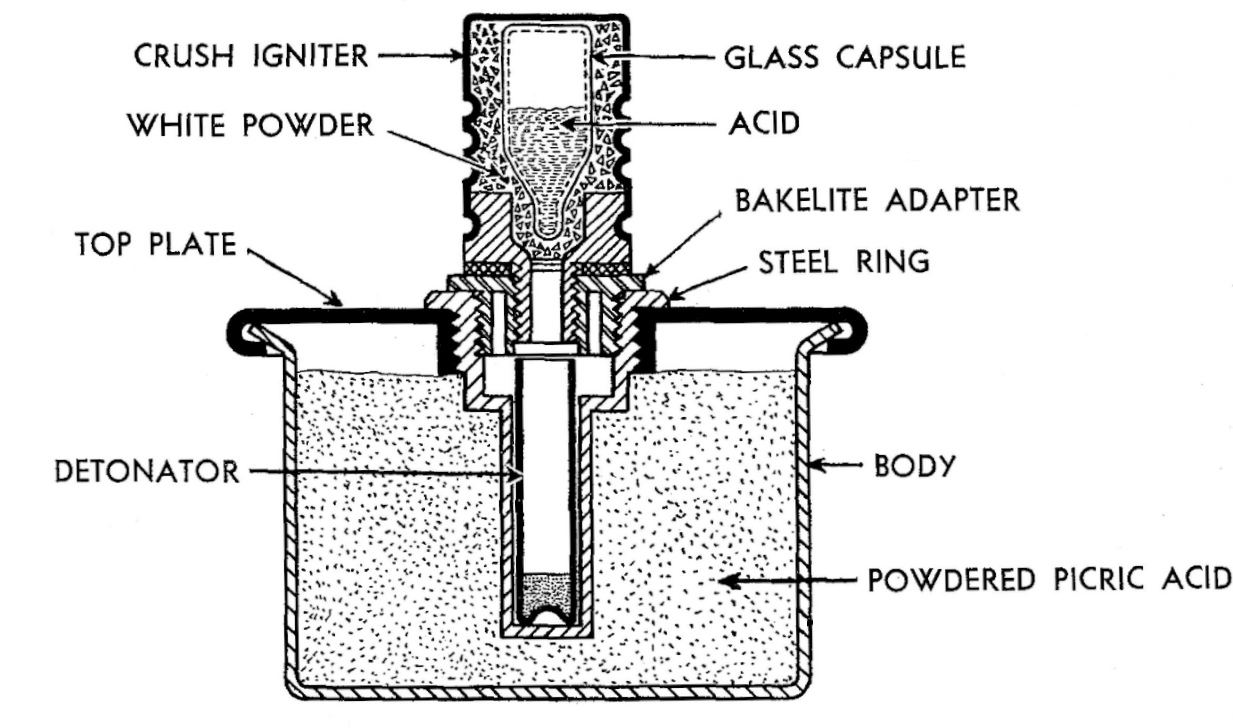
- Diagram of a Behelfs-Schützenmine S.150 from a US Army manual
- Type: Anti-personnel mine
- Place of origin: Germany

Service history
- In service: 1944-45
- Used by: Wehrmacht
- Wars: World War II

Specifications
- Mass: 12 oz (340 g)
- Height: Body: 2 in (51 mm); Igniter: 1.5 in (38 mm)
- Diameter: 2.5 in (64 mm)
- Filling: Picric acid
- Filling weight: 5.25 oz (149 g)
- Detonation mechanism: Crush igniter

The Behelfs-Schützenmine S.150 was an anti-personnel mine that was developed by Germany and used by the Wehrmacht during World War II.

== Design ==
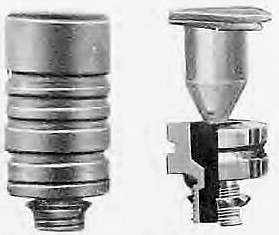
A Buck igniter and a cutaway showing the internal glass ampoule

The Behelfs-Schützenmine S.150 was designed to be a small, cheap, simple anti-personnel mine. It was known by a number of nicknames such as the "Pot Mine", "Picric Pot", "Jerry Mine", or "Mustard Pot" due to its brownish-yellow colour. The body was cylindrical in shape and was made from pressed steel or aluminium and contained an explosive charge of powdered picric acid. The top plate was pressed steel or aluminium which screwed onto the body and a chemical crush igniter known as a German Buck Igniter screwed into the centre of the top plate. The igniter was aluminium and contained a glass ampoule, half-filled with sulphuric acid, and surrounded by potassium perchlorate flash powder. A small brass detonator (German Nr. 8) was inserted into the centre of the explosives.

A weight of 16 kg (35 lb) crushed the igniter, broke the glass ampoule and allowed the acid to mix with the flash powder. The violent chemical reaction ignited the detonator and exploded the mine. The mine did not have a safety or anti-tamper mechanism. Disarming one was a fairly simple procedure of unscrewing the igniter near the base, avoiding the fragile top.
