= 28 cm schwere Bruno Kanone (E) =

- Type: Railway Gun
- Place of origin: Germany

Service history
- In service: 1937–45
- Used by: Nazi Germany
- Wars: World War II

Production history
- Designer: Krupp
- Manufacturer: Krupp
- Produced: 1937–38
- No. built: 2

Specifications
- Mass: 118 tonnes (116 long tons; 130 short tons)
- Length: 22.8 metres (74 ft 10 in)
- Barrel length: 11.08 metres (36 ft 4 in) L/42
- Shell: separate-loading, cased charge
- Caliber: 283 millimetres (11.1 in)
- Breech: horizontal sliding-block
- Recoil: hydro-pneumatic
- Carriage: 2 x 5-axle bogies
- Elevation: +10° to +45°
- Traverse: 20' on mounting 360° on Vögele turntable
- Muzzle velocity: 860 m/s (2,800 ft/s)
- Maximum firing range: 35,700 metres (39,000 yd)

The 28 cm schwere Bruno Kanone (E - Eisenbahnlafette (railroad mounting)), often abbreviated as s.Br.K, was a German railroad gun used during World War II in the invasion of France and on coast-defense duties in Occupied Norway for the rest of the war. Two were built using pre-World War I coast-defense guns during the 1930s.

== Design ==
As part of the re-armament program initiated by the Nazis after taking power in 1933 the Army High Command (Oberkommando des Heeres - OKH) ordered Krupp to begin work on new railroad artillery designs, but they would take a long time to develop. Krupp pointed out that it could deliver a number of railroad guns much more quickly using obsolete guns already on hand and modernizing their original World War I mountings for which it still had drawings available. OKH agreed and authorized Krupp in 1936 to begin design of a series of guns between 15 and 28 cm (5.9 and 11.0 in) for delivery by 1939 as the Emergency Program (Sofort-Programm).

Two aged 28 cm Küsten Kanone L/42 (42 caliber Coastal Cannon) guns seized from the Belgians on the outbreak of World War I had survived the war and were placed on new mounts that were shared by all of the 28 cm "Bruno" railroad guns. The gun could traverse only enough on the mount itself for fine corrections, coarser adjustments had to be made by turning the entire mount on the Vögele turntable. The turntable (Drehscheibe) consisted of a circular track with a pivot mount in the center for a platform on which the railroad gun itself was secured. A ramp was used to raise the railway gun to the level of the platform. The platform had rollers at each end which rested on the circular rail for 360° traverse. It had a capacity of 300 tonnes (300 long tons; 330 short tons), enough for most of the railroad guns in the German inventory. The gun could only be loaded at 0° elevation and so had to be re-aimed for each shot. Both guns were delivered by 1938.

It fired nose- and base-fused high-explosive 284 kg (626 lb) shells with a ballistic cap (28 cm Sprenggranate L/4.4 m KZ m BdZ m Hb) filled with 22.9 kilograms (50 lb) of TNT.

== Combat history ==
During the Battle of France schwere Brunos equipped Railroad Artillery Battery (Artillerie-Batterie (E.) 689 for which the only known activity was firing on targets in southern Alsace from Lörrach between 14 and 17 June 1940. The battery was later transferred to Nærbø, Norway for coast defense duties under the command of Artillery Group Stavanger-South (Artilleriegruppe Stavanger-Süd). Lastly they were moved East along the coast to guard the port of Fredrikstad, Norway, when four 24 cm (9.4 in) ex-French railroad guns were transferred in from Narvik in 1944.
