= Blendkörper 2H =

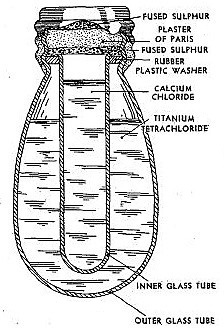
- Type: Smoke grenade
- Place of origin: Germany

Service history
- Used by: Wehrmacht
- Wars: World War II

Specifications
- Mass: 480 g (1 lb 1 oz)
- Length: 120 mm (4.8 in)
- Diameter: 64 mm (2.5 in)
- Warhead: Outer: 250 g (9 oz) of Titanium tetrachloride. Inner: 25 g (0.88 oz) of calcium chloride.

The Blendkörper 2H was a non-lethal smoke grenade that was developed by Germany and used by the Wehrmacht during World War II.

== Design ==
The Blendkörper 2H was similar to the earlier Blendkörper 1H in concept and construction. The Blendkörper 2H was roughly the size of a light bulb but made from thicker glass and consisted of two glass bulbs filled with liquid and sealed with plaster of paris. The grenade was used to temporarily blind the crews of pillboxes and vehicles. When the bulb burst the mixture vaporized and gave off a thick white smoke. The outer vial contained 250 g (9 oz) of titanium tetrachloride while the inner vial contained 25 g (0.88 oz) of calcium chloride. A downside of the Blendkörper 1H was that it did not work well with low humidity and this was addressed by the Blendkörper 2H. A notice on the side of the container for four grenades, says that they are suitable for use at temperatures down to -40°.
