= Hohl-Sprung mine 4672 =

German WW2 anti-tank mine

The Hohl-Sprung Mine 4672 or Hohlladungs-Spring-Mine 4672 (HL.Sp.Mi. 4672) ("hollow-charge jump mine") was a German anti-tank mine, together with the Panzer stab 43. Developed during the Second World War it was the first landmine to combine a shaped charge anti-tank warhead with a tilt rod fuze.

The Panzerfaust warhead was mounted in a metal holder on a wooden panel buried in the ground with a Ki.Z.43 fuze protruding above the ground. When a vehicle passes over the mine, the rod is forced sideways triggering a black powder charge at the base of the projectile, launching the projectile out of the ground and into the belly of the vehicles.

The large shaped charge was capable of penetrating over 100 mm of belly armour, significantly more than tanks of the era had. Tests conducted by the Germans suggested the mine was capable of completely destroying (rather than merely disabling) 85% of the tanks it attacked, making it impossible to redeploy repaired vehicles and crew.

Deliveries to the Wehrmacht began in October 1944 but the mine was not issued to combat troops until January 1945 due to manufacturing faults. Only 59,000 were built because it was felt that the warheads were better employed with the proven Panzerfaust technology.

== Specifications ==
- Weight: 4.5 kg (9 lb 15 oz)
- Explosive content: 1.6 kg (3 lb 8 oz) shaped charge
- Diameter: 0.159 m (6.3 in)
- Height: 0.285 m (11.2 in)
