= Granatwerfer 42 =

WW2 German infantry mortar

12 cm Granatwerfer 42
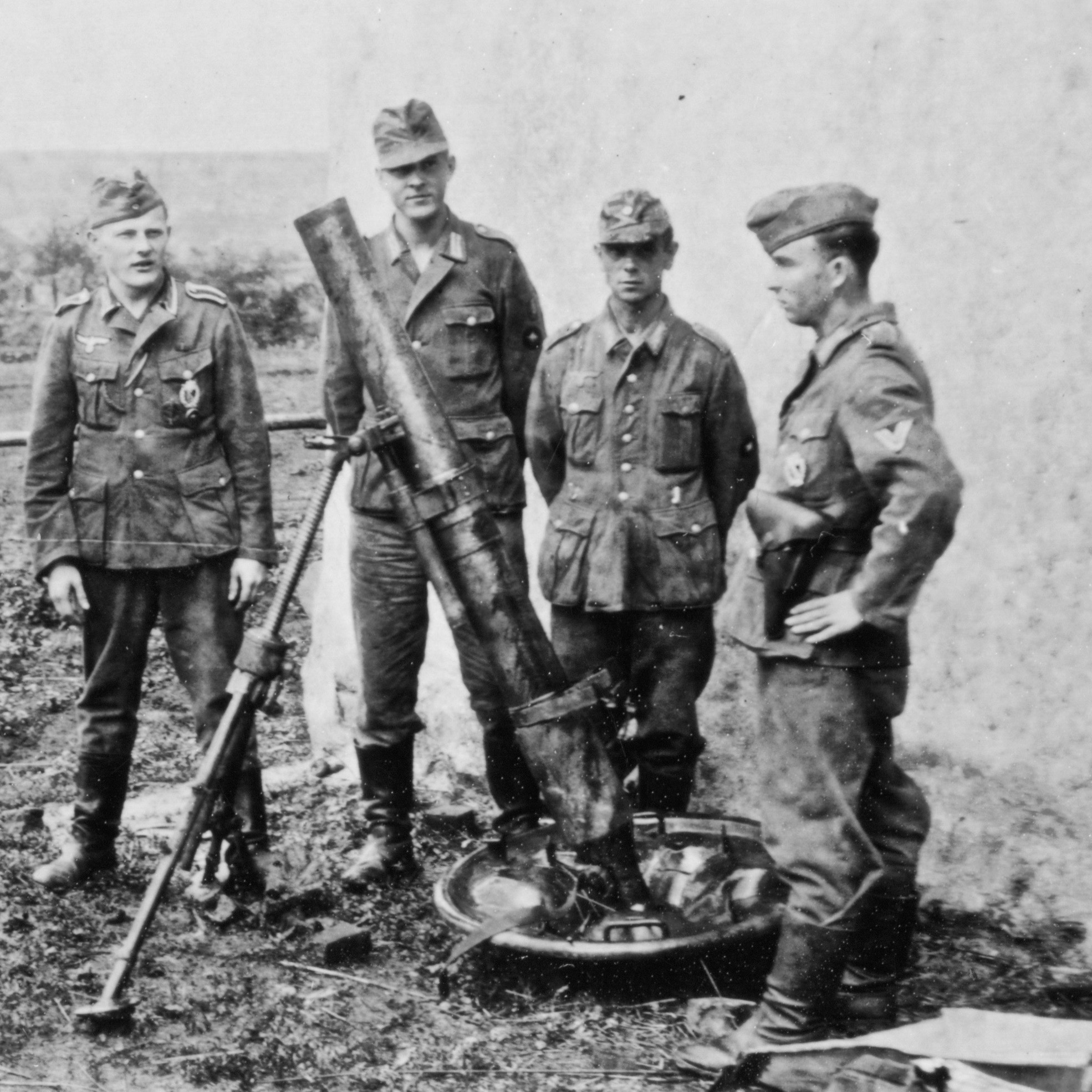
- Granatwerfer 42 on the Eastern Front
- Type: Mortar
- Place of origin: Nazi Germany

Service history
- Used by: Nazi Germany
- Wars: Second World War

Production history
- Designed: 1942
- Unit cost: 1,200 Reichsmark
- Produced: 1943–1945
- No. built: 8,461

Specifications
- Mass: 280 kg (620 lb)
- Barrel length: 1.865 m (6 ft 1.4 in) L/15.5
- Shell: 15.6 kg (34 lb 6 oz) bomb
- Caliber: 120 mm (4.7 in)
- Elevation: 45° to 85°
- Traverse: 8° to 17° variable with elevation
- Rate of fire: 8-10 rpm
- Muzzle velocity: 280 m/s (920 ft/s)
- Maximum firing range: 6 km (3.7 mi)

The 12 cm Granatwerfer 42 (literally, "grenade thrower Model 42"; official designation: 12 cm GrW 42) was a mortar used by Germany during World War II.

== Development ==
Developed in 1942, the 12 cm (about 4.7 in) GrW 42 was an attempt to give German infantry units a close support weapon with greater performance than the mortars used in general service at the time. This weapon was very similar to the M1938 mortar used by Soviet forces on the Eastern Front, which in turn was an improved version of the French 120 mm Brandt Mle 1935 mortar. The 120 mm Brandt m35 was used in limited quantities during the Battle of France and exported to the USSR and other nations before the country's capitulation in 1940. The Soviet PM 38 120 mm mortar, was captured in large quantities during the war in the East and pressed into service by the Germans and other Axis nations before the introduction of similar nationally produced 12 cm mortar designs. In German use, the captured Soviet mortar was given the designation 12 cm Granatwerfer 378 (r).

== Description ==
The GrW 42 was basically the usual three-part construction made up of a circular base plate like the previous Soviet design, the tube itself and the supporting bipod. Because of the greater weight of the weapon (280 kilograms or 620 pounds) a two-wheeled axle was utilized, enabling the mortar to be towed into action. The axle could then be quickly removed before firing. A total of 5,373,000 rounds of ammunition were produced for the weapon.
