= 20 cm leichter Ladungswerfer =

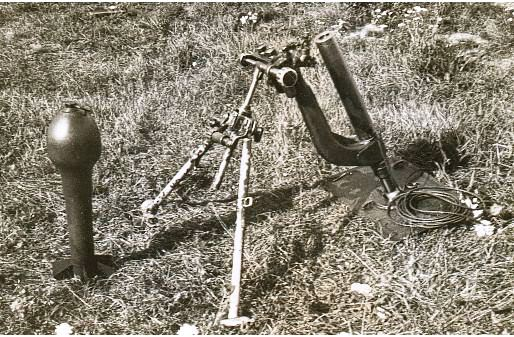
- Type: Spigot mortar
- Place of origin: Nazi Germany

Service history
- In service: 1940–1945
- Used by: Nazi Germany
- Wars: World War II

Production history
- Designer: Rheinmetall
- Designed: 1940
- Manufacturer: Rheinmetall
- Produced: 1940
- No. built: 158

Specifications
- Mass: 93 kg (205 lb): Bipod: 20 kg (43 lb); Spigot & supporting arm: 33.3 kg (73.5 lb)
- Barrel length: 54 cm (1 ft 9 in)
- Shell: HE (20 cm Wgr. 40)
- Shell weight: 21.27 kg (46 lb 14 oz)
- Caliber: Projectile: 200 mm (7.9 in); Spigot: 90 mm (3.5 in)
- Elevation: 45° / 80°
- Traverse: 5°
- Maximum firing range: 700 m (766 yd) (three increments: small, medium, and large)
- Sights: Richtaufsatz 39 dial
- Filling: Amatol
- Filling weight: 6.8 kg (15 lb)

The 20 cm leichter Ladungswerfer (20 cm le.LdgW) was a spigot mortar used by Germany during World War II. It was used by engineers to demolish obstacles and strongpoints. It was gradually withdrawn from front-line service from 1942.

It fired High Explosive (20 cm Wgr. 40) and smoke rounds in addition to a special Harpunengeschosse (harpoon bomb) that carried a rope with hooks to clear mines or wire obstacles. The mortar was towed via the Pf. 25 handcart. Production was discontinued after 158 pieces had been delivered, and the mortars were replaced with the Granatwerfer 42.

== Bibliography ==
- Gander, Terry and Chamberlain, Peter. Weapons of the Third Reich: An Encyclopedic Survey of All Small Arms, Artillery and Special Weapons of the German Land Forces 1939-1945. New York: Doubleday, 1979 ISBN 0-385-15090-3
