= Jagdfaust =

German recoilless aircraft gun

Sondergerät SG 500 Jagdfaust
- Type: Anti-aircraft weapon
- Place of origin: Nazi Germany

Service history
- In service: 1945

Specifications

The Sondergerät SG 500 Jagdfaust ("hunting fist") or Jägerfaust ("hunter's fist") was an experimental airborne anti-bomber recoilless rifle designed for use in the Me 163 Komet rocket plane by the German Luftwaffe during World War II.

== Design ==
The Jagdfaust design was based on the Schräge Musik, the manually triggered upward-firing air-to-air cannon extensively deployed with the Luftwaffe night fighter squadrons.

The Komet was so fast that pilots found it difficult to fire enough cannon rounds to destroy a bomber in a single pass. The Jagdfaust was developed to address this problem. A 5 cm shell was mounted in a launch tube held in place by a pair of thin pins. Four such tubes were mounted vertically (to fire upward) in each wing. To ensure it would be fired at the correct time, the weapon featured a simple form of automated trigger in which an optical photocell detected the dark silhouette of an Allied bomber replacing bright blue sky and triggered the firing of the armed Jagdfaust guns. When the weapon fired, the force of the launch would break the pins holding the tube in place and the heavy tube would be ejected downward to offset the momentum of the explosive force of the shell. As a result, the plane's flight was not affected.

The Jagdfaust used a 5 cm Minengranate shell, whose thin walls traded fragmentation for additional explosives; when detonated within an aircraft with sheet metal skin, the skin would be blown off to devastating effect. The entire weapon was designed for economy. Because it was intended for short range use, the shell had an aerodynamically inefficient shape that could be easily forged or stamped. Its tolerances were loose, as its long-range accuracy was not an issue. Instead of a driving band, the shell flared at its base and was machined to engage the rifling. The launch tube was made of soft unalloyed steel since it would not need to keep its rifling over repeated firings. The shell used a simple type of fuse instead of the more complex and expensive AZ 39 Safety Fuse. It was probably shipped pre-assembled and ready to install.

== Operational history ==
The weapon system is credited with one kill: on April 10, 1945 Fritz Kelb downed an RAF Lancaster using it. Though initial results were promising, the war ended before it could see extensive deployment. It is believed only two aircraft were ever outfitted with it.

== See also ==
- List of weapons of military aircraft of Germany during World War II
- Wunderwaffe
