= 10.5 cm Leichtgeschütz 40 =

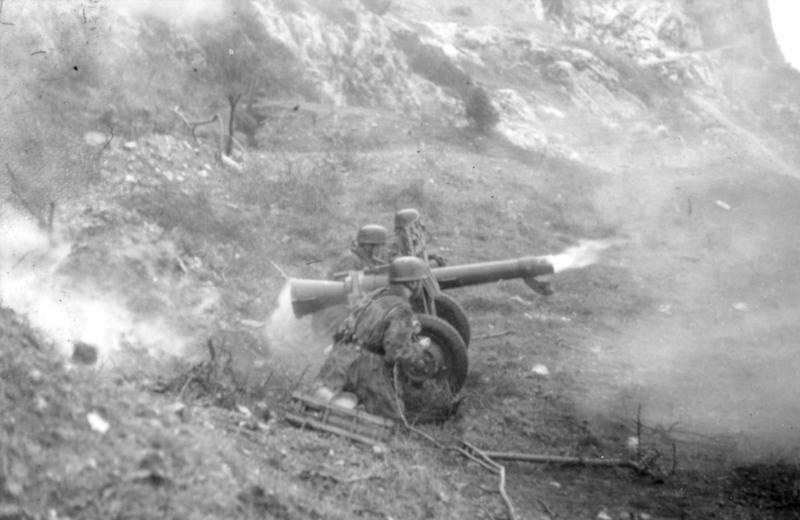
- Fallschirmjäger firing a 10.5 cm LG 40 at Monte Circeo San Felice, Italy 1943.
- Type: Recoilless gun
- Place of origin: Nazi Germany

Service history
- In service: 1942–45
- Used by: Nazi Germany
- Wars: World War II

Production history
- Manufacturer: Krupp
- Produced: 1942–44
- Variants: LG 40-1, LG 40-2

Specifications
- Mass: 388 kg (855 lbs)
- Length: 1.902 m (6 ft 3 in)
- Barrel length: 1.38 m (4 ft 6 in) L/13
- Shell: 105×155 mm. R
- Shell weight: 14.8 kg (32 lb 10 oz) (HE) with 3.1 kg (6.8 lb) propellant
- Caliber: 105 mm (4.13 in)
- Breech: side opening
- Elevation: 15° to + 40° 30'
- Traverse: 80°
- Muzzle velocity: 335 m/s (1,099 ft/s)
- Effective firing range: 7,950 m (8,695 yds)

The 10.5 cm Leichtgeschütz 40, also called the LG 40, was a German recoilless gun used during World War II. It was manufactured by Krupp.

== History ==
After the success of Rheinmetall's 7.5 cm LG 40 during the Battle of Crete in 1941, the Germans were spurred to continue development of recoilless guns in larger calibres. Both Krupp and competitor Rheinmetall developed guns in 10.5 cm, but the LG 40 got into service first.

== Design ==
Krupp's LG 40 was basically an enlarged and improved version of their unsuccessful competitor to Rheinmetall's 75 mm recoilless gun. It retained the earlier model's side-swinging breech and large pneumatic tires. It incorporated torque vanes in the jet nozzle to counteract the torque forces imparted by the round engaging the rifling and any clogged or eroded nozzles. It also used the improved priming mechanism developed after the problems with the smaller weapon became apparent. Like all the German 10.5 cm recoilless rifles it shared shells with the 10.5 cm leFH 18 (light Field Howitzer). The LG 40-1 version was built using an aluminium/magnesium alloy mounting, but the LG 40-2 replaced it with ordinary steel as light alloys became too valuable later in the war. Both versions could be broken down into 5 loads for parachute operations or they could be air-dropped fully assembled in a special shock-absorbing crate.

== Operational use ==
Both 105 mm recoilless guns, unlike the 75 mm LG 40, equipped independent artillery batteries and battalions. These include Batteries 423–426, 429, 433, and 443, most of which were later incorporated into Leichtgeschütze-Abt. (Light Gun Battalion) 423 and 424. These units served in both the Arctic under 20th Mountain Army and in central Russia under Army Group Center.
