= 7.5 cm Leichtgeschütz 40 =

WW2 German recoilless gun

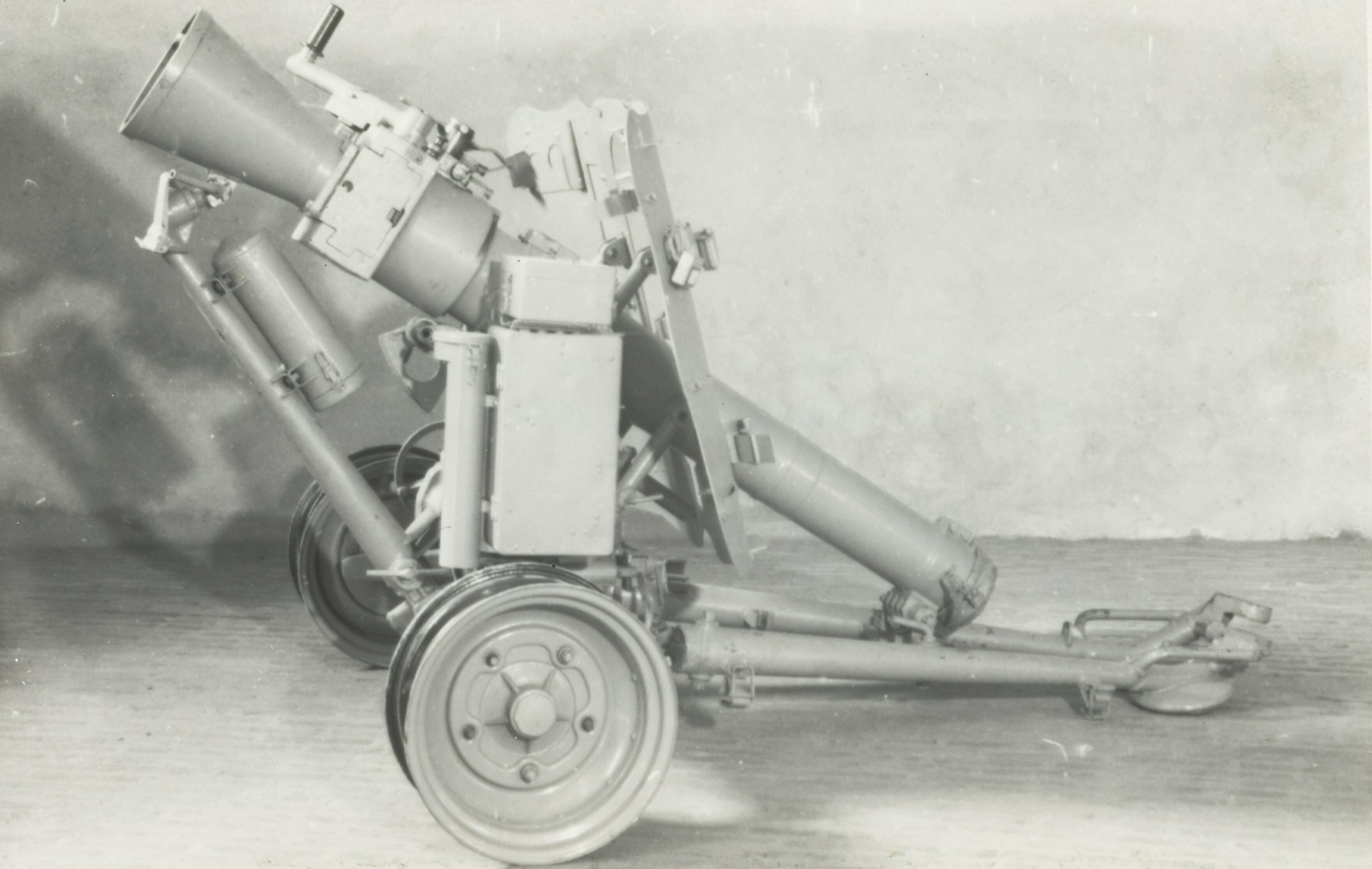
- A 7.5cm Leichtgeschütz 40
- Type: Recoilless gun
- Place of origin: Nazi Germany

Service history
- In service: 1941–45
- Used by: Nazi Germany
- Wars: World War II

Production history
- Manufacturer: Rheinmetall
- Produced: 1941–44
- No. built: 450

Specifications
- Mass: 145 kg (319 lbs)
- Length: 0.75 m (2 ft 6 in)
- Barrel length: 458 mm (1 ft 6 in) L/15.5
- Shell: 75×130 mm. R (HE); 75×200 mm. R (AP)
- Shell weight: 14.8 kg (32 lb 10 oz) (HE)
- Caliber: 75 mm (2.95 in)
- Breech: horizontal sliding block
- Elevation: -15° to +42°
- Traverse: 360° below 20° elevation 60° above 20° elevation
- Rate of fire: 8 rpm
- Muzzle velocity: 350 m/s (1,148 ft/s)
- Effective firing range: 6,800 m (7,434 yds)

The 7.5 cm Leichtgeschütz 40 was a recoilless gun used by the German Army during World War II.

== Background ==
Development of recoilless weapons by Rheinmetall began in 1937 in an effort to provide airborne troops with heavy support weapons that could be dropped by parachute. Both Krupp and Rheinmetall competed for production contracts in a contest that was won by the latter. Initially produced under the designation of LG 1, this was soon changed to LG 40 to match the then current "year of origin" naming system.

== Design issues ==
One characteristic common to all the German recoilless guns, was that they used ordinary shells, albeit with a different cartridge to cater to the unique issues involved in the recoilless principles.

This gun used HE shells from the 7.5 cm Gebirgsgeschütz (Mountain Gun) 36 and the anti-tank shell of the 7.5 cm Feldkanone 16, neuer Art (Field Cannon, New Model). This meant that its ammunition could not be optimized to benefit from the peculiar ballistic characteristics of recoilless weapons. On the other hand, it saved significant research time and effort and meant that existing production lines and stocks of shells could be used at a considerable saving.

Two problems became evident after the Leichtgeschütz (light gun) was fielded. The gas expelled through the venturi of the firing mechanism could cause fouling in the mechanism itself, but fixing this required a redesign of the entire breech and was deemed not worth disrupting the production line or rebuilding the existing guns. The second problem was more serious in that the mounting began to shake itself apart after about 300 rounds were fired. This was principally caused by the torque imparted to the mount when the shell engaged the rifling as well as by the erosion of the nozzles by the combustion gases. These could be countered by welding vanes inside the nozzles that were curved in a direction opposite to the rifling which would then counteract the torque exerted by the shell and minimizing the stress on the gun mount.

== Operational use ==
The LG 40 first saw use during the Battle of Crete where it apparently equipped 2. Batterie/Fallschirmjäger-Artillerie-Abteilung (2nd Battery/Parachute Artillery Battalion). It saw widespread use by German parachute units, both Luftwaffe and Waffen-SS for the rest of the war. The 500th SS-Fallschirmjäger Battalion used four examples during its airdrop on Josip Broz Tito's headquarters at Drvar.

The gun was also used by the German Gebirgsjäger (mountain infantry) in the Caucasus, as well as by Luftwaffe and Waffen-SS units elsewhere. One source states that a second version was developed for the mountain troops which had an increased weight (270 kg) and was used in Italy and the Carpathian Mountains.

== Bibliography ==
- Engelmann, Joachim and Scheibert, Horst. Deutsche Artillerie 1934-1945: Eine Dokumentation in Text, Skizzen und Bildern: Ausrüstung, Gliederung, Ausbildung, Führung, Einsatz. Limburg/Lahn, Germany: C. A. Starke, 1974
- Hogg, Ian V. German Artillery of World War Two. 2nd corrected edition. Mechanicsville, PA: Stackpole Books, 1997 ISBN 1-85367-480-X
