= AB 250-2 =

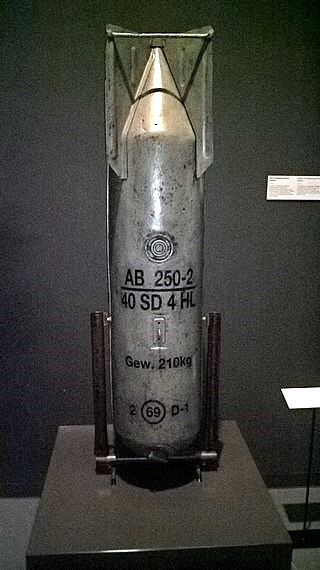
- AB 250-2 with SD 4 HL bombs at Gdańsk, Poland.
- Type: Cluster bomb
- Place of origin: Nazi Germany

Service history
- Used by: Luftwaffe
- Wars: World War II

Specifications
- Mass: 221 kg (487 lb)
- Length: 1.73 m (5 ft 8 in)
- Diameter: 38 cm (1 ft 3 in)

The AB 250-2 (Abwurfbehälter) was a cluster bomb used by the Luftwaffe during World War II.

== AB 250-2 ==
The body of the AB 250-2 was constructed of mild sheet steel and was of clamshell construction and hinged at the tail. It was divided into three compartments; a dome-shaped nose compartment, a cylindrical center compartment, and a cone-shaped tail compartment. The nose compartment housed the fuze pocket which was welded to a bracket on the upper half of the container. The two halves were held together by a shear wire which passed through a steel anvil, in the lower part of the fuze pocket. When the fuze is triggered, this wire was sheared by a small exploder under the fuze. The case then opened and allowed the bombs to fall out. The tail unit had four fins that were welded to the container with braces riveted between each fin.

A number of different sub-munition configurations were possible:

- 224 x SD 1 A or SD 1 FRZ - These were stored in the central compartment. The bombs were packed nose to tail with the tail cup of each bomb forming a safety device for the nose fuze of the bomb behind it. Both bomb types were loaded in the same manner.
- 144 x SD 2 - These were small anti-personnel bombs that were stored in the central compartment.
- 40 x SD 4 HL - These were stored in the central compartment and were packed nose to tail in clusters of 20 with the tail cup of each bomb forming a safety device for the nose fuze of the bomb behind it.
- 17 x SD 10 A - These were stored in the central compartment in a plywood or cardboard box with a center divider. The front half contained eight bombs while the rear held nine. The bomb clusters were held together with steel bands and the clusters were held in place by wooden blocks.
- 17 x SD 10 FRZ - These were stored in the central compartment in a plywood or cardboard box with a center divider in the same way as SD 10 A bombs.
- 28 x SD 10 C - Unknown configuration.

== Sub-munitions ==
Model	Length	Diameter	Weight	Explosive Weight	Explosive
SD 1	170 mm (6.7 in)	50 mm (2 in)	910 g (2 lb)	112 g (4 oz)	TNT
SD 1 FRZ	154 mm (6.06 in)	50 mm (2 in)	500 g (1.1 lb)	120 g (4.2 oz)	60/40 Amatol or TNT
SD 2	89 mm (3.5 in)	76 mm (3 in)	1.9 kg (4 lb 4 oz)	210 g (7.5 oz)	TNT
SD 4 HL	31 cm (12.3 in)	91 mm (3.6 in)	4.2 kg (9 lb 4 oz)	340 g (12 oz)	RDX or TNT
SD 10 A Type I	55 cm (21.6 in)	86 mm (3.4 in)	10 kg (22 lb)	900 g (2 lb)	60/40 Amatol or TNT
SD 10 A Type II	55 cm (21.6 in)	86 mm (3.4 in)	10 kg (22 lb)	900 g (2 lb)	60/40 Amatol or TNT
10 kg (P.A) Type I	55 cm (21.5 in)	90 mm (3.54 in)	9.5 kg (21 lb)	1.1 kg (2 lb 8 oz)	70/30 Picric acid/Mononitronaphthalene
10 kg (P.A) Type II	55 cm (21.5 in)	90 mm (3.54 in)	9.5 kg (21 lb)	1.1 kg (2 lb 8 oz)	70/30 Picric acid/Mononitronaphthalene
10 kg (P) Type I	55 cm (21.5 in)	90 mm (3.54 in)	9.5 kg (21 lb)	?	?
10 kg (P) Type II	55 cm (21.5 in)	90 mm (3.54 in)	9.5 kg (21 lb)	?	?
SD 10 C	52 cm (20.5 in)	76 mm (3 in)	7 kg (15 lb)	750 g (1 lb 10 oz)	?

=== SD 1 ===
SD 1 - This was a German light fragmentation bomb that may have been based on German 50 mm mortar ammunition used by the 5 cm Granatwerfer 36 which was modified by adding a new circular 8-fin tail assembly. SD 1 bombs were painted yellow.

=== SD 2 ===
SD 2 - This was a German light anti-personnel bomb nicknamed The Butterfly Bomb due to its appearance. Depending on the fuze used it could be airburst, groundburst or used as a light anti-personnel mine with an anti-disturbance fuze.

=== SD 1 FRZ ===
SD 1 FRZ - This was based on captured 50 mm (2 in) mortar rounds for the Lance Grenades de 50 mm modèle 37 light mortar used by the French Army which was modified by adding a new 6-fin tail assembly. SD 1 FRZ bombs were yellowish-brown in color.

=== SD 4 HL ===
SD 4 HL - This was a German HEAT (High Explosive Anti-Tank) bomb for use against tanks and other vehicles. The HL in the name stands for (Hohlladung) or shaped charge in English. The body of the bomb was cast iron with an inverted metal cone inside and explosives were poured through the base and formed around the cone. The tail was sheet steel and was of a ring strut type with four longitudinal struts spot welded to the ring with each strut forming one tail fin. The tail was then secured to the body by means of four prongs punched into the body of the bomb. On impact, the nose fuze created an electric current which was passed via internal electric leads to the detonator which triggered the gaine and set off the main charge.

=== SD 10 A ===
SD 10 A - Was a German made fragmentation bomb and there were two variants the Type I and Type II. They differed in their construction details but their dimensions and performance were similar.

- Type I - This bomb had a parallel-sided body of cast steel with a thicker nose section that was centrally tapped to hold a nose fuze. There was also a tapered tail cone with 4 tail fins. The bombs were olive green in color with red stripes between the fins.
- Type II - This bomb had both inner and outer drawn steel cases. Between the cases, there were 7 mm (0.28 in) steel cubes that were set in concrete for fragmentation and both shells were scarf jointed together at the nose. There were four steel supports welded between the inner and outer walls of the nose that acted as spacers and the center was tapped to hold a nose fuze. There was also a tapered tail cone with 4 tail fins.

=== SD 10 FRZ ===
SD 10 FRZ - These were French made fragmentation bombs that the Germans captured after the Fall of France. There were two variants comprising two sub-variants. The descriptions in TM 9-1985-6, French and Italian Explosive Ordnance and TM 9-1985-2, German Explosive Ordnance match the 10 kg (P) more closely than the 10 kg (P.A). However, TM 9-1985-6 makes no mention of German service for either bomb and TM 9-1985-2 only has a description with no diagram or mention of the French model designations 10 kg (P) or 10 kg (P.A). Since they had similar dimensions and performance it's possible that they both could have been used.

- 10 kg (P.A) - There were two variants the Type I and Type II. Both had single piece cast steel bodies which were based on modified 90 mm (3.5 in) artillery shells and were centrally threaded for a nose fuze. The bombs were yellow in color.
  - Type I - The tail for this bomb was constructed from riveted sheet metal and was crimped onto two annular grooves in the casing of the bomb.
  - Type II - The tail for this bomb was of cast construction and crimped onto a single annular groove in the casing of the bomb.
- 10 kg (P) - There were two variants of this bomb the Type I and Type II. Both had single piece cast steel bodies which were centrally threaded for a nose fuze. The bombs were yellow in color.
  - Type I - The tail of this bomb was constructed of four sheet metal pressings riveted together, then crimped onto two annular grooves in the casing of the bomb, and reinforced with struts.
  - Type II - The tail of this bomb was constructed of four corrugated sheet metal pressings without bracing that were riveted together then crimped onto two annular grooves in the bomb casing.

=== SD 10 C ===
SD 10C - Was a German made fragmentation bomb that was constructed differently than the SD 10A but its dimensions and performance was similar. The body was constructed of cast steel with 9 annular grooves machined in the case to enhance fragmentation. The nose had a centrally located fuze and the tail was machined to form a base for the tail unit. The tail was then closed by a steel plate shrunk into position and crimped onto four indentations in the body. The tail was made of four sheet metal pressings that were riveted together. The bombs were khaki in color.

== Photo Gallery ==
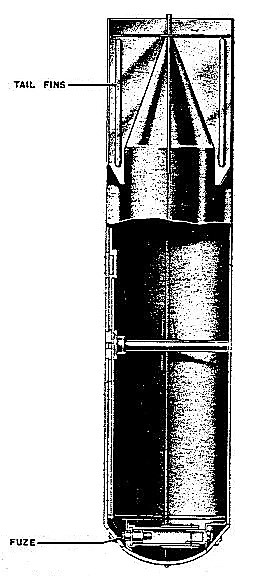
AB 250-2 container schematic.

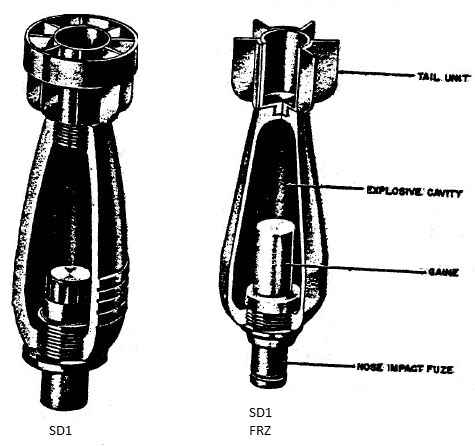
SD 1 and SD 1 FRZ.

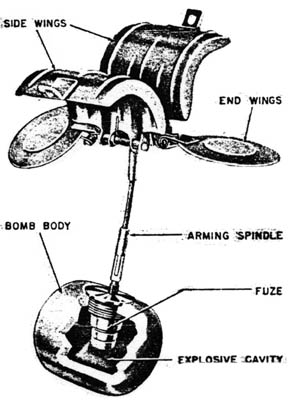
An armed SD 2 bomb.

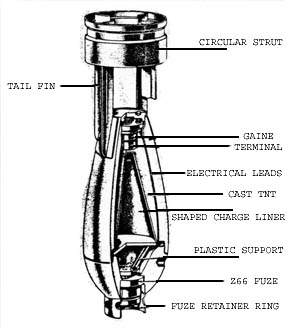
SD 4 anti-tank bomb.

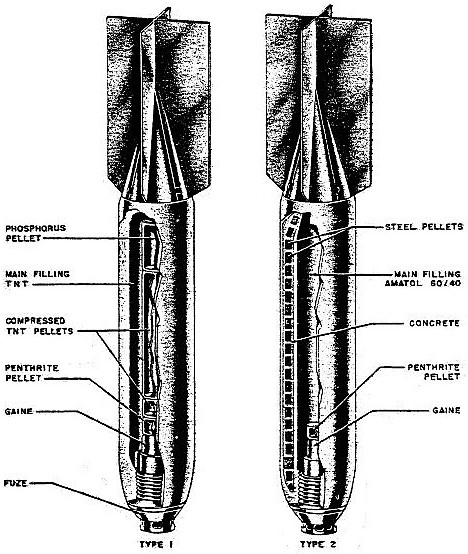
SD 10 A Type I and Type II.

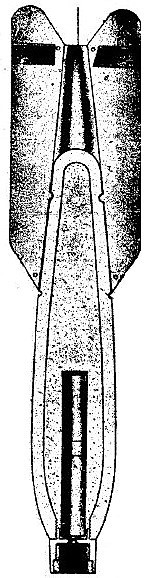
10 kg (P) Type II.

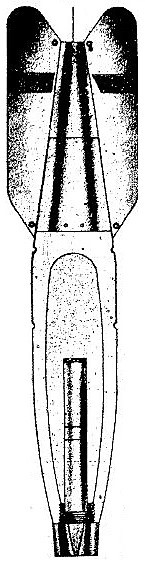
10 kg (P.A) Type I.

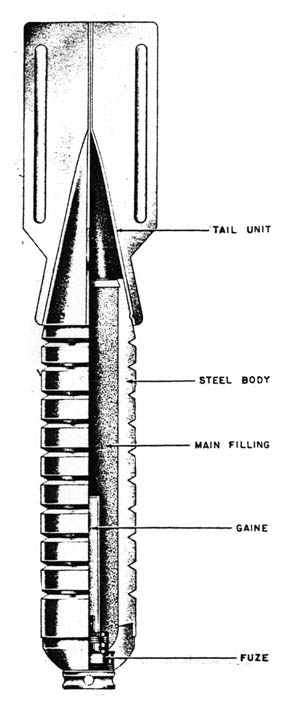
SD 10 C.

== See also ==
- List of weapons of military aircraft of Germany during World War II
