= AB 500-1 =

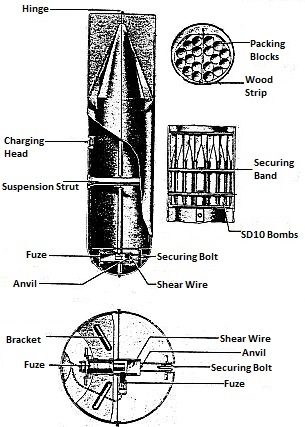
- Type: Cluster bomb
- Place of origin: Nazi Germany

Service history
- Used by: Luftwaffe
- Wars: World War II

Specifications
- Mass: 20 kg (44 lb)
- Length: 2.03 m (6 ft 8 in)
- Diameter: 46 cm (1 ft 6 in)

The AB 500-1 (Abwurfbehälter) was a cluster bomb used by the Luftwaffe during World War II.

== AB 500-1 ==
The body of the AB 500-1 was constructed of mild sheet steel and was of clamshell construction and hinged at the tail. It was carried horizontally in either a bomb bay or on a fuselage or wing hardpoint. The container was divided into three sections; a dome-shaped nose section with dual fuzes, a cylindrical center section which held the bombs, and an empty tail cone with four fins reinforced with struts. About midway, there was a Ladekopf MVOV 500-1 charging head that was welded to the container and in the center of the container, there was a channel for the electric cables which ran from the charging head to the nose fuzes. The two halves of the container were held together by a shear wire which passed through a steel anvil, in the lower part of the fuze pocket. When released an electric charge was sent from the charging head to the fuzes which after a short delay triggered a small exploder under the fuze which sheared the wire holding the container together. The case then opened and allowed the bombs to fall out. The containers were painted khaki.

There were a number of different sub-munition configurations available:

- 28 x SD 10 FRZ - The center compartment held thirteen bombs in the front and fifteen in the rear. The bombs were packed loosely and were not secured by metal bands.
- 37 x SD 10 A - The center compartment was divided into two halves by a plywood sheet. Eighteen bombs were accommodated in the forward half and nineteen bombs in the rear half. Each cluster was secured by steel bands.
- 116 x 2kg incendiaries - Unknown configuration.
- 184 x 1kg incendiaries - Unknown configuration.
- 392 x SD 1 A or SD 1 FRZ - Unknown configuration.

== Sub-munitions ==
Type	Model	Length	Diameter	Weight	Explosive Weight	Explosive
Fragmentation	10kg (P.A) Type I & II	55 cm (21.5 in)	90 mm (3.54 in)	9.5 kg (21 lb)	1.1 kg (2 lb 8 oz)	70/30 Picric acid/Mononitronaphthalene
Fragmentation	10kg (P) Type I & II	55 cm (21.5 in)	90 mm (3.54 in)	9.5 kg (21 lb)	?	?
Fragmentation	SD 10 A Type I & II	55 cm (21.6 in)	86 mm (3.4 in)	10 kg (22 lb)	900 g (2 lb)	60/40 Amatol or TNT
Incendiary	B2 & B2.2	53 cm (21 in)	51 mm (2 in)	2–2.2 kg (4 lb 7 oz – 4 lb 14 oz)	?	Thermite
Incendiary	B1 & B1.3	34 cm (13.5 in)	51 mm (2 in)	1–1.3 kg (2 lb 3 oz – 2 lb 14 oz)	?	Thermite
Fragmentation	SD 1	170 mm (6.7 in)	50 mm (2 in)	910 g (2 lb)	112 g (4 oz)	TNT
Fragmentation	SD 1 FRZ	150 mm (6 in)	50 mm (2 in)	500 g (1.1 lb)	120 g (4.2 oz)	60/40 Amatol or TNT

=== SD 10 FRZ ===
These were French made fragmentation bombs that the Germans captured after the Fall of France. There were two variants comprising two sub-variants. The descriptions in TM 9-1985-6, French and Italian Explosive Ordnance and TM 9-1985-2, German Explosive Ordnance match the 10kg (P) more closely than the 10kg (P.A). However, TM 9-1985-6 makes no mention of German service for either bomb and TM 9-1985-2 only has a description with no diagram or mention of the French model designations 10kg (P) or 10kg (P.A). Since they had similar dimensions and performance it's possible that they both could have been used.

- 10kg (P.A) - There were two variants the Type I and Type II. Both had single piece cast steel bodies which were based on modified 90 mm (3.5 in) artillery shells and were centrally threaded for a nose fuze. The bombs were yellow in color.
  - Type I - The tail for this bomb was constructed from riveted sheet metal and was crimped onto two annular grooves in the casing of the bomb.
  - Type II - The tail for this bomb was of cast construction and crimped onto a single annular groove in the casing of the bomb.
- 10kg (P) - There were two variants of this bomb the Type I and Type II. Both had single piece cast steel bodies which were centrally threaded for a nose fuze. The bombs were yellow in color.
  - Type I - The tail of this bomb was constructed of four sheet metal pressings riveted together, then crimped onto two annular grooves in the casing of the bomb, and reinforced with struts.
  - Type II - The tail of this bomb was constructed of four corrugated sheet metal pressings without bracing that were riveted together then crimped onto two annular grooves in the bomb casing.

=== SD 10 A ===
Was a German made fragmentation bomb and there were two variants the Type I and Type II. They differed in their construction details but their dimensions and performance were similar.

- Type I - This bomb had a parallel-sided body of cast steel with a thicker nose section that was centrally tapped to hold a nose fuze. There was also a tapered tail cone with 4 tail fins. The bombs were olive green in color with red stripes between the fins.
- Type II - This bomb had both inner and outer drawn steel cases. Between the cases, there were 7 mm (0.28 in) steel cubes that were set in concrete for fragmentation and both shells were scarf jointed together at the nose. There were four steel supports welded between the inner and outer walls of the nose that acted as spacers and the center was tapped to hold a nose fuze. There was also a tapered tail cone with 4 tail fins.

=== B2 & B2.2 ===
There were two bombs in this family of incendiaries the 2kg B2EZ and 2.2kg B2.2EZ. The construction details differed from one model to another but their dimensions and performance were similar. Both had cylindrical bodies made from a light alloy called Elektron, had 3 finned sheet metal tail cones with a circular strut, and were filled with thermite. The bodies were painted olive green and tails were dark green.

=== B1 & B1.3 ===
Instead of being one type there was a family of German 1kg and 1.3kg incendiary bombs. Both the 1kg and 1.3kg bombs had the same subvariant designations E, EZA and EZB. The construction details differed from one model to another but their dimensions and performance were similar. Both had cylindrical bodies made from Elektron, had 3 finned sheet metal tail cones with a circular strut, and were filled with thermite. The bodies were unpainted and tails were painted dark green.

=== SD 1 ===
This was a German light fragmentation bomb that may have been based on German 50 mm mortar ammunition used by the 5 cm Granatwerfer 36 which was modified by adding a new circular 8-fin tail assembly. SD 1 bombs were painted yellow.

=== SD 1 FRZ ===
This was based on captured 50 mm (2 in) mortar rounds for the Lance Grenades de 50 mm modèle 37 light mortar used by the French Army which was modified by adding a new 6-fin tail assembly. SD 1 FRZ bombs were yellowish-brown in color.

== Gallery ==
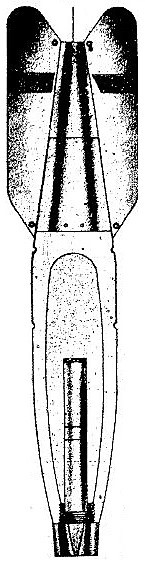
10kg (P.A) Type I.

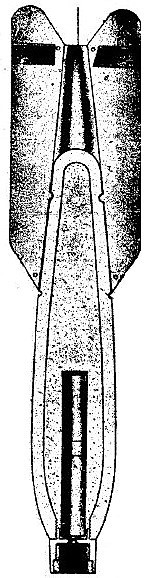
10kg (P) Type II.

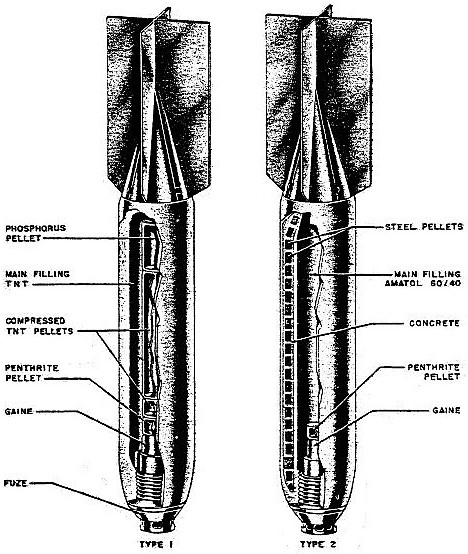
SD 10 A Type I and Type II.

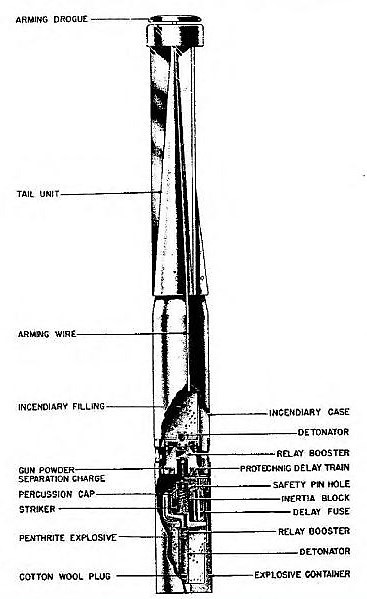
B2EZ 2kg incendiary

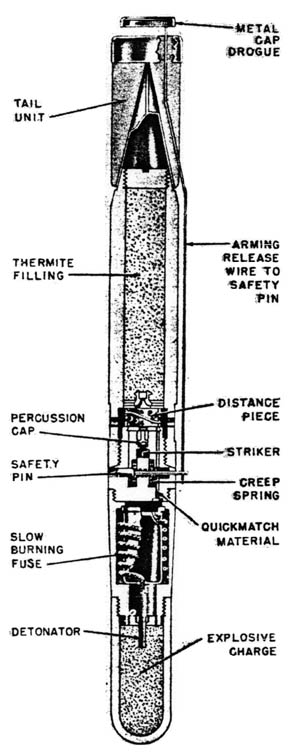
B2.2EZ 2.2kg incendiary.

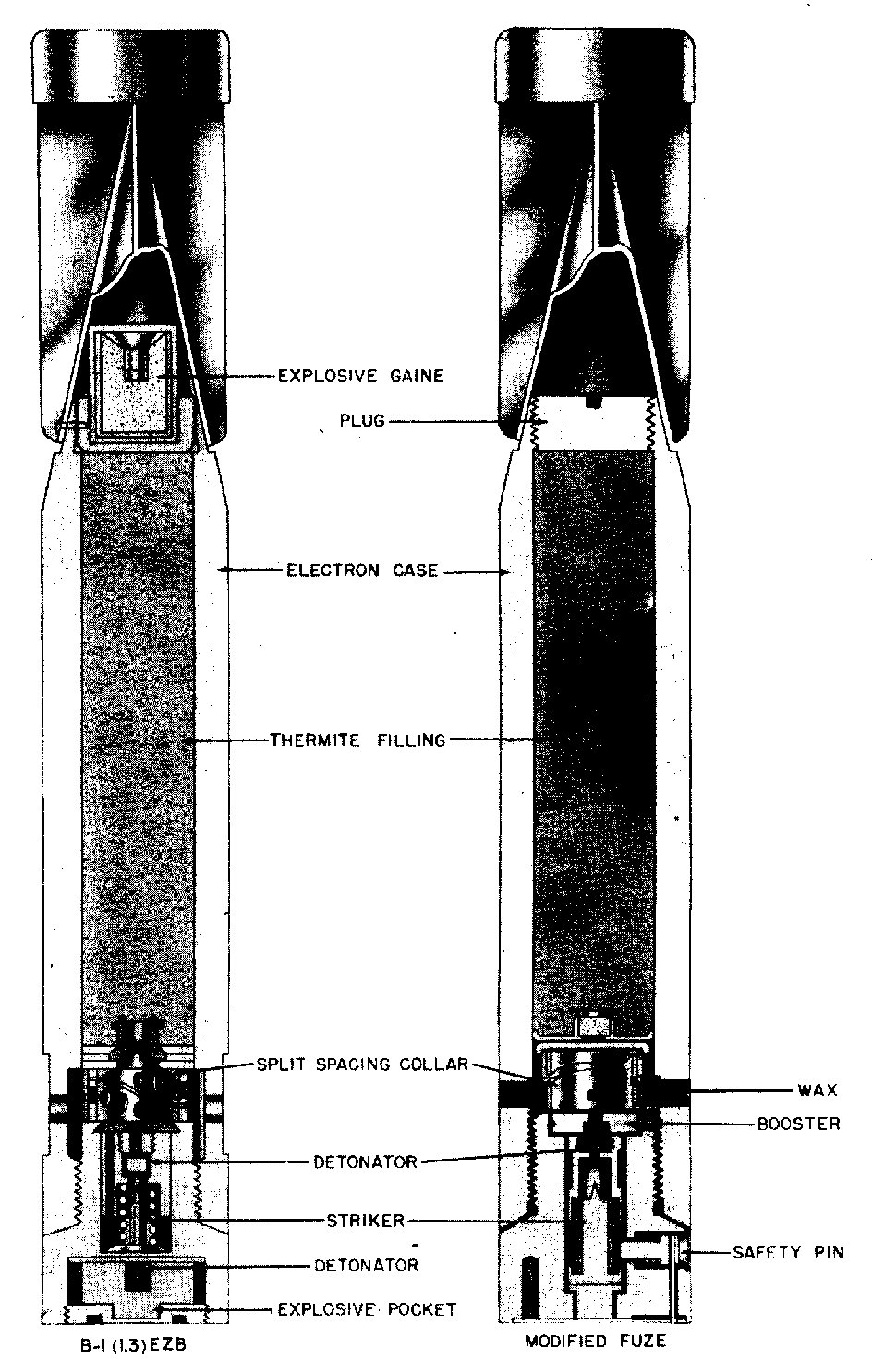
B1EZB 1kg incendiary.

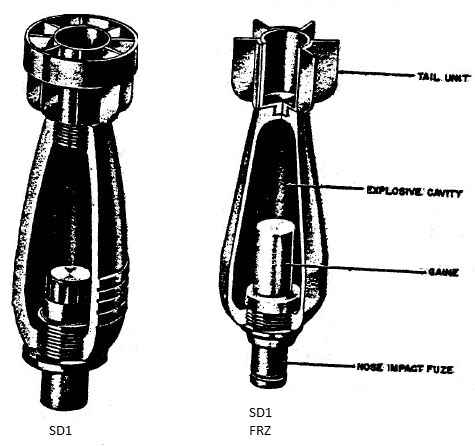
SD 1 and SD 1 FRZ.

== See also ==
- List of weapons of military aircraft of Germany during World War II
