= AB 500-3A =

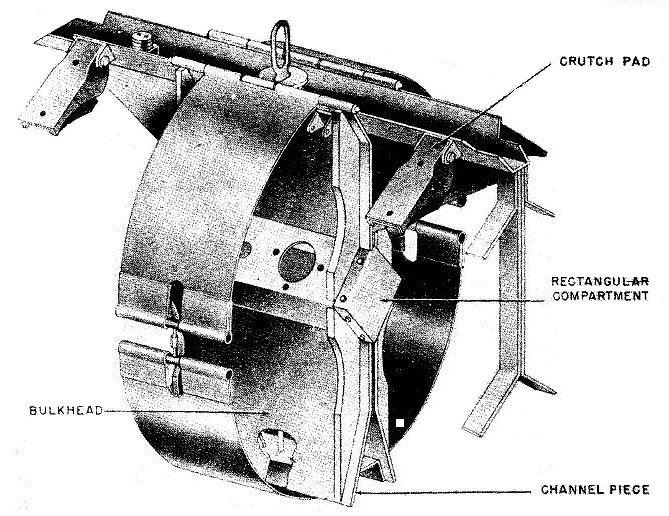
- Type: Cluster bomb
- Place of origin: Nazi Germany

Service history
- Used by: Luftwaffe
- Wars: World War II

Specifications
- Mass: 20 kg (44 lb)
- Length: 79 cm (2 ft 7 in)
- Width: 41–43 cm (16–17 in)

The AB 500-3A (Abwurfbehälter) was a cluster bomb used by the Luftwaffe during World War II.

== Design ==
=== AB 500-3A ===
The AB 500-3A was a cluster bomb container which held four bombs together horizontally. In the center of the container, there was a horizontal beam that attached to the aircraft and this beam had crutch pads at both ends to help balance the bombs. In the center of the beam, there was an adjustable circular metallic band that was divided into two U-shaped sections. The band had tensioner screws which could be used to adjust the diameter of the band and saddle-shaped wooden shims were used to seat the bombs securely within the band. There was a vertical bulkhead which ran through the center of the beam and the adjustable band which housed a rectangular compartment that housed the cables needed for arming the Rheinmetall electric fuzes used by the German SD series of bombs. Near the front of the container, there was also a post which looked two inverted Y's that was used to arm the mechanical fuzes of French bombs which could also be dispensed from the container. When the container was released an electric delay fuze was triggered and after the container had cleared the aircraft the tension on the belt was released and the fuzes on the bombs were armed. The bombs separated as they fell giving a tighter pattern than by dropping the bombs in a stick.

Four different bomb configurations were possible:

- 4 x SD 50 bombs
- 4 x SD 70 bombs
- 4 x French 50kg bombs
- 4 x French 100kg bombs

== Bomb data ==
Model	Length	Diameter	Weight	Explosive Weight	Explosive	Charge/Weight Ratio
SD 50	1.09 m (3 ft 7 in)	20 cm (8 in)	55 kg (121 lb)	16.4 kg (36 lb)	TNT	30%
SD 70	1.09 m (3 ft 7 in)	20 cm (8 in)	66 kg (146 lb)	21 kg (46 lb)	TNT	39%
50kg (A) G.P. - H.E.	0.99 m (3 ft 3 in)	155 mm (6.1 in)	40 kg (88 lb)	10.0 kg (22 lb)	Melinite	25%
50kg (D.T. No.2) G.P. - H.E.	1.17 m (3 ft 10 in)	20 cm (7.7 in)	56 kg (123 lb)	19 kg (42 lb)	Melinite	34%
100kg G.P. - H.E.	1.45 m (4 ft 9 in)	28 cm (11 in)	117 kg (258 lb)	?	Melinite	?

== German bombs ==
The SD (Sprengbombe Dickwandig) or thick walled explosive bomb in English was a German fragmentation bomb used by the Luftwaffe during World War II. The number in the bombs designation corresponded to the approximate weight of the bomb in kilograms.

=== SD 50 ===
- SD 50 - The body of the SD 50 was of one piece cast and machined steel construction. The bombs were filled with explosives through the base. The body had one transverse fuze pocket just forward of the horizontal carrying lug. The SD 50 was painted dark green and the tail cone was striped with red.

=== SD 70 ===
- SD 70 - The construction details for the heavier SD 70 were largely the same as the SD 50. The SD 70 was painted gray and the tail cone was striped with red.

== French bombs ==
The German's captured large amounts of ordnance after the Fall of France and put these to use. The exact models of the French-made bombs mentioned in TM 9-1985-2, German Explosive Ordnance for the AB 500-3A are not known and there were no German designations given or diagrams of the bombs either. However, the German naming standard for captured ordnance tended to be based on what the closest German equivalent was plus FRZ to denote that it was a French bomb which would make the bombs SD 50 FRZ and SD 100 FRZ. It is possible to narrow down the models of French bombs used from TM 9-1985-6, French and Italian Explosive Ordnance because not all of the 50kg and 100kg bombs were nose fuzed and the AB 500-3A had an arming system for mechanical nose fuzes.

=== SD 50 FRZ ===
- 50kg (A) G.P. - H.E. - This was a G.P. (general purpose) H.E (high explosive) bomb. The body was made of forged steel and was based on 155 mm (6.1 in) artillery projectiles. It was filled with Melinite which was a blend of 80% picric acid and 20% dinitronapthalene. It was fitted with a sheet steel tail cone with four fins. The nose of the projectile was threaded for a mechanical nose fuze and the bombs were painted yellow.
- 50kg (D.T. No.2) G.P. - H.E. - This was a general purpose high explosive bomb. The body was made of forged steel and was fitted with a sheet steel tail cone with four braced fins. It was filled with Melinite and the nose of the projectile was threaded for a mechanical nose fuze. The bombs were painted yellow.

=== SD 100 FRZ ===
- 100kg G.P. - H.E. - This was a general purpose high explosive bomb. The body was made of forged steel and was fitted with a sheet steel tail cone with four braced fins. It was filled with Melinite and the nose of the projectile was threaded for a mechanical nose fuze. The bombs were painted yellow.

== Photo Gallery ==
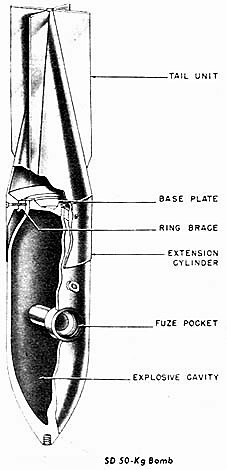
SD 50

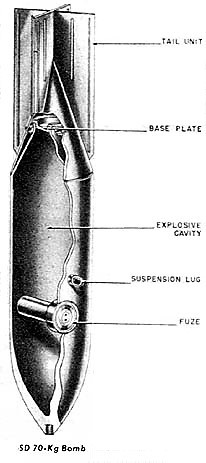
SD 70

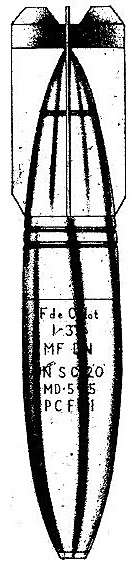
50kg (A) G.P. - H.E.

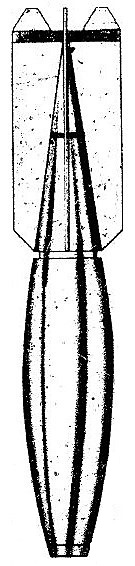
50kg (D.T. No.2) G.P. - H.E.

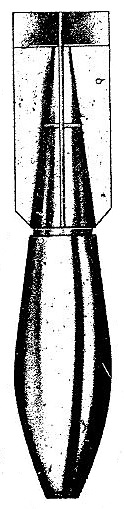
100kg G.P. - H.E.

== See also ==
- List of weapons of military aircraft of Germany during World War II
