= AB 70-D1 =

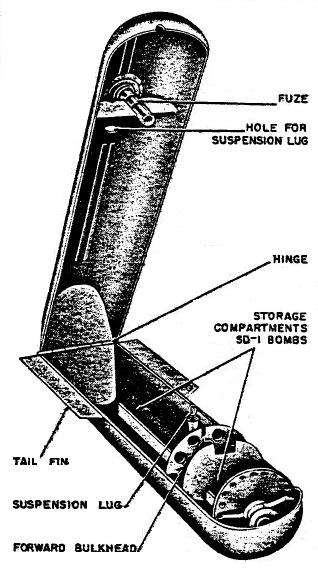
- AB 70-D1 Cluster bomb dispenser
- Type: Cluster bomb
- Place of origin: Nazi Germany

Service history
- Used by: Luftwaffe
- Wars: World War II

Specifications
- Mass: AB 70-D1: 56 kg (123 lb); SD 1: 910 g (2 lb); SD 1 FRZ: 500 g (1.1 lb)
- Length: AB 70-D1: 1.105 m (3 ft 7.5 in); SD 1: 170 mm (6.7 in); SD 1 FRZ: 154 mm (6.06 in)
- Diameter: AB 70-D1: 203 mm (8 in); SD 1 and SD 1 FRZ: 50 mm (2 in)
- Warhead: Amatol or TNT
- Warhead weight: SD 1: 112 g (4 oz); SD 1 FRZ: 120 g (4.2 oz)
- Detonation mechanism: Nose fuze
- Blast yield: 50 sub-munitions

The AB 70-D1 (Abwurfbehälter) was a cluster bomb dispenser used by the Luftwaffe during World War II.

== Design ==
=== Weapons container ===
The AB 70-D1 contained fifty high-explosive fragmentation sub-munitions, was cylindrical in shape and was made of cast steel. The body was of clamshell design with an upper and lower half with tail fins that was hinged at the rear of the container. The base and head of the container were internally threaded and the base of the container had a suspension lug and the nose had a steel closing plug with a fuze.

The container could be suspended either vertically or horizontally within a bomb bay or horizontally from a hard point beneath the fuselage or wing of an aircraft. Attached to the suspension lug there was a cord tied to a split ring which attached to a parachute. When the bomb was dropped the parachute deployed which set off a friction igniter that threaded into the steel closing plug. The closing plug was sheared by the explosion of a small detonator the case opened and the bombs fell out. German documentation states that the AB 70-D1 is not entirely safe in transport and aircraft are not permitted to land with unused AB 70-D1 containers. It is also impossible to jettison the AB 70-D1 in a safe unused state for recovery and the minimum height of bomb release was 150 m (490 ft).

=== Sub-munitions ===
Two types of sub-munitions could be dispensed from the AB 70-D1 one was the German SD 1 and the other was the French SD 1 FRZ. The SD 1 FRZ was based on captured 50 mm (2 in) mortar rounds for the Lance Grenades de 50 mm modèle 37 light mortar used by the French Army which was modified by adding a new 6-fin tail assembly. While the German SD 1 may have been based on German 50 mm mortar rounds used by the 5 cm Granatwerfer 36 which was modified by adding a new shrouded 8-fin tail assembly. At the front of the AB 70-D1 there was one cluster of ten bombs that were held together by a metallic band and in the rear section, there were another four clusters of ten bombs also held together by metallic bands. The bombs were packed nose to tail with the tail cup of each bomb forming a safety device for the nose fuze of the bomb behind it. Both bomb types were loaded in the same manner. SD 1 bombs were yellow and SD 1 FRZ bombs were yellowish-brown in color.

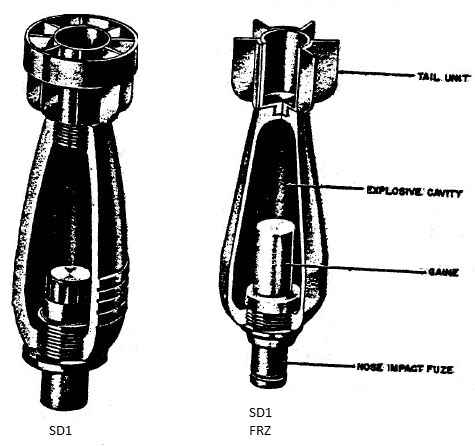
SD 1 and SD 1 FRZ sub-munitions

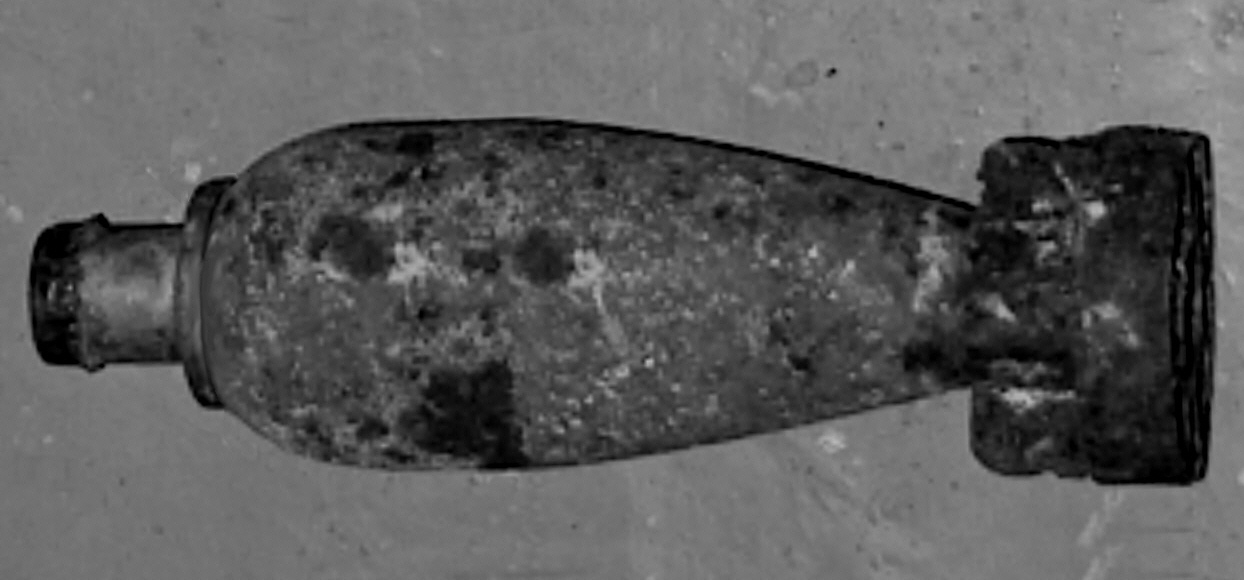
A surviving German SD 1 sub-munition

== See also ==
- List of weapons of military aircraft of Germany during World War II
