= SD 70 (bomb) =

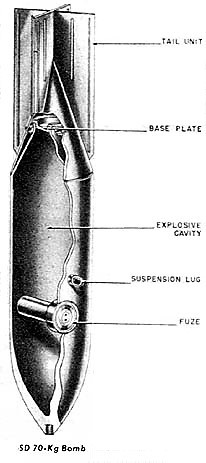
- Type: Fragmentation bomb
- Place of origin: Nazi Germany

Service history
- Used by: Luftwaffe
- Wars: World War II

Production history
- Variants: Parachute

Specifications
- Mass: 66 kg (146 lb)
- Length: 1.09 m (3 ft 7 in)
- Diameter: 203 mm (8 in)
- Warhead: TNT
- Warhead weight: 21 kg (46 lb)

The SD 70 (Sprengbombe Dickwandig 70) or thick walled explosive bomb in English was a fragmentation bomb used by the Luftwaffe during World War II.

== History ==
The second most used category of bombs was the SD series which were high-explosive bombs but with thicker casings which meant their charge to weight ratio was only 30 to 40% of their total weight. At first glance, they were difficult to distinguish from the SC series of bombs, but the two series were color-coded the SC series having yellow tail stripes, while the SD series had red tail stripes. Bombs in this series were the SD 1, SD 1 FRZ, SD 2, SD 10 A, SD 10 FRZ, SD 10 C, SD 15, SD 50, SD 70, SD 250, SD 500, SD 1400, and SD 1700. The number in the bombs designation corresponded to the approximate weight of the bomb.

The SD series was used primarily in two roles that were determined by the type of fuze and accessories fitted to the bomb. The first was as a fragmentation bomb with instantaneous fuze and when the bombs exploded above ground the case created large fragments which would kill enemy personnel and destroy unarmored vehicles. The second role was as a general-purpose or armor-piercing role. In this role, the bombs were fitted with a time delay fuze which detonated the bomb after it had pierced a target destroying it with a combination of its blast and fragments.

== Design ==
The body of the SD 70 was of one piece cast and machined steel construction. The body had one transverse fuze pocket just forward of the horizontal carrying lug. Around the nose of the bomb, there was often a kopfring - a metal ring, triangular in cross-section, designed to prevent ground penetration. In addition to the kopfring a 61 cm (2 ft) dinort rod could be added to obtain pre-penetration detonation for anti-personnel use. The SD 70 was filled through the base and was fitted with a welded sheet steel tail cone with ribbed tail fins. The SD 70 could also be fitted with a parachute and a time fuze for an air-burst anti-personnel role. To accomplish this the tail unit was removed and a sheet metal cylinder 46 cm (18 in) long and 19.7 cm (7.75 in) in diameter was attached to the base of bomb. This cylinder contained a red lattice parachute 1.5 m (5 ft) square with four double shroud lines which attached to the base of the bomb. The SD 70 could be vertically or horizontally suspended in a bomb bay or horizontally mounted on a wing or fuselage hardpoint. The SD 70 was painted gray and the tail cone was striped with red.

== See also ==
- List of weapons of military aircraft of Germany during World War II

== Gallery ==
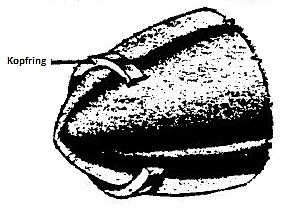
Kopfring.

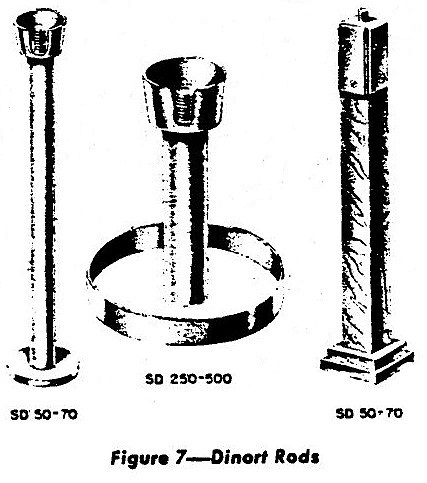
Dinort rods.
