= PD 500 =

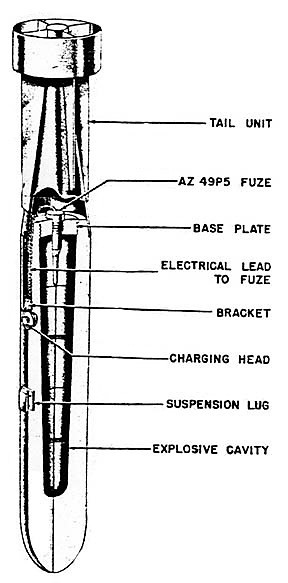
- Type: Armor-piercing bomb
- Place of origin: Nazi Germany

Service history
- Used by: Luftwaffe
- Wars: World War II

Specifications
- Mass: 500 kg (1,100 lb)
- Length: 2.11 m (6 ft 11 in)
- Diameter: 279 mm (11 in)
- Warhead: RDX
- Warhead weight: 32 kg (71 lb)

The PD 500 (Panzersprengbombe Dickwandig) or thick walled armor-piercing explosive bomb in English was an armor-piercing bomb used by the Luftwaffe during World War II.

== Design ==
The PD series of bombs differed for the SC series because they had thick cases for enhanced penetration of armored targets like warships. The charge-to-weight ratio of the bomb was low at only 6.3%, while most general-purpose bombs had a charge-to-weight ratio of between 30 and 50%. The body was of two-piece drawn-steel construction which was filled through the base with RDX and was fitted with a magnesium alloy 4 finned tail with a cylindrical strut. A single electric fuze was located in the base, and an electrical charging head was located in the rear 1/3 of the body. The PD 500 was horizontally suspended by an H-Type suspension lug in a bomb bay or fuselage hardpoint. It was dropped in horizontal flight from a height of at least 11,500 ft (3,500 m), and penetration was stated to be 5.5–6.25 in (140–159 mm). The bombs were painted sky blue with red stripes on the tail.

== See also ==
- List of weapons of military aircraft of Germany during World War II
