= SC2500 bomb =

SC 2500
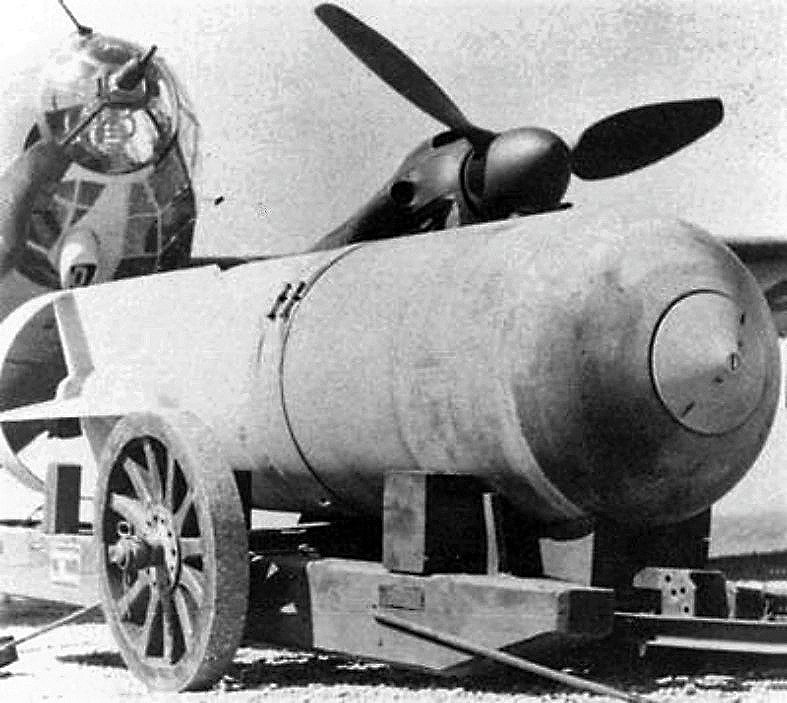
- A Heinkel He 111H/P with an SC 2500 bomb in 1940.
- Type: General-purpose bomb
- Place of origin: Germany

Service history
- Used by: Luftwaffe
- Wars: World War II

Specifications
- Mass: 2,400 kg (5,300 lb)
- Length: 3.91 m (12 ft 10 in)
- Diameter: 813 mm (32 in)
- Warhead: Trialen

The SC 2500 (Sprengbombe- Cylindrisch 2500 : "cylindrical explosive bomb 2500" in English) was a powerful general-purpose bomb used by the Luftwaffe during World War II.

== Design ==
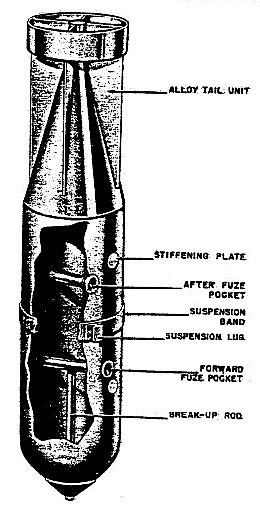
Schematic of SC2500 components.

The SC 2500 had a single piece machined aluminium body with a welded nose piece. Around the nose of the bomb was a kopfring - a metal ring, triangular in cross-section, designed to prevent ground penetration or to stop forward momentum when hitting the water. The SC 2500 also had a circular braced tail ring with four fins. The SC 2500 was similar in construction to the SB 2500 and the main difference between the two was the SB 2500's case was made of steel. There were two transverse fuzes one in the nose and one near the tail. The nose fuse had a centrally located break-up rod that crushed the nose fuze on impact triggering the explosives. The SC 2500 was filled with Trialen 105, a mixture of 15% RDX, 70% TNT and 15% aluminium powder. Externally there was a reinforced H-type suspension band and the bomb could be horizontally suspended in a bomb bay or horizontally mounted on a fuselage hardpoint. The bomb could not be dropped in a safe state and it was advised to not drop the bomb in low level attacks.
