= AB 500-1B =

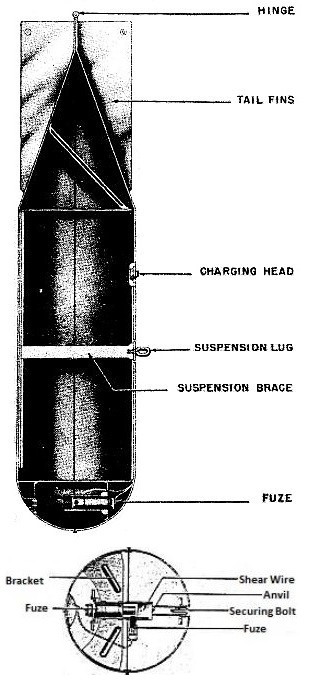
- Type: Cluster bomb
- Place of origin: Nazi Germany

Service history
- Used by: Luftwaffe
- Wars: World War II

Specifications
- Mass: 20 kg (44 lb)
- Length: 2.03 m (6 ft 8 in)
- Diameter: 46 cm (1 ft 6 in)

The AB 500-1B (Abwurfbehälter) was a cluster bomb used by the Luftwaffe during World War II.

== AB 500-1B ==
The body of the AB 500-1B was constructed of mild sheet steel and was of clamshell construction and hinged at the tail. It was carried horizontally in either a bomb bay or on a fuselage or wing hardpoint. The container was divided into three sections; a dome-shaped nose section with dual fuzes, a cylindrical center section which held the bombs, and an empty tail cone with four fins reinforced with struts. About midway, there was a Ladekopf MVOV 500-1 charging head that was welded to the container and in the center of the container, there was a channel for the electric cables which ran from the charging head to the nose fuzes. The two halves of the container were held together by a shear wire which passed through a steel anvil, in the lower part of the fuze pocket. The center compartment held 13 SD 10 FRZ bombs in the front while the rear compartment held 15 SD 10 FRZ bombs. The bombs were packed loosely and were not secured by metal bands. When released an electric charge was sent from the charging head to the fuzes which after a short delay triggered a small exploder under the fuze which sheared the wire holding the container together. The case then opened and allowed the bombs to fall out. The containers were painted khaki.

== SD 10 FRZ ==
| Model | Length | Diameter | Weight | Explosive Weight | Explosive |
|---|---|---|---|---|---|
| 10kg (P.A) Type I | 55 cm (21.5 in) | 90 mm (3.54 in) | 9.5 kg (21 lb) | 1.1 kg (2 lb 8 oz) | 70/30 Picric acid/Mononitronaphthalene |
| 10kg (P.A) Type II | 55 cm (21.5 in) | 90 mm (3.54 in) | 9.5 kg (21 lb) | 1.1 kg (2 lb 8 oz) | 70/30 Picric acid/Mononitronaphthalene |
| 10kg (P) Type I | 55 cm (21.5 in) | 90 mm (3.54 in) | 9.5 kg (21 lb) | ? | ? |
| 10kg (P) Type II | 55 cm (21.5 in) | 90 mm (3.54 in) | 9.5 kg (21 lb) | ? | ? |

SD 10 FRZ - These were French made fragmentation bombs that the German's captured after the Fall of France. There were two variants comprising two sub-variants. The descriptions in TM 9-1985-6, French and Italian Explosive Ordnance and TM 9-1985-2, German Explosive Ordnance match the 10kg (P) more closely than the 10kg (P.A). However, TM 9-1985-6 makes no mention of German service for either bomb and TM 9-1985-2 only has a description with no diagram or mention of the French model designations 10kg (P) or 10kg (P.A). Since they had similar dimensions and performance it's possible that they both could have been used.

- 10kg (P.A) - There were two variants the Type I and Type II. Both had single piece cast steel bodies which were based on modified 90 mm (3.5 in) artillery shells and were centrally threaded for a nose fuze. The bombs were yellow in color.
  - Type I - The tail for this bomb was constructed from riveted sheet metal and was crimped onto two annular grooves in the casing of the bomb.
  - Type II - The tail for this bomb was of cast construction and crimped onto a single annular groove in the casing of the bomb.
- 10kg (P) - There were two variants of this bomb the Type I and Type II. Both had single piece cast steel bodies which were centrally threaded for a nose fuze. The bombs were yellow in color.
  - Type I - The tail of this bomb was constructed of four sheet metal pressings riveted together, then crimped onto two annular grooves in the casing of the bomb, and reinforced with struts.
  - Type II - The tail of this bomb was constructed of four corrugated sheet metal pressings without bracing that were riveted together then crimped onto two annular grooves in the bomb casing.

== Photo Gallery ==
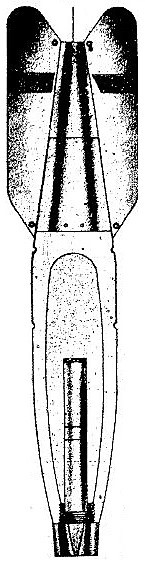
10kg (P.A) Type I.

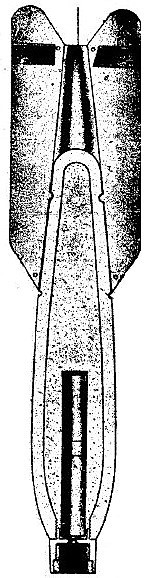
10kg (P) Type II.

== See also ==
- List of weapons of military aircraft of Germany during World War II
