= SD 15 (bomb) =

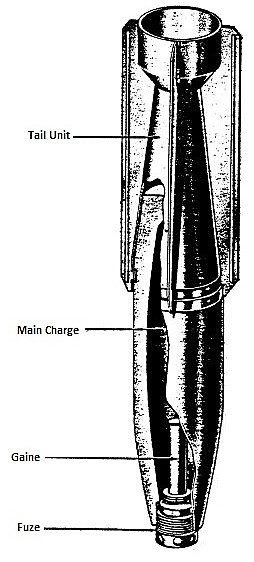
- Type: Fragmentation bomb
- Place of origin: Nazi Germany

Service history
- Used by: Luftwaffe
- Wars: World War II

Specifications
- Mass: 15 kg (33 lb)
- Length: 61 cm (2 ft)
- Diameter: 105 mm (4.1 in)
- Warhead: TNT
- Warhead weight: 4.07 kg (9 lb)

The SD 15 (Sprengbombe Dickwandig) or thick walled explosive bomb in English was a fragmentation bomb used by the Luftwaffe during World War II.

== History ==
The second most used category of bombs was the SD series which were high-explosive bombs but with thicker casings which meant their charge to weight ratio was only 30 to 40% of their total weight. Bombs in this series were the SD 1, SD 1 FRZ, SD 2, SD 10 A, SD 10 FRZ, SD 10 C, SD 15, SD 50, SD 70, SD 250, SD 500, SD 1400, and SD 1700. The number in the bombs designation corresponded to the approximate weight of the bomb.

== Design ==
The body of the SD 15 was of one piece cast steel construction and was a conversion of high-explosive projectiles used by the 10.5 cm leFH 18 howitzers of the German Army. The bomb was filled through the nose with TNT and was internally threaded for a nose fuze. The tail cone was composed of four sheet steel sections that were welded together and crimped into an annular groove machined in the rear 1/3 of the projectile. The SD 15 was used as a sub-munition and 24 could be carried by the AB 500-1D cluster bomb. The body was painted dark green with a khaki colored tail.

== See also ==
- List of weapons of military aircraft of Germany during World War II
