= SBe 50 =

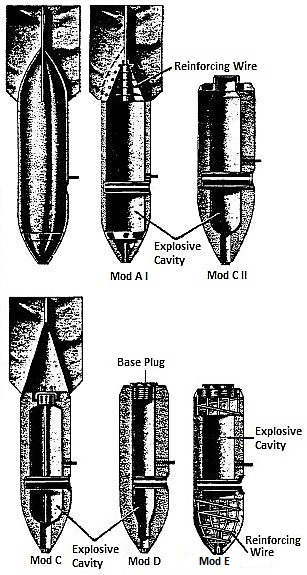
- Type: Fragmentation bomb
- Place of origin: Nazi Germany

Service history
- Used by: Luftwaffe
- Wars: World War II

Production history
- Variants: A I, A II, C, C II, D, E

Specifications
- Mass: 49–52 kg (108–115 lb)
- Length: 1.09 m (3 ft 7 in)
- Diameter: 8 in (200 mm)
- Warhead: TNT; Naphthalene
- Warhead weight: 3–5.4 kg (6 lb 10 oz – 11 lb 14 oz)

The SBe 50 (Splitter Beton) or concrete fragmentation in English was a family of fragmentation bombs used by the Luftwaffe during World War II.

== History ==
The SBe series of bombs were designed to be semi-armor piercing fragmentation bombs that could act as an adjunct to the SD series of bombs. There were two bombs in this series the SBe 50, and the SBe 250. The number in the bombs designation corresponded to the approximate weight of the bomb. The SBe series was an effort to balance low cost, good fragmentation, and effective explosives. The SBe series achieved its fragmentation by embedding scrap metal in a layer of concrete instead of having a thick steel casing like the SD series. This concept had already been used successfully on the SD 10 A Type II and the SD 10 DW.

== Design ==
The SBe 50 wasn't a single type but six closely related sub-variants intended to rectify shortcomings in the original design. None of the models were considered completely successful. The explosive for the Model A I was contained in a thin metal liner which the concrete was cast around. However, the Model A I was not satisfactory because the explosive charge was too large which pulverized the concrete instead of creating effective fragments. The Model C unsuccessfully attempted to address this problem by reducing the amount of explosives and increasing the thickness of the concrete. The Model D reduced the amount of explosive once again and increased the thickness of the concrete but the explosive charge was now too small. The Model E increased the amount of explosives back up to the amount used by the Model C, the internal metal container was eliminated, and the concrete was now cast around a rebar framework. The early models were filled with TNT but later models were filled with naphthalene a lower grade explosive that may have been used to promote fragmentation. Early models had sheet steel tails set in concrete while later models had detachable tails. The SBe 50 could be suspended vertically in a bomb bay or horizontally from a wing or fuselage hard point. The bombs were painted bright green in color.

== See also ==
- List of weapons of military aircraft of Germany during World War II
