= List of weapons of military aircraft of Germany during World War II =

During World War II, the Luftwaffe (German air force) equipped their aircraft with the most modern weaponry available until resources grew scarce later in the war.

== Machine guns ==
(Maschinengewehr)

- MG 15
- MG 17
- MG 81 & 81Z
- MG 131

== Autocannon ==
(Maschinenkanone and related types)

- MG FF and FF/M ^{[1]}
- MG 151, /15 or /20 ^{[1]}
- MK 101
- MK 103
- MK 108

^{[1]} The official designation for MG FF and MG 151 was Maschinengewehr but they are cannon.

== Heavy aircraft cannon ==
(Bordkanone)

- BK 3.7
- BK 5
- BK 7.5 (based on Rheinmetall's 7.5 cm Pak 40 with self-contained twelve-round magazine)

== Rockets and Missiles ==
- Kramer Rk 344, air-to-air missile (liquid-fuel, rocket-powered)
- Henschel Hs 293, guided anti-ship, boost-glide missile
- R4M rocket
- Werfer-Granate 21 heavy-calibre air-to-air unguided rocket

== Bombs ==
=== High explosive ===
"Sprengcylindrisch"' (high-explosive)

- SC 50
- SC 250
- SC 500
- SC 1000 "Hermann"
- SC 1200
- SC 1800 "Satan"
- SC 2000
- SC 2500 "Max"
- SC 500J
- SB 1000
- SB 1800
- SB 2500

=== Anti-personnel ===
"Splitterbomben-Dickwandig"' (Shrapnel)

- SD 1
- SD 1 FRZ
- SD 2
- SD 4 HL
- SD 4/HL RS
- SD 9/HL
- SD 10 A
- SD 10 FRZ
- SD 10 C
- SD 15
- SBe 50
- SD 50
- SD 70
- SBe 250
- SD 250
- SD 500
- SD 1400 "Esau"
- SD 1700 "Sigismund"
- SD 500A
- SD 500E

=== Armour-piercing ===
- SC 10
- SC 10 DW

"Panzersprengbombe-Cylindrisch" (Armor-piercing bombs)

- PC 500* 'Pauline'
- PC 500 RS
- PC 1000* 'Pol'
- PC 1000 RS
- PC 1400 'Fritz' (starting point for the Fritz X gravity precision-guided munition)
- PC 1600
- PC 1800 RS 'Panther'
- PD 500
- PD 1000

=== Cluster bombs ===
- AB 23
- AB 250-2
- AB 250-3
- AB 500-1
- AB 500-1B
- AB 500-3A
- AB 70-D1
- BDC 10

== Prototype only ==
- the Düsenkanone 88 rotary-magazine heavy calibre cannon, meant to largely be recoilless
- Henschel Hs 298, air-to-air missile (rocket-powered)
- Mauser MG 213
- MK 112
- MK 115
- MK 214A cannon
- SG 116 (Link is to german wikipedia page)
- Ruhrstahl X-4
- Jagdfaust

== See also ==
- List of weapons of World War II Japanese aircraft
- Schräge Musik
- List of Luftwaffe air-dropped ordnance
