= SD 1700 =

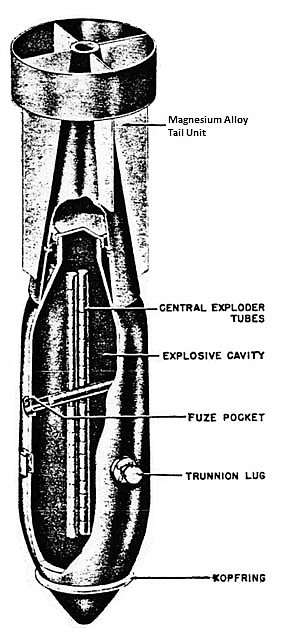
- Type: Fragmentation bomb
- Place of origin: Nazi Germany

Service history
- Used by: Luftwaffe
- Wars: World War II

Specifications
- Mass: 1,703 kg (3,754 lb)
- Length: 3.30 m (10 ft 10 in)
- Diameter: 660 mm (2 ft 2 in)
- Warhead: Amatol; TNT
- Warhead weight: 730 kg (1,610 lb)

The SD 1700 (Sprengbombe Dickwandig 1700) or thick walled explosive bomb in English was a fragmentation bomb used by the Luftwaffe during World War II.

== History ==
The second most used category of German aerial bombs in the Second World War was the SD series which were high-explosive bombs but with thicker casings which meant their charge to weight ratio was only 30 to 40% of their total weight. At first glance, they were difficult to distinguish from the SC series of bombs, but the two series were color-coded, with the SC series having yellow tail stripes, while the SD series had red tail stripes. Bombs in this series were the SD 1, SD 1 FRZ, SD 2, SD 10 A, SD 10 FRZ, SD 10 C, SD 15, SD 50, SD 70, SD 250, SD 500, SD 1400, and SD 1700. The number in the bombs designation corresponded to the approximate weight of the bomb.

The SD series was used primarily in two roles that were determined by the type of fuze and accessories fitted to the bomb. The first was as a fragmentation bomb with instantaneous fuze. When these weapons exploded above ground, the case created large fragments which would kill enemy personnel and destroy unarmored vehicles. The second role was as a general-purpose or armor-piercing role. In this role, the bombs were fitted with a time-delay fuze which detonated the bomb after it had pierced a target, destroying it with a combination of blast and fragmentation.

== Design ==
The body was of one-piece forged steel construction which was filled through the base and was fitted with a magnesium alloy 4 finned tail with a cylindrical strut. Around the nose of the bomb was a kopfring - a metal ring, triangular in cross section, designed to prevent ground penetration or to stop forward momentum when hitting water. A single transverse fuze was located in the middle of the body and two central exploder tubes ran the length of the bomb through the Amatol or TNT filling. The SD 1700 was horizontally suspended by an H-Type suspension lug in a bomb bay or fuselage hardpoint. The bombs were either painted black or sky blue with red stripes on the tail.

== See also ==
- List of weapons of military aircraft of Germany during World War II
