= SB 1000 =

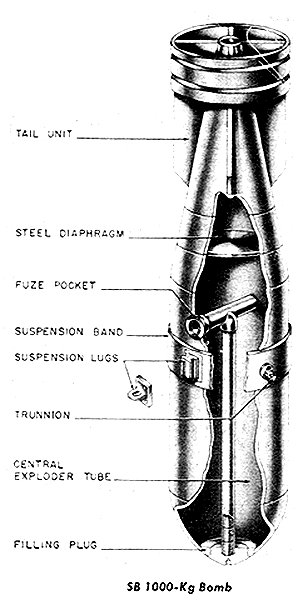
- Schematic of SB 1000 components.
- Type: Luftmine
- Place of origin: Nazi Germany

Service history
- Used by: Luftwaffe
- Wars: World War II

Specifications
- Mass: 1,000 kg (2,200 lb)
- Length: 2.64 m (8 ft 8 in)
- Diameter: 660 mm (26 in)
- Warhead: RDX and Trialen
- Warhead weight: 735 kg (1,620 lb)

The SB 1000 (Spezialbombe) was a luftmine (aerial mine) used by the German Luftwaffe during World War II.

== History ==
The SB series of bombs were high-capacity bombs intended to create the largest lateral blast effect, in contrast to most other German bombs, which were armor-piercing, cluster bombs, fragmentation or incendiaries. Since the SB series was not designed to pierce armor or to create fragments, the casings were very light and the ratio of charge to weight was high at 73%, while most general-purpose bombs were up to 50%.

== Design ==
The SB 1000 had a welded sheet metal body with either a drawn or welded steel nose piece. The nose piece was threaded and was streamlined to reduce drag while the bomb was attached to the aircraft. The SB 1000 had no base plate and was filled through the nose with a central exploder tube which ran through the center of the bomb from the fuze pocket to the nose. The tail of the SB 1000 was constructed of drawn steel and had four fins inside a circular strut. The SB 1000 was suspended horizontally by an H-type lug or trunnions if carried by dive bombers. It was filled with a mixture of RDX biscuits within a Trialen 105 matrix, a mixture of 15% RDX, 70% TNT and 15% aluminium powder. Due to its thin case and powerful explosives, the SB 1000 was vulnerable to enemy gunfire.

== See also ==
- List of weapons of military aircraft of Germany during World War II
