= BDC 10 =

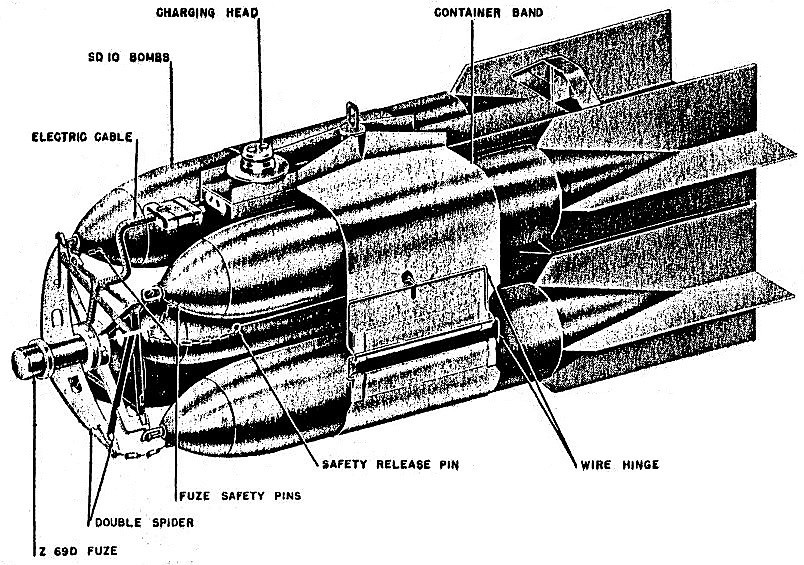
- Type: Cluster bomb
- Place of origin: Nazi Germany

Service history
- Used by: Luftwaffe
- Wars: World War II

The BDC 10 was a cluster bomb used by the Luftwaffe during World War II.

== Design ==
=== BDC 10 ===
The BDC 10 was a cluster bomb unit which held five bombs horizontally together by a metallic band 140 mm (5.5 in) wide, and by a double spider mechanism at the front of the bombs. The inner spider hooked through the suspension lugs at the front of the bombs while the outer spider connected to the bombs safety pins by small chains. The top half of the band attached to a suspension beam and a charging head similar to a Rheinmetall fuze head. An electric cable from the head went to a socket, and this 2-prong socket plugs into the release device. The lower half of the metallic band is attached to the upper by wire hinges held together by two safety pins, one on each side. These pins are attached to the outer arming spider by small chains. The lower half of the band is split and held together by two screws for tightening the band around the bombs during assembly.

On release from the aircraft an electric cap is fired and after a short delay, this ignites a small charge which blows off the spider, which pulled out the bombs safety pins and the safety pins which held the band together. The bombs separate and arm as they fall giving a tighter pattern than by dropping the bombs in a stick.

Two different bomb configurations were possible:

- 5 x SC 10
- 5 x SD 10 A

== Bombs ==
Model	Length	Diameter	Weight	Explosive Weight	Explosive
SC 10	58 cm (23 in)	83 mm (3.25 in)	12 kg (26 lb)	900 g (2 lb)	TNT
SC 10 DW	58 cm (23 in)	83 mm (3.25 in)	12 kg (26 lb)	900 g (2 lb)	TNT
SD 10 A Type I	55 cm (21.6 in)	86 mm (3.4 in)	10 kg (22 lb)	900 g (2 lb)	60/40 Amatol or TNT
SD 10 A Type II	55 cm (21.6 in)	86 mm (3.4 in)	10 kg (22 lb)	900 g (2 lb)	60/40 Amatol or TNT

=== SC 10 ===
SC 10 - Was a German made fragmentation bomb and there were two variants, the SC 10 and SC 10 DW. They differed in their construction details but their dimensions and performance were similar.

- SC 10 - There's relatively little information on this variant in TM 9-1985-2, German Explosive Ordnance other than the case could be forged or cast steel, the base was an integral part of the bomb, and the nose was tapped for a fuze.
- SC 10 DW - This bomb had both inner and outer steel cases. Between the cases, there were steel pellets embedded in concrete for fragmentation and the center was tapped to hold a time delayed nose fuze. There was also a tapered tail cone with 4 tail fins. The SC 10 was similar in construction to the SD 10 A Type II and the DW in the designation stood for (dickwandig) or thick walled in English. The bomb was intended to pierce a target and after a short delay explode destroying the target with shell fragments. The bombs were dark grey in color.

=== SD 10 A ===
SD 10 A - Was a German made fragmentation bomb and there were two variants the Type I and Type II. They differed in their construction details but their dimensions and performance were similar.

- Type I - This bomb had a parallel-sided body of cast steel with a thicker nose section that was centrally tapped to hold a nose fuze. There was also a tapered tail cone with 4 tail fins. The bombs were olive green in color with red stripes between the fins.
- Type II - This bomb had both inner and outer drawn steel cases. Between the cases, there were 7 mm (0.28 in) steel cubes that were set in concrete for fragmentation and both shells were scarf jointed together at the nose. There were four steel supports welded between the inner and outer walls of the nose that acted as spacers and the center was tapped to hold a nose fuze. There was also a tapered tail cone with 4 tail fins.

== Photo Gallery ==
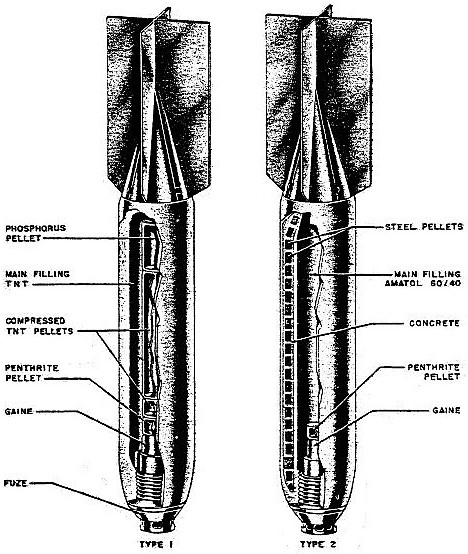
SD 10 A Type I and Type II.

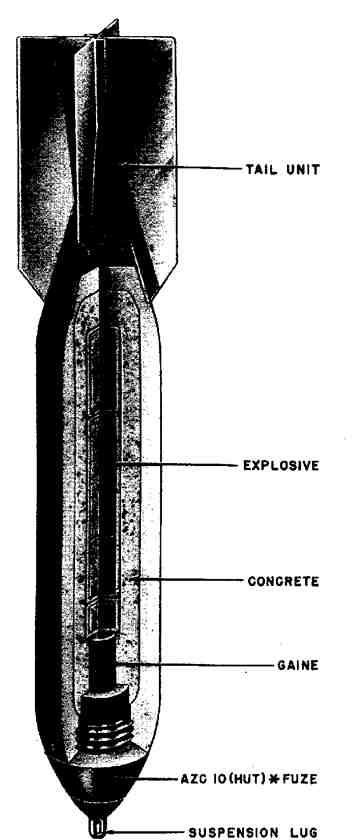
SC 10 DW.

== See also ==
- List of weapons of military aircraft of Germany during World War II
