= SD 50 (bomb) =

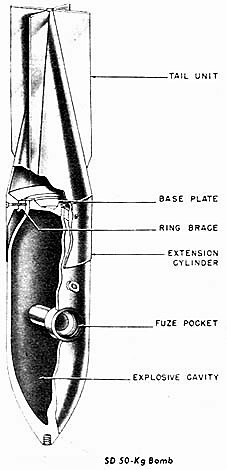
- Type: Fragmentation bomb
- Place of origin: Nazi Germany

Service history
- Used by: Luftwaffe
- Wars: World War II

Production history
- Variants: Type I Type II

Specifications
- Mass: 55 kg (121 lb)
- Length: 1.09 m (3 ft 7 in)
- Diameter: 203 mm (8 in)
- Warhead: TNT
- Warhead weight: 16.4 kg (36 lb)

The SD 50 (Sprengbombe Dickwandig 50) or thick walled explosive bomb in English was a fragmentation bomb used by the Luftwaffe during World War II.

== History ==
The second most used category of bombs was the SD series which were high-explosive bombs but with thicker casings which meant their charge to weight ratio was only 30 to 40% of their total weight. At first glance, they were difficult to distinguish from the SC series of bombs, but the two series were color-coded the SC series having yellow tail stripes, while the SD series had red tail stripes. Bombs in this series were the SD 1, SD 1 FRZ, SD 2, SD 10 A, SD 10 FRZ, SD 10 C, SD 15, SD 50, SD 70, SD 250, SD 500, SD 1400, and SD 1700. The number in the bombs designation corresponded to the approximate weight of the bomb.

The SD series was used primarily in two roles that were determined by the type of fuze and accessories fitted to the bomb. The first was as a fragmentation bomb with instantaneous fuze and when the bombs exploded above ground the case created large fragments which would kill enemy personnel and destroy unarmored vehicles. The second role was as a general-purpose or armor-piercing role. In this role, the bombs were fitted with a time delay fuze which detonated the bomb after it had pierced a target destroying it with a combination of its blast and fragments.

== Design ==
The body of the SD 50 was of one piece cast and machined steel construction. The body had one transverse fuze pocket just forward of the horizontal carrying lug. Around the nose of the bomb there was often a kopfring - a metal ring, triangular in cross section, designed to prevent ground penetration. In addition to the kopfring an anti-ricochet adapter for anti-ship use or a 61 cm (2 ft) dinort rod could be added to obtain pre-penetration detonation for anti-personnel use. The SD 50 was filled through the base and was fitted with either a Type 1 or Type 2 tail assembly. The Type 1 had a cast alloy adapter with sheet steel fins while the Type 2 was a one-piece assembly made of cast magnesium alloy. It could be vertically or horizontally suspended in a bomb bay or horizontally mounted on a wing or fuselage hardpoint. The SD 50 was painted dark green and the tail cone was striped with red.

== See also ==
- List of weapons of military aircraft of Germany during World War II

== Gallery ==
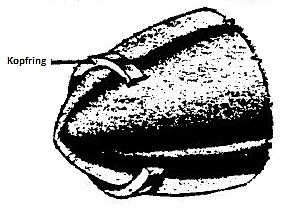
Kopfring.

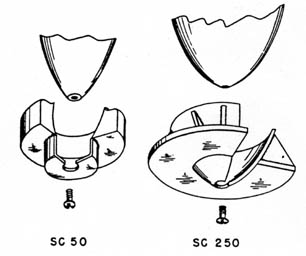
Anti-ricochet rings.

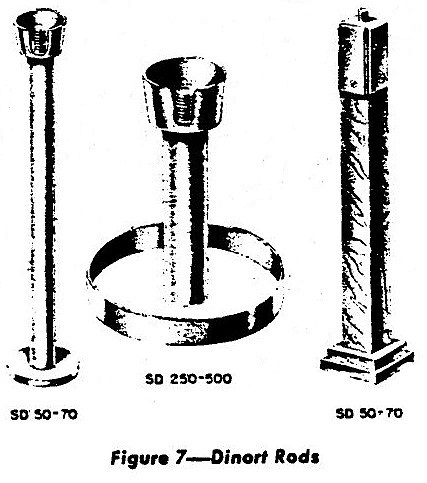
Dinort rods.
