= SD 250 =

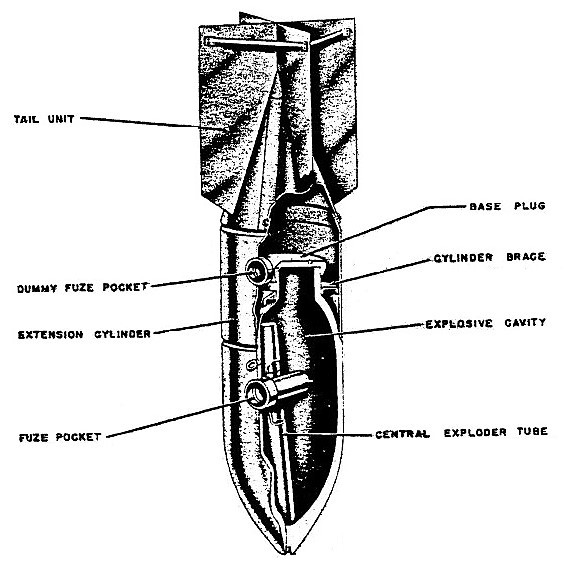
- Type: Fragmentation bomb
- Place of origin: Nazi Germany

Service history
- Used by: Luftwaffe
- Wars: World War II

Production history
- Variants: Parachute

Specifications
- Mass: 250 kg (550 lb)
- Length: 1.65 m (5 ft 5 in)
- Diameter: 368 mm (14.5 in)
- Warhead: Amatol; TNT
- Warhead weight: 79 kg (174 lb)

The SD 250 (Sprengbombe Dickwandig 250) or thick walled explosive bomb in English was a fragmentation bomb used by the Luftwaffe during World War II.

== History ==
The second most used category of bombs was the SD series which were high-explosive bombs but with thicker casings which meant their charge to weight ratio was only 30 to 40% of their total weight. At first glance, they were difficult to distinguish from the SC series of bombs, but the two series were color-coded the SC series having yellow tail stripes, while the SD series had red tail stripes. Bombs in this series were the SD 1, SD 1 FRZ, SD 2, SD 10 A, SD 10 FRZ, SD 10 C, SD 15, SD 50, SD 70, SD 250, SD 500, SD 1400, and SD 1700. The number in the bombs designation corresponded to the approximate weight of the bomb.

The SD series was used primarily in two roles that were determined by the type of fuze and accessories fitted to the bomb. The first was as a fragmentation bomb with instantaneous fuze and when the bombs exploded above ground the case created large fragments which would kill enemy personnel and destroy unarmored vehicles. The second role was as a general-purpose or armor-piercing role. In this role, the bombs were fitted with a time delay fuze which detonated the bomb after it had pierced a target destroying it with a combination of its blast and fragments.

== Design ==
The body of the SD 250 was of three-piece welded construction with a nose piece, center section, and tail sections. The tail cone was of sheet steel construction with four braced tail fins. The SD 250 had a transverse fuze pocket in the nose section, a dummy fuze pocket near the tail, and there was a central exploder tube which ran through 2/3 of the Amatol or TNT filling. The SD 250 was filled through the base and was fitted with a welded sheet steel tail cone with ribbed tail fins. A 38 cm (15 in) dinort rod could be added to obtain pre-penetration detonation for anti-personnel use. The SD 250 could also be fitted with a Hohlladung shaped charge that could be added to the nose of the bomb to increase its armor piercing capabilities. This attachment weighed 4 kg (8.8 lb) and was detonated by its own nose fuze. To prevent damage to the bomb a cap made from cement and sawdust separated the explosive charge from the nose of the bomb. When fitted with this attachment the bomb used a delay fuze to explode the bomb after it had penetrated the target. The SD 250 could be vertically or horizontally suspended in a bomb bay or horizontally mounted on a wing or fuselage hardpoint. The SD 250 was painted dark green, sky blue, or aluminum. The tail cone was striped with red and blue.

== See also ==
- List of weapons of military aircraft of Germany during World War II

== Gallery ==
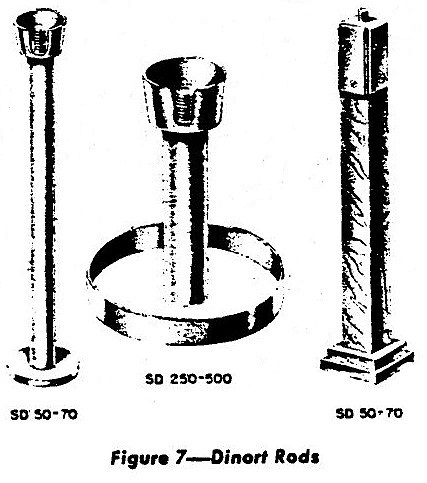
Dinort rods.

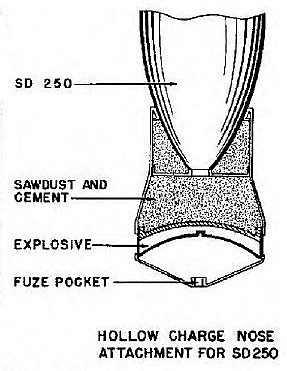
SD 250 Hohlladung.
