= SB 2500 =

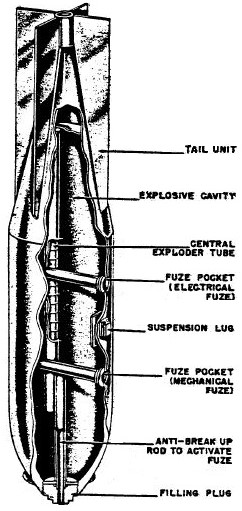
- Schematic of SB 2500 components.
- Type: Luftmine
- Place of origin: Nazi Germany

Service history
- Used by: Luftwaffe
- Wars: World War II

Specifications
- Mass: 2,400 kg (5,300 lb)
- Length: 3.68 m (12 ft 1 in)
- Diameter: 787 mm (31 in)
- Warhead: Amatol or Trialen
- Warhead weight: 1,570 kg (3,460 lb)

The SB 2500 (Spezialbombe) was a luftmine or aerial mine in English. It was used by the Luftwaffe during World War II.

== History ==
The SB series of bombs were designed to be high-capacity bombs that were intended to create the largest lateral blast effect on detonation. This was in contrast to most other German bombs, which were either armor-piercing, cluster bombs, fragmentation or incendiaries. Since the SB series was not designed to pierce armor or to create fragments, the casing of the series was very light, and the ratio of charge to weight was high at 65%, while the majority of general-purpose bombs were up to 50%.

== Design ==
The SB 2500 was constructed of three parts; a threaded cast steel nose plug, a welded sheet steel center section, and a welded sheet steel tail cone with four alloy tail fins. The SB 2500 was filled through the nose and the tail cone was hollow to increase the bombs charge to weight ratio. There were two transverse fuze pockets; the forward pocket housed the anti-break-up fuze and the rear pocket was for a normal impact fuze. The SB 2500 was fitted with an anti-breakup rod which extended from the nose plug to the forward fuse pocket, which on impact crushed the impact fuze and detonated the bomb. A central exploder tube also ran through the center of the bomb from the forward fuze pocket to the tail. The SB 2500 was suspended horizontally by reinforced H-type lugs. The SB 2500 was filled with either Amatol or Trialen 105. Trialen 105 was a mixture of 15% RDX, 70% TNT and 15% aluminum powder. Due to its thin case and powerful explosives, the SB 2500 was vulnerable to enemy gunfire.

== See also ==
- List of weapons of military aircraft of Germany during World War II
