= Lance Grenades de 50 mm modèle 37 =

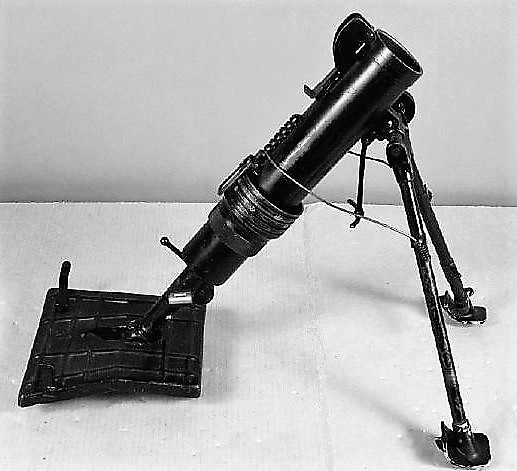
- Type: Infantry mortar
- Place of origin: France

Service history
- Used by: France; Nazi Germany; North Vietnam
- Wars: World War II; First Indochina War

Production history
- Designed: 1937
- Produced: 1939

Specifications
- Mass: 3.6 kg (7 lb 15 oz)
- Barrel length: 415 millimetres (16 in)
- Shell: .43 kg (15 oz)
- Caliber: 50 mm (2.0 in)
- Elevation: +45° fixed
- Traverse: 8°
- Rate of fire: 20 rpm
- Muzzle velocity: 70 m/s (230 ft/s)
- Effective firing range: 70 m (230 ft)
- Maximum firing range: 460 m (1,510 ft)
- Filling: Amatol or TNT
- Filling weight: 120 g (4.2 oz)
- Detonation mechanism: Nose fuze

The Lance Grenades de 50 mm modèle 37 was a French light infantry mortar designed and produced shortly before the Second World War.

== Design ==
The modèle 37 was issued during 1939 to replace rifle grenades in infantry platoons. It was a simple weapon with a fixed elevation of 45°, with the range being set by twisting a ring on the base which varied the diameter of gas vents on the tube. It consisted of a tube, baseplate and bipod. Although light and mobile it was short ranged and fired a small projectile.

After testing in 1937 an initial order for 21,950 mortars was placed in January 1938. This order was later changed to 50,000 mortars at the outbreak of war with all mortars to be completed by January 1941. However, only 2,900 had been produced by June 1940 and few had been put into service due to a shortage of ammunition. Production ceased after the French surrender in 1940 and wasn't resumed until 1944. Those mortars captured by the Germans were given the designation Granatwerfer 203(f) and issued to occupation troops. The modèle 37 remained in the French inventory until the end of the First Indochina War when it was retired.

The VPA used many of these guns, captured from the French and homemade, often equipping companies and battalions.

== Ammunition conversions ==
After the French defeat the Germans converted modèle 37 ammunition to serve as sub-munitions for their AB 70-D1 cluster bombs. The ammunition was given a new tail fin and these sub-munitions were given the German classification SD 1 FRZ. Another German conversion was the Behelfsmine W-1 which consisted of removing the nose fuze and tail fins then adding a Buck chemical crush fuze to the projectile and using it either as a small anti-personnel mine or as a booby trap.

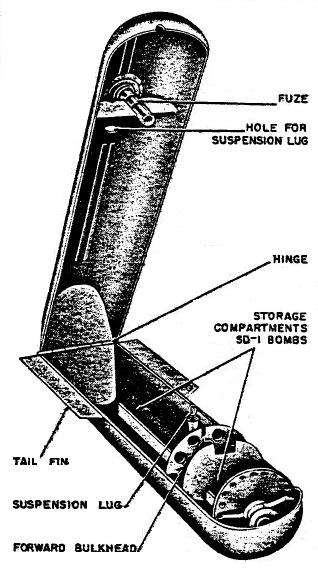
AB 70-D1 cluster bomb dispenser.

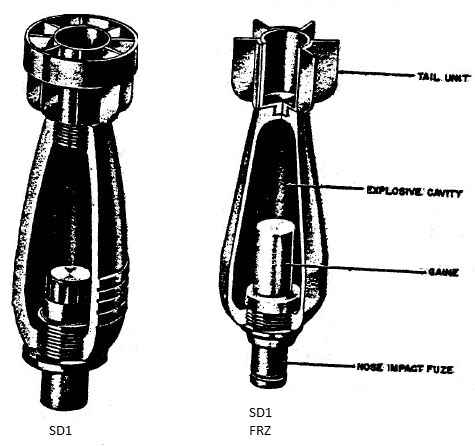
German SD 1 and French SD 1 FRZ sub-munitions.

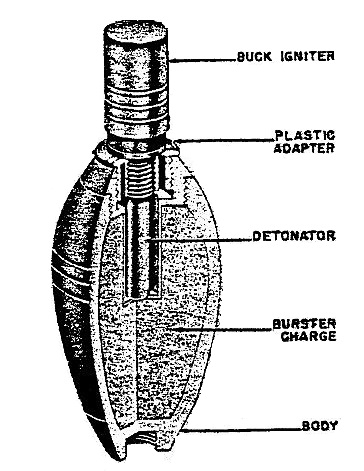
Behelfsmine W-1.jpg

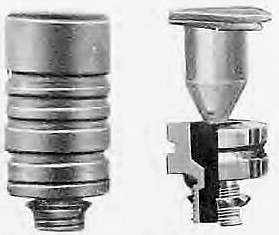
A Buck fuze.

== See also ==
- Video on this mortar
