= 5 cm Granatwerfer 36 =

WW2 German light mortar

Granatwerfer 36
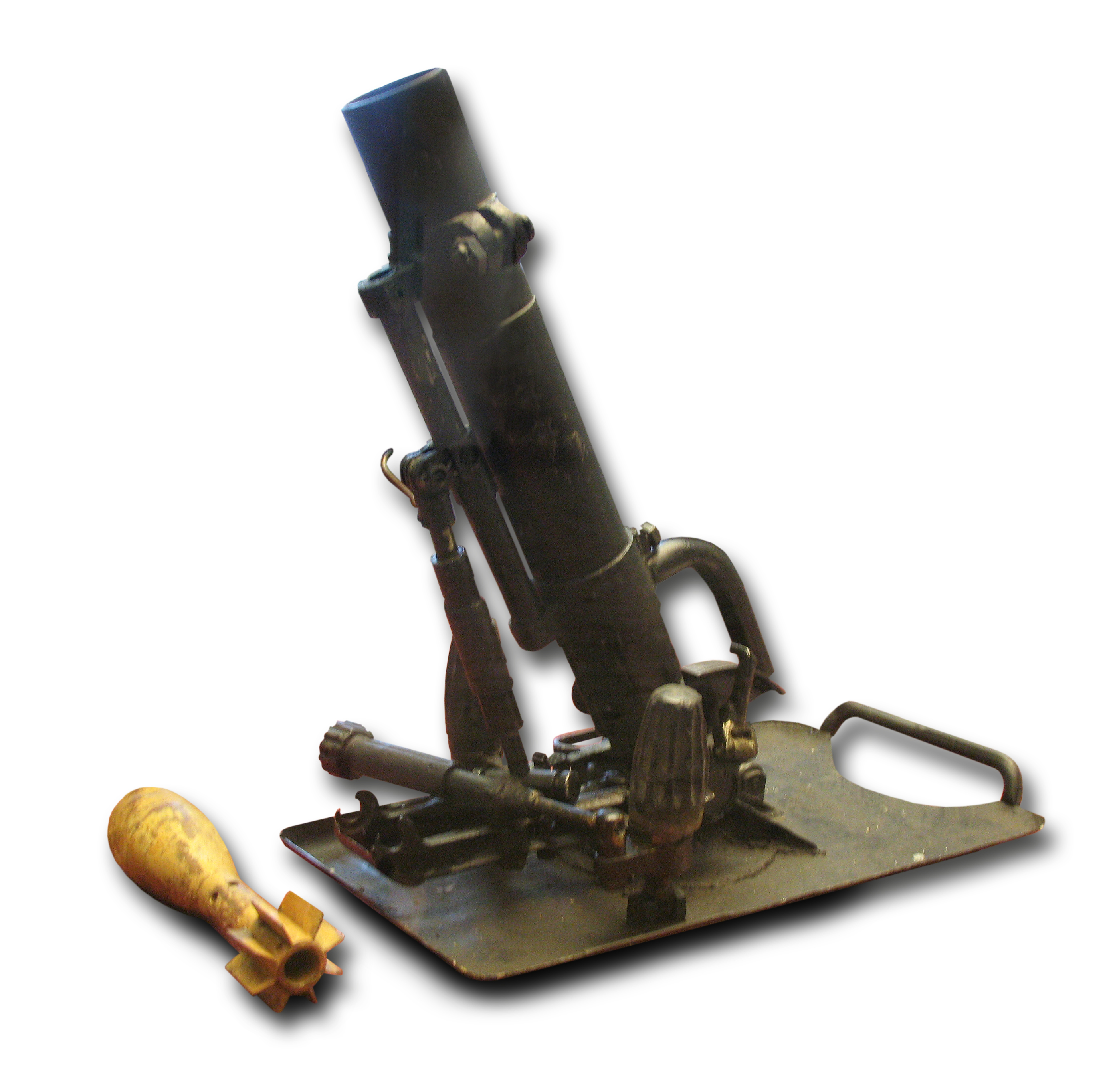
- leGrW 36
- Type: Mortar
- Place of origin: Nazi Germany

Service history
- In service: 1936–1945
- Used by: Wehrmacht; Bulgarian Army; Royal Hungarian Army; Slovak Army (1939–1945)
- Wars: Second World War

Production history
- Designer: Rheinmetall
- Designed: 1934
- Unit cost: 400 RM
- Produced: 1936–1943
- No. built: 31,800

Specifications
- Mass: 14 kg (31 lb)
- Barrel length: 46.5 cm (1 ft 6 in)
- Crew: 2
- Shell: 0.9 kg (2.0 lb) TNT filled
- Caliber: 50 mm (1.97 in)
- Elevation: 42° to 90°
- Traverse: 33° 45'
- Rate of fire: 15-25 rpm
- Muzzle velocity: 75 metres per second (250 ft/s)
- Effective firing range: 50 m (55 yd) min 510 m (560 yd) max
- Maximum firing range: 520 m (570 yd)
- Sights: Telescopic, later none

The 5 cm leichter Granatwerfer 36 (5 cm leGrW 36) was a light mortar used by Nazi Germany during World War II.

== History ==
The mortar's development was started in 1934 by Rheinmetall-Borsig AG and it was adopted for service in 1936. Its intended role was to engage pockets of resistance that were beyond a hand grenade's throwing range. Until 1938, it used a complicated telescopic sight. By 1941, the Granatwerfer 36 was seen as too complex for its intended role, the shell was too light and the range too short. It was used as a platoon mortar and operated by a 3-man team. Production was terminated in 1941. By 1942, it had been gradually withdrawn from front line service. However, it remained in use with second-line and garrison units until the end of the Second World War in 1945. As ammunition stocks for the mortar dwindled during 1944–1945, coupled with the loss of the actual mortars, the Germans often relied on captured French and Soviet 50 mm mortars. The 50 mm continued to be popular for the remainder of the war, simply because it was easily transported by two men, and provided infantry with hitting power and a range capability greater than any other weapon readily available at the squad or section level. A total of 22,112,000 rounds of ammunition were produced for the weapon from 1939 to 1943.
