= Bomb bay =

Compartment to carry bombs on a military aircraft

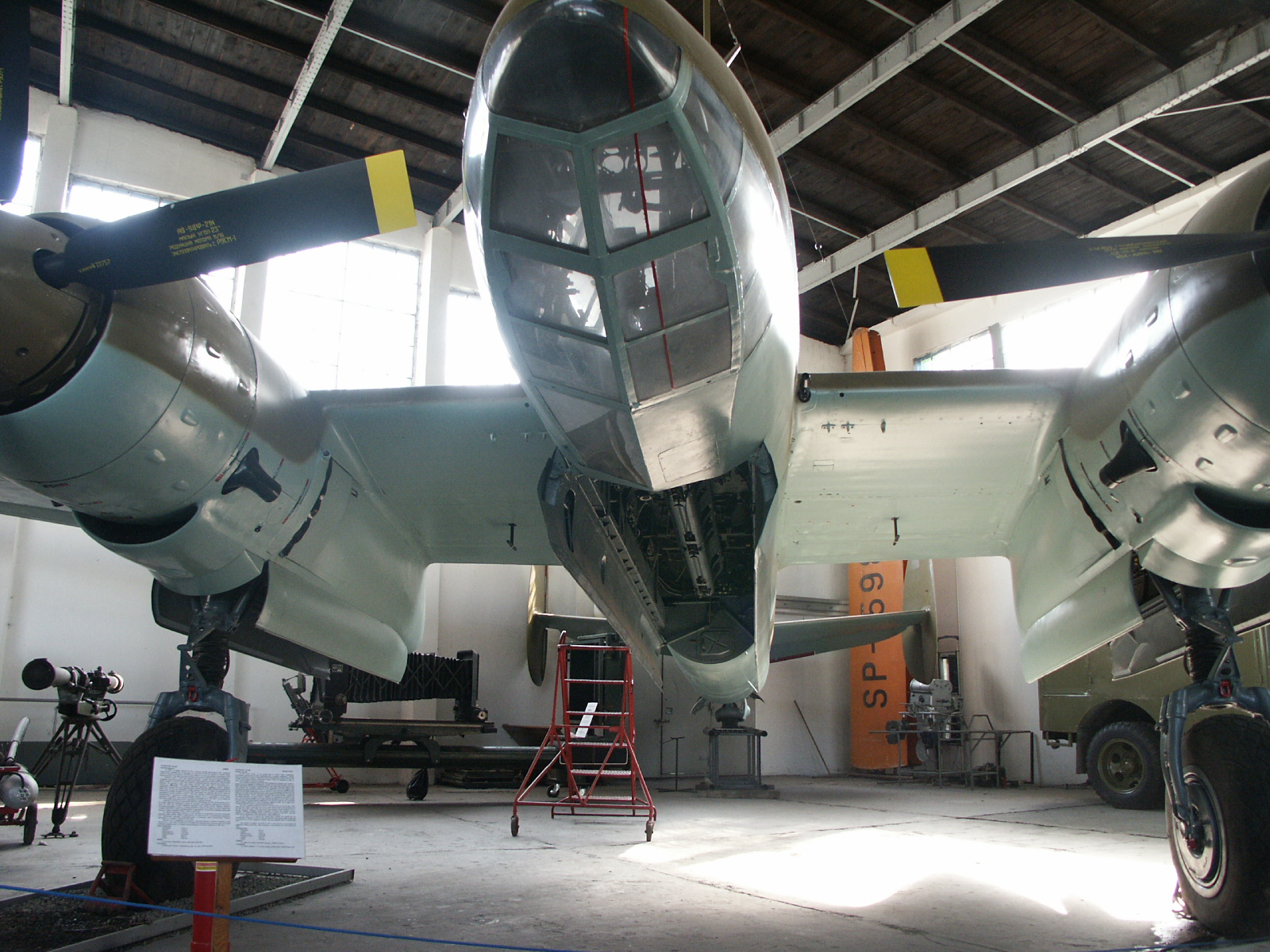
World War II-era bomber Tupolev Tu-2 with a bomb bay open

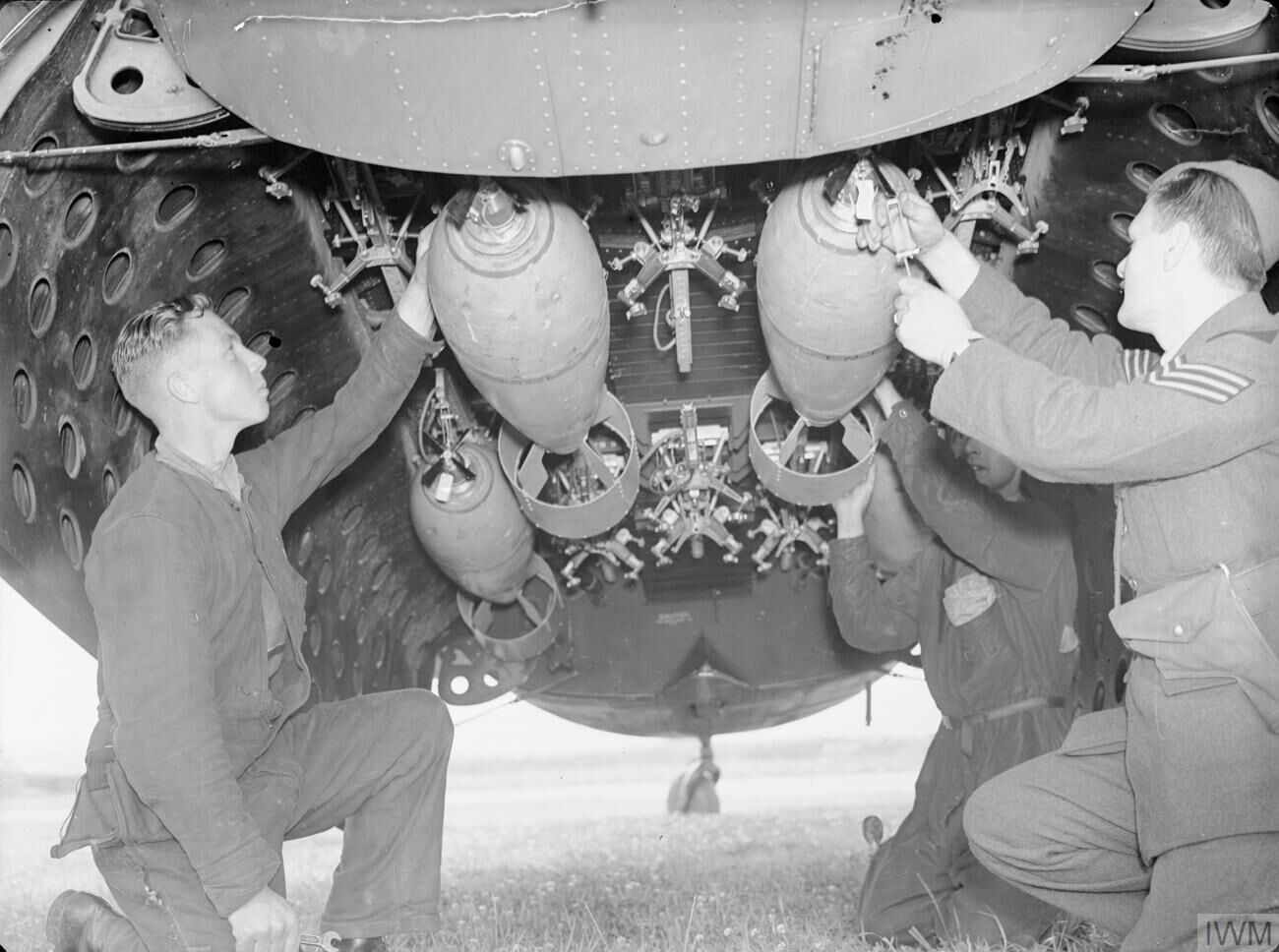
Armourers securing 250 lb (110 kg) general-purpose bombs in a Lockheed Hudson.

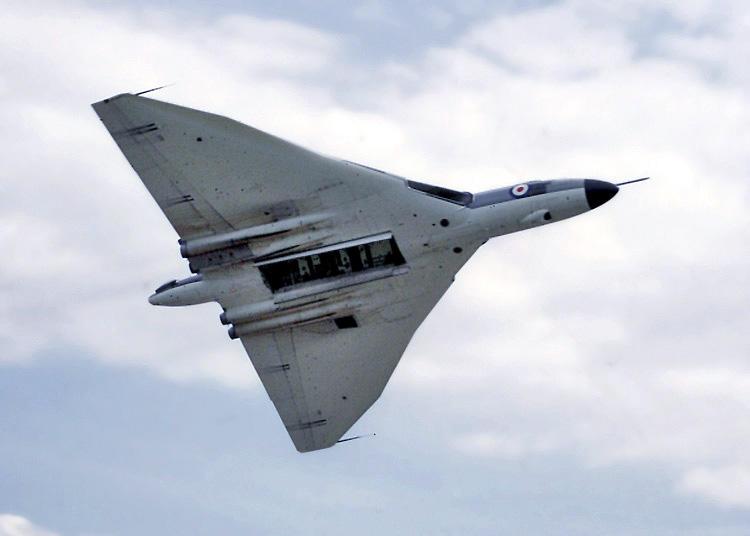
An Avro Vulcan showing its bomb bay open

The bomb bay or weapons bay on some military aircraft is a compartment to carry bombs, usually in the aircraft's fuselage, with "bomb bay doors" which open at the bottom. The bomb bay doors are opened and the bombs are dropped when over the target or at a specified launching point.

== History and function ==
Bomb bays were born of necessity. Early military aircraft suffered severe aerodynamic drag (which would further slow down the already lumbering bomb-laden aircraft) with bombs hanging from the wings or below the fuselage, so military aviation designers moved the bombs inside the aircraft.

Before the introduction of stealth technology, bomb bays were mostly used by dedicated bomber aircraft; in fighters and attack airplanes bombs and rockets were hung from the wings or fuselage on pylons. Notable exceptions are the F-101, F-102 and F-106 interceptor aircraft, all of which had bays used to store missiles, or other weapons stores. Today many designers have moved previously "external" stores into internal multifunction "weapons bays" capable of carrying air-to-air missiles, air-to-ground missiles, drop tanks, and other military "stores" and deploying them rapidly in a battle. The principal reason for the change is to use stealth technology to make aircraft more difficult to detect on radar. Military fighters are now designed to have the smallest possible radar cross-section, which has decreased very substantially since attention was paid to this feature. Large racks of missiles and bombs hanging below the wings return very distinct radar signatures, which can be eliminated by bringing the weapons inside the fuselage. This also improves aerodynamic performance and increases the payload which can be carried and the range of the aircraft. Examples of modern U.S. fighters with weapon bays are the F-117 Nighthawk, F-22 Raptor, and F-35 Lightning II. These stealth aircraft such as the Chengdu J-20 use retractable guided missile launchers which move out on rails, allowing the weapons bay to be closed while the missiles still hang outside.

=== Semi-recessed bomb bay ===
World War II saw the use of semi-recessed bomb bays which, being an uncommon variation of the fully recessed bomb bay, was a design compromise for aircraft that were intended to carry bombs but did not have sufficient fuselage space for a fully recessed bomb bay; such a design did not allow for the inclusion of bomb bay doors. Breda Ba.88, Bristol Beaufort and Douglas TBD Devastator were among the few notable aircraft to use semi-recessed bomb bays.

== Weapons ==
Large-sized bombs, which may be nuclear, are dropped from hook-type releases or bomb cradles. When a bomber carries many smaller bombs (e.g. iron bombs, JDAMs), the bombs are typically loaded onto mechano-electrical devices known as ejector racks, which allow for larger bomb loads to be dropped with greater accuracy.

Guided missiles (frequently standoff missiles) are often carried in the bomb bays of modern aircraft; the missiles are dropped from the aircraft and then accelerate into autonomous flight while the bomber aircraft "stands off" at a safe distance from the target.

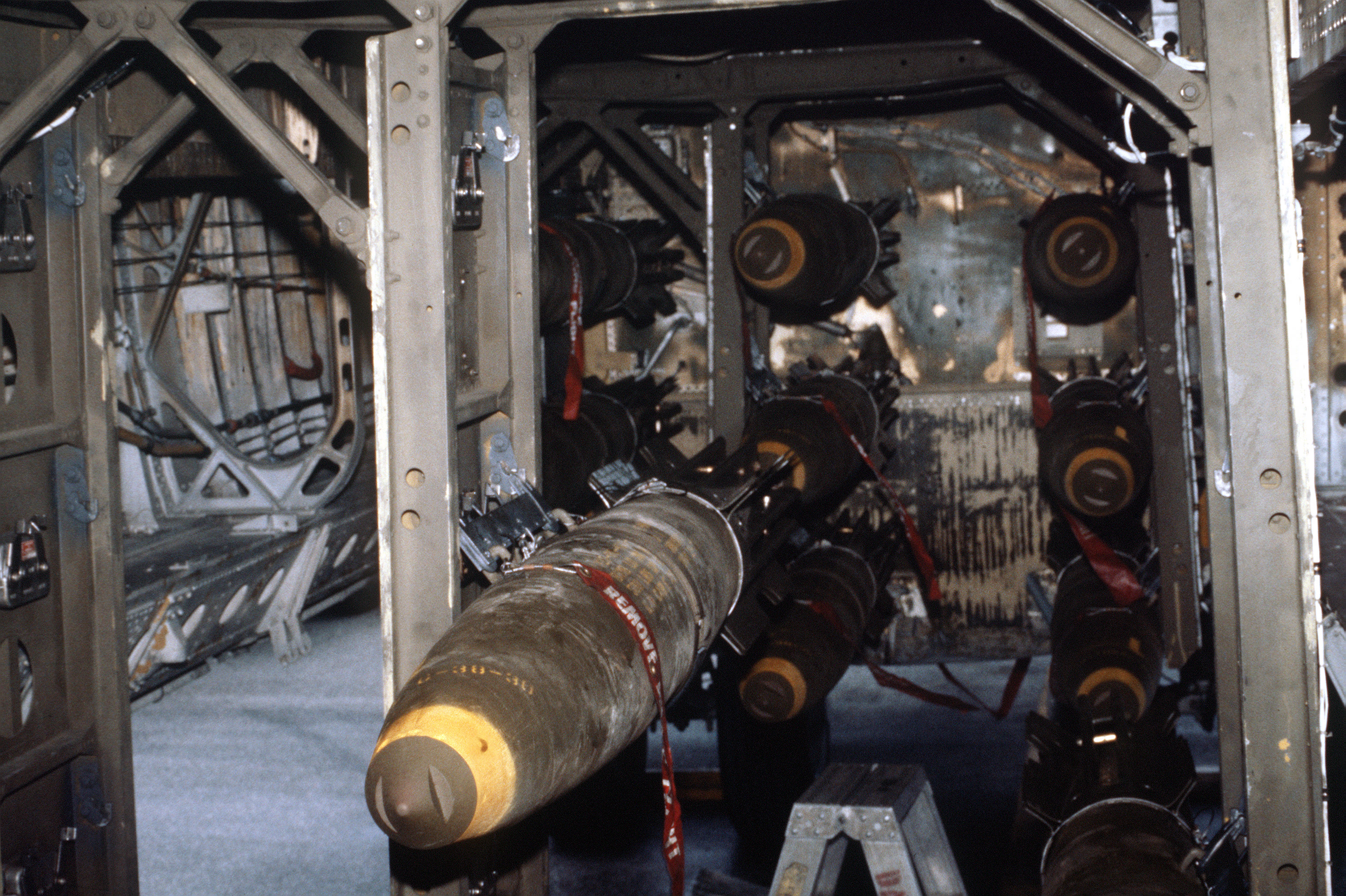
Mark 82 500lb bombs in a B-52G's conventional bomb bay.

There are multiple different bomb bay configurations, which can include:

=== Conventional bomb rack ===
The more traditional, fixed bomb rack, a conventional bomb rack like that of the B-52 would have mounted stores in vertical columns making individual store selection and release impossible without releasing all stores ahead in the column line. The advantage of a conventional bomb rack is a prompt release of all stores in short order. Bombers like the B-52, the B-1 or the B-2 use custom designed bomb rack support structures with their own designation e.g. Common Bomb Rack (CBR), Common Bomb Module (CBM), or Smart Bomb Rack Assembly (SBRA).

These bomb racks may have special store release control mechanisms. Aside from the release options of a rack, a pilot can select release mode for releasing one or multiple stores. Stores can be jettisoned selectively in single mode or ripple mode or salvo mode. The term ripple applies to the single- or ripple and single-continuous release mode from one or from mirror stations. Salvo release mode applies to a combination of several stations together e.g. adjacent stations. For multiple store release, an interval timer can be set to release stores in fixed time steps. For an external store emergency release, there may be a panic button to release all of the weapons.

=== Rotary launcher ===
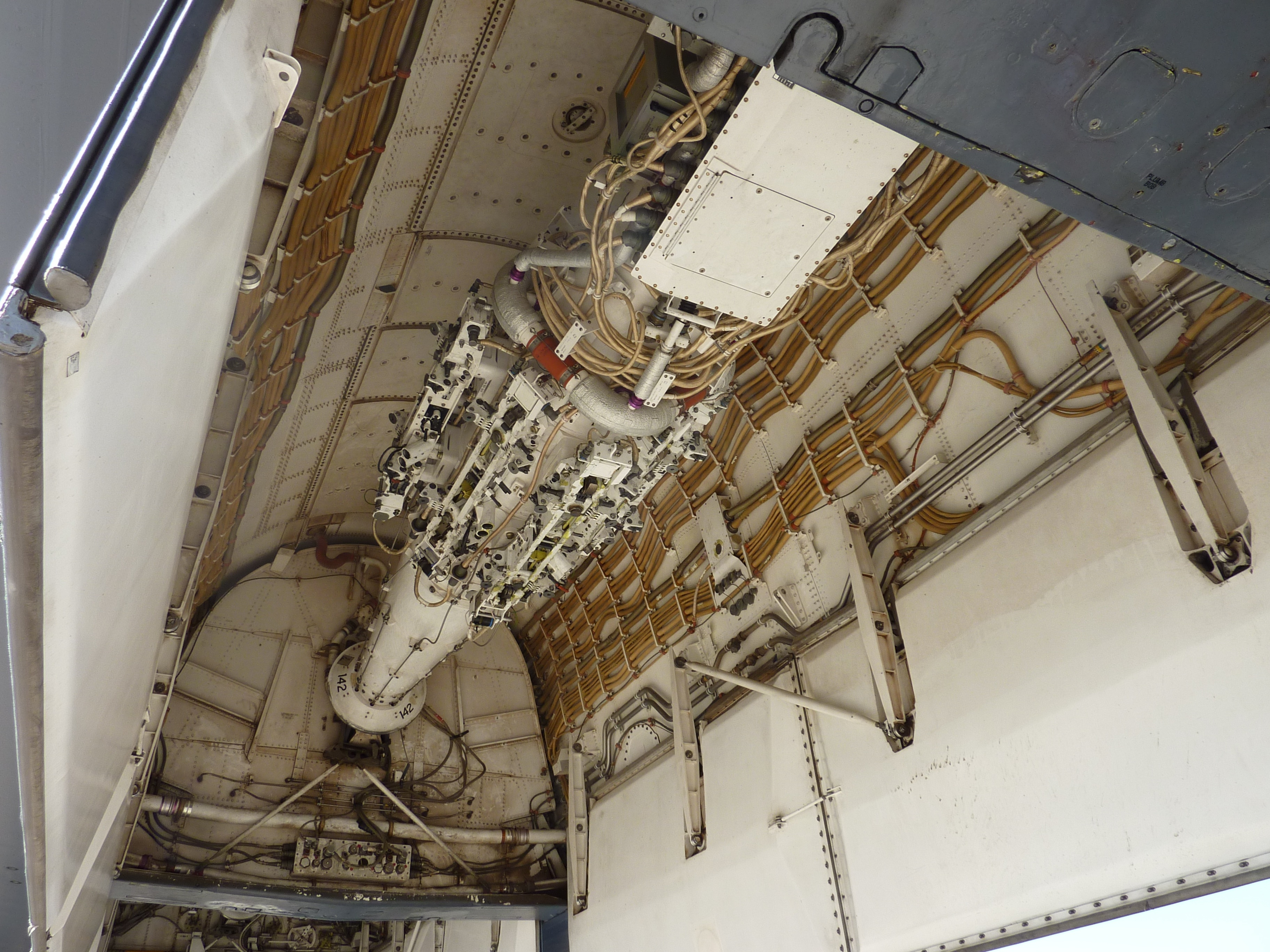
B-1B forward bomb bay fitted with a rotary launcher

A rotary launcher is a rotating suspension equipment mounted inside the bomb bay. Rotary launchers have stations of their own and offer the ability to select certain stores within the bomb bay for release. Advantages include the selection ability for different weapons and easier loading for the ground crew.

The disadvantage of a rotary launcher is a slow release of stores. The rotary launcher of the B-1 for example requires seven seconds until the next store is rotated into release position.

An example of the concept is the Common Strategic Rotary Launcher, which was introduced in the 1980s on the B-52 and B-1B to carry the AGM-69 and AGM-86.

== See also ==
- Hardpoint
