= Firestone Firehawk 600 =

Canceled CART series auto race

CART FedEx Championship Series
- Venue: Texas Motor Speedway
- Location: Fort Worth, Texas, United States
- Corporate sponsor: Firestone
- First race: 2001
- Last race: 2001
- Distance: 372.000 mi (598.676 km)
- Laps: 248

Circuit information
- Length: 1.500 mi (2.414 km)
- Turns: 4

The Firestone Firehawk 600 was a planned American open-wheel car race scheduled for April 29, 2001 at the Texas Motor Speedway in Fort Worth, Texas, United States. The event was sanctioned by Championship Auto Racing Teams (CART) and was the third round of the 2001 CART season. It was scheduled for 248 laps around the 1.5-mile (2.4 km) oval track. However, the race was postponed and ultimately canceled due to concerns about driver safety, as the high g-forces the cars produced through the circuit's long corners (which had 24° of banking) led to drivers experiencing vertigo, vision issues and disorientation during practice and qualifying. Medical experts also voiced concerns of drivers suffering g-force induced loss of consciousness (g-LOC) from the sustained g-forces that would be experienced during a race. It was the only race in CART history that was canceled outright for safety reasons. Kenny Bräck was awarded one point for qualifying on pole position at an average speed of 233.344 miles per hour (375.531 km/h).

== Background ==
The Firestone Firehawk 600 was to be the second attempt to run an open-wheel race on a high-banked oval. Texas Motor Speedway, which opened in 1997, is classified as an intermediate oval with a length of 1.5 miles (2.4 km). The turns are banked at 24°. By comparison, the turns at Indianapolis Motor Speedway are only banked at 9°, and those at Michigan International Speedway are 18°.

Texas Motor Speedway was originally designed with a dual-banking layout. The steep 24° banking on top would accommodate NASCAR races. A secondary 8° banking below was designed for the faster open-wheel machines. While the track was under construction, CART had expressed interest in holding a race at the facility, but upon closer examination of the unusual dual-banking system decided it was not feasible. The secondary banking design was ultimately deemed a failure, and in 1998, the turns were reconfigured. The dual banking was removed in favor of a larger apron, and after unrelated difficulties during the NASCAR events, the turn transitions were corrected.

The rival Indy Racing League (IRL) had run a race at Texas since 1997 (until its discontinuation in 2023), along with a fall race from 1998 to 2004. IRL cars were slower than their CART counterparts (due to their less powerful naturally aspirated engines) and this, combined with a higher downforce chassis, allowed them to handle the steep banking.

After the success of the IRL events, CART expressed renewed interest in holding an event at the track. Over the summer of 2000, negotiations were ongoing, with a tentative date of May 6, 2001 set for the inaugural event. When the 2001 CART schedule was released, the race was scheduled for April 29, 2001, and was set to air live on ABC. However, it was eventually switched to sister network ESPN.

=== Initial concerns ===
The expectations for dangerously high speeds were an early concern, and even led to rumors of cancellation or moving the race to the infield road course. Unlike their IRL counterparts, CART cars had much more horsepower from their turbocharged engines, and less downforce and drag. They were thus expected to traverse the circuit much faster. TMS would have been the highest-banked track for a CART race since Atlanta Motor Speedway in 1983. The high banking and sharp turns were expected to impose unprecedented g loads on the drivers and cars. A test was scheduled for December 18, 2000 in order to address concerns.

TMS president Eddie Gossage wrote to CART management urging them to mandate certain suspension components, among others, to improve safety for the event. CART driver Maurício Gugelmin expressed that the drivers would face a challenge, but was confident that CART would find the solutions needed to conduct the race. Gugelmin also noted that "stronger parts will be necessary because of the loading generated by the banking."

== Testing ==
The first CART test session began on December 19, 2000. Kenny Bräck, a former IRL driver who had previously raced at Texas while with that series, was the first driver to take to the track. The target speeds were set at 225 mph. Bräck completed over 100 laps, with a top lap over 221 mph. CART chief steward J. Kirk Russell, track officials, Bräck, and Team Rahal expressed satisfaction with the test and the data collected. CART set its rules package for the race as utilizing 37 inHG manifold pressure (down from 40) and installing the Hanford device on all rear wings. However, Gossage told NBC Sports in 2016 that Bräck was not going full throttle during the test.

While CART did not arrange a full-field open test, several private tests followed. The second series of private tests, scheduled for three days, began February 21, 2001. The entire week was hindered by rain and cool temperatures. Patrick Racing and driver Jimmy Vasser were the first teams to take to the track. On the first day, rain kept the track closed until 11:30 a.m. A busy afternoon saw Vasser drive over 100 laps, with a top lap over 215 mph (346 km/h). Vasser reported it was "fairly easy to drive flat out" and said the track was somewhat bumpy. The team claimed to have accomplished all of their goals in the abbreviated half-day session, and canceled the remaining two days they had scheduled for the test.

Team KOOL Green tested at the track on February 22 with driver Dario Franchitti. He completed 190 laps with a top lap speed of 225.7 mph (363.2 km/h). Top trap speeds may have been as high as 228 mph (367 km/h).

Like Patrick Racing the day before, Team Green canceled their second scheduled day of testing when they felt they had accomplished their testing goals after only one session. Franchitti expressed reservations about the track's roughness and reported pulling 3 Gs in the corners. He also predicted that two-wide racing would be possible during the race.

PacWest Racing also tested at the track on February 22 with rookie driver Scott Dixon and Maurício Gugelmin. In 55 degree weather, Dixon drove about 140 laps, with a top speed close to 225 mph. Gugelmin also reported the ability to drive flat out around the track.

However, Gugelmin told Gossage and CART officials in a March 19 teleconference that he didn't believe CART could run a race at TMS. He claimed that the "wing configuration was wrong," and the cars were "too fast" for the track.

Also at the track on February 22 was Penske Racing with driver Hélio Castroneves and Walker Racing with driver Tora Takagi. Castroneves had a fast lap at about 226 mph.

All scheduled testing for February 23 was canceled due to rain. During the week, no incidents were reported. Tora Takagi, however, suffered gearbox trouble, and completed only 20 laps of testing.

=== Comparisons with IRL ===
The existing track qualifying record at Texas Motor Speedway for the Indy Racing League events was set June 5, 1998, by Tony Stewart (24.059 seconds; 224.448 mph). The fastest race lap, aided by a tow was set by Billy Boat the following day (23.759 seconds; 227.273 mph). The following year, the cars were slowed down by rule changes, and speed remained in the 215–216 mph range.

Scott Dixon's unaided 225 mph (362 km/h) lap during testing already unofficially broke the IRL's qualifying record.

=== Changes ===
Following the tests, very few changes were made to the cars leading up to the race. The teams that participated reported satisfaction with the information gathered during the tests. The primary concerns expressed dwelled on the roughness of the circuit.

The track itself, however, underwent a few upgrades. Changes included a concrete wall on pit lane between the pit stalls and the grassy "quad oval" area along the frontstretch. The track's surface was also smoothed in some areas, in response to the complaints.

== Race weekend ==
=== Friday morning practice ===
Going into race week, many drivers expressed apprehension about the upcoming race. The first practice session was held the morning of Friday April 27, 2001. CART officials re-measured the track for scoring purposes, and utilized a length of 1.482 miles. At the time, NASCAR and IRL utilized a track measurement of 1.5 miles (2.4 km). The first practice session saw no incidents. Tony Kanaan turned the fastest lap at 22.845 seconds (233.539 mph), a full second quicker than the fastest time reported during the test sessions.

April 27, 2001 – Morning Practice Top Speeds
Rank	Driver	Time	Speed
1	(Brazil) Tony Kanaan	22.845	233.539 mph (375.845 km/h)
2	(Brazil) Christian Fittipaldi	23.001	231.955 mph (373.295 km/h)
3	(Brazil) Hélio Castroneves	23.003	231.935 mph (373.263 km/h)
4	(Brazil) Cristiano da Matta	23.033	231.633 mph (372.777 km/h)
5	(Brazil) Gil de Ferran	23.035	231.613 mph (372.745 km/h)

=== Friday afternoon practice ===
The first crash of the weekend occurred during the Friday afternoon session, when Maurício Gugelmin crashed in turn 3. His car got loose exiting turn 2 and hit the inside wall at 66.2 g. His foot became lodged between the pedals, and the car accelerated. The car slid down the backstretch and hit the outside wall in turn 3 with a force of 113.1 g. The car continued to slide until it reached the apex between turn 3 and turn 4. Gugelmin claims to have blacked out during the crash, but he was not seriously injured. Gugelmin was wearing the HANS device. He withdrew, nursing bruised shoulders and ribs, and sat out the rest of the weekend.

Meanwhile, Kenny Bräck upped the fastest lap of the day to 22.821 seconds (233.785 mph). Dario Franchitti logged the fastest single trap speed at the start/finish line, at 238.936 mph.

During the day, some drivers remarked on the improvements made to the surface, that various bumps had been smoothed out. Most called the track very fast, and two-wide racing and drafting was observed. Bryan Herta likened the track to a bowl, calling it "fast and fun." Paul Tracy also called it "a fast track." Bruno Junqueira said it was the fastest track he had ever driven. An awestruck Nicolas Minassian compared it to riding a roller coaster. Hélio Castroneves called the track "physical," due to the banking, and Cristiano da Matta echoed the sentiment.

The first serious concerns about driver safety occurred on Friday afternoon. CART medical affairs director Steve Olvey would later report that two drivers felt dizzy and disoriented after running their cars at over 230 mph (370 km/h), and that they felt they could not control their cars. The identities of the two drivers were not disclosed, but Tony Kanaan and Alex Zanardi later claimed they experienced the symptoms. Olvey later recalled that Max Papis was unable to tell the frontstretch from the backstretch when his crew told him to pit. Adrian Fernandez also reported to the media he was experiencing dizziness. Olvey said in his 25 years of working in motorsports, it was a problem he had never experienced.

Later, chief steward Chris Kneifel recalled that he had also heard reports about drivers feeling dizzy, with some saying they had lost their equilibrium after getting out of their cars. CART competition and PR chief Mike Zizzo said that the cars were going so fast that one could get dizzy just watching them roar around the track.

April 27, 2001 – Afternoon Practice Top Speeds
Rank	Driver	Time	Speed
1	(Sweden) Kenny Bräck	22.821	233.785 mph (376.240 km/h)
2	(Brazil) Tony Kanaan	22.912	232.856 mph (374.745 km/h)
3	(Canada) Paul Tracy	22.936	232.612 mph (374.353 km/h)
4	(New Zealand) Scott Dixon	22.945	232.521 mph (374.206 km/h)
5	(United States) Bryan Herta	22.991	232.056 mph (373.458 km/h)

=== Saturday practice ===
On April 28, 2001, the morning practice session saw the fastest speeds thus far at the track. Paul Tracy ran a lap of 22.542 seconds (236.678 mph) to break the all-time track record from the previous afternoon.

Cristiano da Matta was involved in the second crash of the weekend. His car crashed in turn 3, and he was uninjured.

April 28, 2001 – Morning Practice Top Speeds
Rank	Driver	Time	Speed
1	(Canada) Paul Tracy	22.542	236.678 mph (380.896 km/h)
2	(Brazil) Tony Kanaan	22.556	236.531 mph (380.660 km/h)
3	(Italy) Max Papis	22.604	236.029 mph (379.852 km/h)
4	(United States) Bryan Herta	22.605	236.019 mph (379.836 km/h)
5	(Sweden) Kenny Bräck	22.624	235.820 mph (379.516 km/h)

=== Qualifying ===
Kenny Bräck qualified for the pole position at an all-time official track record of 22.854 seconds (233.447 mph). Patrick Carpentier was second, and Oriol Servia third. Twenty-four of the twenty-five cars were over 226 mph (364 km/h), and the average speed for the field was 229.9 mph (370.0 km/h).

During qualifying, drivers were reporting 5 lateral g sustained for 14-18 of the 23 seconds per lap.

April 28, 2001 – Qualifying Speeds
Rank	Driver	Time	Speed	Team
1	(Sweden) Kenny Bräck	22.854	233.447	Team Rahal
2	(Canada) Patrick Carpentier	22.864	233.345	Forsythe Racing
3	(Spain) Oriol Servia	22.900	232.978	Sigma Autosport
4	(United States) Bryan Herta	22.931	232.663	Zakspeed/Forsythe Racing
5	(Japan) Shinji Nakano	22.988	232.086	Fernández Racing
6	(Italy) Alex Zanardi	23.003	231.935	Mo Nunn Racing
7	(Brazil) Gil de Ferran	23.067	231.291	Team Penske
8	(Canada) Alex Tagliani	23.077	231.191	Forsythe Racing
9	(Brazil) Christian Fittipaldi	23.079	231.171	Newman/Haas Racing
10	(Canada) Paul Tracy	23.097	230.991	Team Green
11	(Brazil) Cristiano da Matta	23.105	230.911	Newman/Haas Racing
12	(Mexico) Adrian Fernandez	23.116	230.801	Fernández Racing
13	(Mexico) Michel Jourdain Jr.	23.120	230.761	Bettenhausen Racing
14	(Brazil) Tony Kanaan	23.142	230.542	Mo Nunn Racing
15	(France) Nicolas Minassian	23.146	230.502	Chip Ganassi Racing
16	(United Kingdom) Dario Franchitti	23.165	230.313	Team Green
17	(Italy) Max Papis	23.176	230.204	Team Rahal
18	(United States) Michael Andretti	23.215	229.817	Team Motorola
19	(Brazil) Hélio Castroneves	23.292	229.057	Team Penske
20	(New Zealand) Scott Dixon	23.319	228.792	PacWest Racing
21	(Brazil) Bruno Junqueira	23.373	228.263	Chip Ganassi Racing
22	(United States) Jimmy Vasser	23.479	227.233	Patrick Racing
23	(Japan) Tora Takagi	23.533	226.711	Walker Racing
24	(Brazil) Roberto Moreno	23.580	226.260	Patrick Racing
25	(Brazil) Max Wilson	24.308	219.483	Arciero-Blair Racing

=== Post-qualifying ===
After the CART series finished qualifying, the Dayton Indy Lights series held a 100-mile (160 km) race at the track. Dan Wheldon and Mario Domínguez had led the speed charts in practice and qualifying, with top laps over 188 mph (303 km/h). Damien Faulkner won the race at an average speed of 150.491 mph.

By late Saturday afternoon, concerns were rising about driver safety on the track. Patrick Carpentier went to the medical facility to have his wrist checked (a previous injury he had suffered in a crash at Long Beach). As an aside, he mentioned that he could not walk in a straight line for at least four minutes after he got out of his car. An impromptu survey was taken during the private drivers' meeting and 21 of the 25 drivers in the starting field reported suffering disorientation and vertigo-like symptoms, including inner ear, or vision problems, after running more than 10 laps (or 20 laps). They also claimed that they had had virtually no peripheral vision and limited reaction time. This was due to sustained g-loads as high as 5.5, almost double what most persons can endure, and closer to what jet pilots usually experience in shorter time intervals.

Veteran racing reporter John Oreovicz later said that the Saturday practice session was one of the few times he could recall fearing for the safety of the drivers and fans in what at the time was a quarter-century of covering races. By then, at least one driver, Franchitti, doubted that the race would go on as scheduled. Later, Bräck recalled that when the drivers' meeting concluded, only he and Tracy were in favor of racing the following day.

== Postponement ==
Olvey contacted Dr. Richard Jennings, a former flight director at NASA and professor of aviation medicine at the University of Texas. They discussed the known levels of human tolerance of vertical g-loads. Jennings replied that the human body could not tolerate sustained loads of more than 4-4.5 g. CART determined that the race could not be run at more than 225 mph (362 km/h) without raising safety concerns over g-LOC.

The night before the race, CART officials attempted to make last-ditch efforts to curtail speeds by having the teams take downforce out of the car, and reduce horsepower. According to Zizzo, they felt that they could not slow the cars down by more than three or four mph without risking engine failure. One proposal, seriously considered, would have called for a makeshift chicane of cones along the backstretch. Another proposal considered was to wave yellow flags every 20 laps to regulate the drivers' bloodstream.

However, by Sunday morning, time was running out to make changes necessary to hold the race safely. The morning warm-up session was canceled. Two hours before the scheduled start, the race was postponed. Over 60,000 fans were sent home. The move came after Kniefel and CART president Joe Heitzler had a series of meetings with drivers, owners and sponsors. All parties agreed that it didn't make sense to hold the race under the circumstances.

At a press conference, Heitzler did not blame the track. Rather, he stressed that officials could not in good conscience allow a race with such serious concerns about the safety of the drivers. Olvey added that the drivers were experiencing g forces well beyond the limits of "human tolerance"–a problem that would have likely been exacerbated since the temperature was an unseasonably warm 80 °F (27 °C). There was fear of the possibility that drivers could suffer "grey-outs" or lose consciousness from g-LOC. It is also likely that the high g-loads would have been outside the design limits for the HANS device, which was required for all CART races at oval tracks.

Gossage was harshly critical of CART's decision. He argued that CART assured him it could run the race even though it had not conducted more extensive tests at the track. Russell argued that there was no time due to scheduling conflicts. Michael Andretti added that there was no real way to simulate ≈26 or more cars in a race. ESPN's Robin Miller later said that CART should have known there was a problem the minute the first driver clocked 230 mph (370 km/h) on Friday.

CART officials held out the possibility of rescheduling the race, but there was no room in the schedule and it was ultimately canceled. The race marked the first and only time a CART race would be canceled outright due to driver safety issues.

== Lawsuit and settlement ==
Speedway Motorsports, the owner of Texas Motor Speedway, sued CART on May 8 for breach of contract. Damages cited included issuing refunds for over 60,000 tickets, purse, the $2.1 million sanction fee, and additional compensation for promotional expenses, lost profits, and other damages.

During the suit, it subsequently emerged that CART had ignored repeated requests to conduct testing at TMS before the aborted race. On October 16, the two parties settled for an undisclosed amount. Terms were not disclosed, but estimates were between $5–$7 million. A contract that included a race for 2002 and 2003 was annulled.

In the aftermath, the handling of the incident was widely criticized by fans and media. While the sanctioning body was commended by many for choosing not to put its drivers in danger the race was largely viewed as a debacle, a low point for the series, and very damaging to the organization in the months and years to come. CART reported that it spent $3.5 million for the settlement and legal costs, resulting in a $1.7 million loss for the third quarter of 2001. CART declared bankruptcy and was sold in 2003, became known as Champ Car, and never attempted to return to Texas Motor Speedway. Ultimately it was absorbed into the Indy Racing League in 2008.

== See also ==
- 2011 IZOD IndyCar World Championship

Previous race: 2001 Toyota Long Beach Grand Prix	CART FedEx Championship Series; 2001 season	Next race: 2001 Lehigh Valley Grand Prix
Previous race: Not Held -	Firestone Firehawk 600	Next race: Not Held -
