= Load factor (aeronautics) =

Ratio of the lift of an aircraft to its weight

In aeronautics, the load factor is the ratio of the lift of an aircraft to its weight and represents a global measure of the stress ("load") to which the structure of the aircraft is subjected:

$$n = \frac{L}{W},$$

where

$n$ is the load factor,
$L$ is the lift
$W$ is the weight.

Since the load factor is the ratio of two forces, it is dimensionless. However, its units are traditionally referred to as g, because of the relation between load factor and apparent acceleration of gravity felt on board the aircraft. A load factor of one, or 1 g, represents conditions in straight and level flight, where the lift is equal to the weight. Load factors greater or less than one (or even negative) are the result of maneuvers or wind gusts.

== Load factor and g ==
The fact that the load factor is commonly expressed in g units does not mean that it is dimensionally the same as the acceleration of gravity, also indicated with g. The load factor is strictly non-dimensional.

The use of g units refers to the fact that an observer on board an aircraft will experience an apparent acceleration of gravity (i.e. relative to their frame of reference) equal to load factor times the acceleration of gravity. For example, an observer on board an aircraft performing a turn with a load factor of 2 (i.e. a 2 g turn) will see objects falling to the floor at twice the normal acceleration of gravity.

In general, whenever the term load factor is used, it is formally correct to express it using numbers only, as in "a maximum load factor of 4". If the term load factor is omitted then g is used instead, as in "pulling a 3 g turn".

A load factor greater than 1 will cause the stall speed to increase by the square root of the load factor. For example, if the load factor is 2, the stall speed will increase by $\sqrt{2}$, or 1.41 times, the stall speed in straight and level flight.

== Positive and negative load factors ==
Variation of the load factor n with the bank angle θ, during a coordinated turn. Pink force is the apparent weight on board.

The load factor, and in particular its sign, depends not only on the forces acting on the aircraft, but also on the orientation of its vertical axis.

During straight and level flight, the load factor is +1 if the aircraft is flown "the right way up", whereas it becomes −1 if the aircraft is flown "upside-down" (inverted). In both cases the lift vector is the same (as seen by an observer on the ground), but in the latter the vertical axis of the aircraft points downwards, making the lift vector's sign negative.

In turning flight the load factor is normally greater than +1. For example, in a turn with a 60° angle of bank the load factor is +2. Again, if the same turn is performed with the aircraft inverted, the load factor becomes −2. In general, in a balanced turn in which the angle of bank is θ, the load factor n is related to the cosine of θ as

$$n = \frac{1}{\cos\theta}.$$

Another way to achieve load factors significantly higher than +1 is to pull on the elevator control at the bottom of a dive, whereas strongly pushing the stick forward during straight and level flight is likely to produce negative load factors, by causing the lift to act in the opposite direction to normal, i.e. downwards.

== Load factor and lift ==
In the definition of load factor, the lift is not simply that one generated by the aircraft's wing, instead it is the vector sum of the lift generated by the wing, the fuselage and the tailplane, or in other words it is the component perpendicular to the airflow of the sum of all aerodynamic forces acting on the aircraft.

The lift in the load factor is also intended as having a sign, which is positive if the lift vector points in, or near the same direction as the aircraft's vertical axis, or negative if it points in, or near the opposite direction.

== Design standards ==
Excessive load factors must be avoided because of the possibility of exceeding the structural strength of the aircraft.

Civil aviation authorities specify the load factor limits within which different categories of aircraft are required to operate without damage. For example, the US Federal Aviation Regulations prescribe the following limits (for the most restrictive case):

- For transport category airplanes, from −1 to +2.5 (or up to +3.8 depending on design takeoff weight)
- For normal category and commuter category airplanes, from −1.52 to +3.8
- For utility category airplanes, from −1.76 to +4.4
- For acrobatic category airplanes, from −3.0 to +6.0
- For helicopters, from −1 to +3.5

However, many aircraft types, in particular aerobatic airplanes, are designed so that they can tolerate load factors much higher than the minimum required. For example, the Sukhoi Su-26 family has load factor limits of −10 to +12.

The maximum load factors, both positive and negative, applicable to an aircraft are usually specified in the aircraft flight manual.

== Human perception of load factor ==
When the load factor is +1, all occupants of the aircraft feel that their weight is normal. When the load factor is greater than +1 all occupants feel heavier than usual. For example, in a 2 g maneuver all occupants feel that their weight is twice normal. When the load factor is zero, or very small, all occupants feel weightless. When the load factor is negative, all occupants feel that they are upside down.

Humans have limited ability to withstand a load factor significantly greater than 1, both positive and negative. Unmanned aerial vehicles can be designed for much greater load factors, both positive and negative, than conventional aircraft, allowing these vehicles to be used in maneuvers that would be incapacitating for a human pilot.

== See also ==
- g-force
- G-LOC Loss of consciousness due to excessive G (also known as blackout)
- Greyout Incapacitation due to excessive positive G
- Redout Incapacitation due to excessive negative G
- Apparent weight
