= G-suit =

Flight suit which controls blood-flow during high acceleration

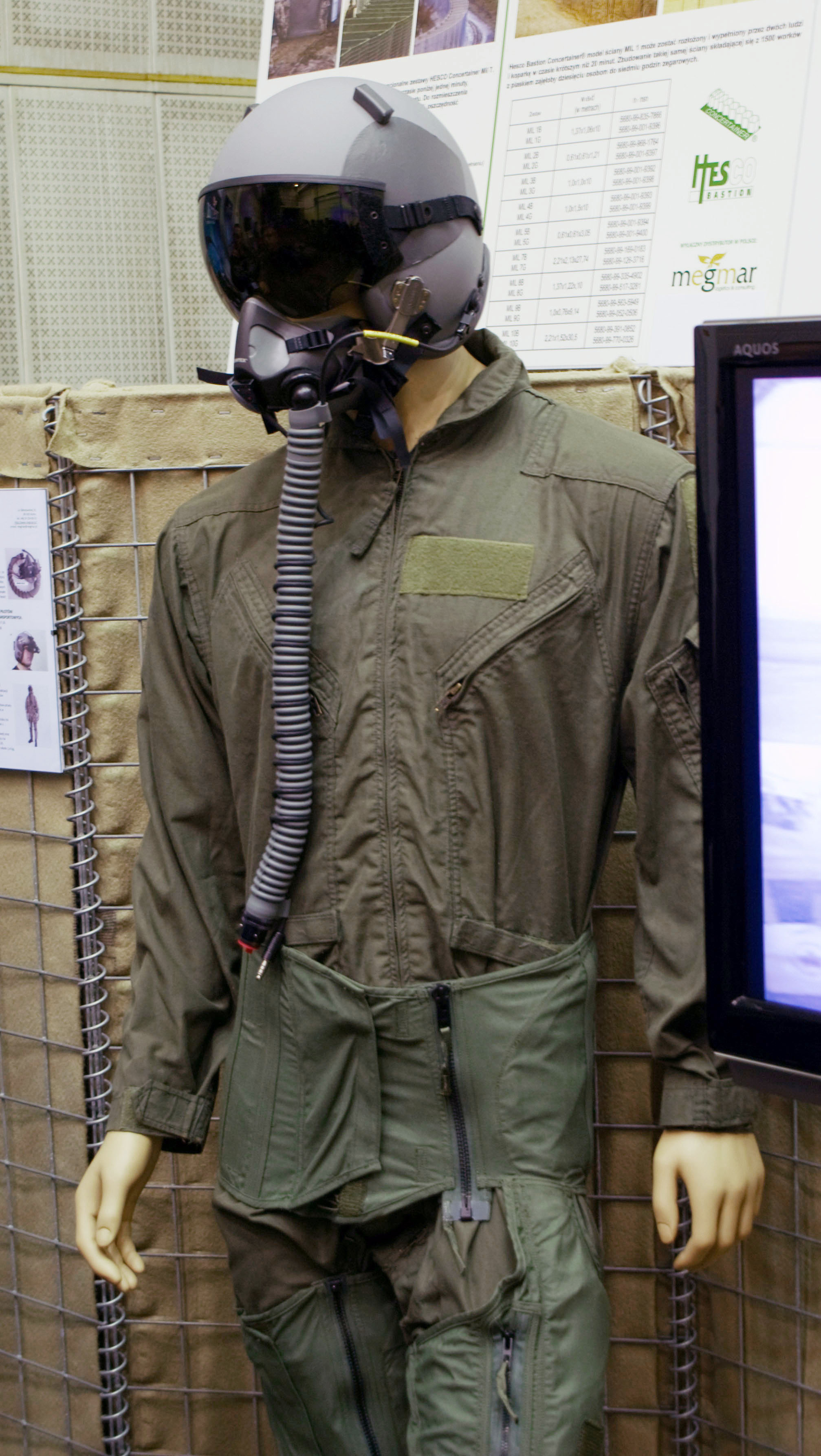
MSF830 anti-g suit trousers and cummerbund fitted over a flying suit

A g-suit, or anti-g suit, is a flight suit worn by aviators and astronauts who are subject to high levels of acceleration force (g). It is designed to prevent a black-out and g-LOC (g-induced loss of consciousness) caused by the blood pooling in the lower part of the body when under acceleration, thus depriving the brain of blood. Black-out and g-LOC have caused a number of fatal aircraft accidents.

== Operation ==
If blood is allowed to pool in the lower areas of the body, the brain will be deprived of blood. This lack of blood flow to the brain first causes a greyout (a dimming of the vision also called brownout), followed by tunnel vision and ultimately complete loss of vision ('blackout') followed by g-induced loss of consciousness or 'g-LOC'. The danger of g-LOC to aircraft pilots is magnified because on relaxation of g-force there is a period of disorientation before full sensation is regained. A g-suit does not so much increase the g-threshold, but makes it possible to sustain high g longer without excessive physical fatigue. The resting g-tolerance of a typical person is anywhere from 3–5 g depending on the person. A g-suit will typically add 1 g of tolerance to that limit. Pilots still need to practice the 'g-straining maneuver' that consists of tensing the abdominal muscles in order to tighten blood vessels so as to reduce blood pooling in the lower body. High g is not comfortable, even with a g-suit. In older fighter aircraft, 6 g was considered a high level, but with modern fighters 9 g or more can be sustained structurally making the pilot the critical factor in maintaining high maneuverability in close aerial combat.

== Design ==
A g-suit is a special garment and generally takes the form of tightly fitting trousers, which fit either under or over (depending on the design) the flight suit worn by the aviator or astronaut. The trousers are fitted with inflatable bladders which, when pressurized through a g-sensitive valve in the aircraft or spacecraft, press firmly on the abdomen and legs, thus restricting the draining of blood away from the brain during periods of high acceleration. In addition, in some modern very high-g aircraft, the anti-g suit effect is augmented by a small amount of pressure applied to the lungs (positive pressure breathing), which also enhances resistance to high g. The effects of anti-g suits and positive pressure breathing are straightforward to replicate in a simulator, although only continuous g can be produced artificially in devices such as centrifuges.

Various designs of g-suit have been developed. They first used water-filled bladders around the lower body and legs. Later designs used air under pressure to inflate the bladders. These g-suits were lighter than the liquid-filled versions and are still in extensive use. However, the Swiss company Life Support Systems AG and the German Autoflug collaborated to design the new Libelle suit for use with the Eurofighter Typhoon aircraft, which reverts to liquid as the medium and improves on performance. The Libelle suit is under consideration for adoption by the United States Air Force.

== History ==
As early as 1917, there were documented cases of pilots' loss of consciousness due to g (G-LOC) that were referred to as "fainting in the air".

The recognition that the tight turns required of RAF High Speed Flight pilots taking part in 1920s Schneider Trophy races causing blackouts meant a restriction to 4 g to limit them to "grey out" with only partial loss of vision.

In 1931 a professor of physiology, Frank Cotton, from the University of Sydney described a new way of determining the center of gravity of the human body. This made it possible to describe the displacement of mass within the body under acceleration. Cotton had recognised the need for an anti-gravity suit during the 1940 Battle of Britain. It was estimated that 30% of pilot deaths were due to accidents, including black-out. Supermarine Spitfires, in particular, were capable of rapid turns that generated high g-forces, causing black-out when diving to fire or avoid enemy fire.

With the development of higher speed monoplane fighters in the late 1930s, acceleration forces during combat became more severe. As early as 1940 some aircraft had foot-rests above the rudder pedals so that the pilot's feet and legs could be raised during combat in an attempt to minimize the negative effects of high speed turns. Large rudder deflections were often not necessary during such manoeuvres, but being able to cut inside the opponent's turning radius was.

=== Franks g-suit ===
Wilbur R. Franks had suggested water-filled system in 1938 and in the absence of government funding he built a prototype – sized on himself – with private funding, but his work was limited by availability of a suitable aircraft. In 1940 the UK provided a Supermarine Spitfire to aid his research. The first g-suits were developed by a team led by Franks at the University of Toronto's Banting and Best Medical Institute in 1941. The suits were manufactured by the Dunlop company and first used operationally in 1942 by pilots of 807 Squadron Fleet Air Arm (FAA) flying Supermarine Seafires during the Operation Torch invasion of North Africa. These devices used water-filled bladders around the legs; two Marks (versions) were developed:

- Franks Mark I suits were used by RAF Hawker Hurricane and Supermarine Spitfire pilots;
- Franks Mark II suits were used by the United States Army Air Forces and Royal Canadian Air Force pilots.

Adoption of the suit by the RAF was limited, as there was concern about pilots exceeding the stress limits of their aircraft and the possibility of revealing its existence to the enemy.

=== Cotton Aerodynamic Anti-G Flying Suit ===
Professor Frank Cotton of Sydney University, Australia, designed the first successful gas-operated anti-g suit. Research commenced late in 1940, and a suit was designed with rubber sacs covered externally by inextensible material. The sacs automatically inflated when g forces increased during flying. The suit was developed at the Sydney Medical School. Cotton constructed the first human centrifuge in the Anderson Stuart Building at Sydney University under tight wartime security. The volunteers, young airmen, were strapped by their legs to the centrifuge and subjected to high g-force and monitored until black-out occurred. All lost consciousness. On February 19, 1942, the day of the major Japanese bombing of Darwin, Cotton's suit was approved by the Allied war chiefs. The Americans soon issued orders for manufacture of a suit based on Cotton's design. The Cotton suit was later flight-tested in a Hurricane, Kittyhawks, and Spitfires and provided about 2 g protection. It was examined by RAF Physiological Laboratory and the Royal Air Force ran competitive trials of the Cotton anti-g suit with the Frank g-suit that was already adopted in 1944. The Franks suit was self-contained, production contracts prepared and there was insufficient capacity to develop both simultaneously so the RAF was not able to take it on but recommended the RAAF did. The Royal Air Force concluded that: "There is no doubt the Cotton Suit gives the best protection." The Cotton suit's use of gas-inflatable bladders is still used in the modern anti-g suit.

=== 'Berger' gradient pressure suit ===
In the United States, physiologists Earl H. Wood, Edward Baldes, Charles Code and Edward H. Lambert, working in a top-secret research lab at the Mayo Clinic, helped to define the specific physiologic effects causing blackout and unconsciousness during high g forces. Based upon their new understanding of the physiologic effects of high g-forces, they developed a more practical g-suit derived from the work of Cotton and Franks. This suit used inflation like the Cotton suit. While Cotton's design was intriguing, he was more focused on the center of gravity than on blood flow. This latter point was the key to making a practical anti-g suit that could be worn in combat. This suit was worn by US pilots towards the end of World War II.

The researchers were part of a team assembled at the Mayo Clinic investigating the effects of high-performance flight on military pilots, by studying the physiological effects of flight and how to mitigate them. They used a large centrifuge to whirl riders and observe their blood pressures at the head and heart levels with special instruments. To prevent drops in blood pressure, the team designed an air bladder suit that inflated the pilot's calves, thighs, and abdomen. A primary contribution, allowing for the shift from pulsatile water-filled bladders to non-pulsatile air-filled bladders, made by the Mayo investigators was to show that maintenance of arterial pressure rather than venous return was required to maintain perfusion of the eyes and brain. Prototypes of the GPS suits were known as the "arterial occlusion suit" or the Clark-Wood suit, named after Wood and Dave Clark (head of the David Clark Company who fabricated the early suits for the team at Mayo).

Their efforts finally culminated with the release of the first US military design in late 1943: the GPS (gradient pressure suit) type fighter pilot's G-1 anti-g suit. The team subsequently worked on developing further, more advanced models in 1944 and beyond.

Although uncomfortable and distracting to use, later research showed that military fighter pilots who wore g-suits survived and defeated their opponents in greater numbers than those who didn't.

Modern g-suits meet the United States Air Force Standard CSU-13B/P and United States Navy Standard CSU 15 A/P.

== Uses ==
=== Prone pilot position aircraft ===
During World War II the German Henschel Hs 132 (never flew) and the US Northrop XP-79 (crashed on first powered flight) jets both had prone positions to minimize blood pooling in the legs. After 1945 the British experimented with prone flying positions in a highly modified Gloster Meteor F8 jet fighter and the Reid and Sigrist R.S.3 "Bobsleigh" a piston engined trainer. However, other difficulties associated with prone piloting and the development of practical g-suits for normal seating positions terminated these experiments.

A similar concept, the supine cockpit, exists.

=== Military aviation and space ===
Air-based g-suits were very common in NATO aircraft of all nations from the 1950s onwards and are still in common use today.

Later jets such as the McDonnell Douglas F-15 Eagle, General Dynamics F-16 Fighting Falcon, Boeing F/A-18 Super Hornet, Eurofighter Typhoon and the Dassault Rafale can sustain high g loads for longer periods, and are therefore more physically demanding. By using a modern g-suit in combination with anti-g strain techniques, a trained pilot is now expected to endure accelerations of up to 9 g without blacking out.

Astronauts wear g-suits similar to aviators but face different challenges due to the effects of microgravity. Aviator g-suits apply uniform pressure to the lower legs to minimize the effects of high acceleration but research from the Canadian Space Agency implies there might be a benefit in having a suit for astronauts that uses a "milking action" to increase blood flow to the upper body.

=== Red Bull Air Race ===
Pilots in Red Bull Air Race World Championship have worn a g-suit called g-race suit since the 2009 season. The g-race suit is a water-filled, autonomous and aircraft-independent working full-body g-protection system. It is tailor-made for each pilot and can be fine adjusted via lacings.

The g-race suit contains four so-called "fluid muscles" which are sealed, liquid-filled tubes. Each fluid muscle extends from the shoulder to the ankle. Two fluid muscles – each filled with approximately 1 litre of fluid for a total of around 4 litres (1.1 US gal) per g-race suit – are routed vertically on the front side of the g-race suit and two are routed vertically on the rear side of the g-race suit. The suit weighs on average 6.5 kilograms (14 lb) in total, and its fabric is made out of a special mix of Twaron and Nomex. The counter-pressure effect occurs instantaneously without any time delay compared to an up to two second delay before reaching full system protection in standard pneumatic, inflatable g-suits. The race pilot utilizes the g-race suit interactively by muscle straining and breathing techniques to achieve an improved cardiac output and thus improved g-protection.

== See also ==
- Index of aviation articles
- High-g training
- Aviation medicine
- Acceleration
- Air combat
