= Brownout =

Brownout may refer to:

- Brownout (electricity), drop in voltage in an electrical power supply
- Brownout (software engineering), a technique to make applications more tolerant to capacity shortages
- Brownout (aeronautics), reduced flight visibility due to airborne particles, especially from helicopter downwash
- Brownout (band), a band from Austin, Texas

== See also ==
- Greyout, a transient loss of vision caused by hypoxia
- Redout, a medical symptom caused by negative g-force
- Blackout (disambiguation)
- Whiteout (disambiguation)
- Eddie Leonski (1917–1942), American soldier and serial killer, responsible for the strangling murders of three women in Melbourne, Australia, also known as "The Brownout Strangler"
