= G-loading =

G-loading may refer to:

- applying g-force to an object
  - Load factor (aeronautics)#Load factor and g
- g factor (psychometrics)
