= Grey out =

Grey out or gray out may refer to:

- A greyout is a dimming or fading of vision
- A grayed out appearance of a control in a software user interface, indicating that the command is currently unavailable.

== See also ==
- Brownout (disambiguation)
