= Redout =

Medical symptom due to negative g-force

A redout occurs when the body experiences a negative g-force sufficient to cause a blood flow from the lower parts of the body to the head. It is the inverse effect of a greyout, where blood flows away from the head to the lower parts of the body. Usually, a redout will only ever be experienced by aircraft pilots, as planes are the most common devices that allow such negative g-forces to be exerted. Redouts are potentially dangerous and can cause retinal damage and hemorrhagic stroke.

According to the predominant theory, the redness appearing in the visual field is not caused by an actual blood flow to the eye, but it is most likely caused by the blood-laden lower eyelid coming into the visual field because of the pull of negative-Gs.

== See also ==
- Greyout – Visual dimming caused by hypoxia
- Fainting – Transient loss of consciousness and postural tone
- Presyncope – Stage before syncope (fainting)
- Blackout (disambiguation)
- Brownout (disambiguation)
- Whiteout (disambiguation)
