= GLOC =

GLOC may refer to:

- ground lines of communication, in military strategy
- g-LOC (g-force induced loss of consciousness), in aerospace physiology

== See also ==
- Glocs. or Glocs, an obsolete or informal abbreviation for Gloucestershire, a county in England
