= 2001 Lehigh Valley Grand Prix =

Motor race held in Nazareth, Pennsylvania

Coordinates: 40.728°N 75.319°W

(United States) 2001 Lehigh Valley Grand Prix
Race details
Race 4 of 21 in the 2001 CART season
← Previous race	Next race →
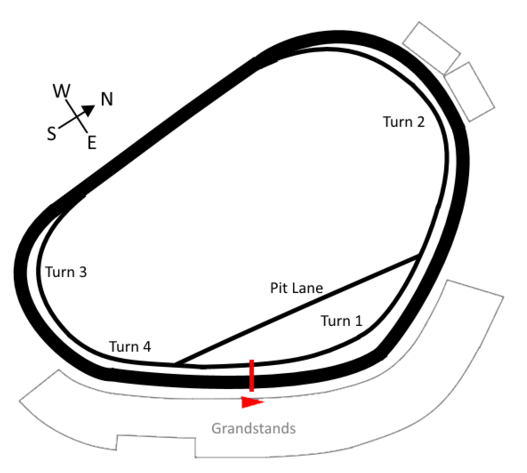
- Layout of Nazareth Speedway
- Date: May 6, 2001
- Official name: Lehigh Valley Grand Prix Presented by Toyota
- Location: Nazareth Speedway; Nazareth, Pennsylvania, United States
- Course: Permanent racing facility 0.946 mi / 1.522 km
- Distance: 225 laps 212.850 mi / 342.450 km
- Weather: Sunny

Pole position
- Driver: (Brazil) Bruno Junqueira (Chip Ganassi Racing)
- Time: 19.700

Fastest lap
- Driver: (Brazil) Tony Kanaan (Mo Nunn Racing)
- Time: 21.170 (on lap 196 of 225)

Podium
- First: (New Zealand) Scott Dixon (PacWest Racing)
- Second: (Sweden) Kenny Bräck (Team Rahal)
- Third: (Canada) Paul Tracy (Team Green)

The 2001 Lehigh Valley Grand Prix Presented by Toyota was a Championship Auto Racing Teams (CART) open-wheel race that was held on May 6, 2001, at Nazareth Speedway in Nazareth, Pennsylvania before 25,000 spectators. It was the fourth round of the 2001 CART FedEx Championship Series and the 15th running of the event. Scott Dixon of PacWest Racing won the 225-lap race; Team Rahal's Kenny Bräck finished second, while Paul Tracy took third for Team Green.

Bruno Junqueira recorded the fastest time of qualifying and earned his first career pole position. He was quickly overtaken by Bräck, who went on to lead the first 125 laps while Dixon and others made pit stops on the 116th lap with the intention of saving fuel to make it to the end. After Bräck pitted, Tony Kanaan assumed the lead for the next 64 laps. He made his last stop on lap 190, allowing Dixon to take the lead. Because Bräck struggled to garner speed at the exit of the corners, Dixon was able to pull away and score his first (and only) CART win in his third start. He became the youngest winner in CART history at 20 years, nine months, and 14 days old. (Note: The record was previously held by Greg Moore, who was 22 years, one month, and 10 days old when he won the 1997 Miller 200 at the Milwaukee Mile. It was later broken by Nelson Philippe, who was 20 years, two months, and 29 days old when he won the 2006 Lexmark Indy 300 at the Surfers Paradise Street Circuit.) The lead was swapped twice between three different drivers, and six caution flags were issued.

With 17 races remaining in the 2001 season, Tracy tied with Cristiano da Matta for the Drivers' Championship lead, and Jimmy Vasser tied with defending series champion Gil de Ferran for third in the standings. Reynard maintained their lead in the Constructors' Cup, while Toyota overtook Honda for the lead in the Manufacturers' Cup standings. This was the last CART race at Nazareth Speedway; from 2002 to 2004, the event was sanctioned by the Indy Racing League.

== Background ==
The Lehigh Valley Grand Prix was a motor race that had been held on an annual basis since 1987 under the sanctioning of Championship Auto Racing Teams (CART). The 15th edition of the event was included as the fourth of 21 open-wheel races for CART's 2001 FedEx Championship Series schedule. It was held at Nazareth Speedway, a four-turn, 0.946 mi (1.522 km) tri-oval track, in Nazareth, Pennsylvania, United States, over a distance of 225 laps and 212.85 mi (342.55 km). The USAC Silver Bullet Series and the Atlantic Championship hosted support races during the weekend. Gil de Ferran was the defending race winner. Firestone provided seven sets of tires per car for the weekend.

Heading into the race, Cristiano da Matta led the Drivers' Championship with 37 points, seven more than second-place de Ferran and ten ahead of third-place Hélio Castroneves. Paul Tracy stood fourth on 26 points, and Jimmy Vasser was fifth on 18. In the Constructors' Cup, Reynard held the lead with 39 points, while Lola trailed them by one. Honda was leading the Manufacturers' Cup standings with 38 points; Toyota placed second with 37 points, and Ford-Cosworth was third on 15.

The race weekend was overshadowed by the controversy of the previous round, the Firestone Firehawk 600 at Texas Motor Speedway, which had been postponed because the g-forces that drivers were experiencing on the circuit were deemed too excessive and unsafe. Although officials of the track and CART discussed options over possible dates later in the year, Texas Motor Speedway issued a statement on May 2 confirming that the race had been officially cancelled.

It had also been determined that this was to be the last CART race at Nazareth Speedway, which track president and general manager Craig Rust confirmed in November 2000. The track's contract with the series expired in May 2001, and CART's board of directors chose not to renew it. With Nazareth removed from the schedule, the series was left without a presence in the Northeastern United States after having previously hosted races in the Meadowlands, Pocono, and New Hampshire. Team owner Roger Penske, who owned Nazareth Speedway from 1987 to 1999, felt that the track acted as "(CART's) east coast anchor" and encouraged CART to settle on a consistent race date, namely in May prior to the Indianapolis 500. On the day of the race, CART president Joseph Heitzler issued a statement that the series would be reviewing its options after the race in Japan and make a decision then:

...[O]ne of the things that has become clear to me in my five months at CART is that we must develop a process that allows us to more effectively determine where we conduct races. We have established more definitive criteria than were used in the past and are now approaching where we race in a more formal manner. This approach applies directly to the situation we face in the Lehigh Valley.

Because of driver complaints that the aerodynamic package used in oval races the year before had caused too much turbulence and reduced the amount of on-track passing, CART introduced a low-downforce version of the Hanford device on the cars instead of the high-downforce version that was used previously. This configuration debuted at Nazareth and was intended to slow the cars down in the corners enough to encourage passing. Another rule that was implemented in this race was the requirement for all teams to use a single-point refueling system to fuel their cars.

Of the 26 full-time drivers in the series, the only driver who did not compete in the race was Maurício Gugelmin, who withdrew from the race following the death of his six-year-old son, Giuliano, who succumbed to respiratory complications on May 3. Gugelmin had not missed a CART race since his debut at Mid-Ohio in 1993; his streak of 130 consecutive races had been the longest of all active drivers in the series. PacWest Racing decided not to replace him for the weekend and withdrew his No. 17 car. The Nextel sponsorship on Gugelmin's car was resultantly placed onto that of his teammate, Scott Dixon.

== Practice ==
Three practice sessions preceded the race on Sunday, two on Friday and one on Saturday. The first session lasted 120 minutes, and the second and third sessions lasted 105 minutes. Bruno Junqueira topped the time sheets during the first practice session on Friday morning with a 20.485-second lap. He and Chip Ganassi Racing teammate Nicolas Minassian previously tested at the track in November 2000 and in April 2001, the latter of which was for a rookie test that Dixon and Tora Takagi also participated in. Hélio Castroneves was second-quickest, just under two tenths of a second slower than Junqueira, while Kenny Bräck was third, Max Papis was fourth, and Michel Jourdain Jr. was fifth.

Although the high temperatures on Friday afternoon were expected to decrease speeds, many drivers set their fastest times of the day during the second practice session, which was led by Papis with a time of 20.653 seconds. Bräck, Castroneves, Gil de Ferran, and Paul Tracy were second-through-fifth fastest in the session. Junqueira remained the fastest overall driver on Friday with his morning session time.

For the third practice session on Saturday morning, the 25 drivers were split into two groups based on their position in the Drivers' Championship standings and were each allotted 45 minutes of on-track time. A 15-minute break separated the two groups. The session, which ended prematurely because of rain showers, was led by Bräck with a 19.926-second lap; he and Castroneves, who was five hundredths of a second slower, were the only two drivers to post times below 20 seconds. Junqueira, Oriol Servià, and Papis were third-, fourth-, and fifth-fastest, respectively. Papis caused the only stoppage of the session when he spun while exiting turn four.

== Qualifying ==
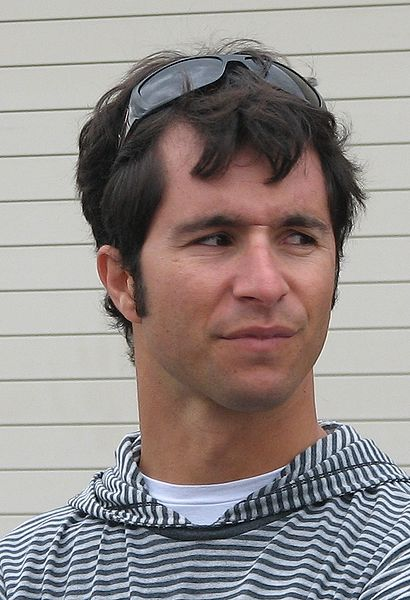
Bruno Junqueira (pictured in 2009) earned his first career pole position.

During the qualifying session, held on Saturday afternoon, each driver was allowed up to four warm-up laps before completing two timed laps, the fastest of which would determine their starting position. The start of the session was delayed by eight minutes so that track marshals could dry the track's surface after the rainfall subsided. Junqueira earned his first pole position in his third start in CART with a time of 19.700 seconds, becoming the first rookie to win a pole in the series since Alex Tagliani in the 2000 Rio 200. It also marked Chip Ganassi Racing's third consecutive pole at Nazareth Speedway. Bräck continued his streak of four front-row qualifying efforts with a lap that was 0.038 seconds slower than Junqueira. Michel Jourdain Jr. took third place, the best qualifying result of his career thus far, while Servià qualified fourth to complete a top-four sweep for Lola chassis. The top ten positions were rounded out by Castroneves, Adrián Fernández, Bryan Herta, Tracy, Cristiano da Matta, and Tony Kanaan.

Jimmy Vasser struggled with understeer and qualified 11th, ahead of Dario Franchitti in 12th and Michael Andretti in 13th. Papis accelerated too early and looped his car one and a half times in turn four, but managed to avoid hitting anything. He was limited to one timed lap in his second qualifying attempt and took the 14th position. De Ferran started 15th with an understeering car; Roberto Moreno, Christian Fittipaldi, Tora Takagi, Shinji Nakano, and Tagliani rounded out the top-20. Alex Zanardi resorted to a backup car because of mechanical issues in the morning practice session and started 21st, with Patrick Carpentier in 22nd, Scott Dixon in 23rd, and Max Wilson in 24th. Nicolas Minassian was the only driver who did not complete his qualifying attempt. In the second turn, Minassian slammed the outside wall with such force that an oil line ruptured, causing his car to burst into flames. Minassian was uninjured, but was forced to switch to a backup car for the race and occupy the 25th and final position on the starting grid.

=== Qualifying classification ===
Final qualifying results
Pos.	No.	Driver	Team	Time	Speed	Grid
1	4	(Brazil) Bruno Junqueira	Chip Ganassi Racing	19.700	172.873	1
2	8	(Sweden) Kenny Bräck	Team Rahal	19.738	172.540	2
3	16	(Mexico) Michel Jourdain Jr.	Bettenhausen Racing	19.950	170.707	3
4	22	(Spain) Oriol Servià	Sigma Autosport	19.996	170.314	4
5	3	(Brazil) Hélio Castroneves	Team Penske	20.007	170.220	5
6	51	(Mexico) Adrián Fernández	Fernández Racing	20.059	169.779	6
7	77	(United States) Bryan Herta	Forsythe Racing	20.064	169.737	7
8	26	(Canada) Paul Tracy	Team Green	20.148	169.029	8
9	6	(Brazil) Cristiano da Matta	Newman/Haas Racing	20.162	168.912	9
10	55	(Brazil) Tony Kanaan	Mo Nunn Racing	20.187	168.703	10
11	40	(United States) Jimmy Vasser	Patrick Racing	20.191	168.669	11
12	27	(United Kingdom) Dario Franchitti	Team Green	20.201	168.586	12
13	39	(United States) Michael Andretti	Team Motorola	20.205	168.552	13
14	7	(Italy) Max Papis	Team Rahal	20.297	167.788	14
15	1	(Brazil) Gil de Ferran	Team Penske	20.319	167.607	15
16	20	(Brazil) Roberto Moreno	Patrick Racing	20.353	167.327	16
17	11	(Brazil) Christian Fittipaldi	Newman/Haas Racing	20.406	166.892	17
18	5	(Japan) Toranosuke Takagi	Walker Racing	20.414	166.827	18
19	52	(Japan) Shinji Nakano	Fernández Racing	20.455	166.492	19
20	33	(Canada) Alex Tagliani	Forsythe Racing	20.459	166.460	20
21	66	(Italy) Alex Zanardi	Mo Nunn Racing	20.505	166.086	21
22	32	(Canada) Patrick Carpentier	Forsythe Racing	20.549	165.731	22
23	18	(New Zealand) Scott Dixon	PacWest Racing	20.681	164.673	23
24	25	(Brazil) Max Wilson	Arciero-Brooke Racing	21.117	161.273	24
25	12	(France) Nicolas Minassian	Chip Ganassi Racing	—	—	25

== Warm-up ==
The drivers took to the track at 9:00 a.m. Eastern Standard Time (UTC−05:00) on Sunday for a 30-minute warm-up session. Bräck posted the fastest time of the session at 20.894 seconds, with Castroneves in second, Takagi third, Junqueira fourth, and Carpentier fifth. Papis' left-rear tire was punctured, causing CART to issue a caution flag to inspect the track. Later in the session, Dixon and Wilson both spun on the front stretch in separate incidents.

== Race ==
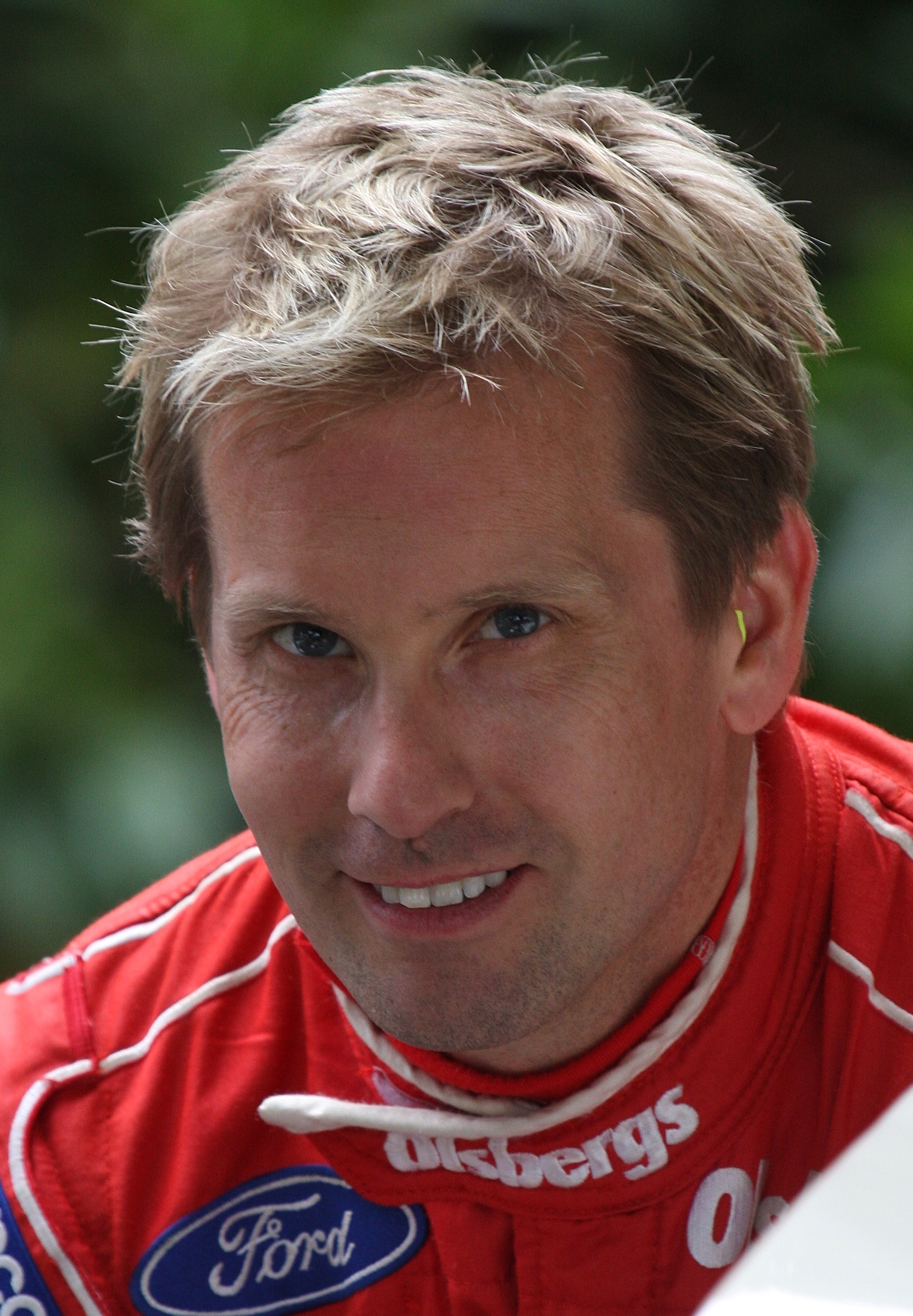
Kenny Bräck (pictured in 2011) led the most laps, but finished in second place.

The cloudy weather that dampened Saturday's track activities gave way for sunny skies on Sunday. Air temperatures were recorded from 67 to 68 °F (19 to 20 °C), while track temperatures ranged from 112 to 114 °F (44 to 46 °C). Approximately 25,000 spectators attended the race. Roger Penske commanded the drivers to start their engines. The drivers lined up two-by-two for a rolling start and the race began at 1:05 p.m. Bräck pulled ahead of Junqueira in the first turn to take the lead, as did Servià to Jourdain for third place. Shortly after, the first caution flag of the race was flown when Bryan Herta spun to the inside of the track and sustained minimal front wing damage. As the field prepared to restart on lap four, Castroneves spun in the third turn and lost six positions, causing the second caution to be thrown. Meanwhile, Servià overtook Junqueira for second place. During the caution period, Dixon made a pit stop for 3 U.S. gal (11 L) of fuel as part of his race strategy.

Green-flag racing resumed on the tenth lap, with Bräck, Servià, Junqueira, Jourdain, and Fernández in the top-five. Carpentier's car experienced an engine failure on lap 29, forcing him to retire from the race. As for leader Bräck, his advantage over Servià had grown to five seconds by the 30th lap. It began to dwindle, however, as Bräck struggled to maneuver around Dixon, who was also stuck behind Alex Zanardi. When Dixon finally passed Zanardi on the 48th lap, Zanardi aggressively blocked Bräck in the first turn. It took 20 laps for Bräck to lap Zanardi. On lap 73, the third caution was issued for Jourdain, who spun from fourth place on the front stretch. Though his car was undamaged, he dropped a lap down. All of the leaders chose to make pit stops under the caution; Bräck and Servià maintained their top-two positions, while Cristiano da Matta improved from sixth to third and Junqueira fell from third to 11th. Tracy also lost several positions as he was inadvertently blocked in by da Matta's crew. Papis, meanwhile, retired from the race with a gearbox malfunction.

The race restarted on lap 82, and Bräck took off from the rest of the field once again, gaining a 2.4-second lead ahead of Servià over the next 30 laps. Castroneves also managed to climb his way up to the fifth position on the restart. On lap 113, Takagi spun coming out of the fourth corner, bringing out the caution for the fourth time. He managed to keep the car off the wall and drove off without stopping. Vasser, Tracy, Junqueira, Dixon, and four other drivers pitted for tires and fuel on the 116th lap while the leaders stayed on track. A restart on lap 119 was followed two laps later by the race's fifth caution flag. De Ferran attempted to pass Tagliani entering turn three, but Tagliani did not see de Ferran and steered into his path, causing both cars to crash into the wall. The caution was prolonged to allow safety crews to extract Tagliani from his car. He complained of muscle soreness on the left side of his back and was transported to the CART medical center, where he was examined by Dr. Stephen Olvey.

During the caution period, the top four drivers (Bräck, Servià, da Matta, and Fernández) stopped for tires and fuel on the 124th lap. Bräck was the first to exit pit road and rejoined the race in tenth, which allowed Tony Kanaan, Dario Franchitti, Shinji Nakano, Tracy, Dixon, Jimmy Vasser, Christian Fittipaldi, Jourdain, and Junqueira to assume the top-nine positions. The first three drivers would be forced to pit after having remained on the track since lap 76, while drivers in positions four-through-nine would have to rely on fuel-saving measures to make it to the end of the race without stopping. Franchitti was the first of the three leaders to pit on lap 141; by the time he exited pit road, he had fallen to 16th place. Nine laps earlier, Herta retired from the race because of a mechanical issue.

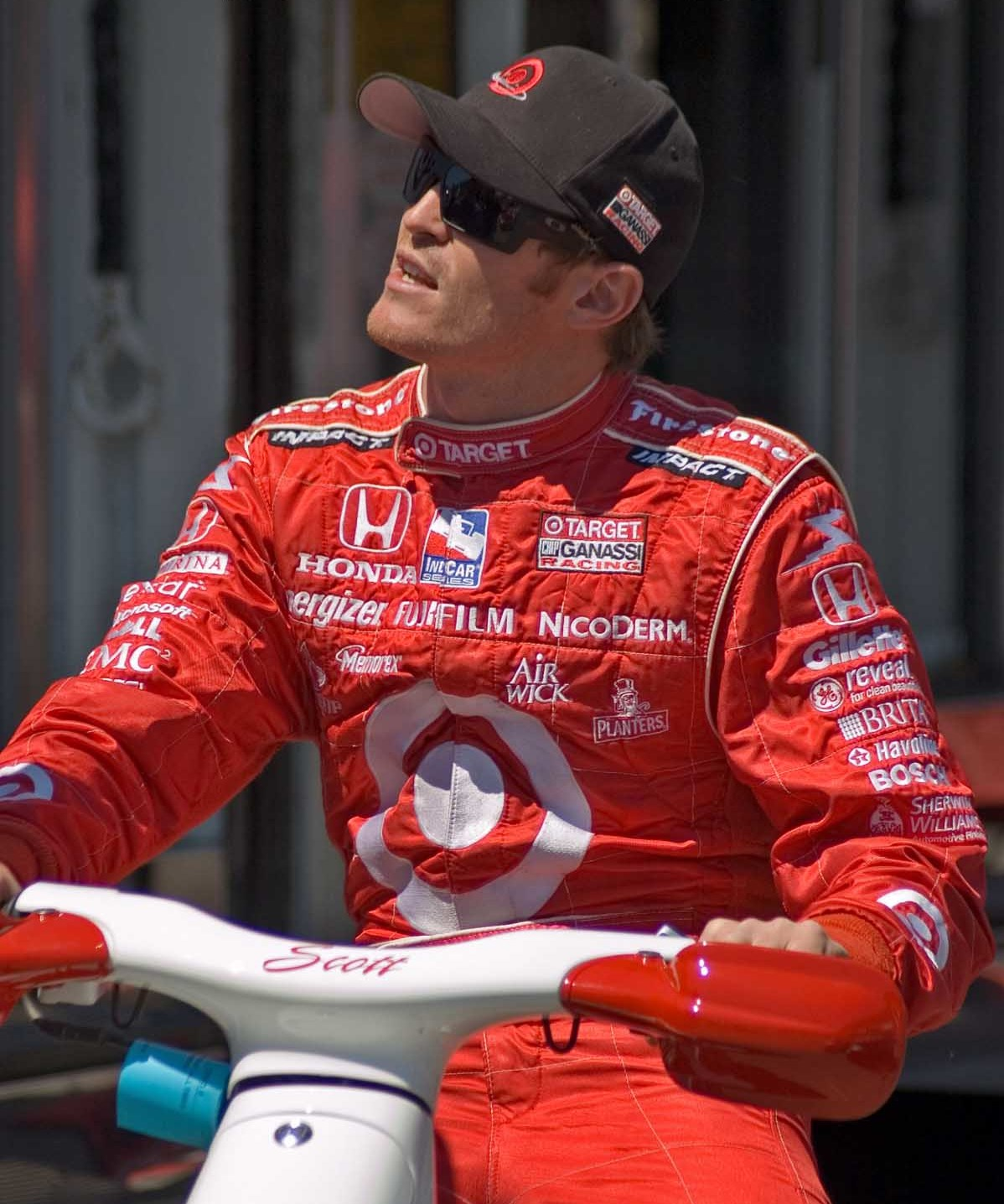
Scott Dixon (pictured in 2007) earned his first and only CART win.

Kanaan led the field back up to speed on the 143rd lap. Bräck immediately began climbing up the running order, jumping from ninth to seventh on the restart. As Nakano made several unsuccessful attempts to overtake Kanaan for the lead, Bräck passed Fittipaldi for sixth on the 161st lap and Vasser for fifth on the 164th lap, while Dixon got by Tracy for the third position. Tracy was then passed by Bräck on lap 167, dropping him to fifth. One lap later, Zanardi was handed a stop-and-go penalty for speeding on pit road. Nakano gave up the second position to pit for fuel on the 182nd lap and lost a lap to the leaders. Fernández pulled into pit road on lap 187 with an electrical issue that kept him from completing any more laps. On lap 190, Kanaan relinquished the lead to Dixon for fuel, but not before nearly colliding into Bräck as he steered to pit road. As Bräck struggled to gain pace exiting the corners, Dixon opened a 0.9-second gap over him by the 210th lap.

The sixth caution of the race was prompted on lap 215 when Jourdain lost control of his car in the fourth turn and nearly collected Fittipaldi as he spun down the track. With no drivers electing to make a pit stop, the race was restarted three laps later with Dixon leading ahead of Bräck, Tracy, Vasser, and Fittipaldi. Dixon held onto the lead for the last seven laps and earned his first career win in his third CART race. He became the youngest winner in the series' history at the age of 20 years, nine months, and 14 days old. It also marked PacWest Racing's first win in CART since the 1997 Marlboro 500 at California Speedway. Bräck finished second, 0.366 seconds behind Dixon, and Tracy came in third. The remaining points-scoring positions were occupied by Vasser, Fittipaldi, Andretti, Junqueira, Franchitti, Servià, da Matta, Castroneves, and Moreno. Jourdain, Takagi, Nakano, Kanaan, Wilson, and Minassian were the final classified finishers. During the course of the race, the lead was swapped twice between three different drivers. Bräck led a race-high 125 laps, while winner Dixon led once for a total of 36 laps.

=== Post-race ===
During a press conference after the race, Dixon discussed how he managed to successfully save fuel to the end: "Our car was very good exiting the corners. There was a lot of radio communication with the team to see if I could go the distance on fuel quite happily. I saved fuel early in the run and was able to run full rich at the end. I think Kenny and Paul had to conserve a little, and I was able to build a cushion." He admitted he was unsure how the win would affect the team following the death of Maurício Gugelmin's son, but stated that it is "just the lift they’ve needed." PacWest Racing owner Bruce McCaw likened the weekend to a "roller coaster," but praised Dixon for driving "a smart race." Though Dixon never won again in CART, he went on to earn 58 more victories in American open-wheel car racing, all of which came in the Indy Racing League (IRL) IndyCar Series, which rank him second on the all-time wins list as of 2026. This was also the fifth and final win for PacWest Racing before they shut down in May 2002.

Bräck was left disappointed with his runner-up finish and desired to win "one, at least one", saying: "We did a good job all race today. I really don’t know how we got into this position. I’m still surprised where I ended up. I have to look at the replay to see what happened. Scott did a great job because I tried everything." He later stated that he was unable to reel Dixon in because "he didn't make a mistake and there wasn't any traffic at the end to bog him down." Tracy, in third, said that he and his team expected Dixon to pit one more time for fuel, and explained: "I got a little angry on the (third) restart, got the fire in my eyes and got by a couple of guys."

Although Junqueira's seventh-place finish was the best of his career at the time, he spoke on the many mistakes he made throughout the race and hoped to learn from them in order to improve on his oval racing skills. Jourdain was displeased by his 13th-place result and voiced his frustrations about Herta, who he blamed for his spin on lap 73: "I don't know if Bryan had a problem with his car or what, but he was a lap down. At the time I was in fourth place and he let the first three cars go by him with no problem. [...] But he balked me and sent me into the grass." Tagliani, who underwent a medical examination at his hometown, Montreal, explained his side of his and de Ferran's lap-121 accident: "I knew Gil was coming up on the inside pretty fast. I gave him some room but I needed to make the turn. That's when his front right wheel caught my back left tire and sent me sliding somewhat backwards into the wall." De Ferran had a different opinion of the incident, claiming that Tagliani "decided to close the door on me." After the race, he and Team Penske teammate Castroneves traveled to the Indianapolis Motor Speedway to practice for the upcoming Indianapolis 500.

The final race result meant that da Matta and Tracy had tied for the Drivers' Championship lead, with both having scored 40 points. Vasser also shared the third position with de Ferran as they were tied on 30 points. Castroneves rounded out the top-five with one less point than Vasser and de Ferran. Reynard continued leading the Constructors' Cup standings with 58 points, but Lola was still only one point away. By earning a total of 58 points, Toyota took the lead in the Manufacturers' Cup standings; Honda trailed by six points, while Ford-Cosworth was 26 points in arrears with 17 races left in the season. Despite CART's efforts to return to Nazareth Speedway, this would ultimately be the series' last race at the track. The event was included in the rivaling IRL schedule from 2002 to 2004.

=== Race classification ===
Drivers who scored championship points are denoted in bold.

Final race results
Pos.	No.	Driver	Team	Laps	Time/Retired	Grid	Points
1	18	**(New Zealand) Scott Dixon**	**PacWest Racing**	225	1:51:12.419	23	**20**
2	8	**(Sweden) Kenny Bräck**	**Team Rahal**	225	+0.366	2	**17**^{1}
3	26	**(Canada) Paul Tracy**	**Team Green**	225	+1.344	8	**14**
4	40	**(United States) Jimmy Vasser**	**Patrick Racing**	225	+1.744	11	**12**
5	11	**(Brazil) Christian Fittipaldi**	**Newman-Haas Racing**	225	+4.225	17	**10**
6	39	**(United States) Michael Andretti**	**Team Motorola**	225	+6.401	13	**8**
7	4	**(Brazil) Bruno Junqueira**	**Chip Ganassi Racing**	225	+9.193	1	**7**^{2}
8	27	**(United Kingdom) Dario Franchitti**	**Team Green**	225	+9.292	12	**5**
9	22	**(Spain) Oriol Servià**	**Sigma Autosport**	225	+12.321	4	**4**
10	6	**(Brazil) Cristiano da Matta**	**Newman-Haas Racing**	225	+12.557	9	**3**
11	3	**(Brazil) Hélio Castroneves**	**Team Penske**	225	+13.379	5	**2**
12	20	**(Brazil) Roberto Moreno**	**Patrick Racing**	225	+14.207	16	**1**
13	16	**(Mexico)** Michel Jourdain Jr.	Bettenhausen Racing	224	+1 lap	3	
14	5	(Japan) Toranosuke Takagi	Walker Racing	224	+1 lap	18	
15	52	(Japan) Shinji Nakano	Fernández Racing	224	+1 lap	19	
16	55	(Brazil) Tony Kanaan	Mo Nunn Racing	224	+1 lap	10	
17	25	(Brazil) Max Wilson	Arciero-Brooke Racing	222	+3 laps	24	
18	12	(France) Nicolas Minassian	Chip Ganassi Racing	220	+5 laps	25	
19	51	(Mexico) Adrián Fernández	Fernández Racing	186	Electrical	6	
20	66	(Italy) Alex Zanardi	Mo Nunn Racing	167	Gearbox	21	
21	77	(United States) Bryan Herta	Forsythe Racing	132	Clutch	7	
22	33	(Canada) Alex Tagliani	Forsythe Racing	120	Contact	20	
23	1	(Brazil) Gil de Ferran	Team Penske	120	Contact	15	
24	7	(Italy) Max Papis	Team Rahal	76	Gear Cable	14	
25	32	(Canada) Patrick Carpentier	Forsythe Racing	28	Electronics	22	

Notes

- **^1** – Includes one bonus point for leading the most laps.
- **^2** – Includes one bonus point for being the fastest qualifier.

== Broadcasting ==
In the United States, the race was broadcast live on ABC. Paul Page was the play-by-play commentator, and former CART driver Parker Johnstone provided driver analysis. Jon Beekhuis and Gary Gerould reported from pit road. The broadcast received a 1.3 overnight rating, a 1.1 final national rating, and a 4 share. The qualifying session, which was shown tape-delayed on ESPN2, had a national rating of 0.1.

== Championship standings after the race ==
Drivers' Championship standings
+/-	Pos.	Driver	Points
	1	(Brazil) Cristiano da Matta	40
2	2	(Canada) Paul Tracy	40 (–0)
2	3	(United States) Jimmy Vasser	30 (–10)
1	4	(Brazil) Gil de Ferran	30 (–10)
2	5	(Brazil) Hélio Castroneves	29 (–11)

Constructors' Cup standings
+/-	Pos.	Constructor	Points
	1	(United Kingdom) Reynard	58
	2	(United Kingdom) Lola	54 (–4)

Manufacturers' Cup standings
+/-	Pos.	Constructor	Points
1	1	(Japan) Toyota	58
1	2	(Japan) Honda	52 (–6)
	3	(United Kingdom) Ford-Cosworth	32 (–25)

== Notes ==
Previous race: 2001 Firestone Firehawk 600	CART FedEx Championship Series; 2001 season	Next race: 2001 Firestone Firehawk 500
Previous race: 2000 Lehigh Valley Grand Prix	Lehigh Valley Grand Prix	Next race: 2002 Firestone Indy 225 (Indy Racing League event)
