= Whitey (drugs) =

Slang term associated with certain forms of recreational drug use

A whitey or white-out (sometimes greening or green-out) is a drug slang term for when a recreational drug user, as a direct or indirect result of drug use (usually cannabis), begins to feel faint and vomits. The term derives from the "whiteout" weather condition where a snowstorm causes loss of vision, and also refers to the way one's skin turns pale during and after a fainting or vomiting episode. While fainting is usually only a problem for those with low blood pressure, it can become possible for those without hypotension to faint after using cannabis or other drugs which have the short-term effect of lowering blood pressure.

Whiteying is perceived by the stoner subculture as the result of using too much cannabis within too short a period of time. This is known as greening out. The factors that usually facilitate fainting are tiredness, lack of fluids and/or food, a hot and humid environment, and natural hypotension. Moreover, of note is that a frequent occurrence of these symptoms is likewise preceded by the consumption of cannabis or hashish mixed with tobacco and that the initial symptoms of nicotine poisoning. It is possible to experience a whitey having used only what may be regarded as a moderate dosage. Whiteying sometimes involves vomiting and shakiness. These episodes generally only last around 15–20 minutes.
