= G-LOC =

Loss of consciousness due to sustained high acceleration

Illustration of g-force on manipulating an airplane (when changing the flight direction toward the outer space, the pilot and plane are "pushed" down to the ground)

G-force induced loss of consciousness (abbreviated as G-LOC, pronounced "JEE-lock") is a term generally used in aerospace physiology to describe a loss of consciousness occurring from excessive and sustained g-forces draining blood away from the brain causing cerebral hypoxia. The condition is most likely to affect pilots of high performance fighter and aerobatic aircraft or astronauts, but is possible on some extreme amusement park rides. G-LOC incidents have caused fatal accidents in high performance aircraft capable of sustaining high g for extended periods. High-g training for pilots of high performance aircraft or spacecraft often includes ground training for G-LOC in special centrifuges, with some profiles exposing pilots to 9 gs for a sustained length of time.

== Effects of g-forces ==
Under increasing positive g-force, blood in the body will tend to move from the head toward the feet. For higher intensity or longer duration, this can manifest progressively as:

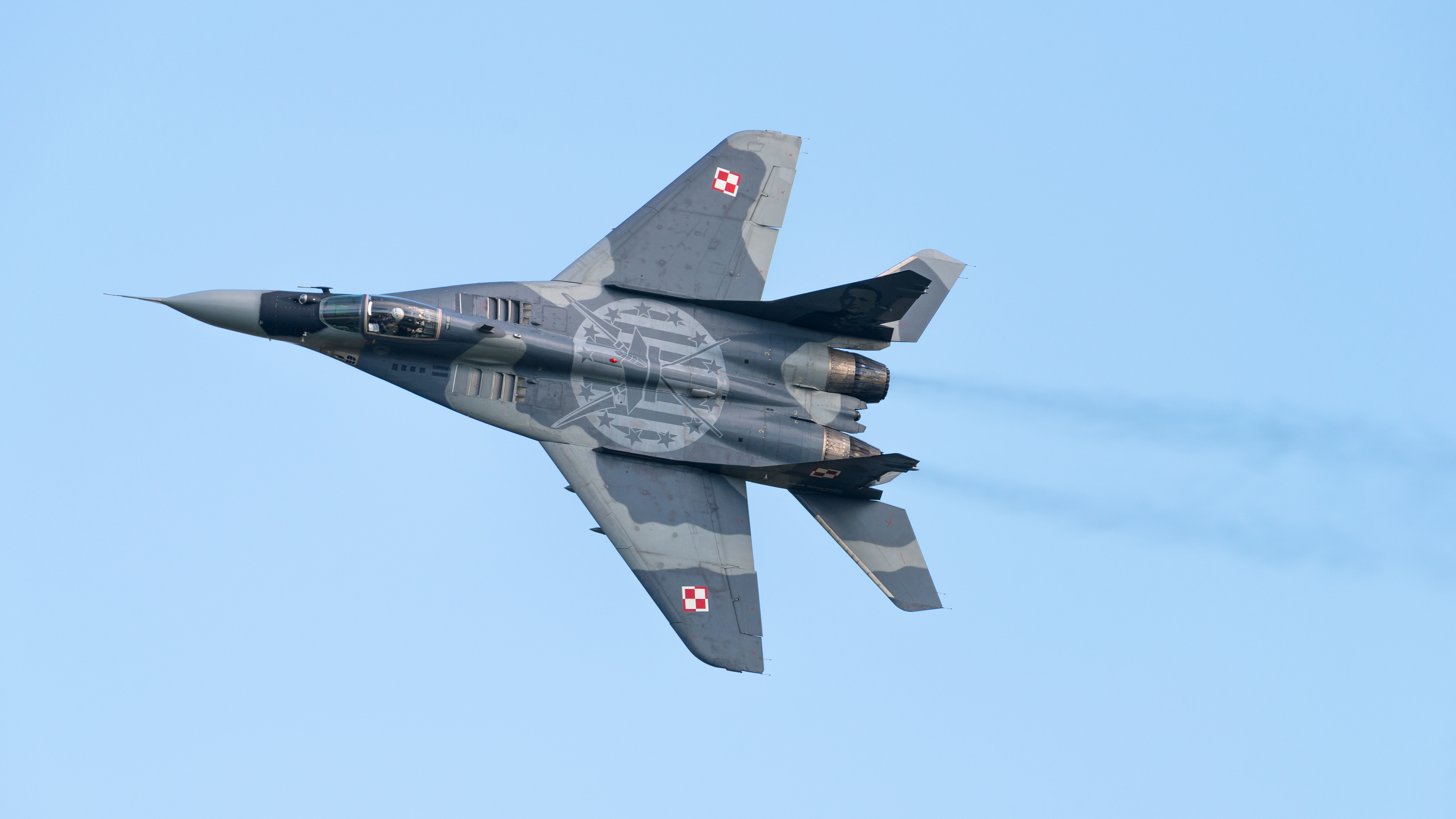
Jet pilots conduct training to prevent the effects of increasing g-forces, such as to be consciously able to recognize the beginning of tunnel vision or greyout.

- Tunnel vision – loss of peripheral vision, retaining only the center vision;
- Greyout – a loss of color vision;
- Blackout – a complete loss of vision, but retaining consciousness; and
- G-LOC – where consciousness is lost.

The effects of g-forces can be felt on a roller coaster ride.

Under negative g, blood pressure will increase in the head, which could result in the dangerous condition known as redout.

Due to the high level of sensitivity that the eye’s retina has to hypoxia, symptoms are usually first experienced visually. As the retinal blood pressure decreases below Intraocular pressure (usually 10–21 mm Hg), blood flow begins to cease to the retina, first affecting perfusion furthest from the optic disc and central retinal artery with progression towards central vision. Skilled pilots can use this loss of vision as their indicator that they are at maximum turn performance without losing consciousness. Recovery is usually prompt following removal of g-force, but a period of several seconds of disorientation may occur. Absolute incapacitation is the period of time when the aircrew member is physically unconscious and averages about 12 seconds. Relative incapacitation is the period in which the consciousness has been regained, but the person is confused and remains unable to perform simple tasks. This period averages about 15 seconds. Upon regaining cerebral blood flow, the G-LOC victim usually experiences myoclonic convulsions (sometimes called the ‘funky chicken’) and full amnesia of the event is often experienced. Brief but vivid dreams have been reported to follow G-LOC. If G-LOC occurs at low altitude, this momentary lapse can prove fatal, and even highly experienced pilots can pull straight to a G-LOC condition without first perceiving the visual onset warnings that would normally be used as the sign to back off from pulling any more gs.

The human body is much more tolerant of g-force when it is applied anteriorly to posteriorly (front to back or Gx) than when applied longitudinally (along the length of the body). However, most sustained g-forces incurred by pilots are applied longitudinally. This has led to experimentation with prone pilot aircraft designs which lies the pilot face down or (more successfully) reclined positions for astronauts. A similar concept, the supine cockpit exists.

== Thresholds ==
The g thresholds at which these effects occur depend on the training, age and fitness of the individual. An untrained individual not used to the G-straining manoeuvre can black out between 4 and 6 g, particularly if this is pulled suddenly. A trained, fit individual wearing a g suit and practicing the straining manoeuvre can, with some difficulty, sustain up to 12-14g without loss of consciousness. The Blue Angels regularly sustain 3–5 second bursts of 7.5 g thresholds.

== See also ==
- Index of aviation articles
- 2015 Shoreham Airshow crash, an accident claimed by the pilot to be caused by G-LOC.
- g-forces
- G-suit
- Junkers Ju 87 WWII investigations in to G-LOC
- Redout
- Firestone Firehawk 600, a Champ Car race that was cancelled due to the g-loads the drivers were experiencing being high enough to cause G-LOC.
- Euthanasia Coaster, a hypothetical roller-coaster designed to cause all passengers to suffer a fatally prolonged G-LOC.
