= Blackout Day =

Anti-black racism campaign day

Blackout Day refers to social media events and activist campaigns organized in response to anti-Black racism. These events typically occur over a 24-hour period, during which activists associated with the Black Lives Matter movement encourage supporters to take part in protests and other symbolic actions. Previous campaigns have urged participants either to refrain from spending money or to support only Black-owned businesses during Blackout Day.

The primary stated purpose of Blackout Day originally focused on the media representation of Black people, rather than on police brutality, which became a major focus later, particularly after the events of 2020. Sharing content created by or featuring Black creators of any nationality is another common feature of the campaign on social media. Specific hashtags, such as #TheBlackout and #BlackoutDay, are used to connect users and raise awareness of related content. Blackout Day originated on March 6, 2015. Since December 21, 2015, and starting March 6, 2016, it has typically been observed on the sixth day of every third month.

In 2020, Blackout Day received increased attention on social media following the murder of George Floyd, the shooting of Breonna Taylor, the death of Elijah McClain, and the shooting of Tony McDade. Other instances of police brutality have also been cited as contributing factors. In June 2020, Blackout Day gained wider visibility, with many users of platforms such as Instagram and Snapchat posting black screens and related Blackout Day hashtags to acknowledge these deaths and raise awareness of police brutality and advocate for police reform. Blackout Day has since been used for various purposes beyond its initial intent.

== Background ==
The event was conceived in early February 2015 by Tumblr user T'von Green. Green had observed a lack of Black representation and a prevalence of Eurocentric beauty standards on social media, particularly on Tumblr.

"I got inspired to propose Blackout Day after thinking, 'Damn, I'm not seeing enough Black people on my dash.' Of course, I see a constant number of Black celebrities but what about the regular people? Where is their shine?"

He noted that depictions of Black people were often negative. Research indicates that negative portrayals of Black people in the media can adversely affect the self-perception of members of the Black community. These images are accessible to anyone with media access. Although images of Black people have increased in mass media, their representation has been disproportionately negative, often linked to violence and crime. When not depicted as criminals, Black people are often represented as entertainers such as athletes or musicians. These polarized identities leave a range of people within the Black community feeling unrepresented. While associating Black people with athleticism is not inherently harmful, it can be detrimental when it is the sole association made. Green believed there was a need for positive and relatable images of the Black community on social media platforms.

Concerned about these issues, Green sought feedback on his idea via Tumblr. Through these interactions, he met Marissa Sebastian, who created the movement's name and later became its PR and CEO, and Tumblr user V. Matthew King-Yarde (known as Nukrik), who created the event's logos.

Blackout Day was organized as a 24-hour event in which participants shared images of Black individuals on social media. Organizers stated the goal was to increase the visibility of ordinary Black people online and challenge stereotypes through selfies, videos, GIFs, and other media, aiming to combat stereotypes. The idea spread once it was named and gained supporters within the Black Tumblr community. An official website was created to provide the online Black community with information on the event's timing and participation methods. Before the event, the creators posted guidelines on who could participate and how.

After the initial event, the creators decided to make it a monthly occurrence on the first Friday of every month. However, the frequency was debated by supporters; some felt it would lose impact if it were too frequent, suggesting a yearly event on the launch day, while others thought it should be more frequent. It was then changed to a seasonally themed event occurring on September 21 and December 21 until January 2016, after which it was set for the 6th day of every third month. Each Blackout Day was themed around Black heritage or history, and participants were encouraged to post content related to the theme.

== Guidelines ==
The stated guidelines for Blackout Day are:

- If you are Black, either from Africa or from within the African diaspora, or of mixed Black heritage, post a picture of yourself for others to view and re-blog/re-tweet/re-post.
- Tag or mention #Blackoutday or #TheBlackout.
- Scroll through the tag and re-blog, re-tweet, or re-post photos to support others.
- Non-Black people can re-blog posts in the tags to show support.
- Support posts with lower numbers of likes and re-blogs as well.

Official hashtags used include #TheBlackout and #BlackoutDay.

== Reception and proliferation ==
According to the Twitter analytics service Topsy, the hashtag #BlackOutDay was one of the top trending hashtags on Twitter in the United States, with over 58,000 tweets by noon, and was a trending topic on Facebook. The creators initiated dialogue about race and the portrayal of Black people in the media, both online and offline.

Outside social media, they sought to continue these dialogues through partnerships, including a deal with Book Riot to sponsor 22 Black readers and writers. However, the event faced opposition, with hashtags such as #Whiteout being created as a public objection. The principle was similar to Blackout Day but featured selfies of white people. The creators addressed this issue by reiterating their movement's goal.

Other minority groups have created similar variations, such as #Yellowoutday and #Brownoutday, though with limited success. The original creators suggested such efforts be more original and recommended creating tags more distinguishable from theirs.

== Criticisms ==
Blackout day has received various criticisms since its launch, with some saying that the campaign was racist.
