= Greyout =

Visual dimming caused by hypoxia

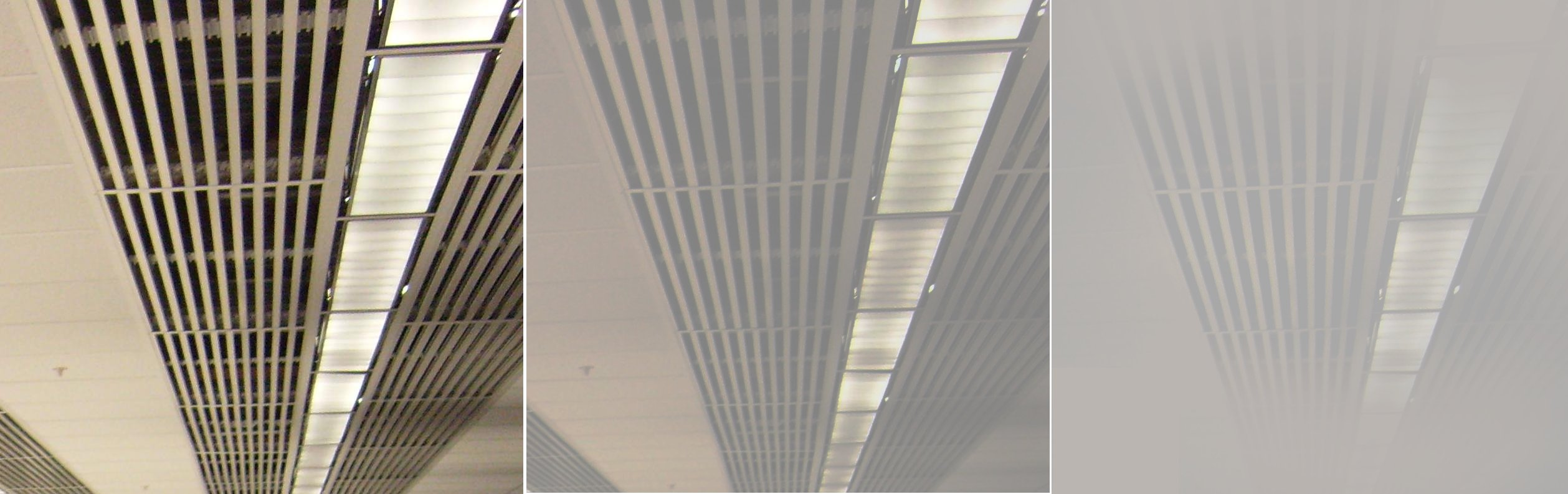
Simulated stages of a greyout.

A greyout is a transient loss of vision characterized by a perceived dimming of light and colour, sometimes accompanied by a loss of peripheral vision. It is a precursor to fainting or a blackout and is caused by hypoxia (low brain oxygen level), often due to a loss of blood pressure.

Greyouts have a variety of possible causes:

- Shock, such as hypovolemia, even in mild form such as when drawing blood.
- Standing up suddenly (see orthostatic hypotension), especially if sick, hangover, or experiencing low blood pressure.
- Fatigue
- Hyperventilation, paradoxically: self-induced hypocapnia, such as in the fainting game or in shallow water blackout.
- Overexertion
- Severe episodes of coughing or sneezing
- Panic attack

Possible symptoms include:

- blurred vision
- tunnel vision
- dizziness
- loss of balance
- lightheadedness
- sudden feeling of exhaustion
- breathing accelerates into short quick breaths
- respiratory acidosis (“hot breath”)
- heart rate spikes rapidly
- blood pressure drops
- oxygen saturation plummets

Recovery is usually rapid. A greyout can be readily reversed by lying down as the cardiovascular system does not need to work against gravity for blood to reach the brain.

A greyout may be experienced by aircraft pilots pulling high positive g-forces as when pulling up into a loop or a tight turn, which forces blood to the lower extremities of the body and lowers blood pressure in the brain. This is the reverse of a redout, or a reddening of the vision, which is the result of negative g-forces caused by performing an outside loop, that is by pushing the nose of the aircraft down. Redouts are potentially dangerous and can cause retinal damage and hemorrhagic stroke. Pilots of high performance aircraft can increase their resistance to greyouts by using a g-suit, which controls the pooling of blood in the lower limbs, but there is no suit yet capable of controlling a redout. In both cases, symptoms may be remedied immediately by easing pressure on the flight controls. Continued or heavy g-force will rapidly progress to g-LOC (g-force induced Loss of Consciousness). Untrained individuals can withstand approximately 4g, while fighter pilots with g-suits are trained to perform 9g maneuvers.

Surprisingly, even during a heavy greyout, where the visual system is severely impaired, pilots can still hear, feel, and speak. Complete greyout and loss of consciousness are separate events.

Another common occurrence of greyouts is in roller coaster riders. Many roller coasters put riders through positive g-forces, particularly in vertical loops and helices. Roller coasters are unlikely to have high enough negative g-forces to induce redouts, as most low-g elements are designed to simulate weightlessness.

== See also ==
- Eigengrau – Illusionary dark gray color
- Phosphene – Visual illusion
- Presyncope – Stage before syncope (fainting)
- Redout – Medical symptom due to negative g-force
- Blackout (disambiguation)
- Brownout (disambiguation)
- Whiteout (disambiguation)
