= Supine cockpit =

A supine cockpit is one in which an aircraft pilot is in a supine position to reduce blood pooling in the legs and prevent g-LOC in hypergravity environments. This can enable the pilot to handle g-forces. It is the opposite of the prone pilot.

== List of supine cockpit aircraft ==
- Aériane Swift
- British Aerospace P.125
- Maupin Carbon Dragon
- Ruppert Archaeopteryx

== See also ==
- Index of aviation articles
