= Apparent weight =

Weight of an object when a force additional to gravity is present

The apparent weight of an object is equal to its gravitational force minus the product of its mass and acceleration.

In physics, apparent weight is a property of objects that corresponds to how heavy an object appears to be. The apparent weight of an object will differ from the ordinary weight of an object whenever the force of gravity acting on the object is not balanced by an equal but opposite contact force. By definition, the weight of an object is equal to the magnitude of the force of gravity acting on it. This means that even a "weightless" astronaut in low Earth orbit, with an apparent weight of zero, has almost the same weight as he would have while standing on the ground; this is due to the force of gravity in low Earth orbit and on the ground being almost the same.

An object that rests on the ground is subject to a contact force exerted by the ground. The contact force acts only on the boundary of the object that is in contact with the ground. This ground reaction force is transferred into the body; the force of gravity on every part of the body is balanced by stress forces acting on that part. A "weightless" astronaut feels weightless due to the absence of these stress forces. By defining the apparent weight of an object in terms of contact forces, one can capture this effect of the stress forces. A common definition is "the force the body exerts on whatever it rests on."

The apparent weight can also differ from weight when an object is "partially or completely immersed in a fluid", where there is an "upthrust" from the fluid that is working against the force of gravity. Another example is the weight of an object or person riding in an elevator. When the elevator begins rising, the object begins exerting a force in the downward direction. If a scale were used, it would be seen that the weight of the object is becoming heavier because of the downward force, changing the apparent weight.

The role of apparent weight is also important in fluidization, when dealing with a number of particles, as it is the amount of force that the "upward drag force" needs to overcome in order for the particles to rise and for fluidization to occur.
