= Lightheadedness =

Sensation of dizziness or that one may faint

- Other names: Pre-syncope
- Specialty: Cardiology; Neurology
- Symptoms: Feeling faint; feeling as though their head is weightless; perceiving the room as spinning (vertigo)
- Duration: Momentary, although recurring for some patients
- Causes: Hypotension, hypoglycaemia, arrhythmia, anaemia, hypokalaemia, thrombosis, water intoxication, dehydration
- Risk factors: Poor dietary or diabetic management, genetic predisposition to cardiac arrhythmia
- Diagnostic method: Based on symptoms. Some thrombotic pre-syncope may be indicated by a troponin serum level.
- Treatment: Dependent on the cause. May include IV fluids, Ringer's Lactate, glucose replacement therapy, thrombolytics, or simply sitting down/resting.

Lightheadedness (also known as pre-syncope) is a common and typically unpleasant sensation of dizziness or a feeling that one may faint. The sensation of lightheadedness can be short-lived, prolonged, or, rarely, recurring. In addition to dizziness, the individual may feel as though their head is weightless. The individual may also feel as though the room is "spinning" or moving (vertigo). Most causes of lightheadedness are not serious and either cure themselves quickly or are easily treated.

Keeping a sense of balance requires the brain to process a variety of information received from the eyes, the nervous system, and the inner ears. If the brain is unable to process these signals, such as when the messages are contradictory, or if the sensory systems are improperly functioning, an individual may experience lightheadedness or dizziness.

== Causes ==
Lightheadedness can be simply (and most commonly) an indication of a temporary shortage of blood or oxygen to the brain due to a drop in blood pressure, rapid dehydration from vomiting, diarrhea, or fever. Other causes are: altitude sickness, low blood sugar, hyperventilation, postural orthostatic tachycardia syndrome (increase in heart rate upon sitting up or standing), panic attacks, and anemia. It can also be a symptom of many other conditions, some of them serious, such as heart problems (including abnormal heart rhythm or heart attack), respiratory problems such as pulmonary hypertension or pulmonary embolism, and also stroke, bleeding, and shock. If any of these serious disorders are present, the individual will usually have additional symptoms such as chest pain, a feeling of a racing heart, loss of speech or a change in vision.

Many people, especially as they age, experience lightheadedness if they arise too quickly from a lying or seated position. Lightheadedness often accompanies the flu, hypoglycaemia, common cold, or allergies. Dizziness could be provoked by the use of antihistamine drugs, like levocetirizine, or by some antibiotics or SSRIs. Nicotine or tobacco products can cause lightheadedness for inexperienced users. Narcotic drugs, such as codeine, can also cause lightheadedness.

== Treatment ==
Treatment for lightheadedness depends on the cause or underlying problem. Treatment may include drinking plenty of water or other fluids (unless the lightheadedness is the result of water intoxication, in which case drinking water is quite dangerous). If a patient is unable to keep fluids down from nausea or vomiting, they may need intravenous fluids such as Ringer's lactate solution. They should try eating something sugary and lying down or sitting and reducing the elevation of the head relative to the body (for example, by positioning the head between the knees).

Other simple remedies include avoiding sudden changes in posture when sitting or lying and avoiding bright lights.

Several essential electrolytes are excreted when the body perspires. When people experience unusual or extreme heat for a long time, sweating excessively can cause a lack of some electrolytes, which in turn can cause lightheadedness.

== See also ==
- Clouding of consciousness
- Dizziness
- Greyout
- Orthostatic hypotension
- Vasovagal response
- Vertigo
