= Whiteout =

Whiteout (including variants white out or white-out) may refer to:

== Arts, entertainment, and media ==
=== Fictional characters ===
- Whiteout (G.I. Joe), a fictional character in the G.I. Joe universe
- Whiteout (Marvel Comics), a comic book supervillain

=== Film and television ===
- Whiteout (2009 film), based on the comic book
- Whiteout (2000 film), a Japanese film directed by Setsurou Wakamatsu
- White Out (Once Upon a Time), an episode of the TV series Once Upon a Time

=== Music ===
==== Albums ====
- White Out (album), a 2000 album by American band Verbow
- Whiteout (album), a 2000 album by rock band Boss Hog
- Whiteout (EP), a 2012 song and eponymous EP by Dawn Richard

==== Songs ====
- "White Out", a 2014 song by Amy Lee featuring Dave Eggar from the album Aftermath
- "Whiteout", a song by Killing Joke on the 1994 album Pandemonium

==== Groups ====
- White Out (band), an American experimental rock group
- Whiteout (band), a Scottish rock group

== Literature ==
- Whiteout (Judge Dredd novel), a 2005 novel by James Swallow
- Whiteout (Follett novel), a 2004 novel by Ken Follett
- Whiteout (Oni Press), a 1998 comic book limited series by Greg Rucka
  - Whiteout: Melt
- Whiteout: The CIA, Drugs and the Press, a history book by Alexander Cockburn and Jeffrey St. Clair

== Sports ==
- White Out (Penn State), a college football tradition at Penn State during its home games against Michigan and Ohio State, where all spectators come dressed in white
- Winnipeg White Out, a hockey tradition started by fans of the Winnipeg Jets

== Other uses ==
- Whiteout (weather)
- Whiteout (video game), a snowmobile racing video game from 2002
- Whiteout Peak, a mountain in Alaska
- Whitey (drugs) or white-out; paleness as a result of drug-related nausea
- White Out, a flavor of Mountain Dew soda
- Wite-Out, a brand of correction fluid
