= Blackout =

Blackout(s), black out, or The Blackout may refer to:

== Loss of lighting or communication ==
- Power outage, a loss of electric power
- Blackout (broadcasting), a regulatory or contractual ban on the broadcasting of an event
- Blackout (fabric), a textile material that blocks light
- Blackout (wartime), the practice of minimizing outdoor lighting for protection from attack
- Communications blackout, a halt to communication abilities or utilization
- Media blackout, censorship of news related to a certain topic
- Protests against SOPA and PIPA, the 2012 web blackout
- Internet blackout, complete or partial failure of the internet services

== Loss of memory ==
- Blackout (drug-related amnesia), loss of memory with medicines or alcoholic beverages
- Blackout or lost time, a common symptom of psychogenic amnesia and dissociative identity disorder
- Syncope (medicine), a loss of consciousness, also known as fainting
- Freediving blackout, a loss of consciousness caused by cerebral hypoxia towards the end of a breath-hold dive
- Transient global amnesia, a temporary inability to establish new memories with otherwise unimpaired cognitive functions
- Blacking out also known as falling-out, a culture-bound syndrome

== Arts and entertainment ==
=== Novels ===
- Blackout (Buffy novel), 2006, based on the television series Buffy the Vampire Slayer
- Blackout (Connie Willis novel), first of a two-part series
- Blackout (Grant novel), third novel of a series by Mira Grant
- Blackout (Elsberg novel), a 2012 disaster thriller by Marc Elsberg
- Blackout (picture book), a 2011 children's novel by John Rocco
- Blackout (young adult novel), 2021, by Dhonielle Clayton, Tiffany D. Jackson, Nic Stone, Angie Thomas, Ashley Woodfolk, and Nicola Yoon
- Black Out (novel), 2008, by Lisa Unger
- Blackout, by Campbell Armstrong
- Blackouts (novel), 2023, by Justin Torres

=== Films ===
- Blackout, American title of Contraband, a British wartime spy film starring Conrad Veidt and Valerie Hobson
- Blackout (1942 film), a Bollywood film
- Blackout (1950 film), a British film
- Murder by Proxy, 1954, also known as Blackout
- Black Out (1970 film), a Swiss film
- Blackout (1978 film), a disaster thriller film
- Blackout (1985 film), an American made-for-television psychological thriller starring Keith Carradine and Richard Widmark
- Blackout (1986 film), a Norwegian film directed by Erik Gustavson and starring Henrik Scheele
- Blackout (1988 film), an American thriller starring Gail O'Grady
- The Blackout (1997 film), an American film directed by Abel Ferrara
- Black Out p.s. Red Out, a 1998 Greek film
- Blackout (2007 film), an American television film starring Jeffrey Wright and Zoe Saldana set during the Northeast Blackout of 2003
- Blackout (2008 American film), a horror film starring Amber Tamblyn and Aidan Gillen
- Blackout (2008 Finnish film)
- The Blackout (2009 film), an American horror film
- Blackout (2010 film), a German television action film
- Black Out (2012 film), a Dutch crime action comedy
- Blade Runner Black Out 2022, a 2017 short film set in the Blade Runner universe
- The Blackout (2019 film), a Russian science fiction thriller
- Blackout (2021 film), a Nigerian drama
- Blackout (2022 film), an American action thriller
- Blackout (2023 film), an American horror film
- Blackout (2024 film), an Indian Hindi-language black comedy thriller

=== Television ===
==== Series ====
- Black Out (TV series), a 2024 South Korean television series
- Blackout (Australian TV show), a 1989–1995 ABC TV series by and about Indigenous Australians
- Blackout (game show), a 1988 American game show
- Blackout (British TV series), a 2012 BBC One drama miniseries

==== Episodes ====
- "Blackout", a 2015 episode of American Experience
- "Black Out", an episode of Batman Beyond
- "The Blackout" (Black Books), 2000
- "Blackout" (Bugs), an episode of the BBC series Bugs
- "The Blackout" (Chowder episode), a 2009 episode of Chowder
- "Blackout" (Lego Ninjago: Masters of Spinjitzu), an episode of Lego Ninjago: Masters of Spinjitzu
- "Blackout" (M.A.S.K. episode), a 1985 episode of M.A.S.K.
- "Blackout!", an episode of season 3 of Phineas and Ferb
- "Blackout!" (Ugly Betty), an episode of the American series Ugly Betty
- "Black Out" (American Horror Story), an episode of the eleventh season of American Horror Story
- "Black Out" (The Professionals), an episode of the crime-action drama series

=== Music ===
==== Bands and record labels ====
- Blackout Records, a record label
- The Blackout (band), a Welsh alternative rock band
- The Blackouts, a Seattle post-punk band
- Blackout (musician), American record producer, engineer and composer

==== Albums ====
- Black Out (The Good Life album), 2002
- Black Out (Woo Won-jae album), 2020
- Black Out (EP), 2024
- Blackout (Scorpions album), 1982
- Blackout (Dominion album), 1998
- Blackout (Hed PE album), 2003
- Blackout (Dropkick Murphys album), 2003
- Blackout (Britney Spears album), 2007
- Blackout (The Brilliant Green album), 2010
- Blackout (Affiance album), 2014
- Blackout (Audrey Horne album), 2018
- Blackout (Steffany Gretzinger album), 2018
- Blackout (From Ashes to New album), 2023
- Blackout! (Method Man & Redman album), 1998
- Blackouts (Ashra album), 1978, by Manuel Göttsching, originally released by Ashra
- Blaque Out, 2001
- The Blackout (album), 2008, by Derek Minor

==== Songs ====
- "Blackout" (Bonnie Anderson song), 2014
- "Blackout" (David Bowie song), 1977
- "Blackout" (Breathe Carolina song), 2011
- "Blackout" (Emilia, Tini and Nicki Nicole song), 2025
- "Blackout" (Linkin Park song), 2010
- "Blackout" (Turnstile song), 2021
- "Blackout" (Wretch 32 song), 2013
- "Blackout", by Allister on the albums Before the Blackout and 20 Years and Counting
- "Blackout", by Asian Kung-Fu Generation on Fanclub
- "Blackout", by Attila on Villain
- "Blackout", by British Sea Power on The Decline of British Sea Power
- "Blackout", by Garbage on Strange Little Birds
- "Blackout", by Lupe Fiasco on Lupe Fiasco's The Cool
- "Blackout", by Funkoars on The Greatest Hits
- "Blackout", by Heatmiser on Dead Air
- "Blackout", by Hybrid on Morning Sci-Fi
- "Blackout", in the musical In the Heights
- "Blackout", by Lovedrug on Pretend You're Alive
- "Blackout", by Mashonda from her debut Japan only album January Joy
- "Blackout", by Heidi Montag on Superficial
- "Blackout", by Muse on Absolution
- "Blackout", by Parkway Drive on Killing with a Smile
- "Blackout", by Pepper on Pink Crustaceans and Good Vibrations
- "Blackout", by Scorpions on Blackout
- "Blackout", by Senses Fail on Life Is Not a Waiting Room
- "Blackout", by Stratovarius on Destiny
- "Blackout", by Sumac on What One Becomes
- "Blackout", by Swans on Filth
- "Blackout", by The Whip on X Marks Destination
- "Blackout", by Unsraw from the EP Calling
- "The Blackout", by Like Moths to Flames from An Eye for an Eye
- "The Blackout", by U2 from Songs of Experience
- The Blackout! The Blackout! The Blackout!, debut EP by Blackout

=== Comics ===
- Blackout (Marcus Daniels), the first character with the name in the Marvel Universe
- Blackout (Lilin), the second character with the name in the Marvel Universe
- Blackout (DC Comics), a character

=== Other uses in arts and entertainment ===
- Blackout, a lighting cue used in theater, film and video
- Blackout (podcast), a suspense/thriller podcast starring and produced by Rami Malek
- Blackout gag, a comedy technique used primarily in animation
- Blackout, a common feature of midnight ghost shows
- Blackout (horror experience), an immersive horror experience derived from haunted house attractions
- Blackout convention, a bidding convention in contract bridge
- Blackout (card game), a British variant of the card game "Oh, Hell"
- Blackout, a downloadable Halo 3 map that is part of the Legendary Map Pack
- The Blackout (professional wrestling), a wrestling stable
- Blackout, a battle royale game mode in Call of Duty: Black Ops 4
- Blackout, a character in the Transformers film series
- Black out performance, a theatrical performance intended for a Black majority audience

== See also ==
- Blackout Day, a digital social campaign occurring on a seasonal basis
- Blackout cake (sometimes Brooklyn Blackout cake), a chocolate cake
- Blackout tattoo, a type of tattoo that involves tattooing an area of the body completely black
- .300 AAC Blackout, a rifle cartridge
