= Tunnel vision =

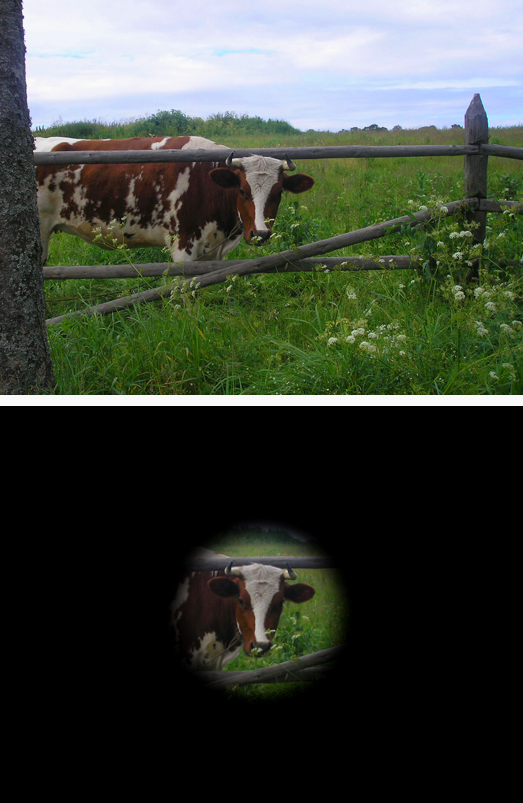
- Simulation of tunnel vision
- Specialty: Ophthalmology

Tunnel vision is the loss of peripheral vision with retention of central vision, resulting in a constricted circular tunnel-like field of vision.

== Causes ==
Tunnel vision can be caused by:

- Glaucoma, a disease of the eye.
- Retinitis pigmentosa, a disease of the eye.
- Blood loss (hypovolemia)
- Alcohol consumption. In addition, the vision becomes blurred or double since eye muscles lose their precision causing them to be unable to focus on the same object.
- Sustained (1 second or more) high accelerations. Typically, flying an airplane with a centripetal acceleration of up to or over 39 m/s^{2} (about 4g) with the head towards the center of curvature, common in aerobatic or fighter pilots. In these cases, tunnel vision and greyout may proceed to a g-force induced loss of consciousness (g-LOC).
- Hallucinogenic drugs, in particular dissociatives.
- Stimulant drugs that release and/or prevent the reuptake of dopamine and norepinephrine, in particular amphetamines.
- Extreme fear or distress, most often in the context of a panic attack.
- Excitement or extreme pleasure such as on a roller-coaster, causing a surge of adrenaline in the body.
- During periods of high adrenaline production, such as an intense physical fight.
- Altitude sickness, hypoxia in passenger aircraft
- Exposure to oxygen at a partial pressure above 1.5-2 atmospheres, producing central nervous system damage from oxygen toxicity. Other symptoms can include dizziness, nausea, blindness, fatigue, anxiety, confusion and lack of coordination.
- Pituitary tumours (or other brain tumours that compress the optic chiasm)
- Prolonged exposure to air contaminated with heated hydraulic fluids and oils, as can sometimes happen in passenger aircraft (different from the so-called "aerotoxic syndrome" which is not a recognized medical diagnosis and is claimed to happen with chronic exposure to substances from aircraft engines)
- Severe cataracts, causing a removal of most of the field of vision
- During the aura phase of a migraine
- Intense anger, causing the body to be rapidly flooded with adrenaline and oxygen
- A bite from a black mamba and other snakes with the same strength venom.
- Mercury poisoning (especially methylmercury)
- Sleep deprivation
- Usher syndrome
- Syncope (fainting)

== Non-medical effects ==
=== Eyeglass users ===
Eyeglass users experience tunnel vision to varying degrees due to the corrective lens only providing a small area of proper focus, with the rest of the field of view beyond the lenses being unfocused and blurry. Where a naturally sighted person only needs to move their eyes to see an object far to the side or far down, the eyeglass wearer may need to move their whole head to point the eyeglasses towards the target object.

The eyeglass frame also blocks the view of the world with a thin opaque boundary separating the lens area from the rest of the field of view. The eyeglass frame is capable of obscuring small objects and details in the peripheral field.

=== Mask, goggle, and helmet users ===
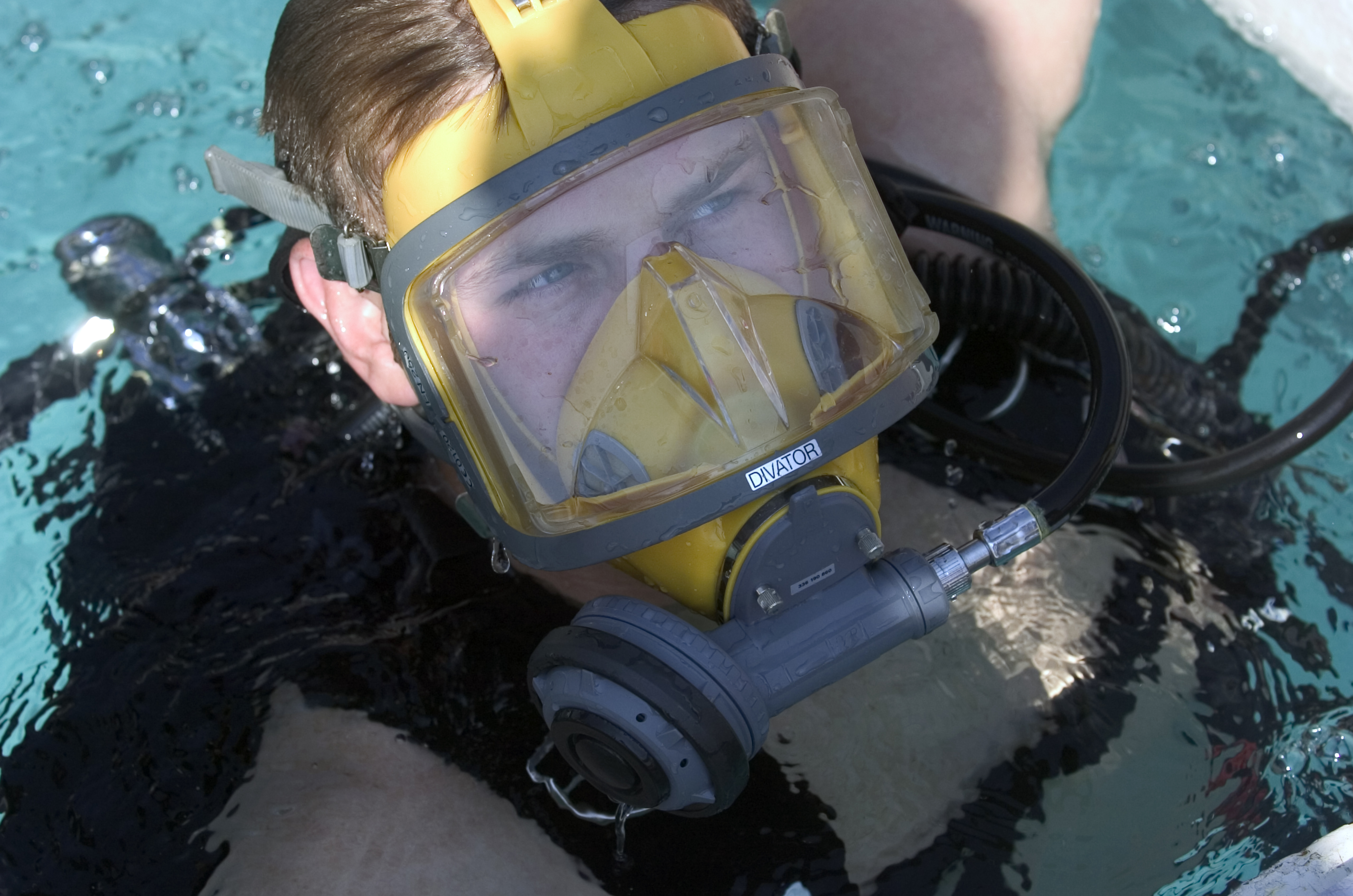
Wide-field, wrap-around diving mask

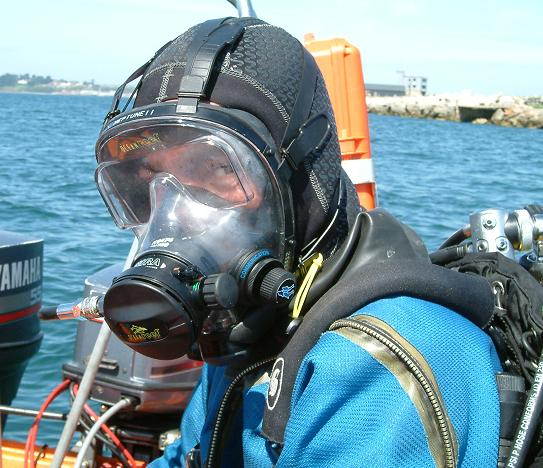
Diving mask with narrow field of view

Activities which require a protective mask, safety goggles, or fully enclosing protective helmet can also result in an experience approximating tunnel vision. Underwater diving masks using a single flat transparent lens usually have the lens surface several centimeters from the eyes. The lens is typically enclosed with an opaque black rubber sealing shell to keep out water. For this type of mask the peripheral field of the diver is extremely limited. Generally, the peripheral field of a diving mask is improved if the lenses are as close to the eye as possible, or if the lenses are large, multi-window, or the mask is a curved wrap-around design.

=== Optical instruments ===
Binoculars, telescopes, and microscopes induce an experience of extreme tunnel vision due to the design of the optical components.

A wide field microscope or telescope generally requires much larger diameter and thicker lenses, or complex parabolic mirror assemblies, either of which results in significantly greater cost for construction of the optical device.

Wide-field binoculars are possible, but require bulkier, heavier, and more complex eyepieces. The diameter of the objective lenses is unimportant for field of view. The widest-angle eyepieces used in telescopes are so large that two would not fit side-by-side for use in binoculars.

== Tunnel vision in glaucoma ==
Glaucoma is the leading cause for irreversible blindness globally. Glaucoma usually starts with no symptoms to start losing peripheral vision, and if untreated, it can leads to a complete loss of peripheral vision, which is tunnel vision, and eventually, central vision will be affected leading to complete blindness. Central vision refers to the range people see that's straight ahead of them, and it's characterized with fine details and better ability to detect color. And peripheral vision is the range outside of fixation. The mechanism underlying this procedure starts with an imbalance between aqueous humor secretion and aqueous humor drainage. In the eyes, the ciliary body secrets liquids in the eye, called aqueous humor, after the secretion, the liquid arrives at posterior chamber, which is the space between lens and iris. Then the liquid goes past the pupil to arrive at the anterior chamber, the space between iris and cornea, and eventually goes out of the eye through the connective tissue called trabecular meshwork. In healthy eyes, the drainage and the secretion of aqueous humor is balanced, but in glaucoma, the drainage is either partially or completely blocked, causing an increased pressure in the eye. The excess aqueous humor will eventually push on the optic nerves at the back of the eye. Peripheral vision loss is often the first symptom in the process since the nerves in the surroundings are the first to be damaged. If untreated, a complete loss of peripheral vision, tunnel vision, occurs.

== Impaired activities ==
=== Driving ===
Because of constant motion, the visual field of a driver is usually not stable. To monitor changes in our environment, peripheral vision plays a big role in signalling us when it will be safe to change lanes, whether a pedestrian is crossing the street, which direction the car in front is turning, and how fast the car is running. Since drivers have expectations of these possible collisional cues to appear in their peripheral vision, they tend to drive safer when these cues are presented peripherally than at fixation. In patients with glaucoma, they have more difficulties in lane maintenance, scanning and vehicle control. In addition, compared to individuals without field defects, people with impaired peripheral visual require longer search time, more fixations with shorter durations, and more errors while driving, influencing their ability to maintain a steady lane and increasing their risks of collision.

=== Walking ===
Similar to driving, walking requires information from peripheral vision as well. When going up or down a staircase, people tend to use their central vision to mark the shift from a level surface to the stairs, but peripheral vision is usually used for filling in detail about the intermediate steps. When the staircase is following a predictable pattern, e.g., the staircase in school, people can walk up and down successfully with their central vision restricted, and when the staircase is less predictable, e.g., irregular steps on mountain trails, people need to use their central vision to fixate on each step. For people with tunnel vision, fixating on each step and stairs climbing up or down stairs is necessary, no matter how predictable the staircase is, and this will result in slower speed climbing the stairs and increased risk to fall.

=== Reading ===
Although the fixation is a more important component in one's ability to read with visual acuity, patients with tunnel vision loss are associated with impairment in reading performance, resulting in slower reading speed, more errors, and slower progression to the next line. In people with glaucoma, the size of their visual span is limited due to the loss of peripheral vision, and the number of words they can see is also less. When measuring a smaller visual span in the central 10° in the visual field, people with glaucoma on average identified 2.3 less words at one glance than people with healthy eye conditions around the same age. Given reading is a crucial skill to understand one's surrounding, e.g., reading directions in the airport, about 60% of patients mentioned reading difficulty as the reason for their referral to the low vision care, and reading problem is a major source of anxiety for Glaucoma patients with slower reading speed, more errors, and slower progression to the next line of text.

=== Scene navigation ===
The parahippocampal place area in the brain is related to scene recognition, and in individuals with normal vision, the processes of recognizing scenes and navigating through them involve distinct cortical neural pathways. The peripheral visual field is associated with magnocellular pathways, processing low spatial frequency information, which encompasses broad details, and the central visual field is linked with parvocellular pathways, responsible for the high spatial frequency information, which captures finer details within a scene. In neuroimaging, peripheral vision is shown to be more important than central vision for categorizing different natural scenes, since the activation of the parahippocampal place area is more significant when scene categorization tasks are shown in the peripheral visual field. In addition, vision is an important part for balancing while interacting with different scenes. Patients with tunnel vision, peripheral vision loss, report implication in postural instability, increasing their chances of falling.

=== Face recognition ===
Occipital lobe is the area in mammal's brains responsible for processing visual inputs. Specifically, the ventral occipital temporal cortex is responsible for face recognition. Although central vision loss is linked with impaired face recognition ability, and little research has focused on face recognition in peripheral vision, a review article mentioned increases in activity in the ventral occipital temporal cortex on fMRI when a facial image is presented in the ipsilateral peripheral visual field, indicating the peripheral vision may play a more important role in face recognition than previously believed. Furthermore, studies examined that Glaucoma patients, who have peripheral vision loss, need shorter distance to recognize faces and gender. Individuals with good central vision but peripheral vision loss performed worse in the Cambridge face memory test, which tests face recognition ability, than control, and they reported more problems in face recognition in a self-report.

== See also ==
- Target fixation, a psychological phenomenon where a person at the controls of a vehicle risks inadvertently colliding with a specific object as a result of intensely focusing on it.
