= Prone pilot =

Aircraft pilot position that is lying down instead of sitting

A prone pilot lies on their stomach rather than seated in a normal upright or reclining position.

During the 1930s, glider designer Reimar Horten began developing a prone position for his flying wing gliders. However it proved uncomfortable and he later settled on a semi-prone arrangement with the knees somewhat lowered.

During World War II it was suggested that a pilot in the prone position might be more effective in some kinds of high-speed aircraft, because it would permit the pilot to withstand a greater g-force in the upward and downward direction with respect to the plane. The fuselage could also be made shallower and therefore have reduced weight and drag. Many speculative designs of the late-war and early postwar periods featured this arrangement, and several prototypes were built or converted to test the idea. However testing revealed difficulties in maintaining a head-up attitude to see forward and in operating some controls. These problems outweighed the advantages and the position was never adopted for high-speed flight.

Many modern hang gliders, developed since the 1960s, typically offer a prone pilot position during flight, with the pilot lowering their legs and standing upright only when taking off or landing.

== List of aircraft with prone pilots ==
Many hang gliders since the 1960s have allowed the pilot to lie prone in flight. These are not included here.

Type	Country	Class	Role	Date	Status	No.	Notes
Akaflieg Berlin B9	Germany						
Akaflieg Stuttgart fs17	Germany						
Armstrong Whitworth AW.171	UK	Supersonic	Experimental	1957	Project	0	Never ordered.
Beecraft Wee Bee	USA	Tractor	Private	1948	Prototype	1	
Blohm & Voss BV 40	Germany						
DFS 228	Germany						
DFS Liege-Kranich	Germany						
Farrar V-1 Flying Wing	USA						
FMA I.Ae. 37	Argentina						
Gillespie Aeroplane	USA	Propeller	Experimental	1905	Prototype	1	Did not fly.
Gloster Meteor F8 "Prone Pilot"	UK	Jet	Experimental	1954	Prototype	1	Conversion of standard aircraft.
Guerchais-Roche Émouchet	France						
Henschel Hs 132	Germany						
Horten H.III	Germany	Glider					
Horten H.IV	Germany	Glider					
Horten H.VI	Germany	Glider					
Ikarus 232 Pionr	Yugoslavia					1	
Ikarus S-451	Yugoslavia	Tractor	Experimental	1952	Prototype	1	Enlarged 232. First 451 built.
Lamson PL-1 Quark	USA						
Northrop XP-79	USA	Jet	Fighter	1945	Prototype	1	Flying wing.
Miller M-5 Belly Flopper	USA	Tractor	Experimental	1946	Prototype	1	Twin-engined homebuilt.
O'Neill Pea Pod	USA		Experimental	1962	Prototype	1	Did not fly.
Reid and Sigrist R.S.3 Desford	UK						
Savoia-Marchetti SM.93	Italy						
Ultra-Efficient Products Penetrater	USA	Pusher	Ultralight	1985			
Wright Flyer	USA	Pusher	Experimental	1903	Prototype	1	
Wright Flyer II	USA	Pusher	Experimental	1904	Prototype	1	
Wright Flyer III	USA	Pusher	Experimental	1905	Prototype	1	Photos also show the pilot sitting up.

== Bibliography ==
- Prizeman, R.; "Getting down to it", Flight, 1953, pp.584 ff. (First page: Internet Archive).
