= Ultra-Efficient Products Penetrater =

American ultralight aircraft

Penetrater
- The Ultra-Efficient Products Penetrater in flight

General information
- Type: Ultralight aircraft
- National origin: United States
- Manufacturer: Ultra-Efficient Products
- Designer: Nick Leighty and Rick Berstling
- Status: Production completed

History
- Introduction date: 1985
- First flight: 1985

The Ultra-Efficient Products Penetrater was an American ultralight aircraft designed by Nick Leighty and Rick Berstling and produced by Ultra-Efficient Products. It was first shown at the 1985 Sun 'n Fun air show.

The aircraft's most notable feature was that the pilot flew in the prone position. The pilot lay on top of the fuselage, and used elbow rests and foot stirrups. The aircraft had a cantilever low-wing, a fuselage consisting of a single aluminum alloy tube, a V-tail, a tricycle landing gear, and a single engine in pusher configuration.

== Specifications (Penetrater) ==
Data from Jane's all the world's aircraft, 1987–88

General characteristics

- Crew: one
- Length: 16 ft (4.9 m)
- Wingspan: 24 ft (7.3 m)
- Height: 6 ft (1.8 m)
- Wing area: 108 sq ft (10.0 m^{2})
- Aspect ratio: 5.33
- Empty weight: 175 lb (79 kg)
- Gross weight: 400 lb (181 kg)
- Fuel capacity: 5 U.S. gallons (19 L; 4.2 imp gal)
- Powerplant: 1 × Zenoah G25B single cylinder, two stroke, 20 hp (15 kW)
- Propellers: 2-bladed, 4 ft 8 in (1.42 m) diameter

Performance

- Maximum speed: 60 mph (97 km/h, 52 kn)
- Cruise speed: 40 mph (64 km/h, 35 kn)
- Stall speed: 24 mph (39 km/h, 21 kn)
- Never exceed speed: 80 mph (130 km/h, 70 kn)
- Range: 250 mi (400 km, 220 nmi)
- Service ceiling: 8,000 ft (2,400 m)
- g limits: ±6
- Maximum glide ratio: 14:1
- Rate of climb: 950 ft/min (4.8 m/s)
- Rate of sink: 250 ft/min (1.3 m/s) @ 40 mph
- Lift-to-drag: 14
- Wing loading: 3.70 lb/sq ft (18.1 kg/m^{2})

== See also ==
Aircraft of comparable role, configuration, and era

- Beecraft Wee Bee
- Farrar V-1 Flying Wing
- Lamson PL-1 Quark
- O'Neill Pea Pod
- Miller M-5 Belly Flopper
