= Panzerblitz =

Panzerblitz can refer to:

- Panzerblitz, a German antitank missile of World War Two
- PanzerBlitz, a wargame from Avalon Hill
