= R4M =

R4M rocket
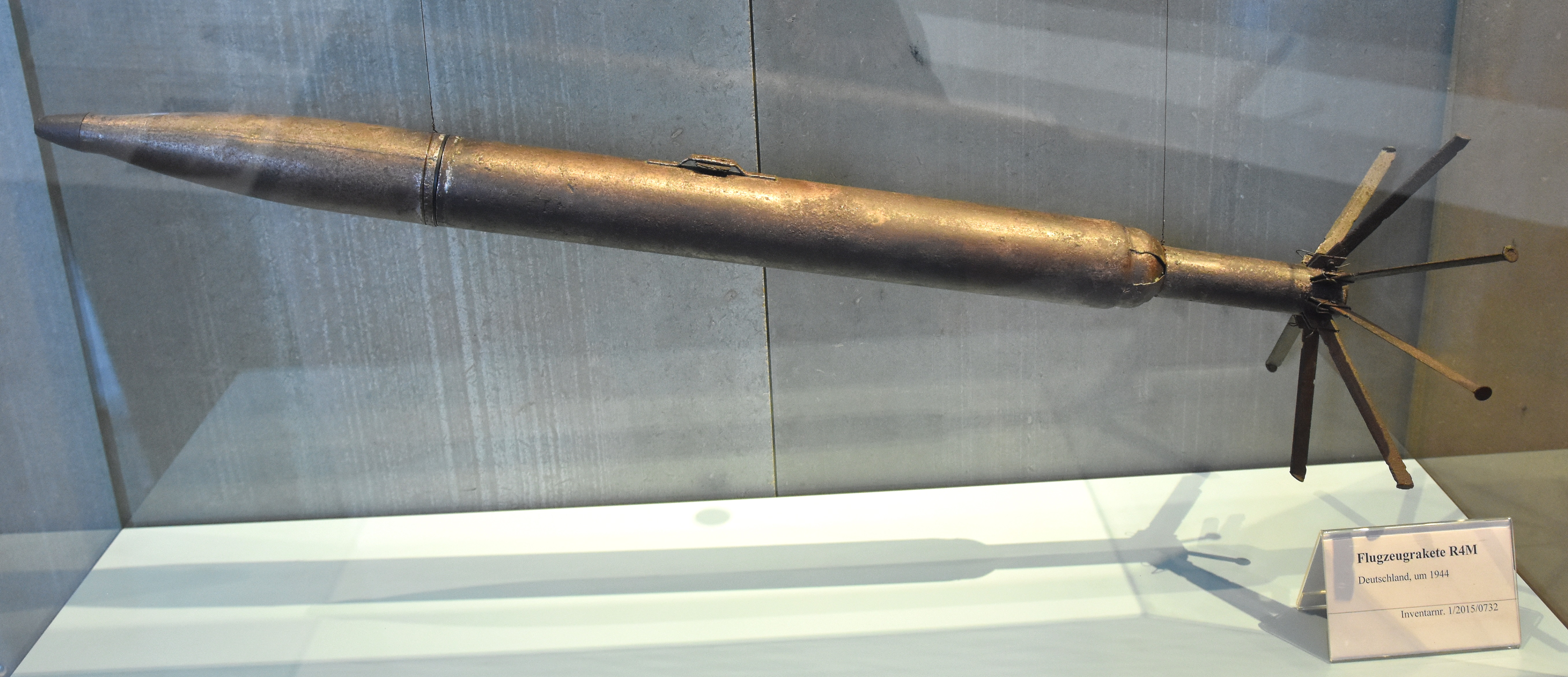
- R4M "Orkan" on display at the German Museum of Technology
- Type: Rocket
- Place of origin: Germany

Service history
- In service: 1944-1945
- Used by: Luftwaffe
- Wars: World War II

Production history
- Designed: 1944
- Manufacturer: Heber AG, Osterode, Germany
- Variants: R4M (air-to-air); R4HL (air-to-ground)

Specifications
- Mass: 3.85 kg (8.49 lb)
- Length: 812 mm (32.0 in)
- Width: 55 mm (2.17 in)
- Muzzle velocity: 525 m/s (1,720 ft/s)
- Effective firing range: 600–1,000 m (656–1,090 yd)
- Maximum firing range: 1,500 m (1,640 yd)
- Filling: HTA 41 (Note: HTA 41 composition: 40% Hexogen (RDX), 45% TNT and 15% aluminium)> (torpex)
- Filling weight: 520 g (1.15 lb)

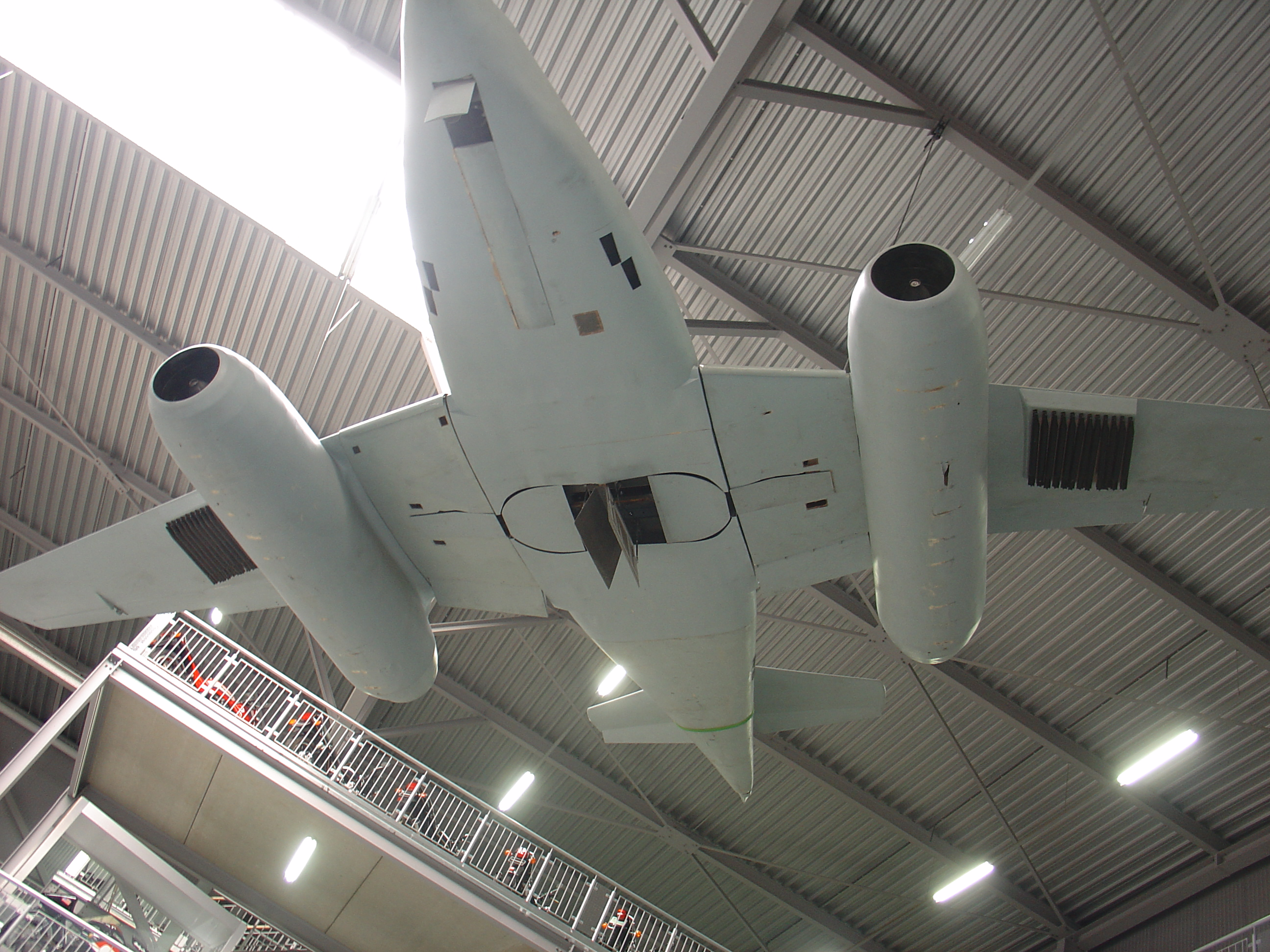
Me 262 with R4M underwing rockets on display at the Technikmuseum Speyer, Germany

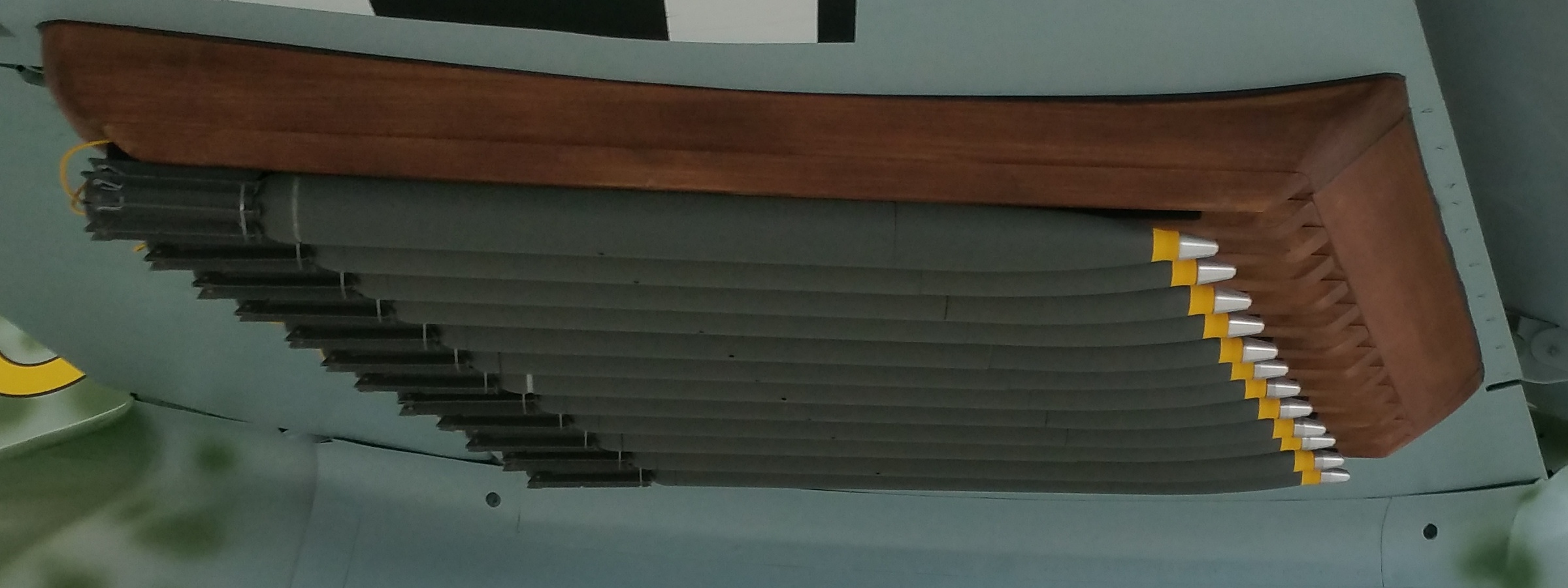
Me 262 with R4M underwing rockets on display at the Evergreen Aviation & Space Museum, United States

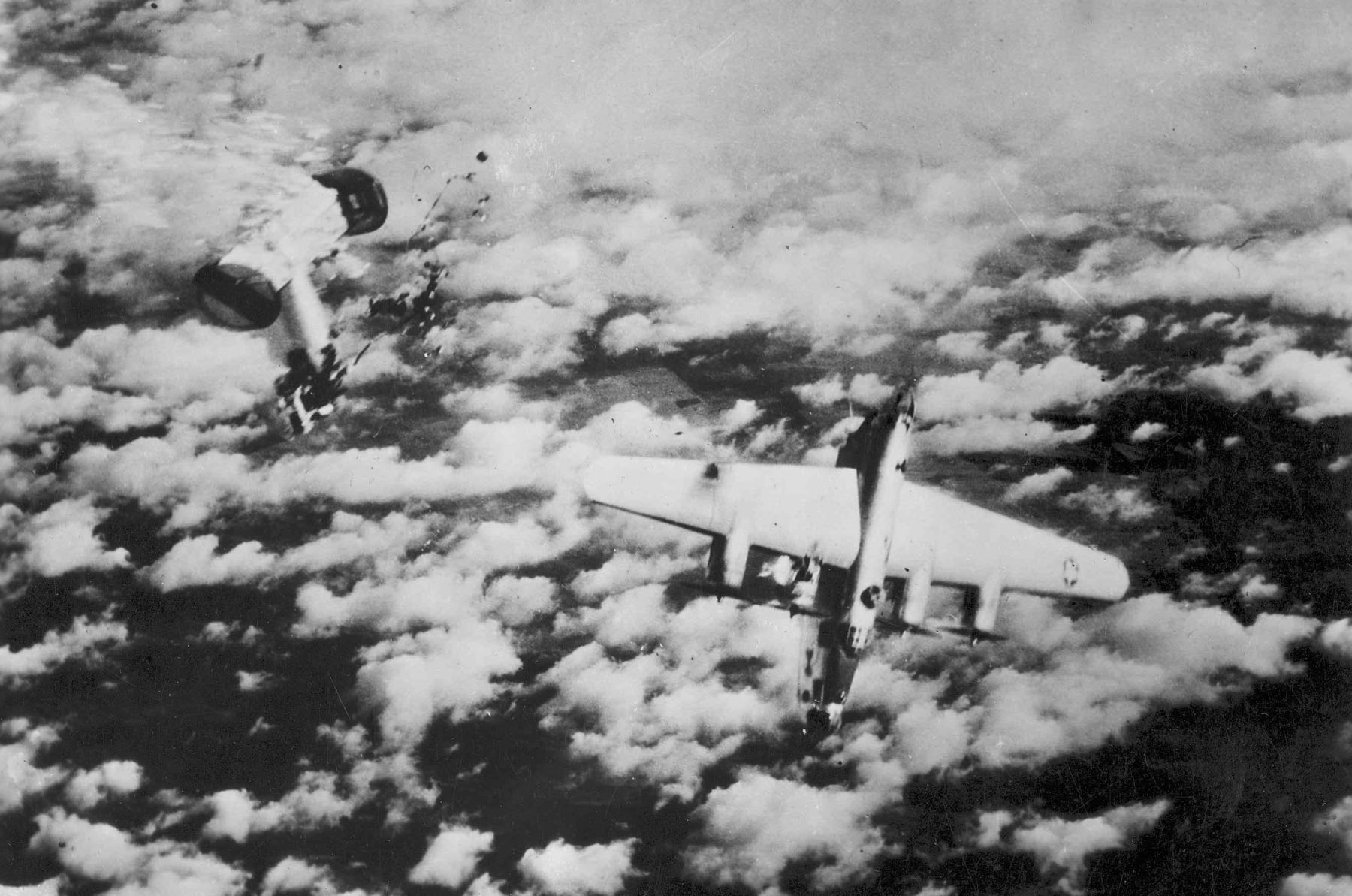
A B-24 shot down by Rudolf Rademacher with the R4M

R4M, abbreviation for Rakete 4 Kilogramm Minenkopf (English: Rocket, 4 kilogram, Mine-head), also known by the nickname Orkan (English: Hurricane) due to its distinctive smoke trail when fired, was a folding-fin air-to-air rocket used by the Luftwaffe at the end of World War II.

The R4M was used on several late war German combat aircraft, most notably the Messerschmitt Me 262, and could be fired from open ramps under aircraft wings or from tubes inside under-wing rocket pods. It featured a high capacity "mine shell" equivalent warhead filled with 520 g (1.15 lb) of the explosive-mixture HTA 41 (also known as HTA 15), which consists of 40% Hexogen (RDX), 45% TNT and 15% aluminium. The shell-walls of the warhead were only 0.8 mm (0.0315 in) thick.

Besides the air-to-air warhead the rocket could also be outfitted with shaped charge warheads for air-to-ground use, then called R4HL for hohlladung (English: hollow charge). These warheads were called Panzerblitz (English: Armor-lightning) and existed in two primary versions: Panzerblitz 2 (PB 2), consisting of an 88 mm Panzerschreck warhead fitted with a ballistic cap, and Panzerblitz 3 (PB 3), consisting of the original 55 mm mine-warhead modified to be a shaped-charge.

== Development ==
The R4M was developed in order to deal with the increasing weight of anti-bomber weapons being deployed by Luftwaffe fighters. The primary anti-bomber weapon of the Luftwaffe for much of the war was the 20 mm MG 151/20 autocannon, which was compact enough to be mounted in an internal wing bay mounting in the Focke-Wulf Fw 190 (up to 4 cannon, or 6 with optional twin-gun underwing pods) and also fitted on the centerline of Bf 109G fighters, firing through the propeller spinner as a Motorkanone. This could be supplemented by an additional pair of cannon in drag-inducing underwing gun pods, but it was found that it took an average of twenty 20 mm hits to shoot down a typical four-engined Allied bomber. The MG 151/20 was subsequently supplemented with or replaced by the 30 mm MK 108 cannon, which replaced the centerline Motorkanone-mount MG 151/20 on many Bf 109's, and could be fitted into slightly larger underwing pods, which could be used on either the Bf 109 or Fw 190. This heavier-caliber cannon could bring down a bomber with an average of one to three hits. However, the MK 108 was much heavier and the larger calibre ammunition made it difficult to carry more than one or two "passes" worth. Worse, the low muzzle velocity of this gun meant it had a very short range and suffered a ballistic drop of over 41 metres at 1,000 metres range after firing. In approaching close enough to get hits, the fighters placed themselves within the range of the dozens of AN/M2 "light barrel" Browning defensive machine guns that a combat box formation of a typical USAAF heavy bomber raid possessed, from nearly any approach direction. The more powerful MK 103 cannon had higher muzzle velocity and increased range, at the cost of greatly increased weight, size (barrel length of 1.34 meters, or 52-3/4 inches) and much lower rate of fire: 380-420 RPM vs. 600-650 RPM for the MK 108.

Also, the Nebelwerfer 42-derived Werfer-Granate 21 (Wfr. Gr. 21, or Bordrakete BR 21) rockets fitted to Messerschmitt Bf 109 and Bf 110, and Focke-Wulf Fw 190 fighters, used to break up the USAAF combat box bomber formations, had launch tubes that were not only drag-producing, due to their exposed five-strut under-wing mounting, but also from the fact that the launch tubes needed to be aimed upwards at some 15° from level flight, to counter the BR 21 rocket projectile's considerable ballistic drop after firing. This added to the already considerable drag the launch tube mountings created, and contributed to the Wfr. Gr 21's relatively slow projectile velocity of 1,150 km/h (320 m/s; 710 mph), approximately 60% of the 505 m/s (1,130 mph) velocity of the MK 108 cannon's shells.

The solution was to replace the underwing gun pods, and the excessively drag-producing large-calibre underwing rocket launch tubes, with a small-diameter solid-fuel rocket-engine-propelled projectile, mounting a warhead similar to that of the cannon shell. Although each "round" was heavier than the corresponding gun-fired shell, the absence of a gun reduced the overall weight considerably. The weight difference was so great that even a much larger and longer-ranged rocket was still lighter than the guns it could replace, although the total number of rounds carried was also reduced from 65 rounds of 30 mm ammunition to only 24 rockets.

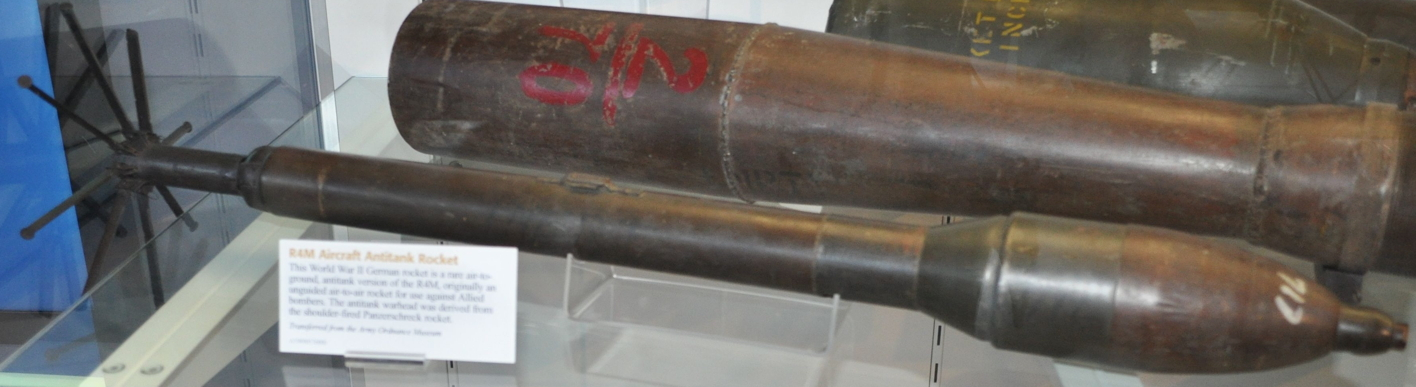
Anti-tank version of the R4M rocket on display at the Steven F. Udvar-Hazy Center.

The anti-aircraft version of the R4M used a large warhead of 55 mm with 520 g (18 oz) of the strongly brisant Hexogen explosive charge, nearly guaranteeing a fighter kill with one hit, from the "shattering" force of its explosive warhead — this was the same explosive used in the shells fired by both the MK 103 (30 × 184 mm cartridge) and MK 108 (30 × 90 mm cartridge) autocannons. Each R4M weighed 3.2 kg and was provided with enough fuel to be fired from 1000 m, just outside the range of the bomber's defensive guns. The main body of the rocket consisted of a simple steel tube with eight base-hinged flip-out fins on the tail for stabilisation (patented by Edgar Brandt in 1930 and also used on the contemporary M8 rocket), deployed immediately after launch. A battery typically consisted of two groups of 12 rockets and when all 24 were salvoed in an attack, they would fill an area about 15 by 30 m at 1000 m, a density that made it almost certain that the target would be hit. The R4Ms were usually fired in four salvos of six missiles at intervals of 7 milliseconds from a range of 600 m, and would supersonically streak towards their target at a sixty percent higher velocity than the Wfr. Gr. 21's rockets would (the BR 21's projectile travelled at some 1150 km/h post-launch), as the R4M typically had a flight speed of roughly 1,890 km/h (1,170 mph). Two warheads were available for the R4M, the common PB-3 with a 0.52 kg charge for anti-aircraft use and the larger shaped charge, similar in construction to the Panzerschreck, the Panzerblitz (PB-2/3), for anti-tank use. The Panzerblitz III, mounting a gigantic 210 mm hollow charge warhead (the same calibre as the BR 21), can be seen as the ultimate development of the basic Orkan rocket. It was intended to be carried (six or eight rockets per plane) by the tank-busting B model of the Henschel Hs 132 jet dive-bomber - however, neither the missile nor the warplane it was exclusively intended for got beyond the prototype stage before the end of the war.

== Operations ==
Only a small number of aircraft were fitted with the R4M, mostly Messerschmitt Me 262s and the ground attack version of the Fw 190s, which mounted them on small wooden racks under the wings. On one occasion, a Me 163A was fitted with several R4M rockets, and this setup was tested for several weeks in 1944, without incident. This was the first time a rocket propelled aircraft has had rocket propelled armament.

The Luftwaffe found the R4M missiles to have a similar trajectory to the 30 mm MK 108 cannon's rounds in flight, so the standard Revi 16B gunsight could be utilized.

== Technical specifications (R4M) ==
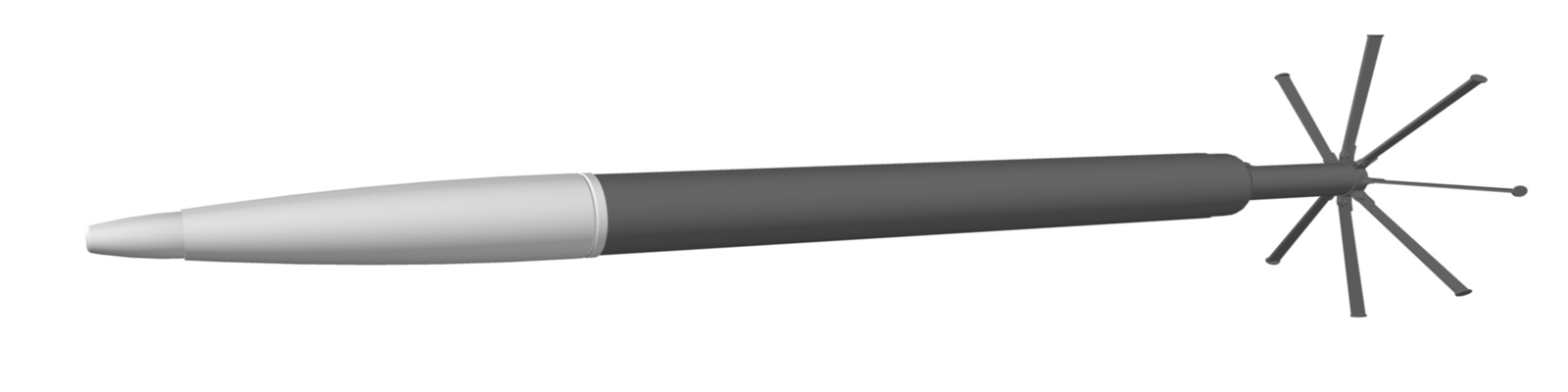
borderless

General

- Name − Rakete, 4 kilogramm, Minenkopf (R4M)
- Type − Folding-fin, Air-to-air rocket
- Total length − 812 mm (32.0 in)
- Total weight − 3.85 kg (8.49 lb)

Warhead

- Type − High-Explosive, High-Capacity
- Caliber − 55 mm (2.17 in)
- Length − 200 mm (7.87 in)
- Wall thickness − 0.8 mm (0.0315 in)
- Explosive Charge − 520 g (1.15 lb) HTA 41 (torpex)
- Fuze model − AzR2 nose fuze
- Fuze length − 65 mm (2.56 in) (total), 15 mm (0.591 in) (internal)

Rocket engine

- Diameter − 55 mm (2.17 in) (engine)
- Length − 410 mm (16.1 in) (engine), 148 mm (5.83 in) (tail section)
- Fin-span − 242 mm (9.53 in)
- Fin-swivel − 100°
- Propellant type − Solid fuel diethylene glycol dinitrate tube
- Propellant dimensions − 340 mm (13.4 in) (length), 12 mm (0.472 in) (internal diameter), 45 mm (1.77 in) (external diameter)
- Propellant weight − 0.815 kg (1.80 lb)
- Combustion chamber − 2.5 mm (0.0984 in) thick venturi-pipe ending with a nozzle
- Nozzle dimensions − 110 mm (4.33 in) (length), (13 mm (0.512 in) (internal top diameter), 45 mm (1.77 in) (internal base diameter)

Performance

- Max thrust − 245 kp (540 lbf)
- Burn time − 0.75 s
- Velocity − 525 m/s (1,720 ft/s) (initial), 125 m/s (410 ft/s) (at 1,000 m (1,090 yd))
- Range − 1,500 m (1,640 yd) (max), 600–1,000 m (656–1,090 yd) (effective)

== See also ==
- 3.5-inch FFAR rocket (US forces)
- 5-inch FFAR rocket (US forces)
- RP-3 (United Kingdom)
- RS-82 (rocket family) (Soviet Union)
