= PL-1 =

PL-1 or PL1 may refer to:

- PL/I, a programming language
- Lamson PL-1 Quark, a glider
- Pazmany PL-1, a trainer aircraft
- K-5 (missile)
