= Botcheston Bog =

UK Site of Special Scientific Interest

Coordinates: 52.637°N 1.284°W

- Site of Special Scientific Interest
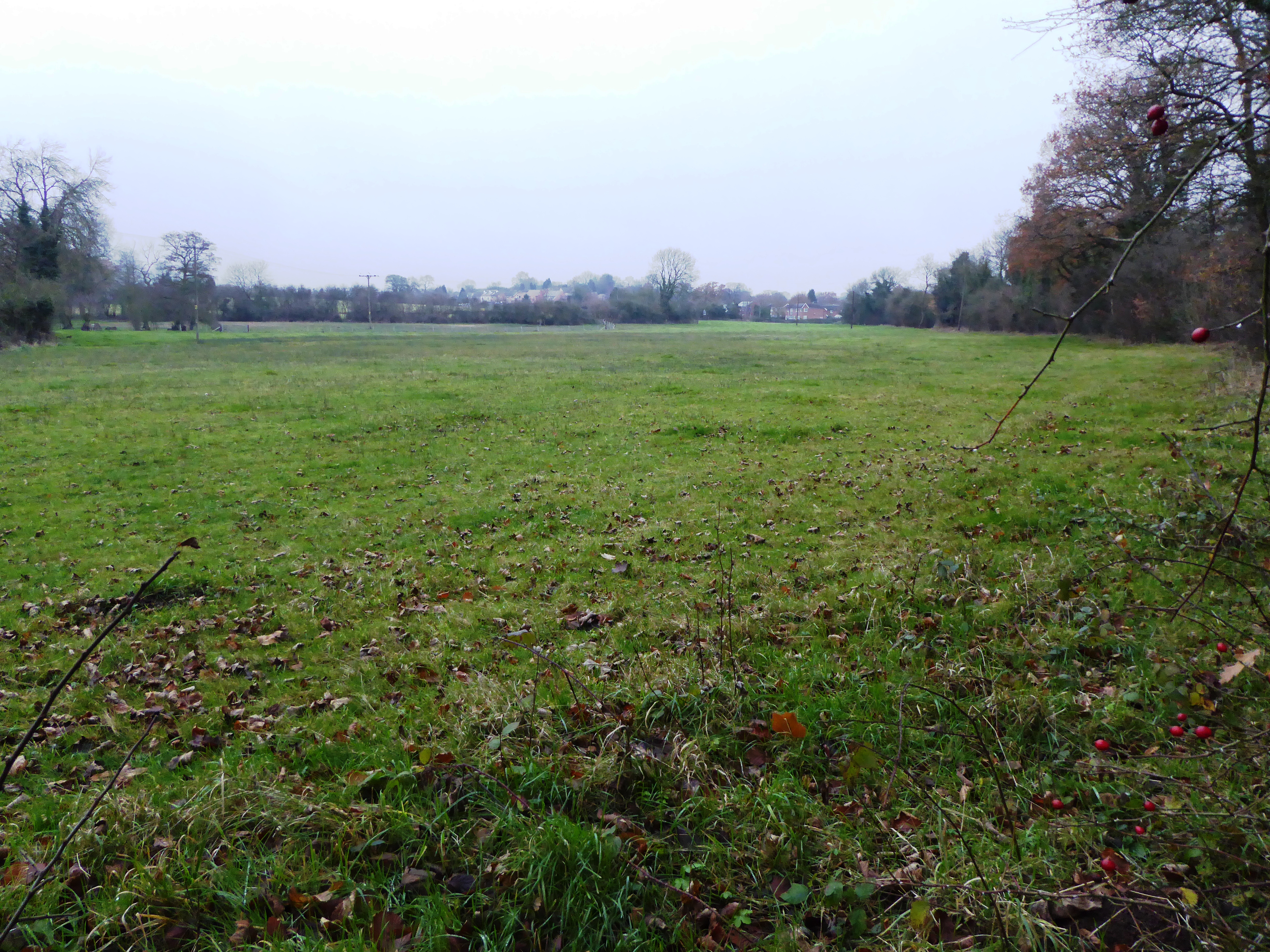
- Location of Botcheston Bog.
- Area of search: Leicestershire
- Grid reference: SK 485 046
- Interest: Biological
- Area: 2.9 hectares (7.2 acres)
- Notification date: 1983
- Location map: Magic Map

Botcheston Bog is a 2.9-hectare (7.2-acre) biological Site of Special Scientific Interest near Botcheston, west of Leicester.

This grazed marsh on peaty soil is dominated by carnation sedge, hard rush, creeping bent and meadowsweet. Other plants include several which are rare in the county.

The site is private land with no public access.
