= Desford =

Village in Leicestershire, England

Coordinates: 52.625°N 1.295°W

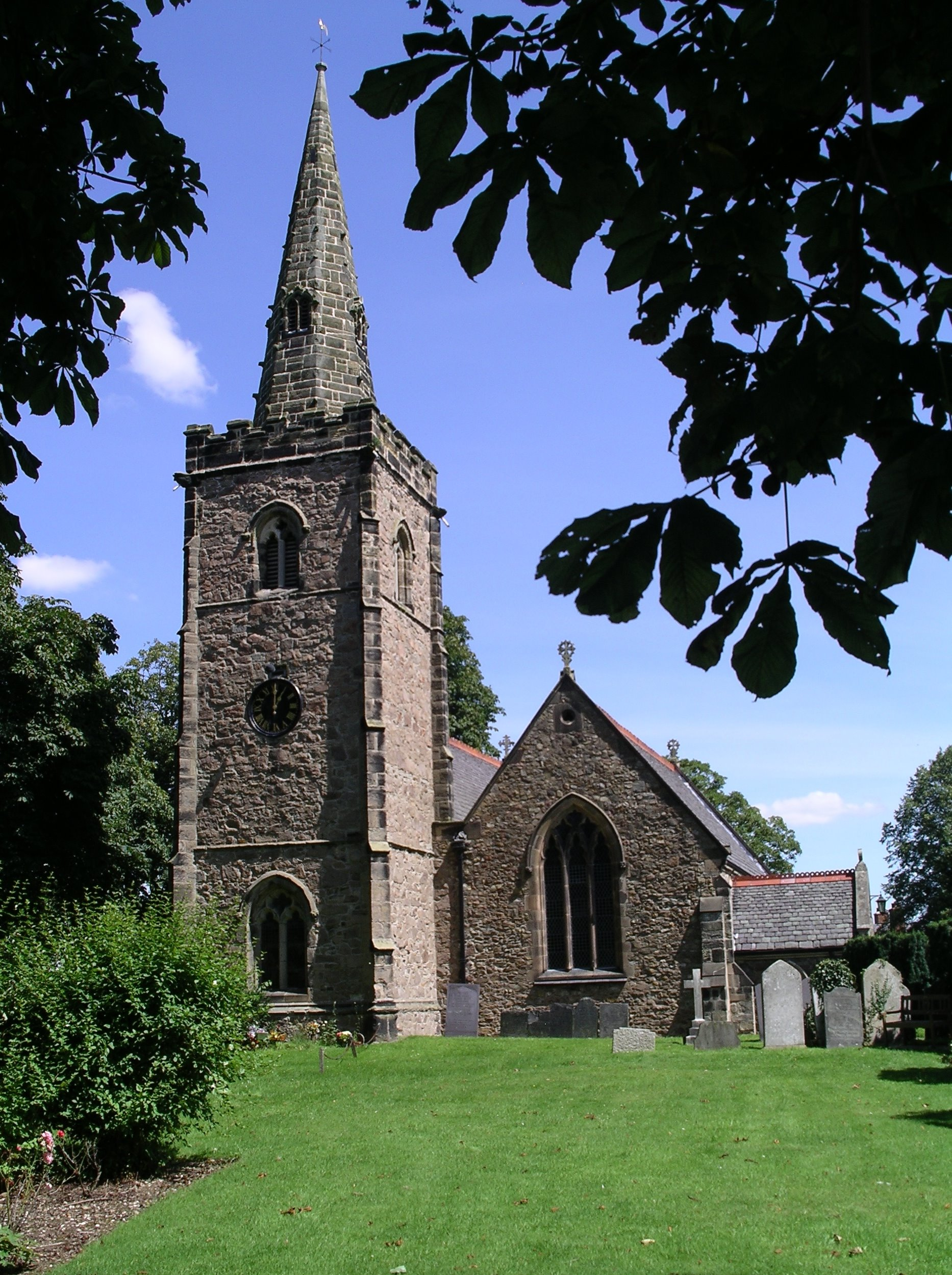
- St. Martin's parish church

- Location within Leicestershire
- Population: 3,676 (2001 census)
- OS grid reference: SK4703
- Civil parish: Desford
- District: Hinckley and Bosworth
- Shire county: Leicestershire
- Region: East Midlands
- Country: England
- Sovereign state: United Kingdom
- Post town: Leicester
- Postcode district: LE9
- Dialling code: 01455
- Police: Leicestershire
- Fire: Leicestershire
- Ambulance: East Midlands
- UK Parliament: Hinckley and Bosworth
- Website: Desford parish council

Desford is a village and civil parish in the Hinckley and Bosworth district of England, 7 miles (11 km) west of the centre of Leicester and around 7 miles north east of Hinckley. Situated on a hill approximately 400 feet above sea level, the parish includes the hamlets of Botcheston and Newtown Unthank and a scattered settlement at Lindridge. The population at the 2021 census had increased to 4,592. Desford is in the Doomsday Book of 1086 but the name itself is older than that meaning Deor's Ford suggesting an Anglo Saxon origin. Another suggestion is that it means 'ford frequented with wild animals'.

== Manors ==
At Lindridge about 1 mile (2 km) north of the town is a rectangular moat up to 13 yards (12 m) wide enclosing an area about 115 yards (105 m) by 127 yards (116 m). In the 19th century it was temporarily drained and six early 14th century pottery vessels were found. A building such as a manor house is likely to have stood on the island created by the moat. The moat is a scheduled monument.

In 1261, the manor of Desford was held by Simon de Montfort until he was killed at the Battle of Evesham in 1265. All his lands, which included Desford, were then given by Henry III to his own son, Edmund Crouchback, who was Earl of Lancaster until his death in 1297.

The Old Hall or Old Manor House in Desford High Street is a gable-roofed building with an irregular front of four bays, dating from about 1600 or a few years thereafter. It is built of brick in English bond with stone quoins and has a timber frame. The house has a two-storeyed porch whose upper storey is jettied. Attached to the house is an early 18th-century service wing built of brick in Flemish bond. The Manor House and its attached buildings are Grade II* listed buildings.

== Churches ==
The Church of England parish church of Saint Martin has a Norman font but the present building appears to be late 13th century. The chancel includes two lancet windows. There is a south aisle with an arcade that seems to be late 13th century. The west tower and spire are Perpendicular Gothic and therefore later: a window in the tower west wall is 14th century. The architect Stockdale Harrison of Leicester restored St. Martin's in 1884. The tower has a ring of six bells, all cast by John Taylor & Co of Loughborough in 1912. St. Martin's is a Grade II* listed building. The first rector of St Martin’s was recorded in 1246 as Brian de Walton. It is believed a rood-screen once stretched across the chancel arch and above the screen was an image of Christ impaled on the cross.

St. Martin's parish is part of a united benefice with St. Mary Magdalene, Peckleton.

Desford has a free church, built in 1866 at the top of Chapel lane, which is a member of the Baptist Union of Great Britain.

In 1790, the little chapel of the Strict Baptists was built in the High Street but only the graveyard with a few stones remains.

== Economic history ==
Until the 1700s most of the residents were engaged in agriculture farming arable strips in four open fields in the parish and pasturing their animals on the low lying meadows by the streams.

Desford's common lands 1000 acres of open fields were enclosed by Act of Parliament in 1759 . Prior to the Industrial Revolution the cottage industry of stocking or framework knitting developed in the village, the first reference being in 1704. This continued well in to the 19th century, with over a hundred framework knitters being recorded in the 1851 Census.

The 19th century was a time when coal mining became a large scale industry in west Leicestershire. In 1875 an unsuccessful attempt was made to sink a coalmine in the parish, at Lindridge. This failed due to constant flooding. In the present century the nearest coal mine, Desford Pit, only two miles away, employed many Desford people until it closed in 1984. To commemorate the pit’s closure a half winding wheel was erected in Lindridge Lane by the Desford History Society.

The Leicester and Swannington Railway was built through the parish in 1832 initially to haul coal from the coalfields to Leicester. It passes within 0.6 miles (1 km) of the town and Desford railway station was built at Newtown Unthank to serve the parish. The Midland Railway took over the line in 1845 and had extended it to Burton-upon-Trent by 1848. British Railways withdrew passenger services in 1964 and today the Leicester to Burton-upon-Trent Line carries only goods traffic. The larger houses in Station Road were built for middle-class commuters to Leicester.

Caterpillar Inc. is now a significant employer in the parish.

== Public houses ==
Over the years Desford has possessed a number of inns and pubs including The Blacksmiths Arms, The Blue Bell, The Bulls Head, The Red Lion, The Lancaster, The Roebuck, The Wheel and the White Horse. Of these the only ones surviving as public houses are the Lancaster near to the site of the old station and the Blue Bell Inn in the centre of the village. The building of the Roebuck can still be seen but is now a private residence. The Red Lion was redeveloped as part of a small exclusive development - there is a plaque on the wall commemorating the site of the former Red Lion Inn. The White Horse Inn is now a branch of the popular Italian tapas chain "Pesto".

== Aerodrome ==
South of the town, Reid and Sigrist had created Desford Aerodrome on Carts Field plus land in the adjoining Peckleton parish, it is mentioned in "The Bystander" in 1929. By 1936. It was a flying training school, with George E. Lowdell as its Chief flying Instructor. The majority of aeroplanes used were De Havilland Tiger Moth single engined biplanes. An early form of flight simulator was also used and was visible from the public road. Leicester Aero Club used the aerodrome until it moved to nearby Ratcliffe Aerodrome. Early in 1939 Lowdell flew the first flight of the New Malden-built Reid and Sigrist R.S.1 Snargasher from Desford. During World War Two the aerodrome was an RAF training centre.

Post 1945 RAF No 1969 AOP Flight was stationed here. Reid and Segrist developed the R.S.3 Desford as a trainer aircraft for use after the war.

The aerodrome has been redeveloped as an industrial site where Caterpillar Inc. has a large factory. The officers mess was located on what is now the Sport in Desford site.

== Amenities ==
The parish has three public houses, two in Desford: the Blue Bell, Lancaster Arms and the Greyhound in Botcheston.

Desford has a community primary school and a secondary school, Bosworth Academy.

Desford has an Italian restaurant (Pesto, previously the White Horse), a public library and a sports club. Tropical Birdland, a visitor attraction exhibiting many bird species, is situated in Lindridge Lane in Desford.

There are two Co-Operative Society shops, an independent store which is now also the post office as well as a Fish and Chip takeaway and an Indian takeaway, Little India. Until the Summer of 2025, there was a take away and eat in café called the "Food Room" situated in the centre of the village in one of the oldest buildings. The building was transformed into a large grocery store in late 2025.

Sport in Desford was set up as an independent organisation by Desford Parish Council (DPC) in 1988 and it became a Registered Charity (No.: 1100319) in 2003. DPC acquired the 5 acre plot on Peckleton Lane from Caterpillar UK in 1988 and SiD has developed what was a derelict site ever since, including the building of the double storey clubhouse, the new Scout Hall (funded by DPC) and the extra tennis court.

The Parish Council maintain the following open spaces in the parish:

=== The Pickard Recreation Area ===
- This open space was given to the village by Councillor Pickard in the early 1900s for the use of young children. Consequently appropriate play equipment has been installed there.
- There is also a pleasant grass area surrounded by trees and spring bulb planting
- Some seating is provided

=== The Kirkby Road Recreation Area ===
- This is a large grassed area near the Primary School which has space for Changing Rooms and 2 full size football pitches
- Play equipment is for younger and older children
- Some seating is provided

== Sources and further reading ==
- Hoskins, W.G. (1972) [1950]. The Heritage of Leicestershire. Leicester: City of Leicester Publicity Department. p. 16.
- Pevsner, Nikolaus (1960). Leicestershire and Rutland. The Buildings of England. Harmondsworth: Penguin Books. pp. 94–95.
