= Botcheston =

Hamlet in Leicestershire, England

Coordinates: 52.640°N 01.289°W

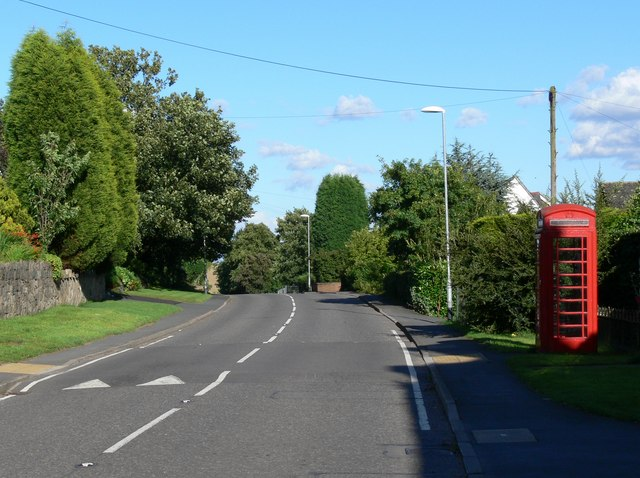
- Main Street

- Location within Leicestershire
- OS grid reference: SK4804
- Civil parish: Desford
- District: Hinckley and Bosworth
- Shire county: Leicestershire
- Region: East Midlands
- Country: England
- Sovereign state: United Kingdom
- Post town: Leicester
- Postcode district: LE9
- Dialling code: 01455
- Police: Leicestershire
- Fire: Leicestershire
- Ambulance: East Midlands
- UK Parliament: Hinckley and Bosworth
- Website: Desford parish council

Botcheston is a hamlet in the Hinckley and Bosworth district of Leicestershire about 6.5 miles (10.5 km) west of Leicester. It is in the civil parish of Desford and about a mile north of the village. The population is included in the civil parish of Desford. Botcheston's only Grade II* listed building is the War Memorial North of Polebrook House commemorating 36 attendees of the hamlet's former Industrial School for Boys who gave their lives during World War One, which now functions as a residential home.

Records of Botcheston date back to 1846, when it was regarded as a 37-person hamlet. The hamlet's history can be further dated back to 1575, albeit as footnote. Botcheston has about 200 households, a public house dating back to 1863 and a village hall. The Greyhound is credited with being a venue for numerous up-and-coming Leicestershire-based bands over the years, and has seen Kasabian, Perfume and The Young Knives perform.

Included amongst Botcheston's other amenities are the Botcheston Bog a noted Site of Special Scientific Interest, Botcheston Wicksteed Park Stadium a leisure park frequently used by local amateur football teams, and Forest Hill Golf Course on the backdrop of the National Forest.
