= O'Neill Pea Pod =

American homebuilt airplane

- Rear quarter view of the O'Neill Pea Pod aircraft

General information
- Type: Homebuilt aircraft
- National origin: United States
- Manufacturer: Terrence O'Neill
- Number built: 1

History
- Introduction date: 1962

The O'Neill Pea Pod was a 1960s American homebuilt aircraft of unusual design. It did not fly.

== Design and development ==
Designed and built by Terrence O'Neill of Fort Wayne, Indiana, the Pea Pod was deemed by him to be "a functional approach to building a portable plane." It's notable for its small size and for the pilot being in a prone position.

The Pea Pod was a shoulder-wing monoplane, of canard configuration. The pilot lay on top of a padded support, underneath a fully transparent canopy. The pilot could control the aircraft using a hand control stick and foot pedals. The fuselage, wings, and tail were made using a sandwich construction with a solid styrofoam core that was skinned using expoxy-coated plywood. The engine was encased within the vertical tail and drove a two bladed pusher propeller. Construction took 14 months and cost $800.00.

== Operational history ==
The aircraft, with the serial number PP-1, was given the FAA Registration of N10T in August 1961, with that expiring in August 1970. The Pea Pod debuted at the 1962 EAA Fly-In Convention at Greater Rockford Airport, Illinois.

In 1963, it was reported that the Pea Pod was undergoing design changes, and contemporary photographs show the aircraft with the central tail removed, the engine repositioned to the rear of the fuselage and driving a two-bladed pusher propeller. Two vertical fins, equipped with outboard-acting flaps, were fitted to the wingtips. There are no reports of it ever having flown.

== Specifications ==
Front quarter view of the O'Neill Pea Pod

Data from Air Progress

General characteristics

- Crew: 1
- Length: 9 ft 0 in (2.74 m)
- Wingspan: 8 ft 0 in (2.44 m)
- Height: 4 ft 0 in (1.22 m)
- Empty weight: 200 lb (91 kg)
- Gross weight: 420 lb (191 kg)
- Powerplant: 1 × Kiekhaefer O-45-35 flat twin, 35 hp (26 kW)

Performance

- Maximum speed: 132 mph (212 km/h, 115 kn)
- Cruise speed: 115 mph (185 km/h, 100 kn)
- Landing speed: 55 mph (89 km/h; 48 kn)
- Range: 350 mi (560 km, 300 nmi)
- Rate of climb: 1,080 ft/min (5.5 m/s)

== See also ==
Aircraft of comparable role, configuration, and era

- Farrar V-1 Flying Wing
- Lamson PL-1 Quark
- Miller M-5 Belly Flopper
- Rutan VariEze
- Ultra-Efficient Products Penetrater
