= Tropical Birdland, Desford =

Tropical Birdland

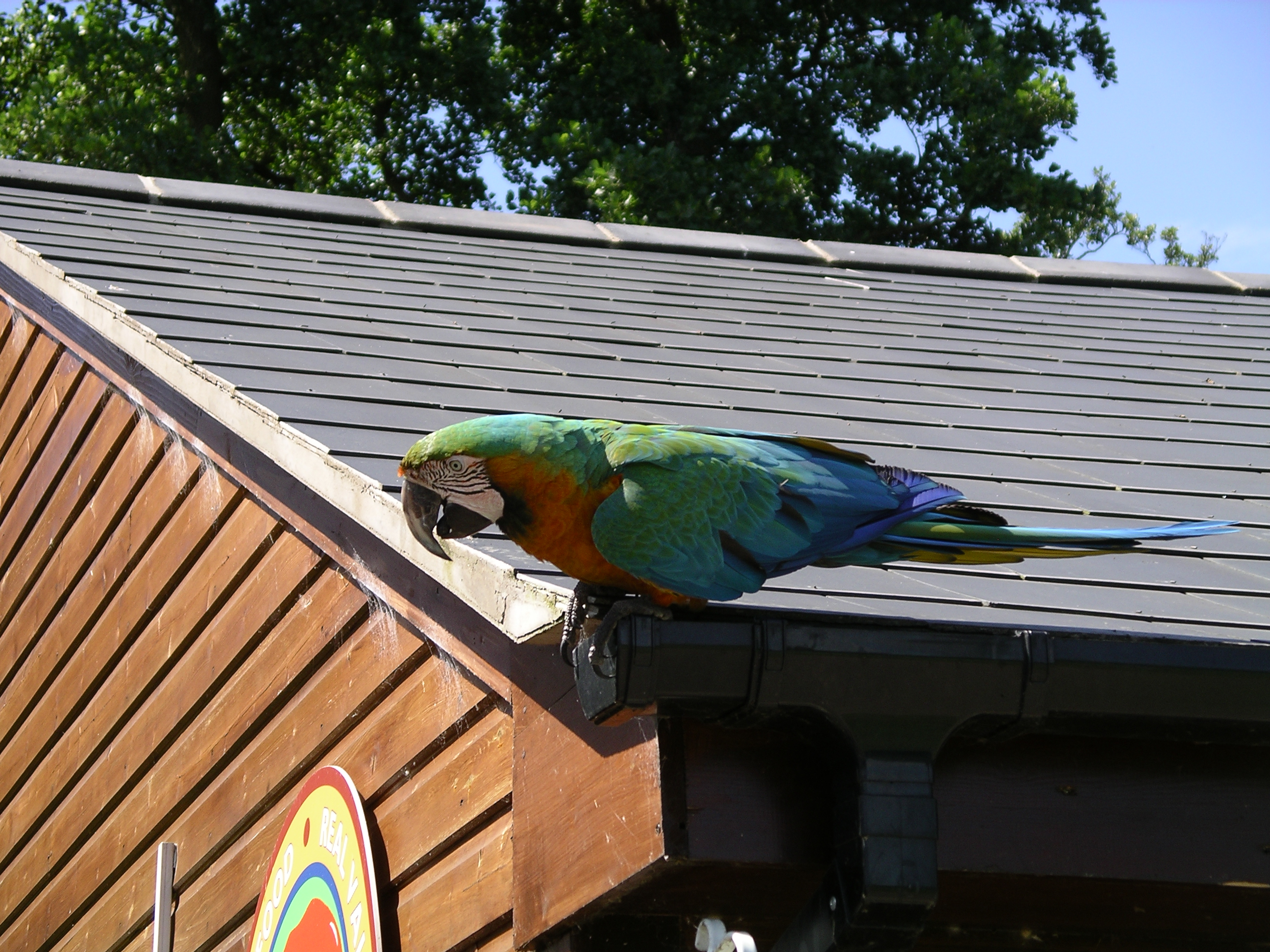
- A free-flying macaw on a roof at Tropical Birdland, Leicestershire. It is a Harlequin Macaw (Greenwing/Blue and Gold hybrid)
- Interactive map of Tropical Birdland
- 52°37′54″N 1°17′49″W
- Date opened: 1984
- Location: Lindridge Lane, Desford LE9 9GN, United Kingdom
- Website: Tropical Birdland

Tropical Birdland in the north of the village of Desford, Leicestershire, England, is a visitor attraction that has many bird species including parrots, hornbills and owls on display. Some of the birds are allowed to fly out-of-doors during visiting hours.
