= Reid and Sigrist R.S.1 Snargasher =

R.S.1 Snargasher
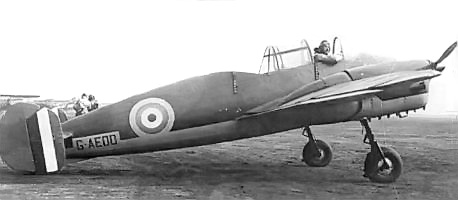
- Reid and Sigrist RS1 c. 1939

General information
- Type: Trainer
- Manufacturer: Reid and Sigrist
- Designer: W/Cdr George Lowdell
- Status: Cancelled
- Primary user: Royal Air Force (intended)
- Number built: 1

History
- Introduction date: 1939
- First flight: early 1939
- Variant: Reid and Sigrist R.S.3/4

The Reid and Sigrist R.S.1 Snargasher was a British twin-engined, three-seat advanced trainer developed in the Second World War.

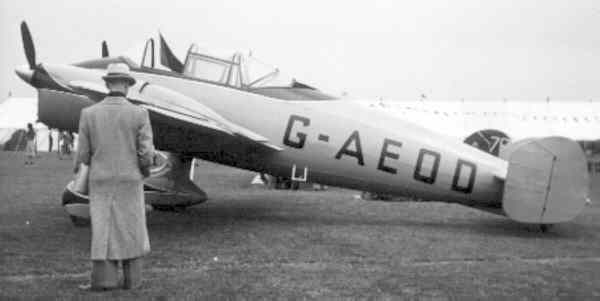
The prototype R.S.1 in its original colour scheme, c. 1939

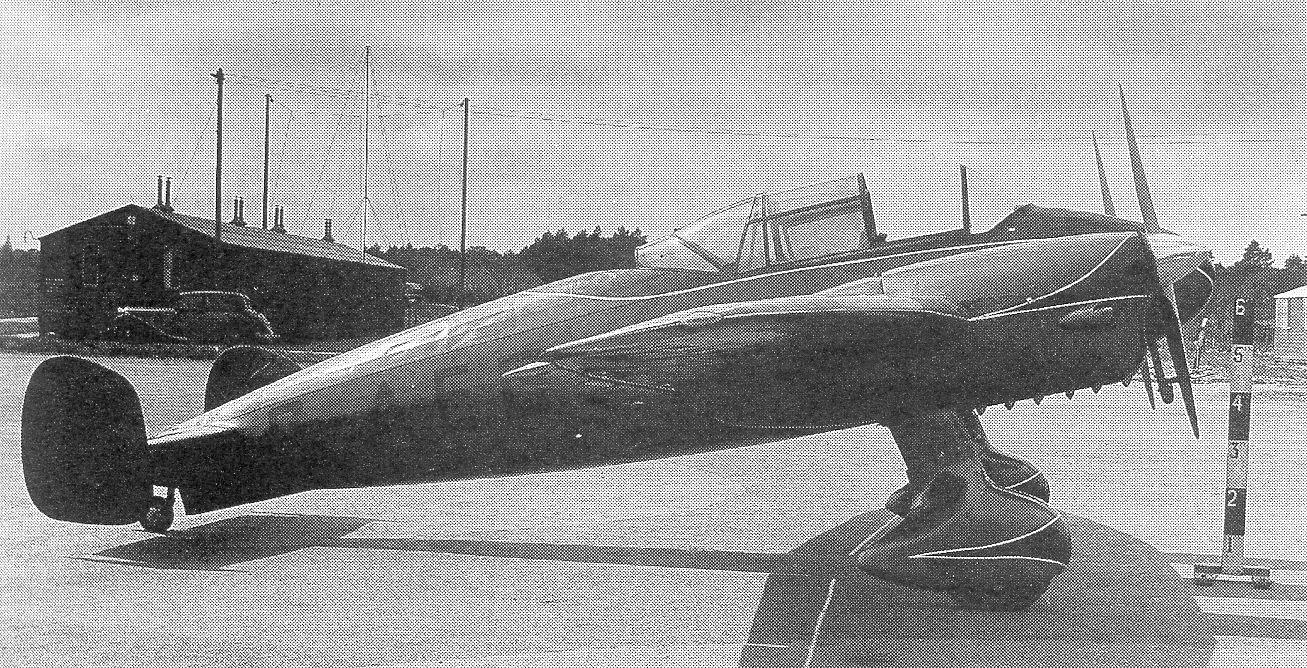
G-AEOD in May 1939

== Design and development ==
Reid and Sigrist in Desford, Leicester, United Kingdom, were an important instrument manufacturer in the interwar era, specialising in aircraft applications leading to the forming of an aviation division in 1937 at New Malden, Surrey factory site. The first product was a unique twin-engined advanced trainer powered by a pair of de Havilland Gipsy Six II (205 hp, 152 kW) engines. Although basically a conventional mid-wing "taildragger" design with mainly wooden construction (the tail surfaces were fabric covered), the fuselage/wing surfaces had plywood covering, and the cockpit featured a sliding canopy for the three-seat configuration, that was in vogue at the time for training. An alternate light bomber configuration was also proposed with a pilot and radio operator/navigator in the front compartment and a rear-facing gunner position behind equipped with a single machine gun.

== Operational history ==
The prototype, registered as G-AEOD on 9 October 1936, had its first flight early in 1939 with Reid and Sigrist test pilot George E. Lowdell at the controls. The R.S.1 named whimsically "Snargasher" by the factory workers during its construction (the name which was eventually formally adapted had no meaning other than as a "family joke") made its first public appearance at the Heathrow Garden Party of the Royal Aeronautical Society on 15 May 1939 with its Certificate of Airworthiness issued on 3 June 1939.

Further development of the type was suspended as the company became a wartime engineering and production concern with Bolton-Paul Defiant and Hawker Hurricane assembly and repair contracts. The R.S.1 was used as a communications aircraft by Reid and Sigrist, retaining its civil registration but flying in green/brown camouflage until the sole prototype was broken up in 1944. By that point, a more definitive development had been started, the R.S.3 "Desford" which was intended for postwar use.

== Specifications (R.S.1) ==
Data from British civil aircraft, 1919-1972 Volume III

General characteristics

- Crew: 1
- Capacity: 2
- Length: 25 ft 4 in (7.72 m)
- Wingspan: 36 ft 4 in (11.07 m)
- Height: 8 ft 11 in (2.72 m)
- Wing area: 212 sq ft (19.7 m^{2})
- Empty weight: 3,000 lb (1,361 kg)
- Gross weight: 4,900 lb (2,223 kg)
- Powerplant: 2 × de Havilland Gipsy Six II Series II 6-cylinder air-cooled inverted in-line piston engines, 205 hp (153 kW) each
- Propellers: 2-bladed variable-pitch propellers

Performance

- Maximum speed: 205 mph (330 km/h, 178 kn) at sea level
- Cruise speed: 190 mph (310 km/h, 170 kn) at 6,000 ft (1,829 m)
- Range: 800 mi (1,300 km, 700 nmi)
- Service ceiling: 18,000 ft (5,500 m)
- Rate of climb: 1,330 ft/min (6.8 m/s)
