= Akaflieg Berlin B9 =

1940s German experimental aircraft

Akaflieg Berlin B 9

General information
- Type: Experimental aircraft
- National origin: Germany
- Manufacturer: Akaflieg Berlin
- Status: Prototype only
- Number built: 1

History
- First flight: 1943

The Akaflieg Berlin B 9 was a twin-engined experimental aircraft, developed by Akaflieg Berlin and Flugtechnische Fachgruppe in the 1940s. It was designed to examine the benefits of having a pilot in a prone position. The aircraft was flown in 1943, but was eventually abandoned.

== Specifications ==
Data from Letadla 39–45: F.F.G. Berlin B 9

General characteristics

- Crew: One
- Length: 9.06 m (29 ft 9 in)
- Wingspan: 9.40 m (30 ft 10 in)
- Height: 2.32 m (7 ft 7 in)
- Wing area: 11.90 m^{2} (128.1 sq ft)
- Empty weight: 940 kg (2,072 lb)
- Gross weight: 1,115 kg (2,458 lb)
- Powerplant: 2 × Hirth HM 500 4-cylinder air-cooled inverted in-line piston engine, 77 kW (103 hp) each

Performance

- Maximum speed: 250 km/h (160 mph, 130 kn)
- Cruise speed: 225 km/h (140 mph, 121 kn)
- Range: 400 km (250 mi, 220 nmi)
- Service ceiling: 4,000 m (13,000 ft)
- Time to altitude: 4.2 min to 1,000 m (3,300 ft)

== See also ==
Aircraft of comparable role, configuration, and era

- Gloster Meteor F8 "Prone Pilot"
- Henschel Hs 132
- Ikarus 451
- Reid and Sigrist R.S.3

Related lists

- List of aircraft of World War II
