= Reid and Sigrist =

English company

Reid and Sigrist was an English engineering company based at New Malden in Surrey. It later acquired sites at Desford and Braunstone in Leicestershire. Initially it developed and manufactured aircraft instrumentation and pilot selection aids but later diversified into flying training and aircraft design. During World War II the company was part of the Civilian Repair Organisation repairing, rebuilding and converting warplanes at the Desford site. Post-war, it continued to manufacture aviation instruments and guidance systems but also diversified further to produce cameras and optical instruments. In 1954, the company was purchased and taken over by the Decca Record Company.

== History ==
Reid and Sigrist Ltd was formed in February 1928 as a private company with £4000 capital (~£258,000 or US$357,500 in 2021 terms). The company was set up by Squadron-Leader (ret.) George Hancock Reid DFC and Frederick Sigrist, a joint managing director of H.G. Hawker Engineering Ltd (which later became Hawker Siddeley Aircraft Ltd). The new company acquired the rights to the designs of Reid's previous company, Reid Manufacturing & Construction Company Ltd, which had designed and made precision aircraft instrumentation, most notably an aircraft turn and slip indicator that Reid had invented and developed, and a pilot testing apparatus.

The company was initially located at The Athanaeum Works, The Vale, in Hampstead, North London, before moving to Canbury Park Road, Kingston-upon-Thames, Surrey, and, finally, in 1935, relocating to a new, purpose-built factory at Shannon Corner, Kingston-by-Pass, New Malden, Surrey. As the company expanded and diversified further sites were acquired at Desford Aerodrome and Braunstone in Leicestershire. The company ceased to exist as a separate entity when it was bought by the Decca Record Company at the end of 1954.

== Aircraft instruments ==
Initially, the main business focus for the company was the development and manufacture of aircraft instrumentation. An important product was a type of gyroscopic turn and slip indicator invented and developed by George Reid. A later version of this device was incorporated into the standard blind-flying panel adopted by the Royal Air Force (RAF) in 1937. A further development was the Gyorizon which combined the functions of a turn indicator and artificial horizon in one instrument. The design and manufacture of gyroscopic instrumentation and guidance systems continued after World War II and Reid and Sigrist 3-axis gyroscopes were used in the, RAE designed, guidance system for the Black Knight rocket.

As well as flying instrumentation, the company also developed a pilot selection tool. The Reid Reaction Apparatus was a device which recorded the reaction times of trainee pilots when centralizing a set of controls in a mock-up cockpit. Depending upon the results, trainees were then graded as good, average, or inferior. This device was in use during the 1930s at some RAF flying schools.

== Flying training ==
In 1935, Reid and Sigrist successfully applied to run one of the new Civilian Flying Training Schools, being created as part of the RAF Expansion Scheme to train new service pilots. At the time, the company did not possess an airfield, so a rapid countrywide search for a suitable site was undertaken, which identified Desford Aerodrome as a potential location. Rapid negotiations enabled the company to purchase the airfield and also some surrounding farmland. Development of the aerodrome was carried out by En-Tout-Cas Ltd, of Syston, whilst new building work was undertaken by Fairby Construction Company Ltd. A mere three months later, on 13 December 1935, the new Flying Training School was officially opened by the Minister of State for Air, Viscount Swinton of Masham. The aircraft chosen for use at the school was the De Havilland D.H. 82A Tiger Moth, of which there were initially 17, later increased to 21.

In 1937, the school was expanded to accommodate training of RAF Volunteer Reserve (RAFVR) pilots and was renamed No. 7 Elementary and Reserve Flying Training School (E&RFTS). A year later, activities increased even further with the establishment of No. 3 Civilian Air Navigation School (CANS) at Desford. With the declaration of war in September 1939, these training units were placed on a war footing under RAF control, and all reserves were mobilised. This was reflected in a change of titles to No. 7 Elementary Training Flying School (EFTS) and No. 3 Air Observation Navigation School (AONS), respectively.

In 1938, Reid and Sigrist was awarded an additional contract to operate No. 21 EFTS at Stapleford Aerodrome in Essex as well as No. 28 E&RFTS at Meir Aerodrome (Stoke-on-Trent). No.21 E&RFTS was formed on 1 January 1938, while No. 28 E&RFTS was established on 1 August 1938. Both schools were disbanded on 3 September 1939.

== Aircraft design ==
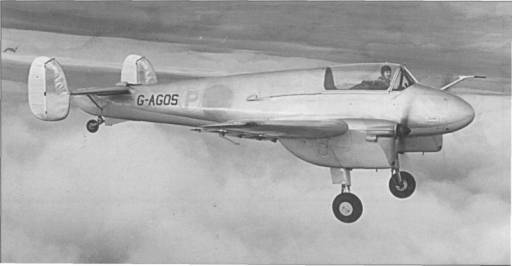
R.S.3 Desford

In 1937, the company formed an aviation division at the New Malden, Surrey, factory site. The first design was for a twin-engined advanced training aircraft, the R.S.1 "Snargasher", which first flew from Desford in 1939. However, no production orders were forthcoming, so the R.S.1 was eventually relegated to communication duties for the company, based at Desford.

The only other company design to fly was the R.S.3 'Desford'. A similar but more refined design to the R.S.1, it first flew in July 1945 at Desford. Like its predecessor, the R.S.3 did not attract a production order. However, the sole prototype did receive a new lease of life in 1949 when it was purchased by the Air Council for experiments investigating the prone position pilot concept. After conversion for the experimental work, it was given the company designation R.S.4 and named 'Bobsleigh'.

- R.S.1 Snargasher
- R.S.3 Desford

== Aircraft repair ==
During World War II, Reid and Sigrist was one of the companies incorporated into the Civilian Repair Organisation set up by the British Air Ministry to coordinate the repair of damaged RAF aircraft. This work was carried out at the Desford site. The initial contract covered the repair of the Boulton Paul Defiant two-seat turret fighter, with the first airframe being delivered to Desford in January 1940. This was later followed by an additional contract to convert the obsolete Defiants into the TT target towing version of the aircraft.

Reid and Sigrist also undertook repairs of RAF Bell P-39 Airacobra fighters and also signed contracts to repair and convert North American B-25 Mitchell bombers. Work on Defiant airframes finished in June 1945, and the last Mitchells left Desford in November the same year.

== Cameras ==
After the Second World War, the company was requested by the British government to produce the Reid camera based on the Leica patents and drawings which had been seized by the Allies. The first camera went on general sale in 1951, and the company produced cameras until 1964.

- Reid III – based on the Leica III series, with production of about 1,600 cameras from 1951.
- Reid I – a simplified version and similar to the Leica E; it was on sale from 1958, with a production run of about 500, mainly to the British military.
- Reid II – a proposed model announced in 1959, which was ostensibly a Reid III with faster speed.
