= Reid and Sigrist R.S.3 Desford =

R.S.3 Desford/R.S.4 Bobsleigh
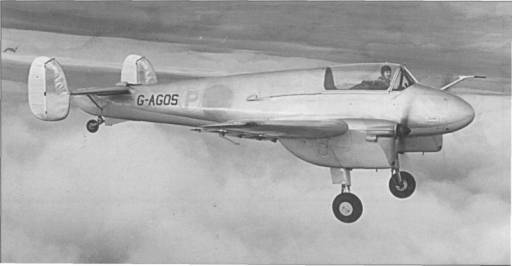
- Reid and Sigrist R.S.3 c. 1945

General information
- Type: Trainer
- Manufacturer: Reid and Sigrist
- Designer: Charles Bower
- Status: Cancelled
- Primary user: Royal Air Force (intended)
- Number built: 1

History
- Introduction date: 1945
- First flight: 9 July 1945
- Developed from: Reid and Sigrist R.S.1

The Reid and Sigrist R.S.3 Desford is a British twin-engined, propeller-driven, three-seat advanced trainer aircraft developed in the Second World War for postwar use. Although the R.S.3 was evaluated as a trainer, the type never entered production and was eventually rebuilt as the R.S.4 Bobsleigh as an experimental aircraft with the pilot in a prone position, seen as advantageous in minimising g-force effects in fighter aircraft.

== Design and development ==
Reid and Sigrist in Desford, Leicestershire, England, were an important instrument manufacturer in the interwar era, specialising in aircraft applications leading to the forming of an aviation division in 1937 at the New Malden, Surrey factory site. The first product was a twin-engined advanced trainer, the R.S.1 Snargasher (1939) which was eventually relegated to company hack used primarily at the factory and Desford aerodrome.

The follow-up design, the R.S.3 Desford (taking its name from the company site) was similar in size and concept to its predecessor although it was only configured for a pilot and trainee and featured a low-set wing. The R.S.3 was powered by two 130 hp de Havilland Gipsy Major Series I engines, rather than the higher powered de Havilland Gipsy Six engines of the earlier R.S.1.

== Operational history ==
The prototype, registered as G-AGOS first flew on 9 July 1945, shortly before VJ Day. Evaluated as a private venture project by test pilots including famed postwar flyer, Janusz Żurakowski at the Aeroplane and Armament Experimental Establishment (A&AEE) at RAF Boscombe Down, the R.S.3 was generally found to be well suited as a multi-engine primary and intermediate trainer. However, RAF interest was lukewarm due to the glut of surplus wartime training aircraft available. The prototype appeared at the Farnborough Airshow in 1946, and was allocated to the Institute of Aviation Medicine, but by May 1949, it was de-registered as a civilian aircraft, flying subsequently with RAF serial number VZ728.

Further development of the type continued as the company wanted to establish itself as an aviation engineering and production concern, although its postwar work primarily centred on instrument and camera production, especially in creating a copy of the German Leica.

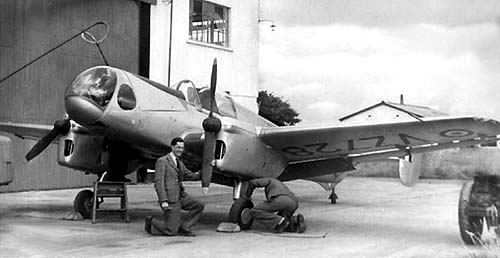
R.S.4 Bobsleigh c. 1951

When Royal Air Force high-speed research explored high g-forces encountered in manoeuvres, a number of prone-pilot experimental aircraft, including the Gloster Meteor F8 "Prone Pilot", were produced. To investigate low-speed applications, the R.S.4 Bobsleigh was a radical conversion of the R.S.3, reconfigured into a single pilot operation with a prone pilot station in the new rounded nose. This section had a transparent cone covering a large section of the nose and two separate transparent ports to give minimal sideways and rearward views. The R.S.4 was first flown in this form on 13 June 1951. Although useful data was obtained, the R.S.4's prone pilot did have difficulty with the initial control setup. Today's hang glider pilots have found the prone position an ideal means of controlling flight, as well as providing a streamlined profile.

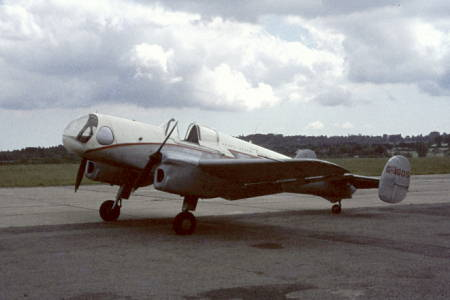
R.S.4 used by Film Aviation Services, c. 1964

Experimental testing was conducted by the Royal Aircraft Establishment (RAE) at Farnborough and continued until January 1956 when the R.S.4 returned to the UK civil registry, again as G-AGOS. It was part of the Christchurch Aero Club's fleet of aircraft 1960-63. It was also used as an air-photo aircraft by Film Aviation Services and remained in flyable condition until 1973. After a period at the Snibston Discovery Park, the R.S.4 was moved to Spanhoe, Northamptonshire for restoration by Windmill Aviation. The restored Desford flew again on 22 April 2018, but the aircraft's owners, Leicestershire County Council, did not publicly display the Desford. The Desford was delivered to the Newark Air Museum on 19 August 2022.

== Specifications (R.S.3 - Gipsy Major 30) ==
Data from Jane's all the World's Aircraft 1947

General characteristics

- Crew: 2
- Length: 25 ft 6 in (7.77 m) (26 ft 9 in (8.15 m) as R>S.4 Bobsleigh)
- Wingspan: 34 ft (10 m)
- Height: 8 ft 2 in (2.49 m)
- Wing area: 186 sq ft (17.3 m^{2})
- Max takeoff weight: 3,550 lb (1,610 kg)
- Fuel capacity: 44 imp gal (53 US gal; 200 L) fuel in two centre-section tanks; 4.6 imp gal (5.5 US gal; 21 L) oil
- Powerplant: 2 × de Havilland Gipsy Major 30 4-cyl. inverted in-line air-cooled piston engines, 160 hp (120 kW) each at 2,500 rpm for take-off
- Propellers: 2-bladed constant-speed airscrews

Performance

- Maximum speed: 181 mph (291 km/h, 157 kn) at sea level
- Cruise speed: 170 mph (270 km/h, 150 kn)
- Range: 523 mi (842 km, 454 nmi)
- Endurance: 4½ hours
- Service ceiling: 24,000 ft (7,300 m)
- Rate of climb: 1,416 ft/min (7.19 m/s)
- Wing loading: 19 lb/sq ft (93 kg/m^{2})
- Power/mass: 11 lb/hp (6.68 kg/kW)

== See also ==
Aircraft of comparable role, configuration, and era

- Aero Ae-45
- Akaflieg Berlin B9
- DFS 228
- Gloster Meteor F8 "Prone Pilot"
- Henschel Hs 132
- Ikarus 451
