= Miller M-5 Belly Flopper =

American homebuilt airplane

M-5 Belly Flopper

General information
- Type: Homebuilt aircraft
- National origin: United States
- Manufacturer: Ervin Miller
- Number built: 1

History
- First flight: 1946
- Fate: Crashed

The Miller M-5 Belly Flopper was a 1940s American homebuilt aircraft. Its most notable feature was that the pilot flew in the prone position.

== Design and development ==
It was designed and built by Ervin A. Miller of Milwaukee, Wisconsin during the 1940s. The aircraft was a single-seat, low-wing cantilever monoplane. The pilot lay prone within a fully enclosed fuselage, the front of which was fitted with a transparent dome. The aircraft was equipped with a pair of Continental A40 engines, which powered two two-bladed propellers. There was a fixed conventional undercarriage, and a cruciform tail. The aircraft was given the FAA registration of N29113.

== Operational history ==
The M-5 first flew in 1946. It was reported that the airplane had accrued 300 hours of flight time. Miller sold the aircraft, and the new owner destroyed it in a crash.

== Specifications ==
Rear quarter view of the Belly Flopper

Data from A Corner of Heaven

General characteristics

- Crew: 1
- Wingspan: 28 ft 4 in (8.63 m)
- Powerplant: 2 × Continental A40 four cylinder, air-cooled, 40 hp (30 kW) each

Performance

- Maximum speed: 150 mph (241 km/h, 130 kn)
- Cruise speed: 127 mph (205 km/h, 111 kn)

== See also ==
Aircraft of comparable role, configuration, and era

- Farrar V-1 Flying Wing
- Lamson PL-1 Quark
- O'Neill Pea Pod
- Ultra-Efficient Products Penetrater
