= Panzerblitz (missile) =

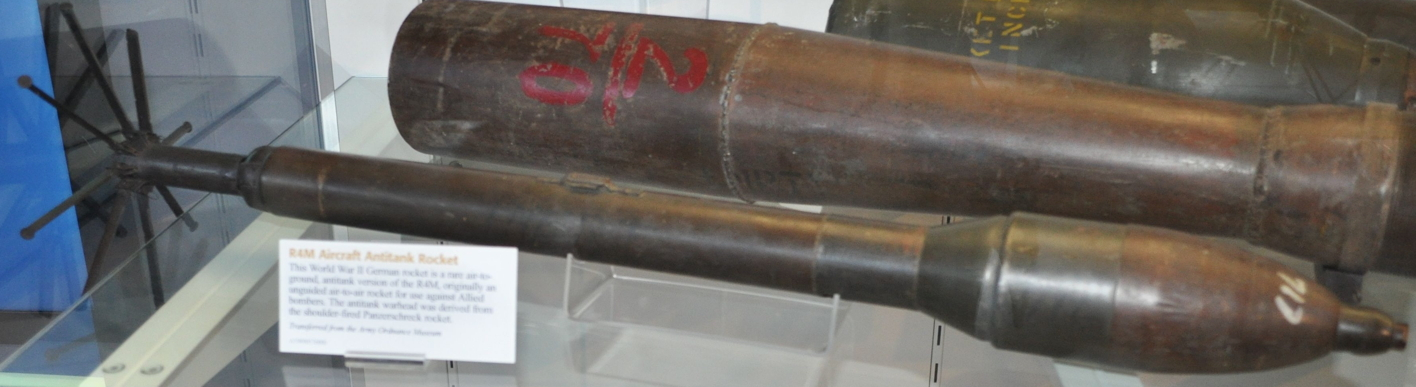
- A Panzerblitz II on display at the Steven F. Udvar-Hazy Center
- Type: Rocket
- Place of origin: Germany

Service history
- In service: 1945
- Used by: Luftwaffe
- Wars: World War II

Specifications
- Diameter: 80 mm in Panzerblitz I 88 mm in Panzerblitz II 55 mm in Panzerblitz III
- Muzzle velocity: 525 m/s (1,175 mph)
- Effective firing range: 600-1,000 m
- Maximum firing range: 1,500 m
- Filling weight: Unknown

Panzerblitz is a German anti-tank unguided aerial rocket developed during the Second World War.

The first variant of the missile Panzerblitz I was based on the 80 mm (3.1 in) M-8 rocket (which is a German clone of the Soviet RS-82 rocket) with a HEAT warhead, the second variant Panzerblitz II was based on the R4M Orkan air-to-air rocket used by the Messerschmitt Me 262. It was fitted with either an 88 mm (3.5 in)-diameter RPzGr 4992 HEAT warhead from the Panzerschreck, the third variant the panzerblitz III was essentially a 55 mm (2.2 in) R4/M but with a HEAT warhead.

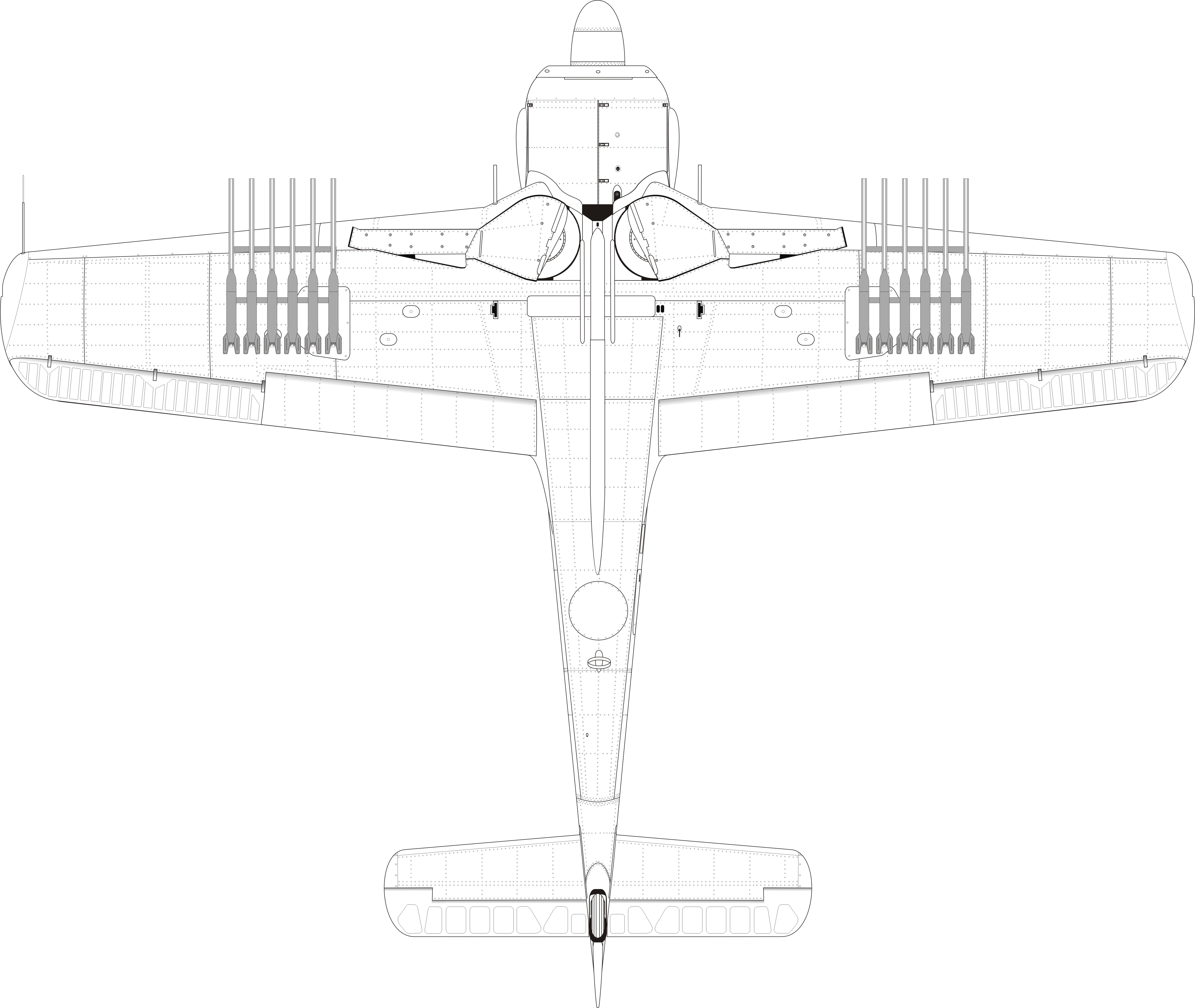
Fw 190 F-8 Unterseite Panzerblitz

It was intended to be operated by the Henschel Hs 132, which would carry up to eight rockets, complementing or even replacing the cannon armament in the tank-destroying role. The 80mm model was tested extensively in early 1945 from Focke-Wulf Fw 190s, but neither Panzerblitz II nor Panzerblitz III (earmarked exclusively for the Hs 132) were ready for use by the German surrender in May 1945.

however the panzerblitz I was used in action on both the western and eastern front by units such as III./SG 4 (all three Staffeln), 13.(Pz)/SG 151, 1.(Pz)/SG 9 (Pz.Blitz). II./SG 151, 3.(Pz)/SG 9, 3./SG 1, 9./SG 77 & 6./SG 1. planned to be followed by 3./SG 77, 3./SG 4, 3./SG 3 & 6./SG 4.

A Panzerblitz rocket pod was in development. It would have been for the Ar-234 C and each pod would have contained 20 Panzerblitz rockets.

== Specifications ==
==== General characteristics ====
- Type: Unguided rocket, anti-tank warhead
- Length:
- Diameter:
- Dry weight:

==== Components ====
- Compressor:

==== Performance ====
- Maximum power output:

== Sources ==
- Green, William. Warplanes of the Third Reich. London: Macdonald and Jane's Publishers Ltd., 1970 (fourth impression 1979). ISBN 0-356-02382-6.
- Smith, J.Richard and Kay, Anthony. German Aircraft of the Second World War. London: Putnam & Company Ltd., 1972 (third impression 1978). ISBN 0-370-00024-2.
- Wood, Tony and Gunston, Bill. Hitler's Luftwaffe: A pictorial history and technical encyclopedia of Hitler's air power in World War II. London: Salamander Books Ltd., 1977. ISBN 0-86101-005-1.
