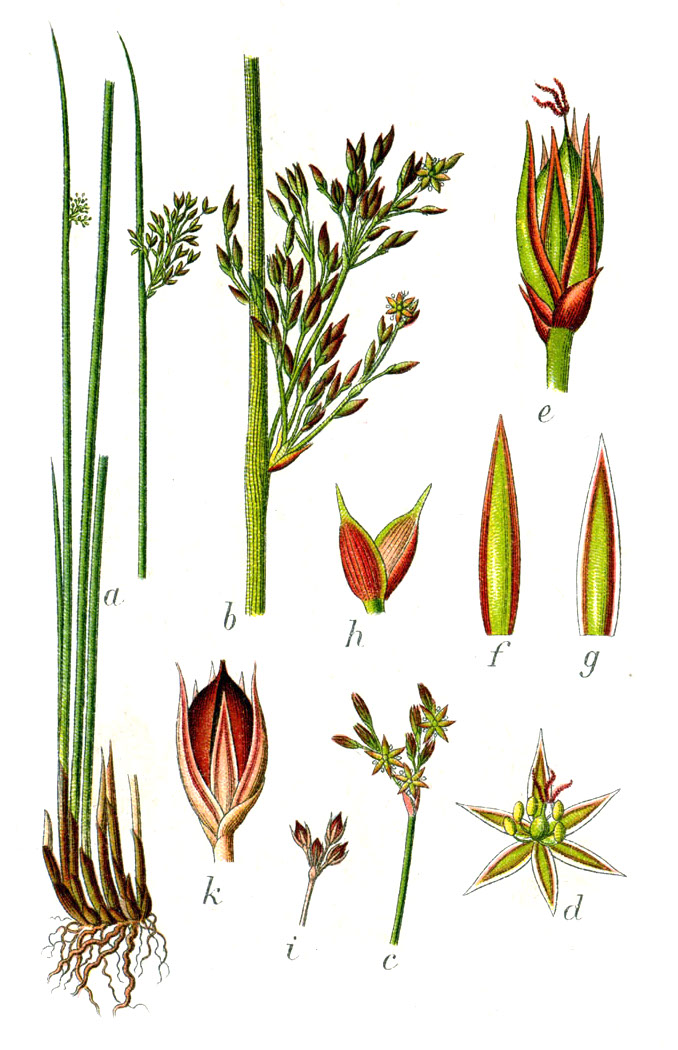
- Botanical illustration
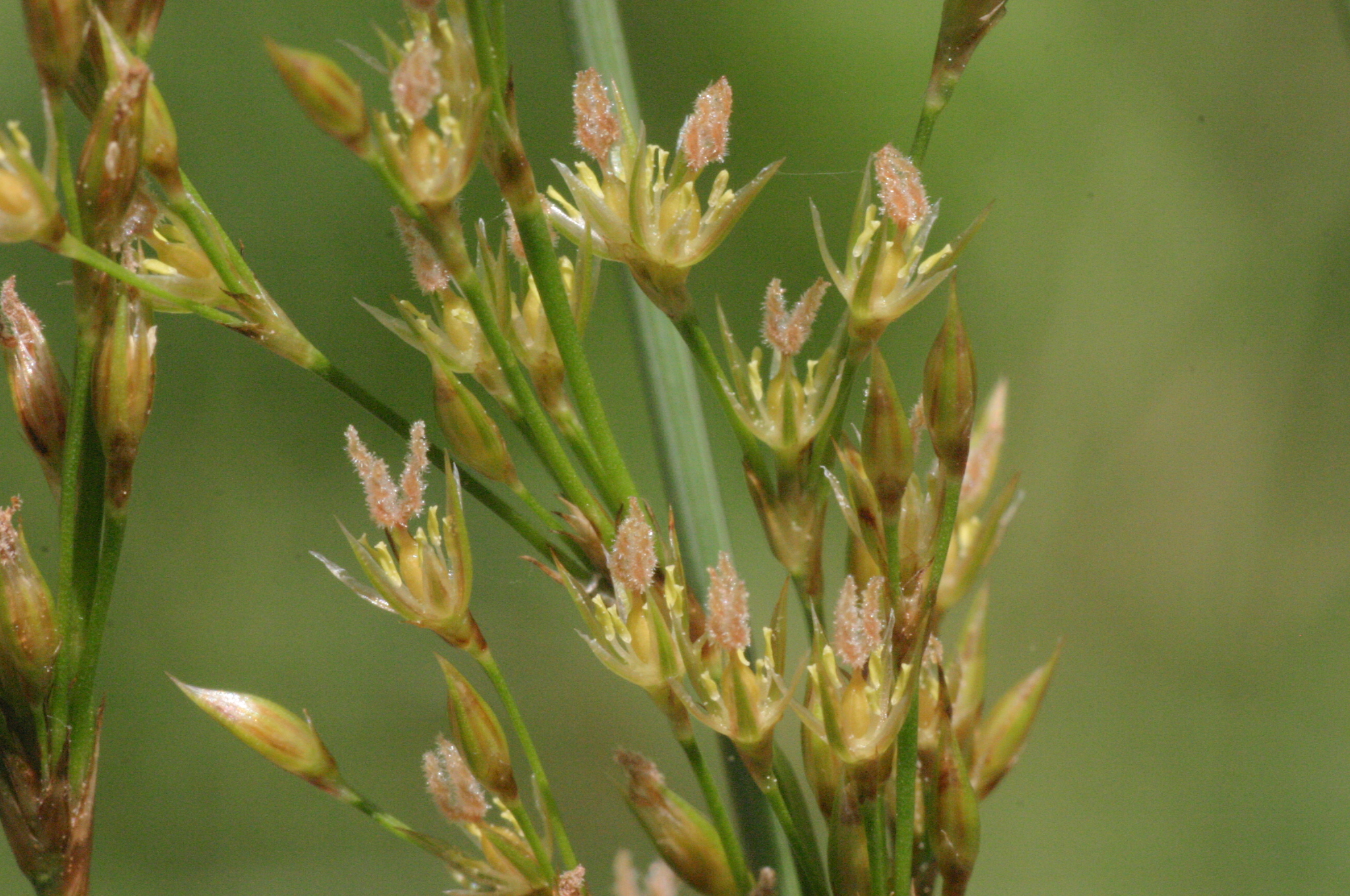
- Inflorescences

Scientific classification
- Kingdom: Plantae
- Clade: Tracheophytes
- Clade: Angiosperms
- Clade: Monocots
- Clade: Commelinids
- Order: Poales
- Family: Juncaceae
- Genus: Juncus
- Species: J. inflexus

Binomial name
- Juncus inflexus L.

Synonyms
- List: Juncus acutissimus (Buchenau) Adamson; Juncus angelisii Ten.; Juncus brachytepalus Trautv. ex V.I.Krecz. & Gontsch.; Juncus cyprius H.Lindb.; Juncus depauperatus Ten.; Juncus diaphragmarius Brot.; Juncus elatus Steud.; Juncus equisetosus Dumort.; Juncus glaucescens Laharpe; Juncus inflexus subsp. austrooccidentalis K.F.Wu; Juncus inflexus f. equisetosus (Dumort.) Soó; Juncus inflexus f. strictus Soó; Juncus leptocarpus Buchenau; Juncus longicornis Bastard; Juncus luetkei Buchenau; Juncus tenax Banks & Sol.; Juncus warakensis Nábelek

= Juncus inflexus =

Species of rush

Juncus inflexus, the hard rush, is a species of flowering plant in the family Juncaceae, native to Europe, Asia and Africa, and introduced in Sri Lanka, Java, Île Amsterdam and Île Saint-Paul, Victoria in Australia, New Zealand, Uruguay, and eastern North America. It is a glycophyte (non-halophyte).

== Description ==
J. inflexus is a rhizomatous tufted perennial usually growing 0.5 – 1m tall. The stiff, glaucous stems are thin and wiry, measuring 1 – 2.5 mm in diameter. They are lined with 15 – 20 distinct vertical ridges and filled with interrupted spongy pith. Stomata are arranged along the stem in 5 – 10 rows.

The basal sheaths are a shiny reddish black.

It blooms from late spring until midsummer, producing loose clusters of very small reddish-brown flowers at the top of some stems. These later ripen into brown short-beaked seed capsules.

== Habitat and ecology ==
Generally common in England and Wales, but rarer in Scotland. It grows in open wet places such as springs, marshes, wet pastures, and damp meadows as well as by rivers, ponds, and lakes. It prefers heavy base-rich or neutral soils consolidated by trampling.

Appears to be tolerant of annual mowing and light to moderate grazing. It is unpalatable to cattle and eaten by rabbits probably only when grazing pressure is high.

== Subtaxa ==
The following subspecies are currently accepted:

- Juncus inflexus subsp. brachytepalus (Trautv. ex V.I.Krecz. & Gontsch.) Novikov
- Juncus inflexus subsp. inflexus

Distinguished as follows:-

	ssp. inflexus	ssp. brachytepalus
Stem diameter (lower)	1.5-3 mm	5-10 mm
Capsule	2.5-3.3 mm	to 4 mm
compared to perianth	c. equal	usually exceeds
Inflorescence	diffuse	dense
Cataphylls	dark	light-medium
