= Gloster Meteor F8 "Prone Pilot" =

Experimental British jet aircraft

WK935
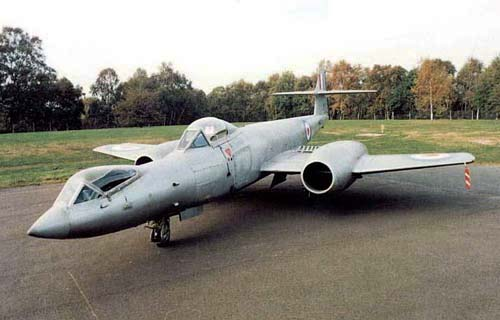

General information
- Type: Fighter Gloster Meteor F8
- Manufacturer: Armstrong-Whitworth
- Owners: Royal Air Force
- Serial: WK935

History
- First flight: 10 February 1954
- Preserved at: Royal Air Force Museum Cosford
- Fate: On display

A heavily modified Gloster Meteor F8 fighter, the "prone position/prone pilot" Meteor, was used by the Royal Air Force in 1954 and 1955 to evaluate the effects of acceleration/inertia-induced forces while flying in a prone position. Along with the Reid and Sigrist R.S.4 "Bobsleigh", the Gloster Meteor was engaged in a proof-of-concept experimental programme that proved in practice that the difficulties in rearward visibility and ejection outweighed the advantages of sustaining higher g effects.

== Design and development ==
In the early 1950s the adoption of a prone position cockpit in future combat aircraft designs appeared attractive for two reasons. Firstly, such a configuration enabled the frontal area of the airframe to be reduced and therefore reduced drag. Secondly, aircrew can withstand greater inertial forces if not sitting upright, a vital consideration given the need for jet combat aircraft to manoeuvre at ever increasing speeds. While the Reid and Sigrist R.S.4 "Bobsleigh" explored low speed performance 1951–1956, the Royal Air Force soon also needed a higher performance concept aircraft.

The Bristol Aeroplane Company sought to exploit these advantages by incorporating a prone pilot position in its proposal for a rocket-powered fighter, the Bristol Type 185. In order to establish the viability of a prone pilot cockpit, the RAF Institute of Aviation Medicine required a jet aircraft that could be flown in experimental flight tests. The last production Meteor F8, serial WK935, built by Armstrong-Whitworth was selected for modification and joined the Institute in autumn 1954.

Armstrong-Whitworth carried out the modifications as an "in-house" project. The standard fighter cockpit was retained; WK935 was never flown solo from the radically modified front cockpit, which incorporated a custom-built couch, offset tiny control column, and suspended rear pedals. A Meteor NF 12 tail unit was substituted for the usual F8 tail. The Armstrong-Whitworth Chief Test Pilot Eric George Franklin carried out the test flights.

The prone pilot's emergency escape involved a complex procedure which included jettisoning the rudder pedals, crawling backward to an escape hatch and retracting the nose wheel. This system was never used.

== Operational history ==
=== Testing and evaluation ===
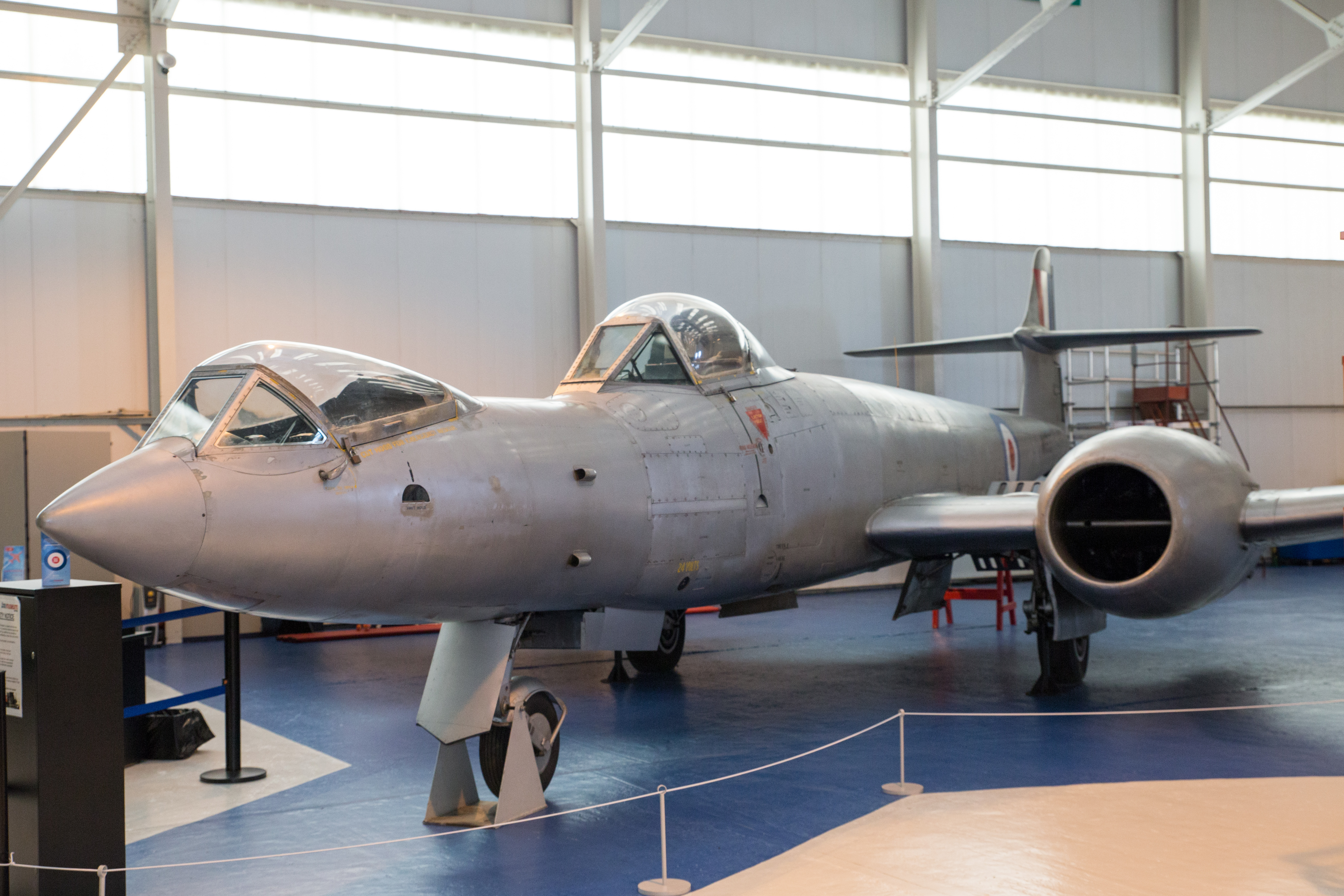
Meteor F8 WK935 at Royal Air Force Museum Cosford

Following some 55 hours of flight testing over 99 flights, the results were inconclusive; although the prone position concept was feasible, the development of special aviation clothing (g-suits) offered a simpler solution to the problem of counteracting inertial forces, and the prone position Meteor was no longer needed. Although prone pilots were able to control the aircraft as well as a standard Meteor, the extreme forward position with limited rear view presented a problem in mock combat with conventional aircraft. RAF test pilot C.M. Lambert described flying Meteor WK935 in the 30 March 1956 issue of Flight magazine.

Meteor F8 WK935 was retired after a year and after storage at No. 12 Maintenance Unit, the aircraft was sent to RAF Colerne before being preserved at the Royal Air Force Museum Cosford. In 2024 the Meteor moved to the Newark Air Museum on loan from the RAF Museum.

== Operators ==
United Kingdom

- Royal Air Force

== Specifications (Meteor F.8 modified) ==
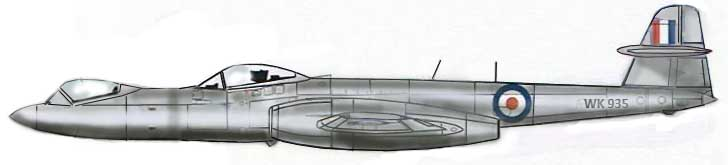
Artist's impression

Data from The Great Book of Fighters

General characteristics

- Crew: 2
- Length: 52 ft 5 in (15.98 m)
- Wingspan: 37 ft 2 in (11.33 m)
- Height: 13 ft 0 in (3.96 m)
- Wing area: 350 sq ft (33 m^{2})
- Airfoil: root: EC(12.5)40/0640; tip: EC1040/0640
- Empty weight: 10,684 lb (4,846 kg)
- Gross weight: 15,700 lb (7,121 kg)
- Powerplant: 2 × Rolls-Royce Derwent 8 centrifugal-flow turbojet engines, 3,500 lbf (16 kN) thrust each

Performance

- Maximum speed: 600 mph (970 km/h, 520 kn) at
- Maximum speed: Mach 0.82
- Service ceiling: 43,000 ft (13,000 m)
- Rate of climb: 7,000 ft/min (36 m/s)
- Time to altitude: 30,000 ft (9,100 m) in 5 minutes
- Wing loading: 44.9 lb/sq ft (219 kg/m^{2})
- Thrust/weight: 0.45

== See also ==
Aircraft of comparable role, configuration, and era

- Blohm & Voss BV 40
- Henschel Hs 132
- Lockheed EF-80
- Northrop XP-79
- Reid and Sigrist R.S.4 "Bobsleigh"
