= PC 1000 =

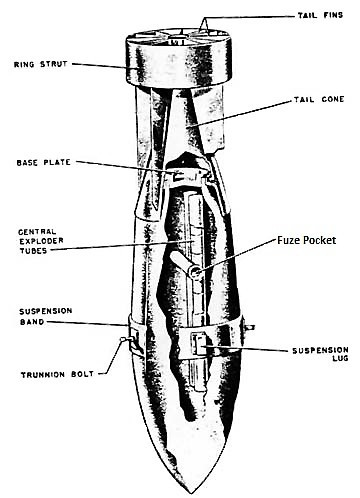
- Type: Armor-piercing bomb
- Place of origin: Nazi Germany

Service history
- Used by: Luftwaffe
- Wars: World War II

Specifications
- Mass: 1,000 kg (2,200 lb)
- Length: 2.16 m (7 ft 1 in)
- Diameter: 508 mm (20 in)
- Warhead: TNT
- Warhead weight: 160 kg (350 lb)

The PC 1000 (Panzersprengbombe Cylindrisch) or cylindrical armor-piercing explosive bomb in English was an armor-piercing bomb used by the Luftwaffe during World War II.

== History ==
The PC series of bombs differed from the SC series because they had thick cases for enhanced penetration of armored targets like warships or reinforced concrete fortifications. The PC 1000 was capable of breaking through most concrete roofs. While the SD series bombs could be used in a semi-armor piercing role the PC series of bombs were specifically designed as armor-piercing bombs. Since they had thicker hardened steel cases their charge to weight ratio was only 20% of their total weight. Bombs in the PC series included the PC 500, PC 1000, PC 1400, and PC 1600. The number in the bombs designation corresponded to the approximate weight of the bomb. The smaller bombs had either Amatol or TNT while the larger bombs were filled more powerful explosives like RDX and Trialen to compensate for their reduced charges. The PC series of bombs were fitted with a time delay fuze which detonated the bomb after it had pierced a target destroying it with a combination of its blast and fragments. The PC series served as a base for the later PC RS series rocket propelled bombs which were designed to enhance penetration by increasing their terminal velocity.

== Design ==
The PC series of bombs differed from the SC series because they had thick cases for enhanced penetration of armored targets like warships. The nose of the bomb was thick and the charge to weight ratio of the bomb was only 16%. The body was of one-piece forged steel construction which was filled through the base with TNT and was fitted with a magnesium alloy 4 finned tail with a cylindrical strut. There was a single transverse fuze pocket near the base of the bomb and there were two central exploders which ran through the explosives. The PC 1000 was horizontally suspended by a suspension band and H-Type suspension lug in a bomb bay or fuselage hardpoint. There were also trunnions for use by dive bombers. The body of the bombs were painted sky blue, while the tail was painted aluminum with a blue stripe.

== See also ==
- List of weapons of military aircraft of Germany during World War II
