= Lamson PL-1 Quark =

American homebuilt glider

PL-1 Quark

General information
- Type: Glider
- National origin: United States
- Designer: Philip Lamson
- Status: Production completed
- Number built: one

History
- Introduction date: 1964
- First flight: 1965

The Lamson PL-1 Quark was an American high-wing, single-seat, glider that was designed and constructed by Philip Lamson, first flying in early 1965.

== Design and development ==
Lamson designed and built the Quark in 1964 as a lighthearted experimental aircraft project to create a prone position-pilot glider. To this end the pilot was accommodated lying down with his head in the nose bubble.

The PL-1 is constructed from fiberglass, with the wings made from a balsa-fiberglass sandwich that was laid up in a female mold. The wing was originally of 20 ft (6.1 m) span, but this was quickly increased to 30 ft (9.1 m) with tip extensions and finally the aircraft received a new 40 ft (12.2 m) three-piece wing. The airfoil was an Irv Culver modification to the NACA 0012. The landing gear was a monowheel, with small wing tip skids.

Soaring Magazine described the aircraft as "purely a lark and a quirky lark at that". The designer described the performance as "somewhere between a Nimbus and a Rogallo".

Only one Quark was built and it was registered with the US Federal Aviation Administration in the Experimental - amateur-built category.

== Operational history ==
The aircraft logged about 300 hours in its 30 ft (9.1 m) wingspan version. The Quark was removed from the FAA registry on 13 August 2002 and the aircraft likely no longer exists.

== Specifications (Quark) ==
Data from Soaring

General characteristics

- Crew: one
- Length: 10 ft (3.0 m)
- Wingspan: 40 ft (12 m)
- Wing area: 88.89 sq ft (8.258 m^{2})
- Aspect ratio: 18:1
- Airfoil: Irv Culver modification to the NACA 0012
- Empty weight: 340 lb (154 kg)
- Gross weight: 504 lb (229 kg)

Performance

- Wing loading: 5.67 lb/sq ft (27.7 kg/m^{2})

== See also ==
Aircraft of comparable role, configuration, and era

- Farrar V-1 Flying Wing - another prone position glider
- Miller M-5 Belly Flopper
- O'Neill Pea Pod

Related lists

- List of gliders
