= Henschel Hs 132 =

1945 prototype multi-role combat aircraft by Henschel

Hs 132
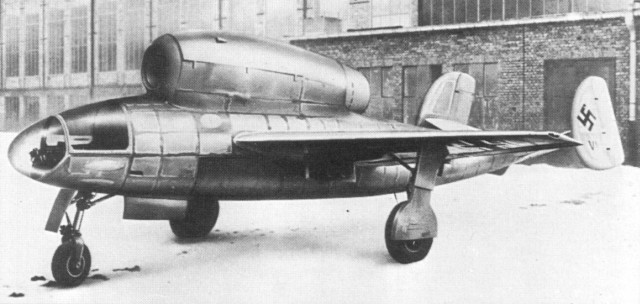
- An airbrushed G. Heumann drawing of the P.132

General information
- Type: Dive bomber and interceptor aircraft
- Manufacturer: Henschel Flugzeugwerke AG
- Status: Never flown
- Primary user: Luftwaffe
- Number built: 4 prototypes

History
- Manufactured: 1945

The Henschel Hs 132 was a jet-powered dive bomber and interceptor aircraft designed and produced by the German aircraft manufacturer Henschel Flugzeugwerke AG. It was developed during the latter portion of the Second World War with the intention of being adopted by the Luftwaffe, but this did not come to fruition.

Work commenced on the Hs 132 in February 1943 in response to a specification issued by the Reichsluftfahrtministerium (RLM – the German Aviation Ministry) for a new attack aircraft. Henschel opted for a relatively unorthodox design that, amongst other features, used a top-mounted BMW 003 jet engine (identical in terms of make and position to the powerplant used by the Heinkel He 162), a retractable nosewheel undercarriage and the pilot in a prone position. The aircraft intentionally made as little use of strategic materials as possible, such as its use of wooden wings, and had a relatively simplistic structure despite it being designed to withstand 12 g, considerably more than typical dive bombers of the era.

In response to the RLM's approval of the project, construction of three prototypes was started during March 1945. However, two months later, Henschel's plant at Schönefeld was captured by the advancing Soviet Army; accordingly, all of the incomplete prototypes fell into Soviet hands and their fate thereafter is unknown. At that point, Hs 132 V1 was scheduled to commence flight testing only one month later.

== Design and development ==
=== Background ===
By the mid point of the Second World War, it had become clear that the dive bombers operated by the Luftwaffe, such as the Junkers Ju 87 Stuka, were highly vulnerable to high performance Allied fighter aircraft and thus there was great interest in improving Germany's bombing capability. The level bombing approach was one option, however, due to Germany's lack of suitable bombsights, this was undesirable due to poorer accuracy, especially when flying at increasingly high speeds, achievable via recent advances such as the turbojet. Accordingly, the German aircraft manufacturer Henschel Flugzeugwerke AG conceptualised a turbojet-powered dive bomber.

Separately, there had long been interest in the idea of combat aircraft being flown by pilots in the prone position, which would reduce the effect of g-forces during manoeuvring. Several aircraft had already experimented with this layout for various reasons, the Horten IIIf had a prone pilot, but this was primarily to reduce drag in this high-performance glider, while the DFS 228 reconnaissance glider also used a prone pilot to make it easier to seal its pressurized cabin. It was not until the Berlin B9 was built specifically to test this arrangement for improved g-load that any serious effort toward development could be carried out.

Starting in early 1943, the Berlin B9 twin-piston engined experimental aircraft demonstrated that it was indeed possible for a pilot to fly the aircraft lying down, and that it did improve his ability to handle high loads. The pilot had an extremely restricted field of view upward or to the rear that made it suitable only for certain roles, including bombers or fighters or interceptors with a major speed advantage over their opposition. Based on this research, several late-war German designs followed the B9's lead and used a prone pilot. Better g-load performance was not the only reason, however, as this layout also reduced the frontal area of the aircraft. This was a serious concern for interceptors attacking the USAAF's Boeing B-17 Flying Fortress, as calculations showed that the chance of being hit by its defensive guns was largely a function of frontal area.

=== Design effort ===
On 18 February 1943, the Reichsluftfahrtministerium (RLM – the German Aviation Ministry) released a specification that called for a single-seat shipping attack aircraft to counter an expected Allied invasion of Europe. A piston-engined aircraft was called for at the time, however, the performance requirements motivated the switch to jet power instead. Henschel opted to produce a response to the specification; the design team favoured the high speeds offered by turbojet propulsion as it was felt that survivability, and therefore viability, of the prospective aircraft would be bolstered by using its high speeds to evade interception by Allied defences. Furthermore, as a consequence of these high speed dive attacks, the aircraft would be subject to high g-forces when pulling out; thus, the resulting aircraft was designed to withstand 12 g (conventional dive bombers of the era were typically designed to withstand 8 g). To enable the pilot to better withstand such g-forces, it was deemed essential for the pilot to by in the prone position.

Several other factors were taken into consideration during the design phase. As Germany's position declined sharply during the latter portion of the war, there were shortages of both key materials and skill labourers. Accordingly, the aircraft was intentionally designed to minimise its use of strategic materials and to be as simplistic as possible. The structure was not only designed to be simple but also relatively easy to maintain. The BMW 003 engine that powered the aircraft was mounted on the back of the fuselage above the wing and was positioned at roughly shoulder-height as a result of the low ground height of the aircraft. While this placement of the engine was suboptimal in terms of intake performance, incurring increased drag at high speeds due to interference from the engine-fuselage fairing junctions, the design team were aware that the Heinkel He 162, the winners of the contemporary Volksjäger ("people's fighter") design competition, had a similar engine layout and thus were encouraged as to its viability.

The Hs 132 had a roughly cigar-shaped fuselage with short-span mid-set wings and a retractable nosewheel undercarriage. The horizontal stabilizer possessed considerable dihedral ending in twin rounded-front vertical stabilizers; this 'butterfly'-like twin rudder arrangement kept the tail surfaces clear of the jet efflux. The cockpit was completely faired into the fuselage contour along with a rounded clear nosecone on the front of the aircraft. Directly behind was the actual "window," a large armored-glass plate located some distance behind the extreme nose; the glazing extended almost to the wing root. Every flight control surface was fitted with trim tabs. Due to the intended shallowness of the aircraft's dive attack, there were no dive brakes fitted. Despite the similarity of appearance to the He 162, the Hs 132 was intended to perform dive-bombing and ground attack missions rather that fighter duties. In terms of its construction, the airframe made extensive use of non-strategic materials, notably in the wings, which were of wooden construction. The basic Hs 132A carried a single 500 kg (1,100 lb) bomb and lacked any other armament. It was to begin its attack in a shallow dive outside the ships' range of fire, and after reaching a speed of 910 km/h (570 mph; 490 kn), the pilot would "toss" the bomb at the target using a simple computerized sight, and then climb back out of range. This computerized bombsight was not delivered in time to be fitted to the aircraft.

=== Prototypes and envisioned developments ===
During April or May 1944, Henschel submitted their proposal to the RLM, by which point wind tunnel testing of the basic layout had already commenced. A contract for six prototypes was approved in May 1944. Construction of three prototypes commenced at the company's Schönefeld facility during March 1945. Hs 132 V1 was scheduled to have its first flight in June 1945, however, advancing Soviet forces captured it along with the other two incomplete prototypes during May 1945. Allegedly, while the wings and fuselage of He 132 V1 had been completed, they were never mated and the wings had never been transferred from their factory outside of Dresden.

Several other versions of the basic airframe were proposed by Henschel. The Hs 132B was to have been powered by a single Junkers Jumo 004 engine in place of the BMW 003; it also would have added a pair of 20 mm (0.79 in) MG 151/20 cannons. The HS 132C was a more extensively modified version that was intended for bomber interception; it featured the larger Heinkel HeS 011 engine, two 20 mm (0.79 in) 151/20s and two 30 mm (1.2 in) MK 103 or MK 108 cannons. The HeS 011, intended to power a wide variety of new and existing Luftwaffe aircraft (an example of the latter being the proposed D and P series of the Arado Ar 234 jet bomber), was still in the pre-production phase when the conflict ended. It was hoped that by the time the HS 132B became available, the Panzerblitz anti-tank missile would be in production and available for use. The Hs 132D included a new wing of increased span.

== Variants ==
Hs 132A Dive bomber
BMW 003 turbojet engine, 1 × 500 kg (1,100 lb) bomb
Hs 132B Dive bomber/Anti-tank plane
Jumo 004 turbojet engine, 1 × 500 kg (1,102 lb) bomb, 2 × 20 mm MG 151 cannon, and/or six or eight Panzerblitz anti-tank rockets
Hs 132C Dive bomber
He S 011 turbojet engine, 1 × 500 kg (1,100 lb) bomb, 2 × 20 mm MG 151 cannon and 2 × 30 mm (1.2 in) MK 103 cannon
Hs 132D
Increased wingspan variant

== Specifications (Hs 132A) ==
Data from German aircraft of the Second World War

General characteristics

- Crew: 1
- Length: 8.9 m (29 ft 2 in)
- Wingspan: 7.2 m (23 ft 7 in)
- Wing area: 14.82 m^{2} (159.5 sq ft)
- Gross weight: 3,400 kg (7,496 lb)
- Powerplant: 1 × BMW 109-003E-2 turbojet engine, 7.8 kN (1,760 lbf) thrust

Hs 132B 1x 8.8 kN (1,980 lbf) Junkers Jumo 109-004B turbojet
Hs 132C 1x 12.75 kN (2,866 lbf) Heinkel-Hirth 109-011A turbojet

Performance

- Maximum speed: 780 km/h (480 mph, 420 kn) without bomb at 6,000 m (20,000 ft) ; 700 km/h (430 mph; 380 kn) with bomb
- Landing speed: 153 km/h (95 mph; 83 kn)
- Range: 680 km (420 mi, 370 nmi) at 4,000 m (13,000 ft) ; 1,120 km (700 mi; 600 nmi) at 10,000 m (33,000 ft)
- Service ceiling: 10,250 m (33,630 ft)

Armament

Hs 132A

1x 500 kg (1,100 lb) SD 500 bomb semi-resessed under the fuselage

Hs132B

2x nose mounted 20 mm (0.787 in) MG 151 cannon
1x 500 kg (1,100 lb) bomb semi-recessed under the fuselage
6/8x Panzerblitz III anti-tank rockets under wings

Hs 132C

2x nose mounted 20 mm (0.787 in) MG 151 cannon
2x nose mounted 30 mm (1.181 in) MK 103 cannon

or

2x nose mounted 20 mm (0.787 in) MG 151 cannon
1x 1,000 kg (2,200 lb) SC 1000 bomb semi-resessed under the fuselage

or

2x nose mounted 20 mm (0.787 in) MG 151 cannon
1x 1,000 kg (2,200 lb) PC 1000 RS Pol rocket-assisted armour-piercing bomb semi-resessed under the fuselage

== See also ==
Aircraft of comparable role, configuration, and era

- Heinkel He 162

Related lists

- List of jet aircraft of World War II
- List of military aircraft of Germany
