= Farrar V-1 Flying Wing =

American glider

V-1 Flying Wing

General information
- Type: Glider
- National origin: United States
- Designer: Demetrius F. Farrar Jr.
- Status: Production completed
- Number built: one

History
- Introduction date: 1962

The Farrar V-1 Flying Wing is an American, single-seat, flying wing glider that was designed and constructed by Demetrius F. Farrar Jr. in 1962.

== Design and development ==
The V-1 was an attempt to create a glider design based on the Northrop Corporation flying wing designs of the 1940s, such as the Northrop YB-49.

The aircraft is made from metal and wood, with doped aircraft fabric covering. Its 26 ft (7.9 m) span wing employs a modified Northrop airfoil and tip-mounted ailerons, in the form of rotating wing tips, of 2 ft (0.6 m) each. A single vertical stabilizer and rudder was mounted at the rear of the wing center trailing edge. The cockpit is located within the wing center section and the pilot flies in the prone position.

Only one V-1 was built and it was registered with the Federal Aviation Administration in the Experimental - Amateur-built category.

== Operational history ==
In August 2011 the sole V-1 was still listed on the FAA aircraft register and still owned by the designer, 49 years after it was completed. The registration was cancelled after expiring and not being renewed on 20 May 2015. It is not known whether the aircraft still exists or not.

== Specifications (V-1) ==
Data from Sailplane Directory

General characteristics

- Crew: one
- Wingspan: 26 ft 0 in (7.92 m)
- Wing area: 90 sq ft (8.4 m^{2})
- Aspect ratio: 7.51:1
- Airfoil: modified Northrop
- Empty weight: 175 lb (79 kg)
- Gross weight: 350 lb (159 kg)

Performance

- Maximum glide ratio: 36:1
- Rate of sink: 120 ft/min (0.61 m/s)
- Wing loading: 3.89 lb/sq ft (19.0 kg/m^{2})

== See also ==
Aircraft of comparable role, configuration, and era

- Lamson PL-1 Quark - another prone-position glider

Related lists

- List of gliders
