= Spränghandgranat m/43 =

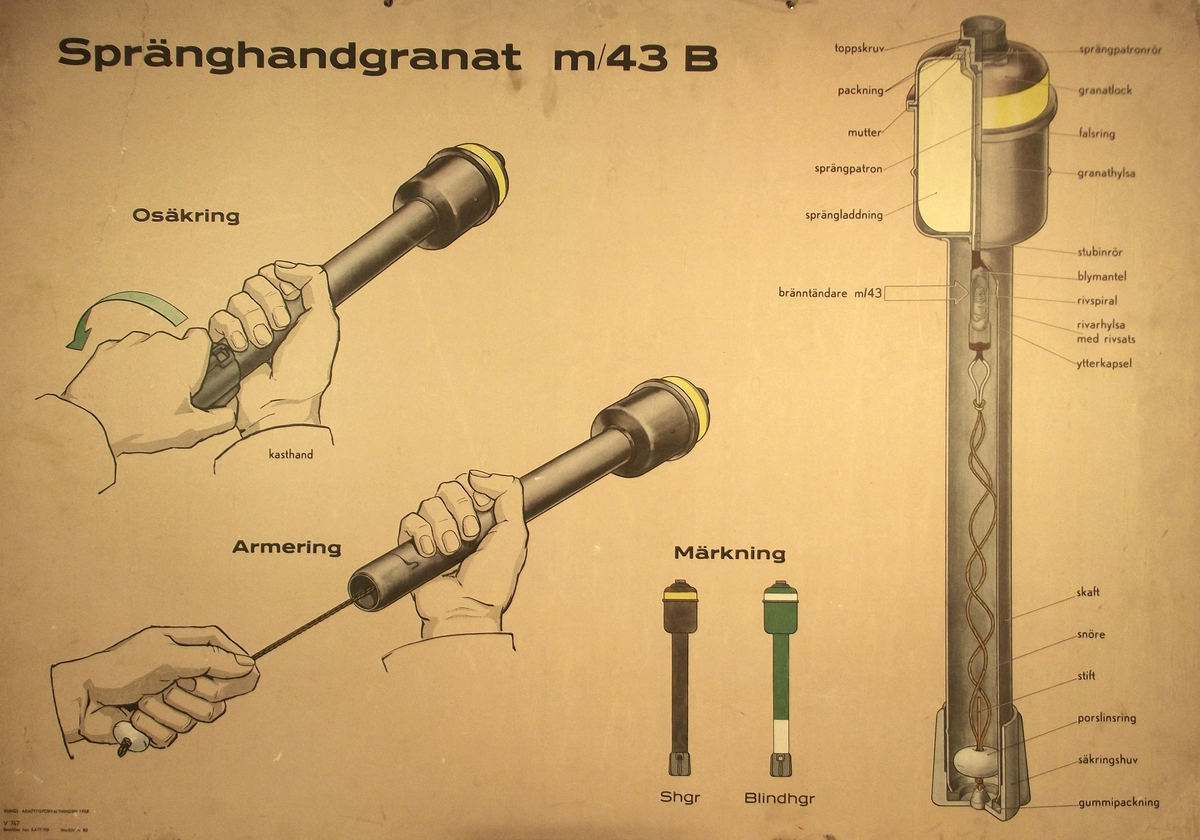
- Schart of the shgr m/43B-
- Type: Stick grenade
- Place of origin: Sweden

Service history
- In service: 1943
- Used by: Sweden

Production history
- Designed: 1943
- Developed from: Stielhandgranate 24
- Variants: shgr m/43, m/43B

Specifications
- Mass: 0.56 kg (1.2 lb); 0.65 kg (1.4 lb) (m/43 B)
- Filling: 0.19 kg (0.42 lb) nitrolite 0.34 kg (0.75 lb) TNT (m/43 B)
- Detonation mechanism: after 4.5 seconds

shgr m/43 (Swedish: Spränghandgranat m/43, lit. 'High-explosive hand grenade model 1943') is a Swedish stick grenade introduced during World War II.

== History ==
To catch up in the arms race leading to World War II, Sweden managed to purchase a large amount of German produced Stielhandgranate 24 in 1939, adopting it as the shgr m/39 (Swedish: Spränghandgranat m/39, lit. 'High-explosive hand grenade model 1939'), including the Übungs-Stielhandgranate 24 practice model övnhgr m/39 (Swedish: Övningshandgranat m/39, lit. 'Practice hand grenade m/39') Such were painted in Swedish color markings.

Later shipments were produced in Sweden and included wartime changes, such as a metal pull cord and cheaper explosives such as nitrolite, with analog practice grenades: m/39, m/39A, m/39B and m/39C. These would remain in use until expended during the Cold War.

The German design was not ideal, promting the construction of an indigenous replacement design. This became the shgr m/43.

== Design ==
The shgr m/43 borrowed the design of the German Stielhandgranate 24, which Sweden had purchased at the start of the war, featuring a hollow shaft with a pullcord for igniting the time-fuze.

It differed in a great number of areas to the m/39, such as having a full metal tube for the handle, a more rounded warhead, and other quality of life additions to the overall design, such as featuring fin-like nubs on the bottom screw to aid removal with gloves in winter warfare.

Some features were carried over from the m/39, such as the igniter and detonator, although later replaced with indigenous post-war designs.

== Variants ==
Two variants where produced, a wartime model, and a post-war model called m/43B.

The grenade head could be equipped with the sskal m/43 fragmentation sleeve (Swedish: sprängskal m/43).

A dummy model, the blindhgr m/43,(Swedish: blindhandgranat m/43) also existed.

Technical data
Model	spränghandgranat m/43 (shgr m/43)	spränghandgranat m/43 B (shgr m/43 B)
Combustion igniter	bränntändare m/39 without nipple, or bränntändare m/43	bränntändare m/43
Detonator	sprängpatron m/39 (sptr m/39), or sprängpatron m/46 (sptr m/46)	sprängpatron m/46 (sptr m/46)
Weight	0.56 kg (1.2 lb)	0.65 kg (1.4 lb)
Charge	0.19 kg (0.42 lb) nitrolite	0.34 kg (0.75 lb) pressed TNT
Delay	4.5 s	4.5 s

== See also ==
- List of World War II firearms of Germany
- List of German military equipment of World War II
- Model 39 grenade – German "egg" type hand grenade
- RGD-33 grenade – Early WWII Soviet stick grenade
- Splitterring – A fragmentation sleeve for the M24 and M43

M24 and M43

- Type 98 grenade
- Type 67 hand grenade
- Type 77 hand grenade
