= Stielhandgranate =

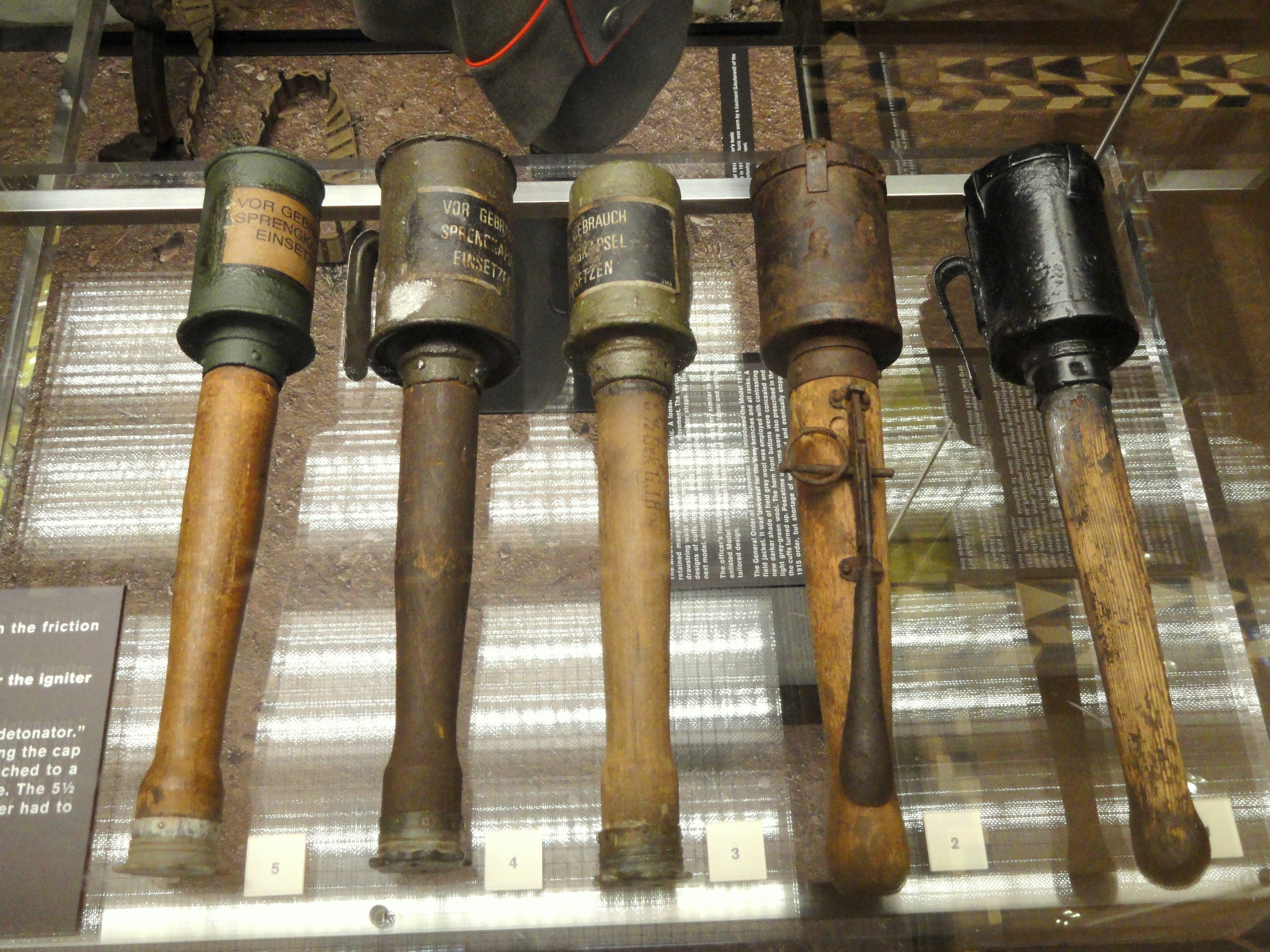
- Stick grenades on display at the National World War I Museum in Kansas City, Missouri
- Type: Hand grenade
- Place of origin: German Empire

Service history
- In service: 1915–1945 (Germany)
- Used by: See § Users
- Wars: World War I; Spanish Civil War; Second Sino-Japanese War; World War II; Cold War

Production history
- Designed: 1915–1943
- Produced: 1915–1945
- Variants: See § Variants

Specifications (Stielhandgranate 15)
- Mass: 820 g (29 oz)
- Length: 240–260 mm (9.4–10.2 in)
- Diameter: 72 mm (2.8 in)
- Filling: Ammonal
- Filling weight: 250 g (8.8 oz)
- Detonation mechanism: 5.5 or 7 seconds timer

Stielhandgranate (lit. "Stick hand grenade") is a series of World War I and World War II–era German hand grenade designs, also known as the Potato masher (German: Kartoffelstampfer), Doorknocker (German: Türklopfer), or Jam-pot and stick grenade (by the British in WWI). The first models were introduced by the Imperial German Army during World War I and the final design was introduced during World War II by the German Wehrmacht.

== Background ==
Germany entered World War I with a single standard grenade type, the Kugelhandgranate. These grenades were heavy, weighing in 1 kilogram (2.2 lb) each and could not be thrown farther than 15–20 metres (16–22 yd), leading to demands for a lighter alternative.

=== Hairbrush grenade ===
Early in the war, German soldiers made use of improvised stick grenades commonly known as the 'hairbrush grenade', which were thought as having a longer throwing range and improved accuracy over the Kugelhandgranate, which would lead to the development of the introduction of the first Stielhandgranate in 1915, though these stopgaps (also known as the 'paddle grenade') remained in use until 1916.

The German hairbrush grenade was a metal box filled with explosives and nailed to a 38 cm (15 in) wooden handle with a spring igniter, fuze, and detonator similar to the ones used on the Stielhandgranate. The early versions of these crude grenades had to be lit by hand (often with a smoking pipe, cigar or cigarette) before throwing. The British and the French also made their own copies, such as the Grenade No. 12 Hairbrush, and the Pétard Raquette.

== Design ==
The original Stielhandgranate 15 relied on its blast effect, which had an effective radius of 15 m (16 yd) on open field. The warhead was made of a thin sheet of steel approximately 10.5–12 cm (4.1–4.7 in) long with a diameter of 7.2 cm (2.8 in) and a metal clip to allow soldiers to carry the complete grenade on their belts, though soldiers frequently carried them inside empty sandbags tied in pairs and slung around the neck.

The 250 g (8.8 oz) explosive filler composition varied among the various private manufacturers contracted by the government, usually black powder, potassium perchlorate, barium nitrate, or ammonium nitrate mixed with aluminium powder before they were replaced in 1916 with TNT.

The warhead was usually coated with paraffin wax to provide some degree of waterproofing and was mounted on a hollow wooden handle 24–26 cm (9.4–10.2 in) long that housed the detonator and pull cord. The complete Stielhandgranate 15 weighted 820 g (29 oz). Subsequent versions featured improved fuses and a screw-cap cover on the detonator pull cord, while the warhead size was reduced. The model 1924 stick grenade used during World War II had a handle 36 cm (14 in) long and weighing in 230 g (8.1 oz) It was lighter than its predecessors. The end of the pull cord also had a small porcelain ball attached.

Demonstration of a German Stielhandgranate 24, 1946.

To arm the grenade, the soldier yanked the pull cord which in turn pulled a rough steel rod through the igniter within the fuse. The rod's abrasive contact would cause sparks and a flame to light, setting the fuse burning. The time delay fuse varied from 5.5 to 7 seconds as marked on the side of the warhead or the handle, although short burning fuses (2–3 seconds) were issued to Stormtroopers. The warhead was stencilled with the reminder Vor Gebrauch Sprengkapsel Einsetzen ("Before use insert detonator").

Percussion fused versions of the Stielhandgranate were introduced in late 1915 with an improved version entering service in 1916. These grenades used a spring-powered plunger that was activated after the warhead hit the ground and had a safety lever fitted on the handle. When the grenade was thrown, the lever flew off arming the grenade. Due to the impact grenades' tendency of failing to explode after landing on mud or on their sides, they were not liked by the troops.

In comparison to the British Mills bomb, the Stielhandgranate could be thrown further since the handle imparted extra momentum. While the Mills was more lethal, producing over 700 fragments upon detonation, the stick grenade produced little fragmentation and a louder report, resulting in a greater morale effect. According to Saunders, the morale effect of the stick grenade was no less important than the lethality, since by 1917, the main purpose of the hand grenade became a matter of forcing the enemy into the lethal zone of small arms and machine gun fire.

== History ==
=== German service ===
While the 'stick grenade' or 'potato masher' was possibly the most recognizable of the hand grenades employed by the Germans in World War I, they also employed a large variety of designs during the conflict, including the ball grenade (Kugelhandgranate), egg grenade (Eierhandgranate), and the discus grenade (Diskushandgranate), besides improvised (behelfs) designs using during the early years and closing months of the conflict, with the latter being made out a wide variety of materials such as wood or concrete. These emergency designs would reappear in the late stages of World War II, in Wehrmacht service.

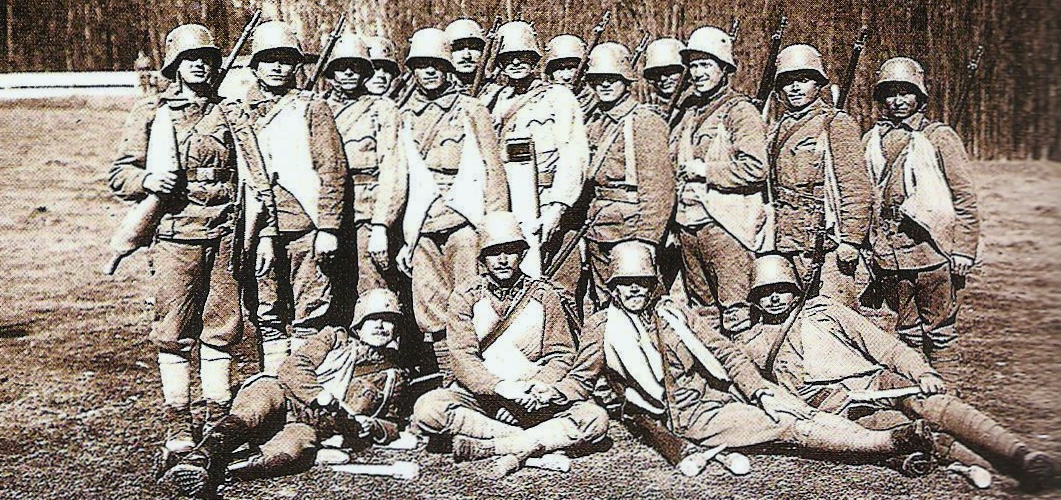
Austro-Hungarian stormtroopers posing with stick grenades, 1917

Although grenades were introduced in 1915, not every German soldier acquired or used them in combat. In early 1916, during the Battle of Verdun, a detachment from the 5th Assault Battalion 'Rohr' led multiple infantry units in small-scale assaults, which lasted from the 10th of January up until March of 1916, when the battalion was sent to Beuville and held assault courses for infantry units, as well as training replacements for its own force. Crown Prince Wilhelm asked the battalion commander, Hauptmann Willy Rohr, as to why the Germans were not more successful during the assaults carried out. Rohr stated that the various branches of service lacked experience and did not cooperate well with each other. But, in particular, the Germans were not trained en masse with the use of hand grenades and simply threw them away in thousands, distrustful of the weapons. The Germans included the usage of hand grenades in training programs for new, and older recruits. By mid 1916, it was a common sight to see a soldier with at least one grenade on him. Stormtroopers carried dozens of stick grenades in empty sandbags slung across their chests when leading assaults.

The Germans often used the stielhandgranate for assaulting enemy fortifications, where it proved to be effective when detonated within the confines of a trench system, building or bunker. As instructed in field manuals, stormtroopers made use of bundle charges by tying together the heads of multiple stielhandgranates onto a single stielhandgranate using small pieces of barbed wire. These, as instructed by field manuals, were primarily used to quickly destroy patches of barbed wire. They also acted as regular grenades, being used during combat in order to achieve a larger blast radius. Additionally, they acted as anti-tank grenades when artillery and field cannons failed to knock a tank out, being used to knock off the tracks off of one.

By 1918, the Stielhandgranate almost completely replaced all other types of grenades used by the Imperial German Army. It was considered as an effective design, though they were heavy and cumbersome to carry.

=== Austro-Hungarian service ===
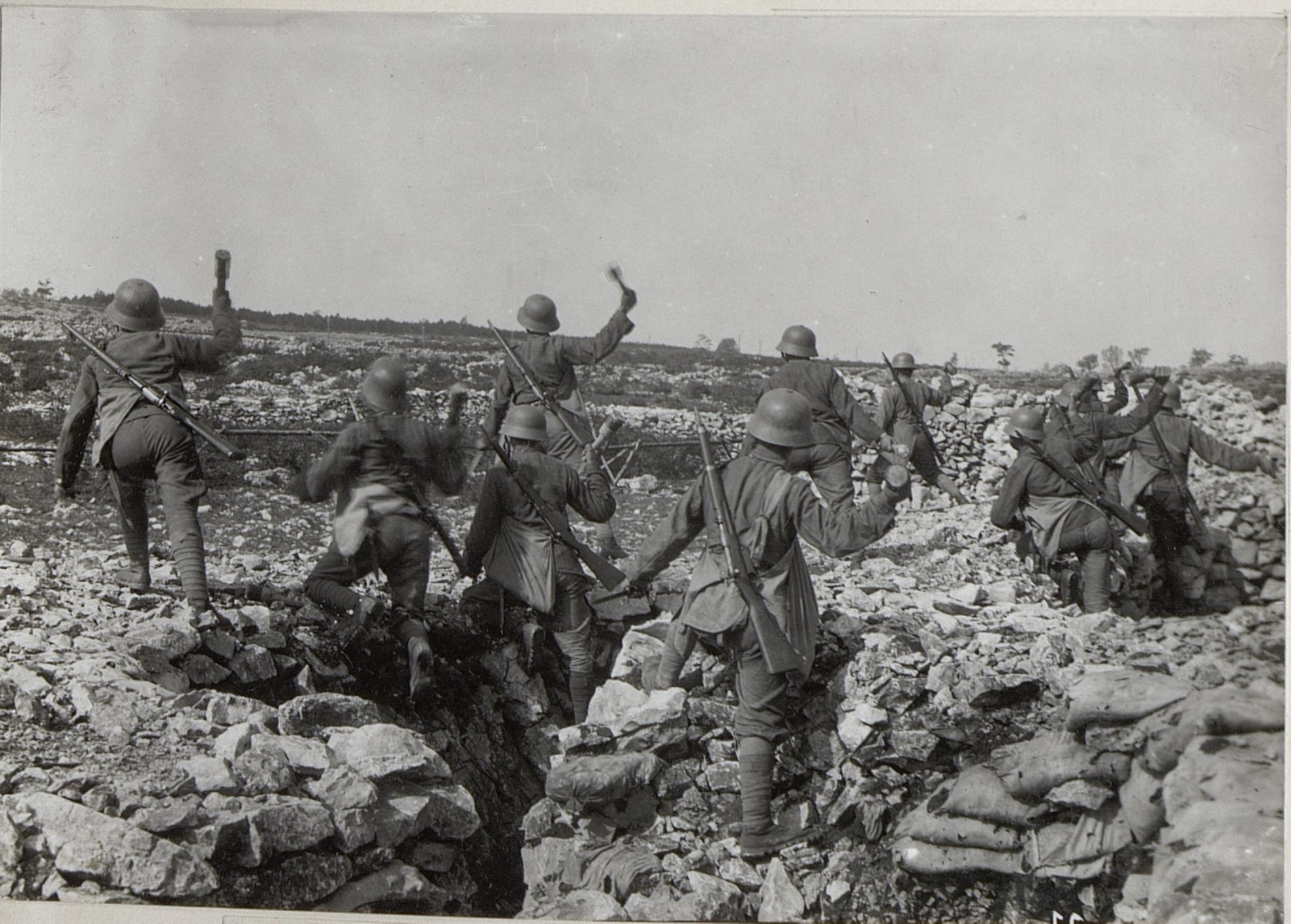
Austro-Hungarian stormtroopers with stick grenades, 1917

The Austro-Hungarian Army started the war with several types of domestically produced hand grenades, but their unreliability often resulted in injuries to the thrower. In 1915–16, the army was re-equipped with German-supplied Stielhandgranate and Eierhandgranate grenades, which were more effective and safer to operate than the Austrian designs. In March 1915, the Austro-Hungarians officially issued their own egg grenade and the Rohr stick grenade, a short cast iron cylinder enclosed in a cardboard tube that served as a throwing handle.

Austro-Hungarian stormtroopers made effective use of bundle charges to breach enemy barbed wire emplacements and blockhouses, often wiring several grenades together to a plank of wood in order to create stronger charges. Elite assault mountain units scaled mountain peaks to infiltrate enemy positions and overrun them by throwing grenades from above and from the flanks of an enemy mountain outpost.

== Variants ==
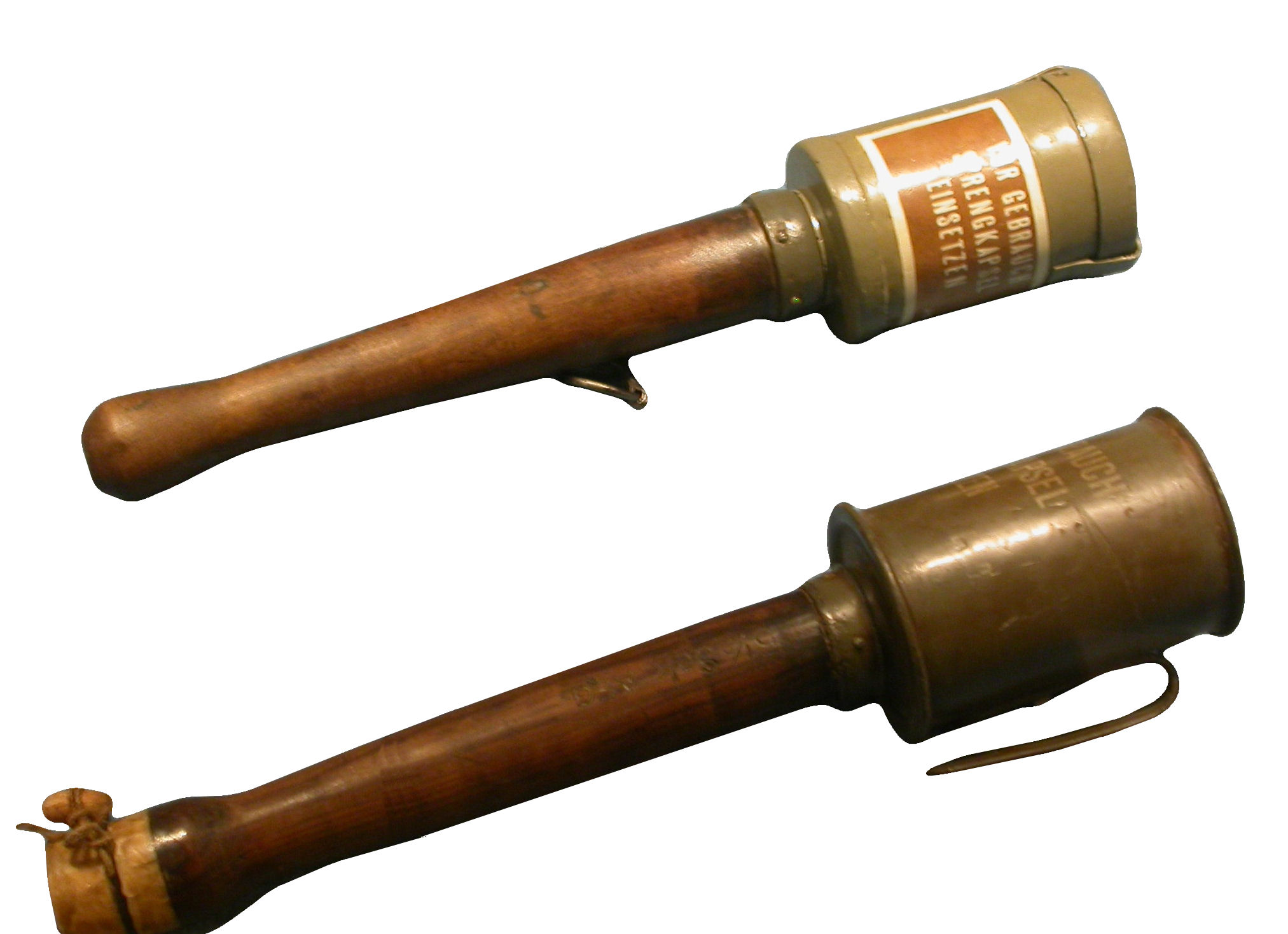
Two WWI-era Stielhandgranate

- Stielhandgranate 15 − Introduced in 1915, it had a 24–26 cm (9.4–10.2 in) long handle with a thin steel sheet head 10.5–12 cm (4.1–4.7 in) long with a diameter of 7.2 cm (2.8 in) containing 250 g (8.8 oz) of explosive filler: usually black powder, potassium perchlorate, barium nitrate or ammonium nitrate mixed with aluminium powder. The warhead was coated with paraffin wax to provide some degree of waterproofing and a featured a clip to hang on a belt
- Stielhandgranate 16 − A modified M1915 with improved fuze and waterproofing, a screw-cap covering the ignition pull cord, and a more powerful trinitrotoluene filling. A variant with a steel handle was commonly known as the Wilhelm
- Stielhandgranate 17 − A modified M1916, the steel warhead was reduced in size to a length of 11 cm (4.3 in) and a diameter of 6 cm (2.4 in). Construction of the head was also changed by using stamped sheet metal instead of crimped steel

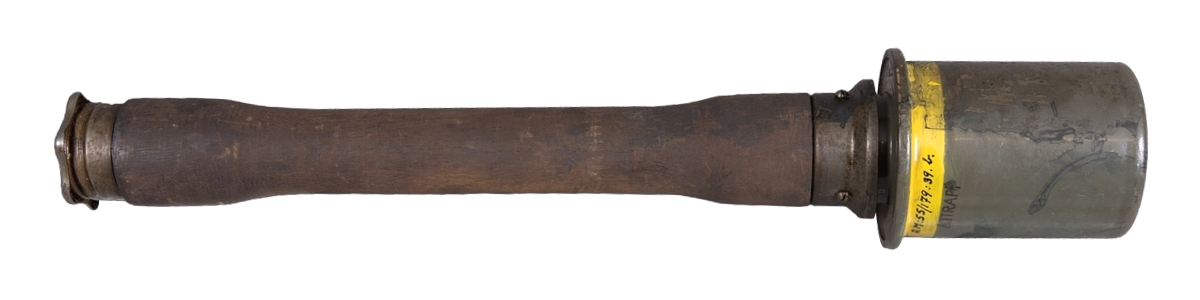
A Swedish Stielhandgranate 24 (spränghandgranat m/39)

- Stielhandgranate 24 − A further refinement of the WWI-era models. The handle is 36 cm (14 in) long, while the warhead contained 170 g (6 oz) of TNT or (substitute) black powder filling and overall weight of 0.23 kg (1/2 lb). Maximum throwing range is up to 50 m (55 yd), depending on the strength and skill of the thrower

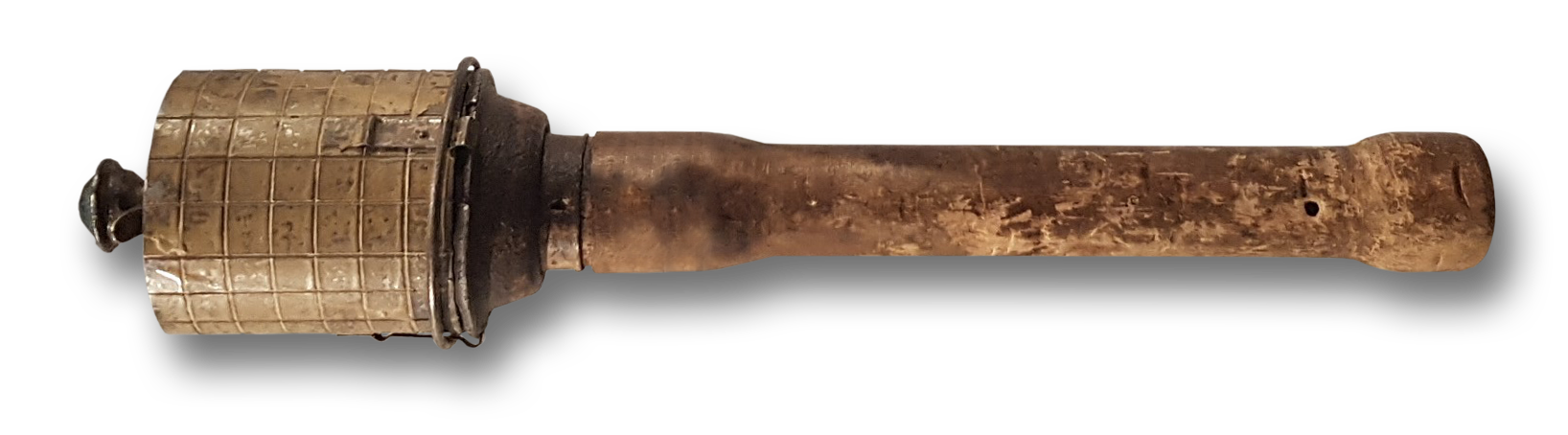
Stielhandgranate 43 with a splitterring fragmentation sleeve

- Stielhandgranate 43 − Similar to the M24, but with the pull cord igniter from the Model 39 grenade screwed on top the warhead and fitted with a solid-wood handle. The head of the grenade was fastened to the handle by four screws and could be removed for practice
- Nebelhandgranate 39 − Standard smoke grenade with the warhead filled with a chemical mixture to generate white smoke. The composition was powdered zinc and hexachloroethane that was released through eight holes located at the base of the warhead which also had a thin white band painted for identification
- Nebelhandgranate 39B − Virtually identical to the Nebelhandgranate 39, but with raised ridges on the handle and thicker white band

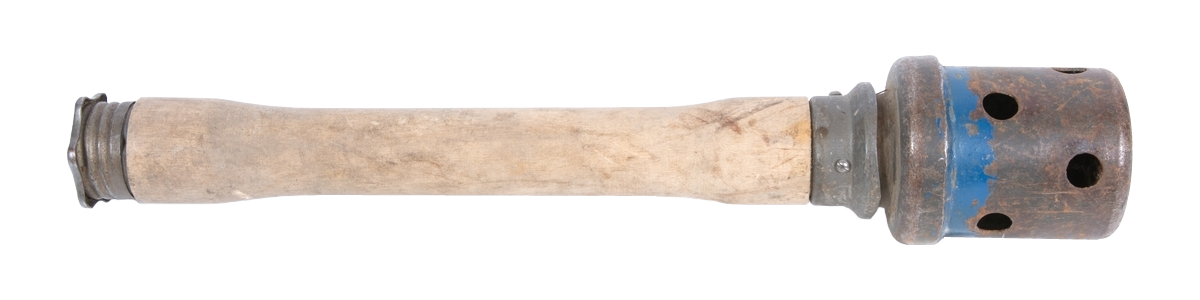
A Swedish Übungs-Stielhandgranate 24 (övningshandgranat m/39)

- Übungs-Stielhandgranate 24 − Dummy grenade for practice. It can be distinguished by the bright-red perforated warhead. It could be outfitted with a special charge that produced a loud report and puff of smoke to simulate an explosion when used. It was also used by Sweden under the designation Övningshandgranat m39
- Behelfs-Handgranate Holz − A last-ditch grenade produced late in the war, it resembled the Model 24, but entirely made of wood. It used the same igniter system, but relied solely on its blast effect
- Behelfs Handgranate Beton − An improvised grenade used in the North African campaign, it resembled a M24 but it used a 13 mm (0.5 in) thick concrete warhead filled with 100 g (3.5 oz) of explosives

=== Derivatives ===
- China – The Chinese made a wide variety of defensive stick grenades featuring scored, serrated, and smooth warheads while the explosive filling ranged from picric acid, TNT or nitroglycerin mixed with potassium nitrate, or sawdust and Amatol; according to Janes, these grenades produce more dust than fragments while the picric acid grenades are dangerously unstable.
- China: Type 67 hand grenade
- China: Type 77 hand grenade
- Finland: Varsikranaatti m/32 – Finnish stick grenade, it was slightly smaller and lighter than the M24, while it retained the metal clip used on World War I-era models
- Finland: Varsikranaatti m/41 − Virtually identical to the m/32, but with the belt clip omitted
- Japan: Type 98 stick hand grenade − A Japanese derivative based on the Chinese stick grenades, it was smaller than the Model 24, but it produced more fragments since it used a cast iron warhead 5 mm (0.20 in) thick
- Sweden: Spränghandgranat m/43 − Swedish all-metal stick grenade, featuring a more rounded warhead and other minor modifications

== Users ==
The German Stielhandgranate-series has been used in many conflicts, including both world wars.

Official and unofficial users of all versions of the Stielhandgranate
User	Type of service	Self-manufactured	Type of model in use				
User	Type of service	Self-manufactured	Model 1915	Model 1916	Model 1917	Model 1924	Model 1943
Official users
German Empire	Full military service	Yes	Yes	Yes	Yes	No	No
Weimar Republic	Full military service	Yes	No	No	No	Yes	No
Nazi Germany	Full military service	Yes	No	No	No	Yes	Yes
Sweden	Full military service	Yes	No	No	No	Yes	No
Ottoman Empire	Yildirim Army Group (Stormtroopers)	No	Yes	Yes	Yes	No	No
Republic of China	German-trained divisions	No	No	No	No	Yes	No
Unofficial users
Austria-Hungary	Leased/purchased	No	Yes	Yes	Yes	No	No
Kingdom of Hungary	Leased/purchased	No	No	No	No	Yes	Yes
Independent State of Croatia	?	No	?	?	?	Yes	Yes ?
Finland	Leased/purchased	No	No	No	No	Yes	No
Soviet Union	Captured/scavenged	No	No	No	No	Yes	Yes
Latvia	Captured/scavenged	No	Yes	Yes	Yes	No	No
France	Captured/scavenged	No	Yes	Yes	Yes	Yes	Yes

Foreign designs
User	Type of service	Version		
User	Type of service	Chinese copies	Type 98	Type 67
Empire of Japan	Captured/local design produced	Yes	Yes	No
Republic of China	Local design produced	Yes	No	No
China	Local design produced	Yes	No	Yes
North Vietnam	Leased/purchased	No	No	Yes

== See also ==
- List of World War II firearms of Germany
- List of German military equipment of World War II
- Model 39 grenade – German "egg" type hand grenade
- RGD-33 grenade – Early WWII Soviet stick grenade
- Splitterring – A fragmentation sleeve for the M24 and M43
