= Stielhandgranate 24 =

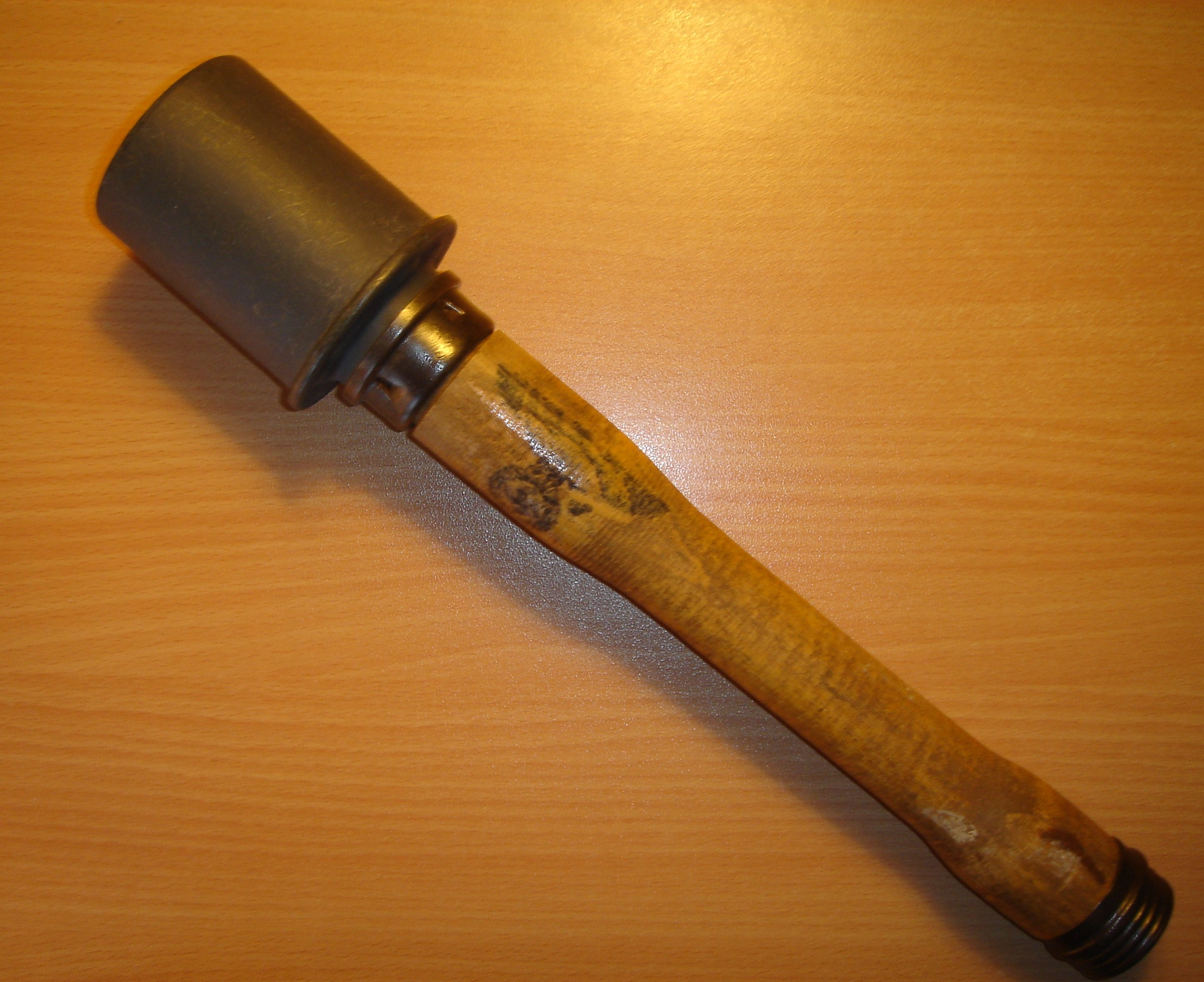
- Type: Hand grenade
- Place of origin: Germany

Service history
- In service: 1924–1945
- Used by: See § Users
- Wars: World War II

Production history
- Produced: 1924–1945
- Variants: See § Variants

Specifications
- Length: 360 mm (1 ft 2 in)
- Diameter: 70 mm (2 3/4 in)
- Filling: TNT
- Filling weight: 170 g (6 oz)
- Detonation mechanism: 4–5 seconds timer

The Stielhandgranate 24 (lit. 'Stick hand grenade 24') or Stg. 24, also known as the potato masher (German: Kartoffelstampfer), or the doorknocker (German: Türklopfer), was an improvement over the stick grenades used by the Germans during World War I, which would be later be augumented during World War II with a fragmentation sleeve while in 1943, the Germans introduced a new variant designated as the Stielhandgranate 43.

== Design and History ==
The Stielhandgranate 24 was an improvement over the stick grenades used during WWI introduced in 1924, with a smoke version (Nebelhandgranate 39) introduced in 1939. The Stg. 24 was one of the main hand grenades used by the Wehrmacht alongside the more commonly used Eihandgranate 39 (lit. 'Egg grenade 39'). In 1943, a simplified variant, the Stielhandgranate 43 was introduced, using the egg grenade fuse screwed upon the warhead and a solid wooden handle. The Germans also made use of 'emergency' (Behelfs) grenades with warheads made of concrete or wood during the final years of WWII; these improvised variants were sometimes unreliable, less durable and poorly protected from the elements, being marginally safe to use even when recently made.

The German-trained Chinese divisions of the National Revolutionary Army were supplied with Stg. 24s, while other divisions made use of locally made copies during the Second Sino-Japanese War. During the war hundreds of thousands of grenades were produced monthly by several arsenals and distributed to NRA units, who used it for close combat situations (due shortages of automatic weapons) or lobbed them down from the top of buildings on advancing Japanese troops.

The Stielhandgranate primarily relied on its concussion blast effect since the thin warhead casing produced little fragmentation upon detonation. Since its effective throwing range was greater than its burst radius, advancing soldiers could throw them in the open without risk of injury. In 1942, the Germans introduced clip-on fragmentation sleeves to increase their lethality, but these were seldomly used by their pioneer units, who relied on the explosive effect alone for demolishing enemy bunkers.

The Stielhandgranate 24 functioned much like its WWI predecessors, with a pull cord to activate the fuse and a screw cap, but the belt clip on the warhead was omitted. The Chinese copies largely varied in shape according to arsenal, but used the same operating mechanism of the Stg. 24. The 11th Arsenal in particular produced direct copies of the original but with a cast iron warhead, while the explosive filler was a mixture of TNT and potassium nitride, resulting in a weaker blast effect.

Soldiers were usually issued with two or three grenades usually tucked on the front their belts or on the top of their jackboots. Chinese soldiers usually carried two stick grenades inside cloth pouches hung on their necks.

The Stg. 24 was a simple to operate design that a recruit could achieve basic proficiency in about three hours of training. The practice stick grenade (Stielhandgranate 24, Übungs) contained a small charge that produced a puff of white smoke that was vented through eight holes in the warhead, but it was usually thrown without the charge.

Nebelhandgranaten 39 (Nb.Hgr. 39) smoke grenades were used to blind the enemy and provide cover during assaults against fortified enemy positions; each Nb. Hgr. 39 released white smoke for 100–120 seconds each. Smoke grenades were also used by anti-tank teams, blinding the enemy tank drivers while other soldiers planted their magnetic charges.

=== Alternative uses ===
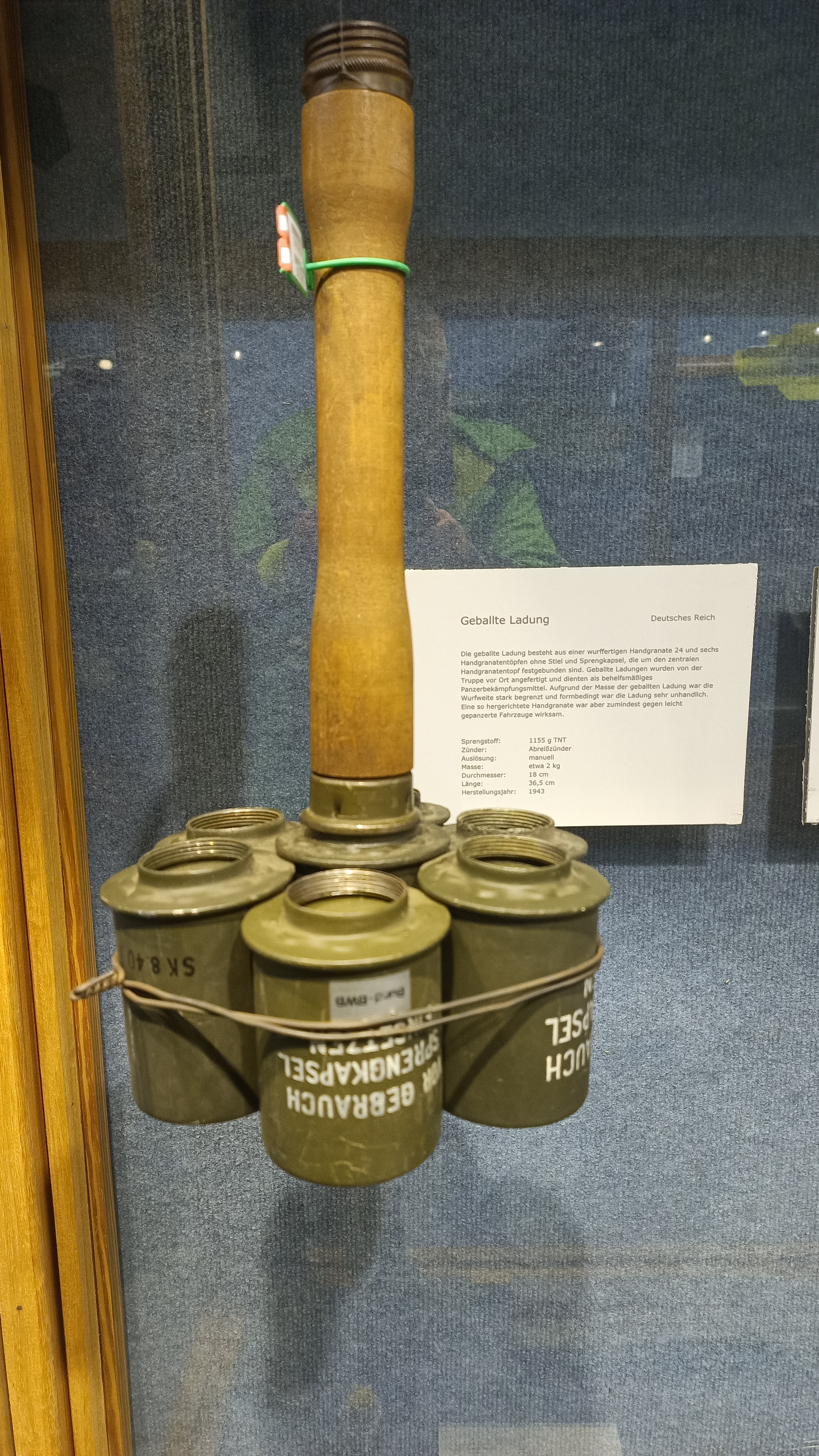
A Geballte Ladung

A versatile weapon, the Stielhandgrenate 24 could be fitted with several warheads to create a bundle charge (German: Geballte Ladung, lit. 'Concentrated charge'). A concept initially developed during World War I, up to six warheads or captured foreign grenades were wired to a seventh grenade with its handle still attached.

A typical WWII-era bundle charge contained approximately 1.2 kg (2 lb 10 oz) of TNT. These charges were thrown at enemy tank treads, engine decks or firing ports, or used to demolish enemy pillboxes. German pioneers placed these improvised charges against the door or threw them into the anti-tank gun embrasures. The Chinese also made use of bundled grenades against Japanese tanks and fortifications; They also tied up one or more grenades to long bamboo poles to stick into the window of an occupied building, preventing the enemy from kicking or throwing the grenade back.

Alternatively, the grenade and extra warheads could be wired to a wooden board at about 15 cm (5.9 in) intervals and then pushed under barbed wire to act as an improvised Bangalore torpedo (German: Gestreckte Ladung, lit. 'Elongated charge'), with a long cord tied to the detonator porcelain bead to detonate the charges. According to Rottman, the Germans used 3 m (9 ft 10 in) long boards with over a dozen warheads placed at 10–15 cm (3.9–5.9 in) intervals.

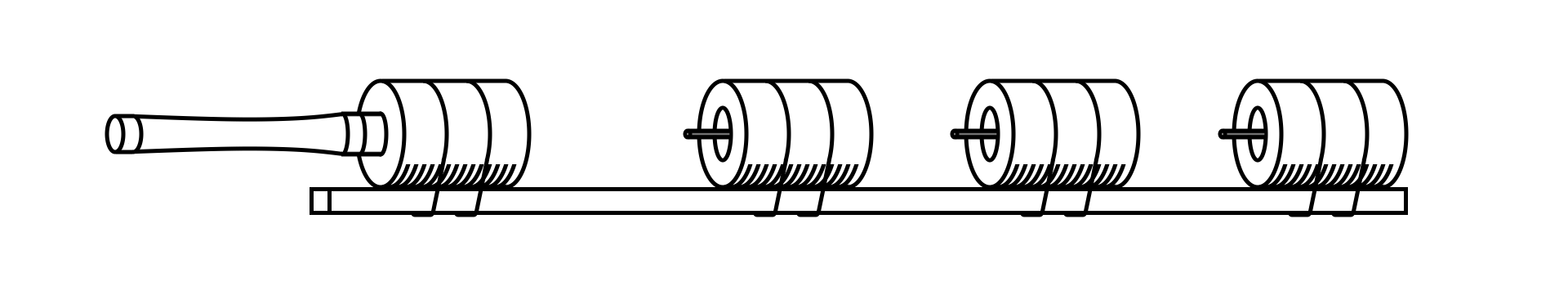
Illustration of a Gestreckte Ladung

The stick grenade was also used to make an incendiary device in WWII by using a jerrycan; holes were bored and plugged with wooden plugs before half-filling it with gasoline, and a Stg. 24 or Nb.Hgr. 39 grenade was tied to the canister. After placing it on the rear engine compartment of an enemy tank, the grenade pullcord was pulled. The detonation either tore the canister apart or drove the wooden plugs out of the holes, igniting the gasoline.

The Germans in WWII made ample use of booby traps, often using the Stielhandgranate 24 or captured British Mills bombs, Soviet F-1s, or American Mk 2 grenades. The grenades were rigged to tripwires or fitted with pressure plates and buried as improvised landmines. Six warheads with their handles removed could be wired on a warhead rigged to a pressure plate to create a makeshift anti-light vehicle mine.

The Germans also used the B.Z. 24 friction igniter, with the time delay fuze removed and rigged to an explosive charge to make booby traps. Since soldiers did not always have the time to remove the time delay mechanism from the M24, they preferred using captured Allied grenades (which were easier to adapt due their smaller size and simpler design) instead.

In an attempt of replacing the rather ineffective Sprengpatrone grenade used by the Kampfpistole, the Germans developed the Wurfkörper 358 LP round, which combined the warhead of Stielhandgranate with a 23 mm (0.91 in) shaft that was inserted into the barrel. The result was a too heavy projectile with such a short range that firers were discouraged to use these special rounds.

== Variants ==
=== Germany ===
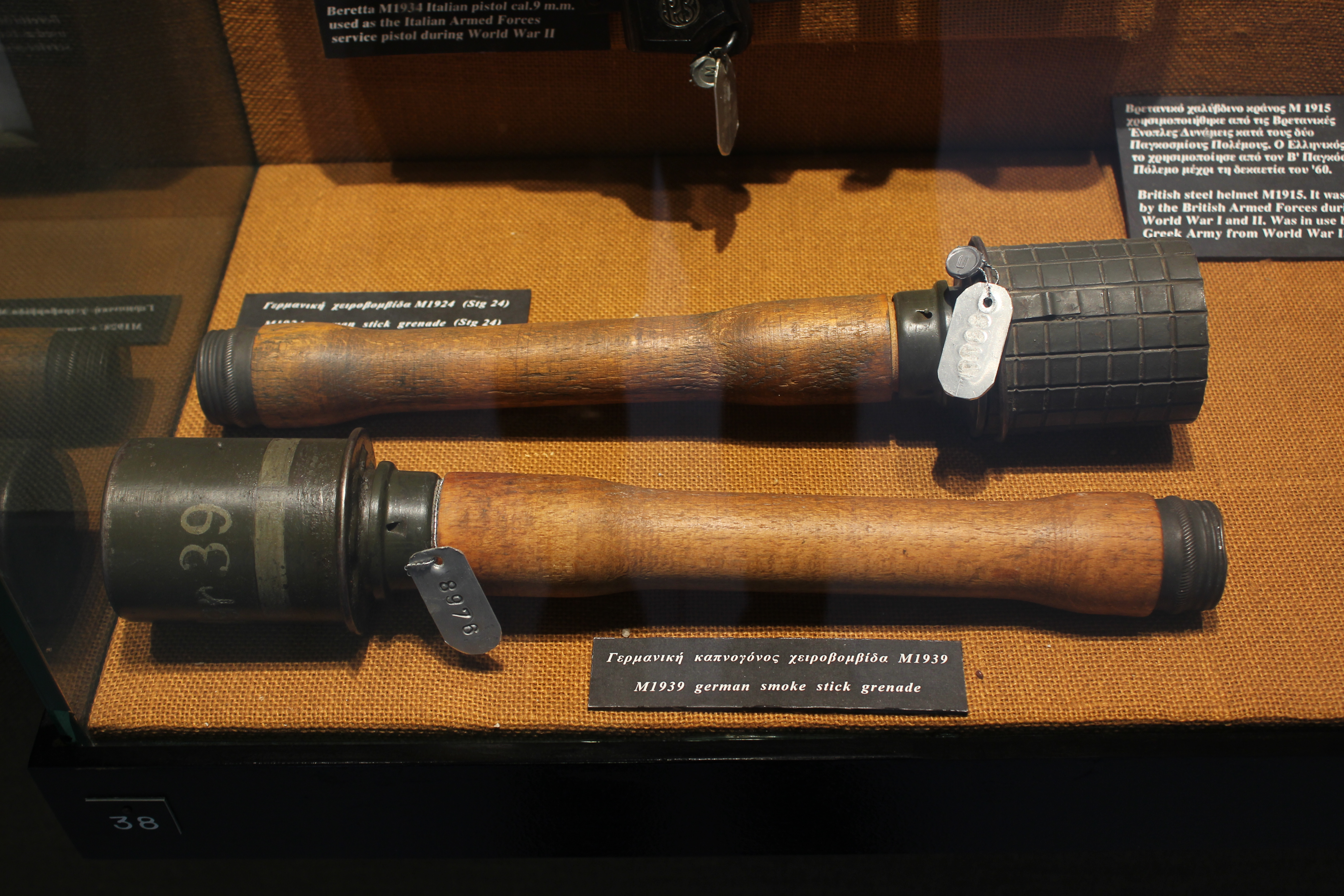
A Stielhandgranate 24 with a splittering sleeve and a Nebelhandgranate 39

- Stielhandgranate 24 − Based on the various WWI Stielhandgranate models, it had a 70 mm (2 3/4 in) steel head painted field gray fitted to a hollow wooden handle containing the fuse and detonator. A pull cord tied to a porcelain bead and protected by a screw cap was pulled to initiate the 4 1/2 second timer. The 360 mm (14 in) grenade carried a 170 g (6 oz) of TNT explosive filler. In 1942, a clip-on fragmentation sleeve (Splittering) was added. For operations in the Eastern Front, a special filler was used to ensure detonation under extreme cold conditions: these grenades in particular were marked with the letter 'K' (German: Kalt, lit. 'Cold'). Due shortages of raw materials during WWII, black powder saw limited use as the warhead filler
- Stielhandgranate 43 − A Stielhandgranate 24 substitute, the warhead had the fuse of the Model 39 grenade screwed on top of it while the handle was made of solid wood
- Nebelhandgranate 39 − Smoke grenade containing a mixture of powdered zinc and hexachloroethane released through eight holes located at the base of the warhead which also had a thin white band painted for identification
- Nebelhandgranate 39B − Virtually identical to the Nebelhandgranat 39, but with raised ridges on the handle and thicker white band

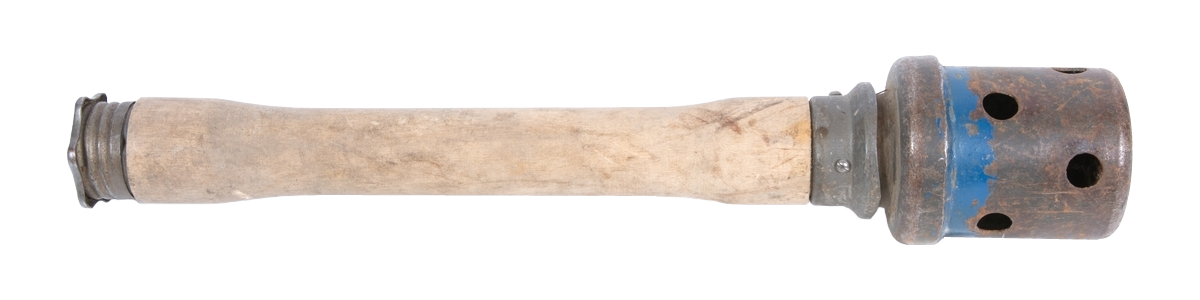
A Swedish Übungs-Stielhandgranate 24 (övningshandgranat m/39)

- Übungs-Stielhandgranate 24 − Dummy grenade with a small black powder charge for practice. It can be distinguished by the bright-red perforated warhead.
- Behelfs Handgranate Holz − A last-ditch grenade, it externally resembles a Stg 24, but entirely of wood. It relied on its blast effect alone
- Behelfs Handgranate Beton − A Stg 24 with a concrete warhead 13 mm (0.51 in) thick filled with approximately 100 g (3.5 oz) of explosives, it was first observed by Allied forces during the North African campaign

=== China ===
- Gongxian Pattern Grenade − A direct copy of the Stg. 24, appearance-wise it was identical, but the warhead was made of cast iron while the filler was a mixture of TNT and potassium nitride, resulting in a weaker blast effect
- Shanxi Pattern Grenade − A copy with different size and shape, but essentially the same as the Gongxian Pattern
- Jinglin Pattern Grenade − Another copy with different size and shape, but essentially the same as the Gongxian Pattern

=== Sweden ===
- Spränghandgranat m/43 − All-metal grenade featuring a more rounded warhead and other minor modifications

== Users ==
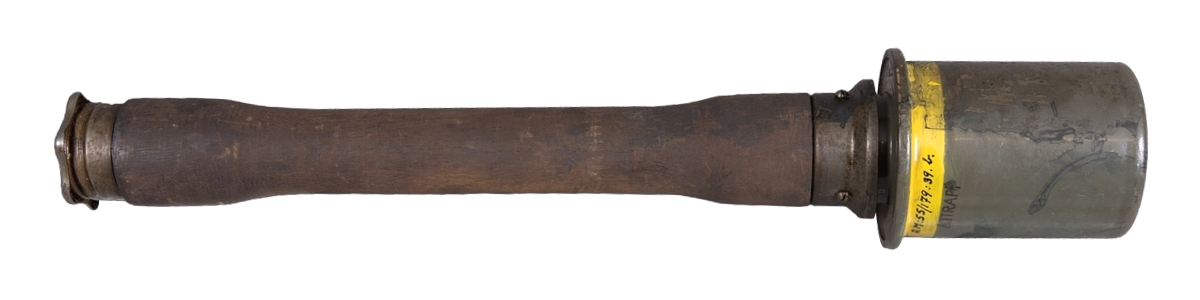
A Swedish Stielhandgranate 24 (spränghandgranat m/39)

- China − Used by German-trained divisions
- Independent State of Croatia
- Finland
- Germany
  - Nazi Germany
- Kingdom of Hungary
- Italian Social Republic − Also used by the Italian resistance
- Netherlands − Issued to collaborators or captured by the Dutch resistance
- Soviet Union − Captured grenades were used by partisans
- Sweden − Used under the designation spränghandgranat m/39, also produced locally as the spränghandgranat m/39B and m/39C

== See also ==
- Model 39 grenade – German "egg" type hand grenade
- RGD-33 grenade – Early WWII Soviet stick grenade
- Splitterring – A fragmentation sleeve for the M24 and M43
- Spränghandgranat m/43 – Swedish derivative
