= Satchel charge =

Thrown explosive combat device

A satchel charge – or bundle charge, for improvised forms – is a demolition device, primarily intended for combat, whose primary components are a high explosive charge (such as TNT or a more potent C-4 plastic explosive), a carrying device (primarily a satchel, but also a messenger bag, a wicker basket, a wooden handle, etc.), and an initiator (such as a fuse attached to a non-electric detonator). The term covers both improvised and formally designed devices.

== Uses ==
In World War I German troops used wired-together bundles of "stick" grenades against French and English tanks, and also as makeshift aeronautical bombs.

In 1936, Finnish Captain Kaarlo Tuurna improved the German version, designing a satchel charge for issue to Finnish troops, known as "Kasapanos". These devices were usually very basic, consisting of a TNT charge packed inside a sheet metal box, combined with a wooden handle and a fuse system much like that of a stick grenade; the handles and fuses varied from charge to charge, as different factories had their own systems. Many versions were also improvised by soldiers in the field, thus adding to the range of variation. The factory-made charges were produced in three sizes ranging from 2 kg to 4 kg (4.4 to 8.8 lb) of TNT. These charges, along with Molotov cocktails, were then used during the Winter War and the Continuation War, to compensate for the shortage of conventional anti-tank weapons.

In World War II, combat engineers used satchel charges to demolish heavy stationary targets such as rails, obstacles, blockhouses, bunkers, caves, and bridges. The World War II–era United States Army M37 Demolition Kit contained eight blocks of high explosive, with two priming assemblies, in a canvas bag with a shoulder strap. Part or all of this charge could be placed against a structure or slung into an opening (such as a pillbox embrasure). It was usually detonated with a pull igniter. When used as an anti-tank weapon, charges were sufficient to severely damage the tracks. 4 kg (8.8 lb) charges were enough to destroy medium tanks.

Wehrmacht soldiers also used satchel charges as improvised solutions to destroy armored structures and vehicles. They employed the Stielhandgranate for the purpose, which was called the Geballte Ladung (lit. 'Interconnected charge'). The heads of a number of M24 grenades – their handles and fuzes removed – would be strapped around a complete grenade, usually with simple rope, cloth, or metal wire, a solution initially invented during World War I using M15, M16 and M17 grenades. These "bundle charges" could be crafted with up to six additional heads around the complete grenade, the most common styles being the addition of four or six M24 heads. During the early years of World War II, there was little in terms of truly effective German handheld weaponry designed to fight hard targets such as armored vehicles and structures, and even later in the war this style of bundle grenade remained useful to the common Heer infantryman.

Later in the Vietnam War, Viet Cong and North Vietnamese soldiers assigned elite sappers to stealthily penetrate defenses of sites controlled by enemy forces. Often, this meant using satchel charges as well as Bangalore torpedoes to blast through barbed wire entanglements, minefields, structures, and other fortifications.

The later U.S. M183 Demolition Charge Assembly contained 20 lb (9.1 kg) of C-4 in each satchel, and could be used with a timed fuse. In the Second Battle of Fallujah in Iraq, U.S. M2 20 lb assault demolitions were used to collapse houses being used as fighting positions by insurgents.

Modified anti-tank mines have been used as satchel charges, as in the case of the Soviet TM-62 landmine.

Some special forces may use customized satchel charges designed to destroy their specific mission's target.

== Gallery ==
Improvised Finnish Kasapanos satchel charge

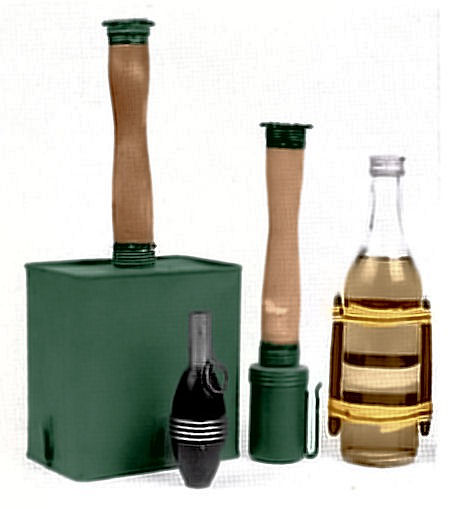
Weapons used in the Winter War; the factory-made Finnish satchel charge is on the left

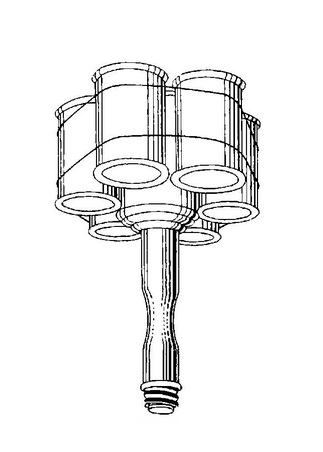
German bundle charge design for the Stielhandgranate 24

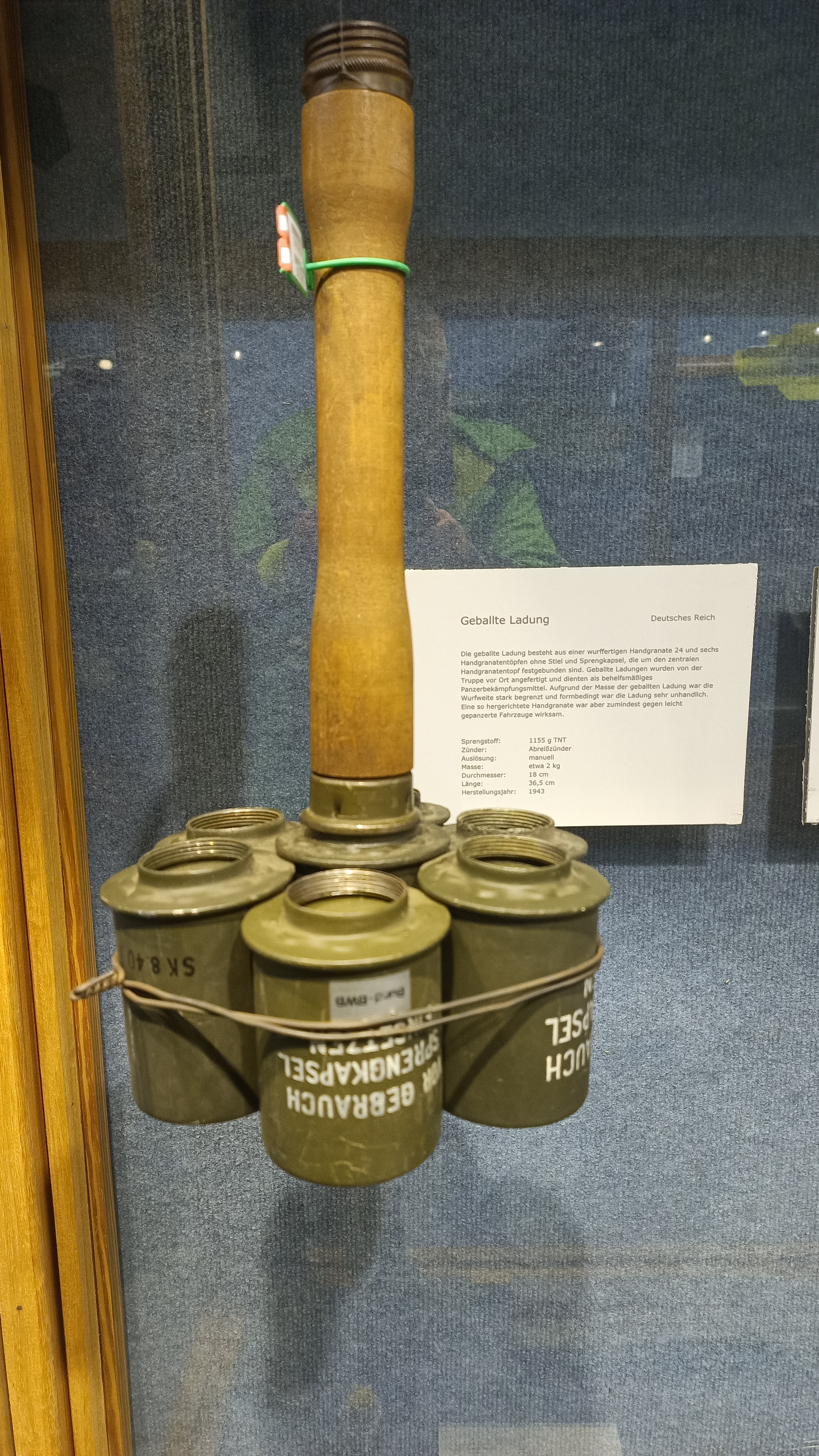
German Geballte Ladung (interconnected charge)

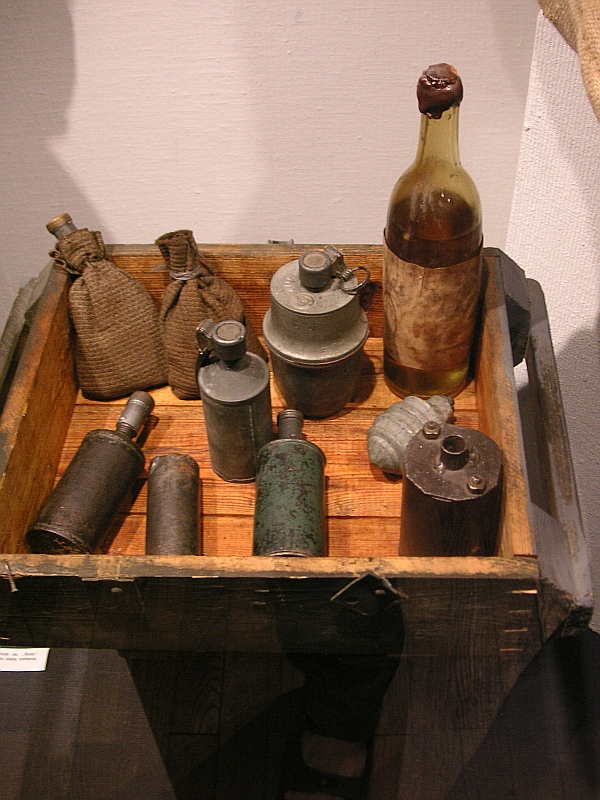
Two small Polish improvised satchel charges along with Sidolówka grenades and a Molotov cocktail, as used in the Warsaw Uprising

Improvised Viet Cong satchel charge

U.S. M37 Demolition Charge Assembly (satchel charge)

U.S. M183 Demolition Charge Assembly (satchel charge)

== See also ==
- Door breaching
- Petard
- Bangalore torpedo
