= Bangalore torpedo =

Explosive charge to clear obstacles

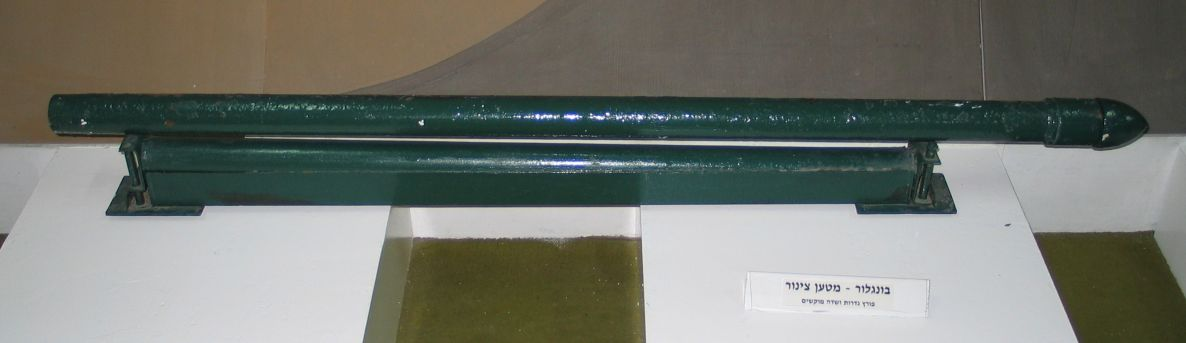
- Type: Explosive charge
- Place of origin: British India

Service history
- In service: 1914–present
- Wars: World War I; World War II; Korean War; Vietnam War; Yom Kippur War; War in Afghanistan; Russian Invasion of Ukraine

Production history
- Designer: Captain R. L. McClintock
- Designed: 1912
- Produced: February 1943 – November 1944 (M1A1)
- No. built: Approximately 3,255,000 torpedo sections (M1A1)
- Variants: M1 Bangalore Torpedo series, Advanced Performance Bangalore Torpedo (L26A1 Bangalore Torpedo Demolition Charge), Bangalore Blade, F60 Bangalore Torpedo

Specifications
- Mass: 13 lb (5.9 kg) per torpedo section (M1A1)
- Length: up to 15 m (49 ft) in 1.5 m (4.9 ft) sections (general), 5 ft (1.5 m) (M1A1)
- Diameter: 2.125 in (54.0 mm) (M1A1)
- Filling: TNT, 80–20 TNT and ammonium nitrate (M1A1), C4 (modern production)
- Filling weight: 9 lb (4.1 kg) per torpedo section (M1A1)
- Detonation mechanism: Detonator
- References: Catalogue of Standard Ordnance Items, Second Edition 1944, Volume III, p. 598

A Bangalore torpedo is an explosive charge placed within one or several connected tubes. It is used by combat engineers to clear obstacles that would otherwise require them to approach directly, possibly under fire. It is sometimes colloquially referred to as a "Bangalore mine", "banger" or simply "Bangalore" as well as a pole charge.

Per United States Army Field Manual 5-250 section 1–14, page 1–12 "b. Use. The primary use of the torpedo is clearing paths through wire obstacles and heavy undergrowth. It will clear a 3- to 4-metre wide path through wire obstacles."

== Overview ==
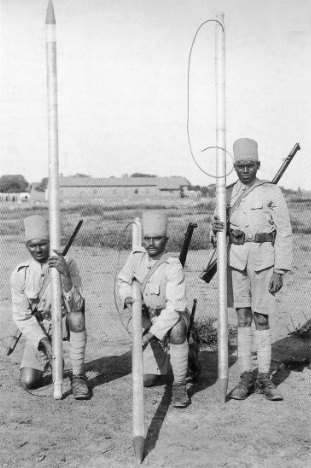
Madras Sappers and Miners with Bangalore torpedoes, 1916

The Bangalore torpedo was devised by Captain R. L. McClintock of the Royal Engineers while attached to the Madras Sappers and Miners unit of the Indian Army at Bangalore, India, in 1912. He invented it as a means of blowing up booby traps and barricades left over from the Second Boer War and the Russo-Japanese War. The Bangalore torpedo could be exploded over a mine, without a sapper having to approach closer than about 3 m (10 ft).

Bangalore torpedoes were manufactured until 2017 by Mondial Defence Systems of Poole, UK, for the UK and US armed forces. An improved version called the Advanced Performance Bangalore Torpedo (APBT) was developed by Chemring Energetics UK, part of the Chemring Group, in response to a British Ministry of Defence (MOD) requirement issued in 2008. The APBT was chosen by the MOD following competitive performance trials and is used by the militaries of Australia, the Netherlands, and New Zealand. They were used during the Afghanistan War for actions such as clearing mines or razor wire.

== In World War I ==
In World War I the Bangalore torpedo was primarily used for clearing barbed wire before an attack. It could be used while under fire, from a protected position in a trench. The torpedo was standardized to consist of a number of externally identical 1.5 m (5 ft) lengths of threaded pipe, one of which contained the explosive charge. The pipes would be screwed together using connecting sleeves to make a longer pipe of the required length, somewhat like a chimney brush or drain clearing rod.

A smooth nose cone was screwed on the end to prevent snagging on the ground. It was pushed forward from a protected position and detonated, to clear a 1.5 m (5 ft) wide hole through barbed wire. During the 1917 Battle of Cambrai, British Royal Engineers used them as diversions to distract the enemy from where the real battle was to be fought.

== In World War II ==
Explosives and Demolitions: Bangalore Torpedoes (1944) De-classified U.S. Army Bangalore high-explosives combat engineer training film reel.

The Bangalore torpedo was used in the British offensive on Bardia during the Western Desert campaign, on 3 January 1941.

The Bangalore torpedo was later adopted by the U.S. Army during World War II, as the "M1A1 Bangalore torpedo". Bangalore torpedoes were packed in wooden crates that contained ten torpedo sections, ten connecting sleeves, and one nose sleeve. The total weight of a crate was 176 pounds (80 kg). Each torpedo section was 5 feet (1.5 m) long, 2.125 inches (54.0 mm) in diameter, and weighed 13 pounds (5.9 kg).

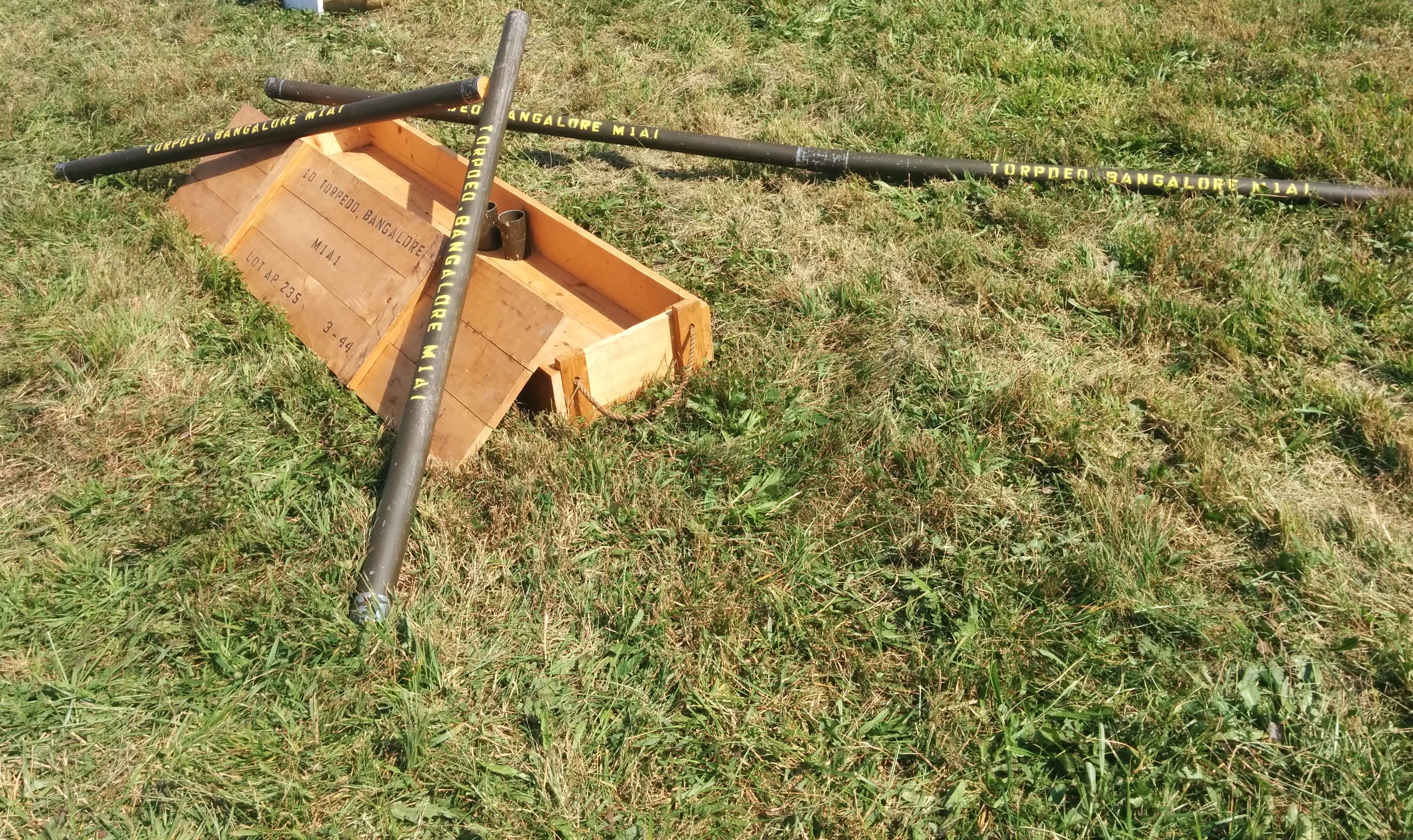
Four pieces of an M1A1 Bangalore torpedo: two individual pieces, and two attached together.

Each end of the torpedo was filled with 4 inches (100 mm) of TNT booster, while the middle section contained an 80–20 amatol mixture. The explosive charge weighed about 9 pounds (4.1 kg). Each end of the torpedo had a recess to accommodate a standard Corps of Engineers blasting cap. Torpedo sections could be attached together via spring-clip-equipped connecting sleeves. A blunt nose sleeve was provided so that the assembled torpedoes could be pushed through obstacles or across terrain without getting stuck.

Wehrmacht soldiers also used satchel charges as improvised solutions to destroy armored structures and vehicles. They employed the Stielhandgranate for the purpose, which was called the gestreckte Ladung (lit. 'Elongated Charge'),

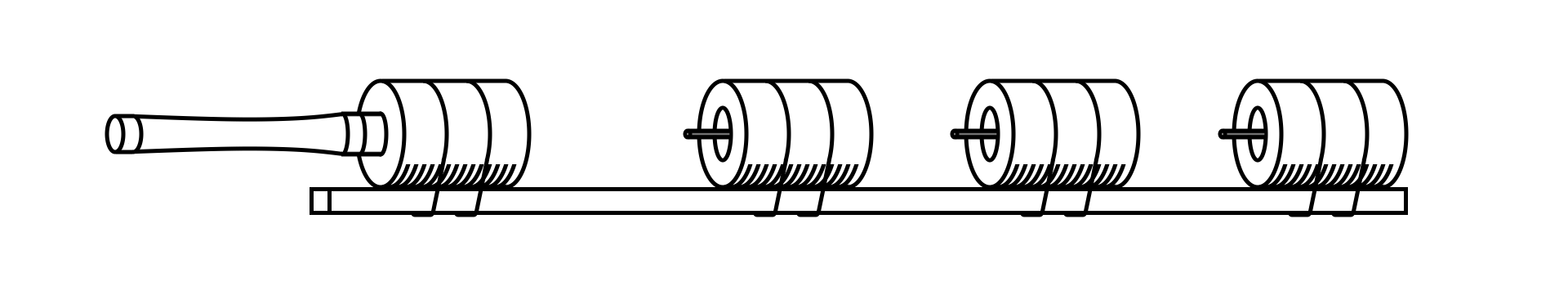
Improvised Bangalore torpedo using the Stielhandgranate 24.

The Stielhandgranate have had their handles and fuses removed and replaced with detonators – mounted to a long stick or plank behind one another with a complete grenade at one end to initiate the explosion.

== Post–World War II development ==
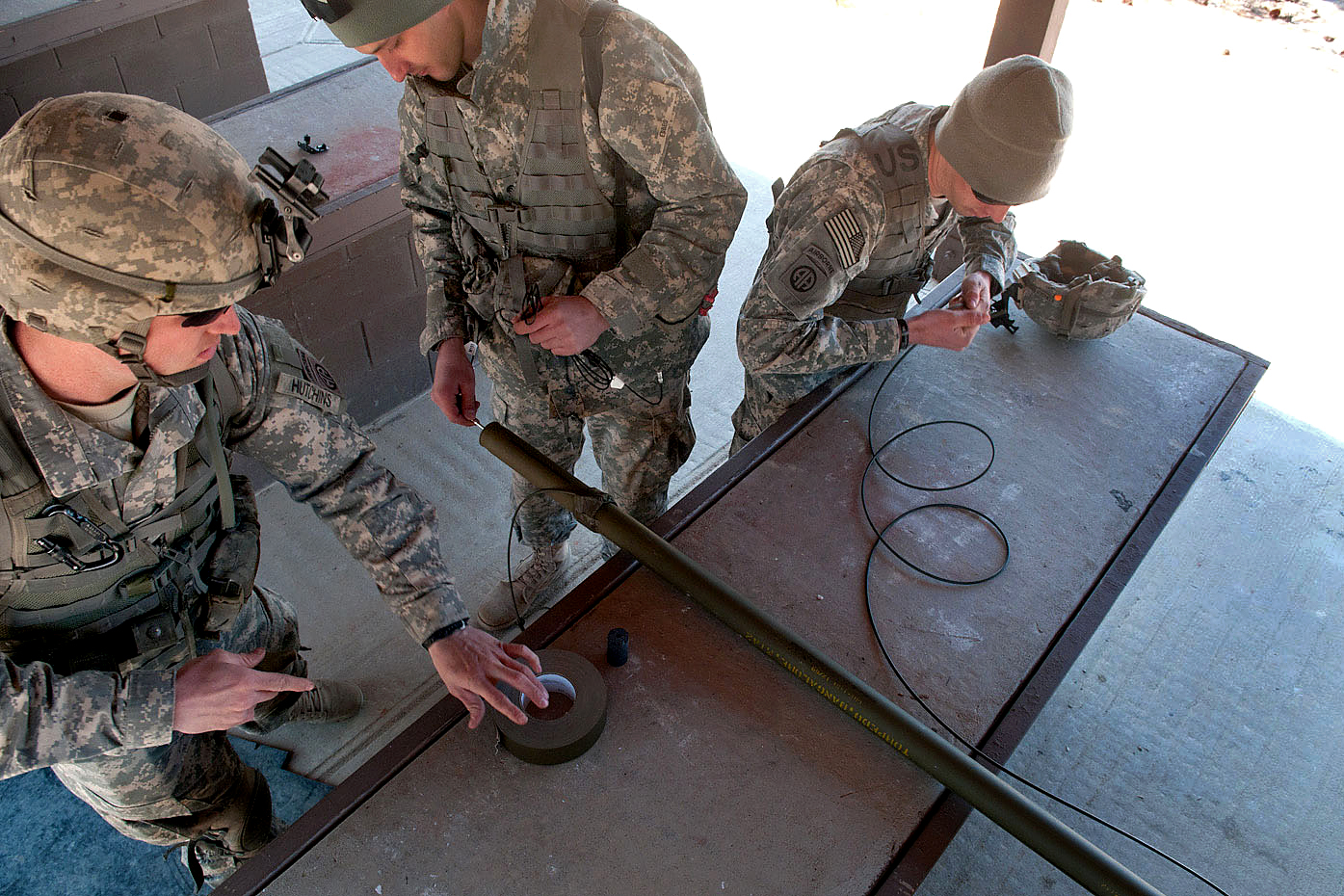
82nd Airborne combat engineers, Fort Bragg, 2011

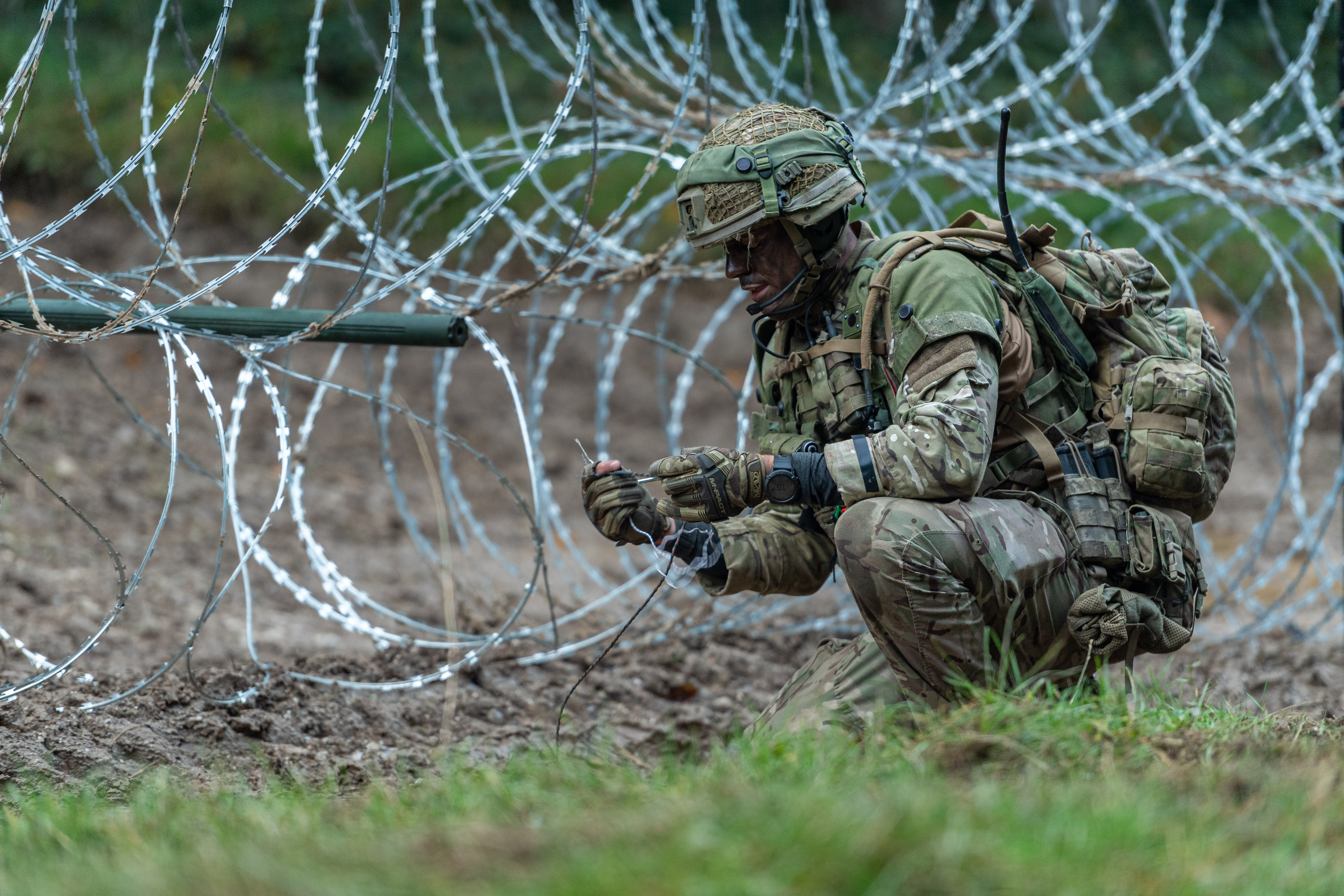
23 Engineer Regiment soldier preparing L26A1 Bangalore Torpedo Demolition Charge

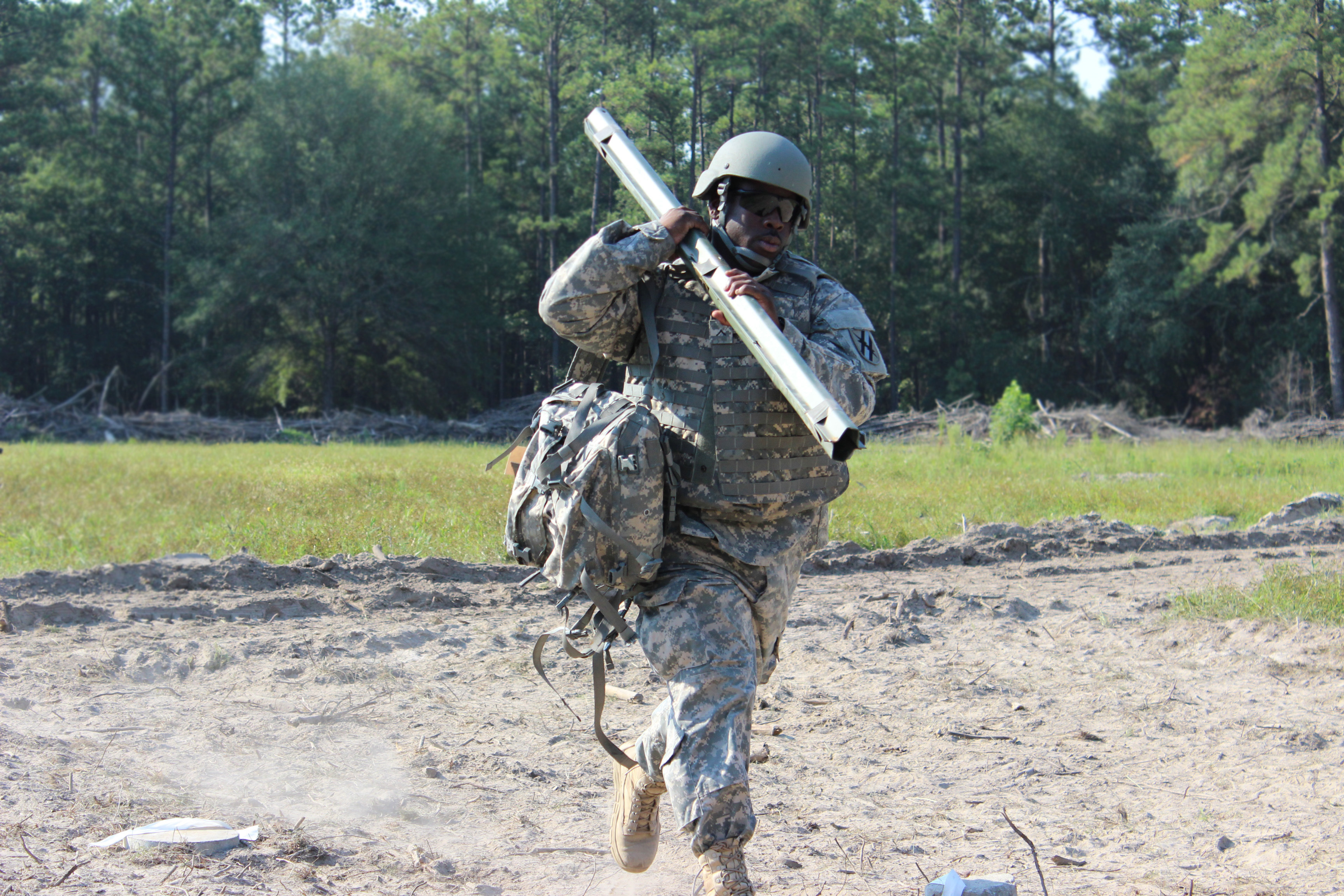
US soldier carrying a section

During the First Indochina War, the Viet Minh produced Bangalore torpedoes. The U.S. Army and the People's Army of Vietnam used the Bangalore torpedo during the Vietnam War; and this war, Viet Cong locally made bangalore torpedo.

During the Yom Kippur War in 1973, Bangalore torpedoes were used by the Israelis to clear paths through Syrian minefields.

Bangalore torpedoes continue to be used today in the little-changed M1A2 and M1A3 versions of the United States Armed Forces, and the modified Advanced Performance Bangalore Torpedo version of the British Armed Forces and Australian Defence Force, under the L26A1 designation which is also used by Chemring, primarily to breach wire obstacles.

Combat engineers have been known to construct similar field versions of the Bangalore by assembling segments of metal picket posts and filling the concave portion with plastic explosive (PE). The PE is then primed with detonating cord and a detonator, and pickets are taped or wired together to make a long torpedo, producing fragments (aka "shrapnel") that cut the wire when detonated. This method produces results similar to the standard-issue Bangalore, and can be assembled to the desired length by adding picket segments.

Newer Bangalore variants include the Alford Technologies Bangalore Blade and the Chemring Advanced Performance Bangalore Torpedo (APBT), with both developed in the United Kingdom. The Bangalore Blade is made from lightweight aluminium and is configured as a linear explosively formed projectile (EFP) array capable of cutting wire obstacles, which earlier Bangalore variants were incapable of breaching effectively. The improvements introduced with the Bangalore Blade give the charge a cutting action as well as a blasting effect.

In a test detonation conducted on the television show Future Weapons, the Bangalore Blade blasted a gap roughly five meters wide in concertina wire, and created a trench deep enough to detonate most nearby anti-personnel mines. Alford Technologies' web page for the Bangalore Blade cites additional trial detonations involving two identical triple-razor wire entanglements erected between steel pickets. A Bangalore torpedo conforming to the original design cleared a three-metre path, while the Bangalore Blade cleared a ten-metre path.

The Advanced Performance Bangalore Torpedo uses an aluminium body and is filled with two kilograms of DPX1 high density pressed explosive. A unique and patented design feature is incorporated which, in combination with the DPX1 explosive, provides enhanced blast and fragmentation effects which provide an enhanced cutting capability against both simple and complex wire entanglements. The APBT is capable of cutting through up to six millimetres of steel plating.

Up to eight APBTs can be combined with one another, with the resulting assembly capable of defeating obstacles that are up to eight metres in length. The quick-turn thread used for this purpose has been designed for ease of assembly when contaminated with sand, soil, or mud while being strong enough to ensure reliable deployment of connected charges without inadvertent decoupling. The APBT has an improved Insensitive Munition signature compared to preceding in-service designs.

The U.S. Anti-Personnel Obstacle Breaching System (APOBS) is being brought into service as a replacement to the Bangalore for path-clearing due to its ease of use, effectiveness, and flexibility – it can clear a path several times longer than the Bangalore torpedo.

== Users ==
- Austria-Hungary
- Australia
- Canada
- China
- Finland
- German Empire
- India
- Israel
- Empire of Japan – Used by the Imperial Japanese Army and Special Naval Landing Forces
- Pakistan
- Philippines
- Singapore
- Soviet Union
- Ukraine
- United Kingdom
- United States
- North Vietnam

== See also ==
- Satchel charge
- Canadian pipe mine
- Mine-clearing line charge
