= Nitrolite =

Older form of powdery high explosive

Nitrolite is an older form of powdery high explosive with an ammonium nitrate base, mixed with a smaller amount of TNT and nitroglycerin etc. It is used for mining, construction as well as military purposes. During World War II it came to be a budget replacement for more expensive TNT.
