= Type 98 grenade =

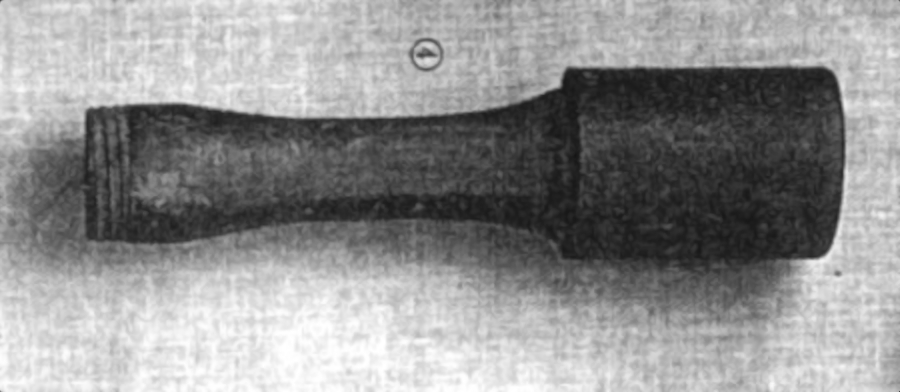
- Type 98 grenade
- Type: Hand grenade
- Place of origin: Empire of Japan

Service history
- Wars: Second Sino-Japanese War; World War II

The Type 98 stick hand grenade (九八式柄付手榴弾, Kyūhachi-shiki etsuki teryūdan) was a fragmentation stick grenade deployed by the Imperial Japanese Army during World War II.

== History ==
In 1938, the Imperial Japanese Army copied the Chinese Stielhandgranate 24 and produced them at a Japanese factory in Manchuria (then Japanese Manchukuo).

== Design ==
The weapon operated identically to the Chinese versions of the German Model 24 stick grenade, which had been encountered in the Second Sino-Japanese War. It was based on these grenades, except that a pull ring was attached to the igniting cord, and the actual fuse delay itself was reduced to four to five seconds (varying from grenade to grenade).

The explosive charge contained 3 oz (85 g) of picric acid (a cheaper and more powerful but less safe explosive than TNT). The Type 98 is much smaller than the Model 24 and the charge is less than half from the same grenade.

Like the Chinese grenades, it was a crude copy of the Model 1924 and a number of issues plagued its effectiveness.

== Users ==
- Empire of Japan: Imperial Japanese Army.

== Bibliography ==
- Rottman, Gordon L. (2009). World War II Axis Booby Traps and Sabotage Tactics. Oxford: Osprey Publishing. ISBN 978-1846034503.
- Rottman, Gordon L. (2015). The Hand Grenade. Oxford: Osprey Publishing. ISBN 978-1472807359.
