= Splitterring =

Accessory for German WWII grenades

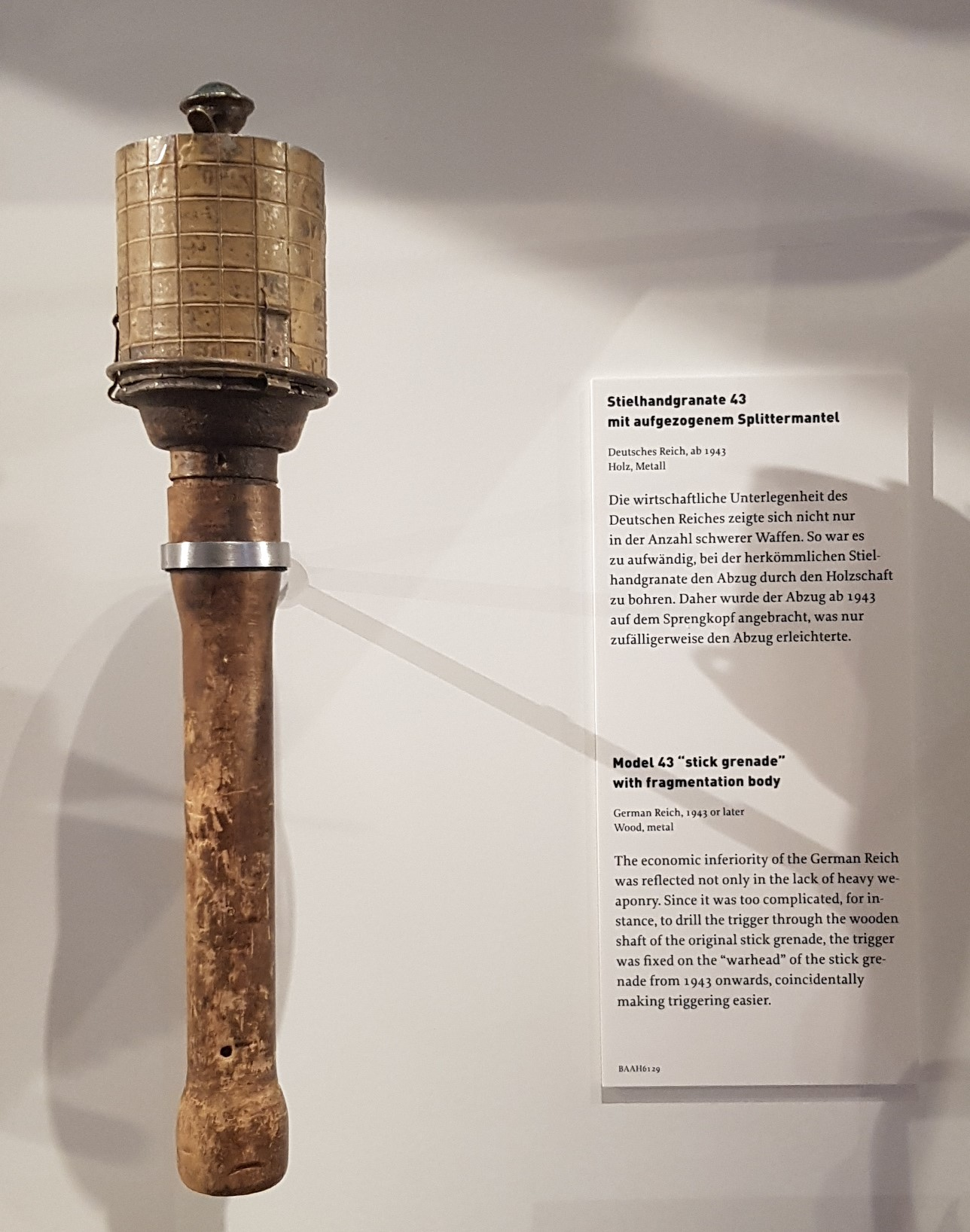
Stielhandgranate 43 with Splitterring mounted

The Splitterring (German compound combining Splitter (splinter or fragment) and Ring (ring)) was a fragmentation sleeve for the M24 and M43 stick grenades, developed by the Heer in 1942. German stick grenades had only a thin steel casing surrounding the explosive charge, which relied principally on blast for effect; the addition of a Splitterring gave it greatly increased anti-personnel fragmentation ability.

A Splitterring was also developed for the never issued Panzerfaust 150 anti-tank weapon late in World War II. Combined with a time delay detonation of the Panzerfaust 150's projectile, it enabled the weapon to achieve air bursts above troops' positions.

== Background ==
Concussion grenades are best used in enclosed spaces such as buildings or bunkers, which contain the blast for maximum effect; anti-personnel fragmentation grenades are designed to be effective against personnel in the open. The Splitterring was a simple cylindrical steel sleeve, with either a smooth or serrated surface, clipped in place over the head of a stick grenade with three keepers around the base, and secured with a tension ring. This easy modification allowed a single type of grenade to be manufactured and carried by soldiers, whereas other nations often produced separate types of concussion and anti-personnel grenades.

A similar sleeve was fitted as a standard item to the Soviet RGD-33 Grenade.
