= Model 39 grenade =

1939 German fragmentation hand grenade

Eihandgranate Model 39
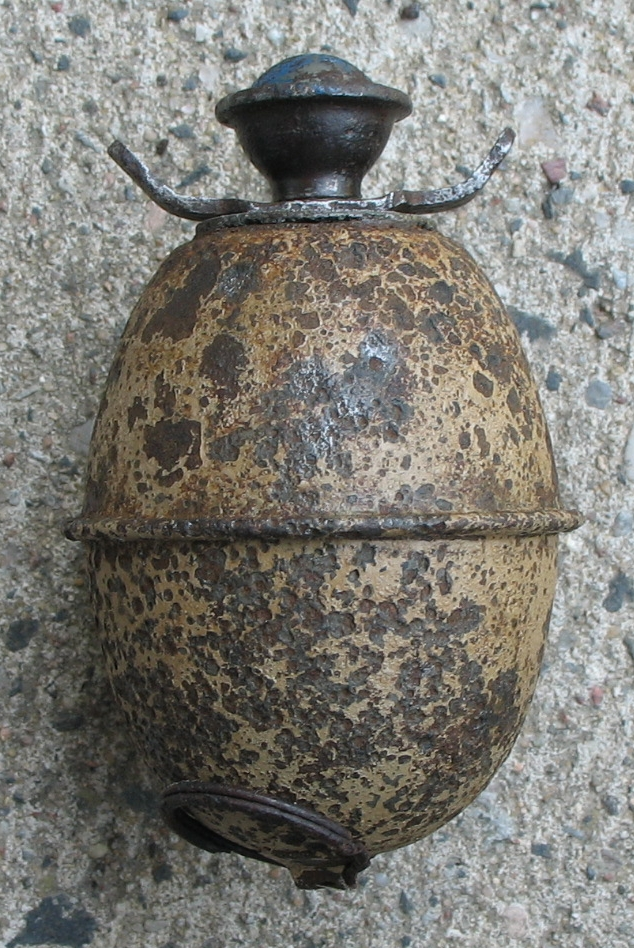
- Eihandgranate Model 39 with remnants of desert paint
- Type: Grenade
- Place of origin: Nazi Germany

Service history
- In service: 1939–1945
- Wars: World War II

Production history
- Designed: 1939
- Variants: Standard, fragmentation sleeve

Specifications
- Mass: 200 g (7.1 oz)
- Height: 76 mm (3.0 in)
- Diameter: 60 mm (2.4 in)
- Filling: Donarit - (relatively similar to amatol)
- Filling weight: 112 g (4.0 oz)
- Detonation mechanism: instant, 1, 4.5, 7.5 or 10 second delay

The Model 39 "Eihandgranate", M39, Eierhandgranate 39 (lit. 'Egg hand grenade 39') was a German fragmentation hand grenade introduced in 1939.

== Design ==
The grenade used the same fuse assembly (the BZE 39) as the Model 43 Stielhandgranate (lit. 'Stick grenade'), which was screwed into the top of the sheet-metal body.

To activate, the dome-shaped cap was unscrewed and pulled with a coiled pull-cord that is pulled before throwing. The color of the cap indicated the burning time of the type of fuze fitted.

Typically, a delay of around four seconds was used. It could also be used in place of the bottom side screw cap on the "Stielhandgranate" stick grenades.

If it was to be used as a fixed booby-trap, then an instantaneous or one-second fuse would be fitted.

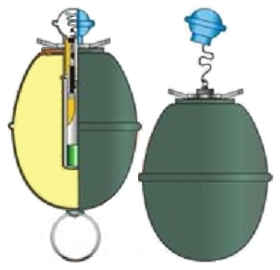
Diagram

The offensive high explosive version of the grenade used a small Donarit filling, which was considered extremely ineffective in comparison to the standard stick grenade models: large amounts of these grenades would be thrown in a short amount of time or at once for the desired effect.

The defensive fragmentation version of the grenade had a fragmentation sleeve wrapped around the exterior of the grenade, which would turn into high speed fragments when the grenade exploded, giving it a longer range and greater damage ability to the enemy but also include the thrower in the danger zone.

=== Fuse cap colour-codes ===
Colour	Delay	Notes
Red	1 second	For coloured smoke, but also booby-trap
Blue	4.5 second	Standard issue
Yellow	7.5 seconds	Used on the Hafthohlladung 3 – magnetic shaped charge
Grey	N/A	Used for demolition work or as booby-trap

=== Usage as booby traps ===
In the Eastern Front, it was frequently reported that German soldiers often left grenades fitted with instant fuzes to make them detonate in the hand of Soviet troops that attempted to make use of captured grenades.

M39 grenades were used in France as part of Erwin Rommel's asparagus.

Obstacles, such as wooden poles, were used to hinder airborne landings, which could tear the wings of gliders and kill the soldiers inside, as these poles were connected with wires to either these grenades or S-mines (Bouncing Betty) against paratroopers.

Later in Italy they were used as booby traps to slow down Allied advances on the Italian peninsula, in ambushes or in street fighting and as traps for the Italian Partisans when they raided German supplies and weapon caches.

Another type of trap was to wire a short-fuse grenade to a door-frame in an abandoned building with the pull-cord attached to the door. When the door was breached by opposing troops, the grenade would detonate right next to the enemy.

== Deployment ==
The Eihandgranate were issued to the Fallschirmjäger from early till the end of the war.

Sometimes, M39s were discarded in plain view for the enemy to use, particularly on the Eastern Front and in the Western Front.

84.2 million Eihandgranates were produced until the end of World War II and thus in fact being more common than the iconic Stielhandgranate of which 75.5 million were produced.

== Users ==
- Nazi Germany
- Soviet Union

== See also ==
- Stielhandgranate
- Kugelhandgranate

== Literature ==
- Terry Gander, Peter Chamberlain: Encyclopedia of German Weapons 1939–1945. 2nd Release, Special edition. Motorbuchverlag, Stuttgart 2006, ISBN 3-613-02481-0.
- D. Mitev, Bulgarian and German hand grenades – history, development, contemporary state, Vol. 1, 216 pages, ISBN 978-954-629-012-0, Sofia, 2008
