= Panzerwurfkörper 42 =

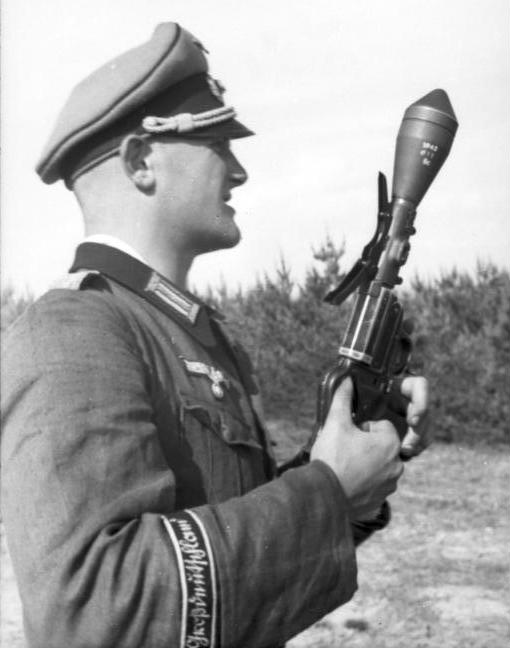
- A Sturmpistole with Panzerwurfkörper 42 grenade.
- Type: HEAT Anti-tank grenade
- Place of origin: Germany

Service history
- Used by: Wehrmacht
- Wars: World War II

Specifications
- Mass: 600 g (1 lb 5 oz)
- Length: 217 mm (8.56 in)
- Diameter: Stem: 22 mm (.875 in); Grenade: 61 mm (2.4 in)
- Maximum firing range: 69 m (75 yd)
- Warhead weight: 60 g (2.1 oz)
- Detonation mechanism: Graze fuze
- Blast yield: 80 mm (3.1 in) of RHA

The Panzerwurfkörper 42 was a HEAT grenade that was developed by Germany and used by the Wehrmacht during World War II. The Panzerwurfkörper 42 was designed to be fired from a flare gun.

== Design ==
The Panzerwurfkörper 42 was an anti-tank grenade that could be fired from the Leuchtpistole 34, Leuchtpistole 42, or Sturmpistole giving German troops a small and lightweight anti-tank weapon for engaging enemy armor from close range which could not be engaged satisfactorily by infantry weapons or artillery without endangering friendly troops.

The Panzerwurfkörper 42's layout was similar to the Wurfkorper 361 its primary components were a nose cap, internal steel cone, steel upper body, steel stem, rifled driving band, explosive filling, and a graze fuze. The Leuchtpistole was a break action gun and a rifled brass or aluminum shell casing containing propellant was first pushed into the breech of the gun. Next, the grenade and the stem was inserted into the muzzle of the gun and the driving band screwed into the rifling of the shell casing. The gun was then closed and the hammer cocked for firing.

When the gun fired the stem and grenade were forced from the barrel. Upon hitting the target the graze fuze in the base of the grenade ignited the explosive filling which collapsed the internal steel cone to create a superplastic high-velocity jet to punch through enemy armor. Since HEAT weapons rely on chemical energy to penetrate enemy armor the low velocity of the grenade did not adversely affect penetration. A downside of the Panzerwurfkörper 42 was its short range of 69 m (75 yd) and could only penetrate 80 mm (3.1 in) of RHA.

== See also ==
- Gewehrgranaten-Buchsen
- ZK 424
