= Fallschirm Leuchtpatrone =

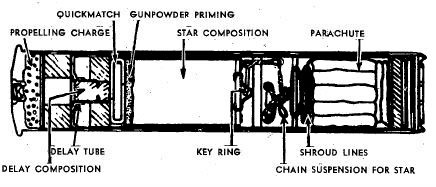
- A schematic of components.
- Type: Star shell
- Place of origin: Germany

Service history
- Used by: Wehrmacht
- Wars: World War II

Specifications
- Diameter: 25 mm (1 in)
- Warhead: Parachute retarded illumination flare
- Detonation mechanism: Delay fuze

The Fallschirm Leuchtpatrone or "parachute light cartridge" in English was a non-lethal star shell that was developed by Germany and used by the Wehrmacht during World War II. The Fallschirm Leuchtpatrone was designed to be fired from a Kampfpistole flare gun.

== Design ==
The Fallschirm Leuchtpatrone was a rifle grenade that could be fired from the Kampfpistole. The Kampfpistole was a rifled single-shot break action gun and the cartridge was breech loaded. The Kampfpistole was a rifled variant of the earlier Leuchtpistole 34. The purpose of the Fallschirm Leuchtpatrone was for battlefield illumination with a secondary signal flare role. The projectile had a light alloy shell case, with a threaded insert in the base for a percussion cap, inside the case was a propelling charge, delay fuze, parachute, illumination star, and bakelite nose cone. When fired the percussion cap ignited the propellant, which in turn ignited the delay fuze, that ignited the illumination star, blew off the bakelite nose cone, and ejected the star. The star is then suspended by a chain from a parachute, illuminating the area below. The projectile can be identified by the stenciling "F. Leucht. Z." on the base of the cartridge case.
