= Sprengpatrone =

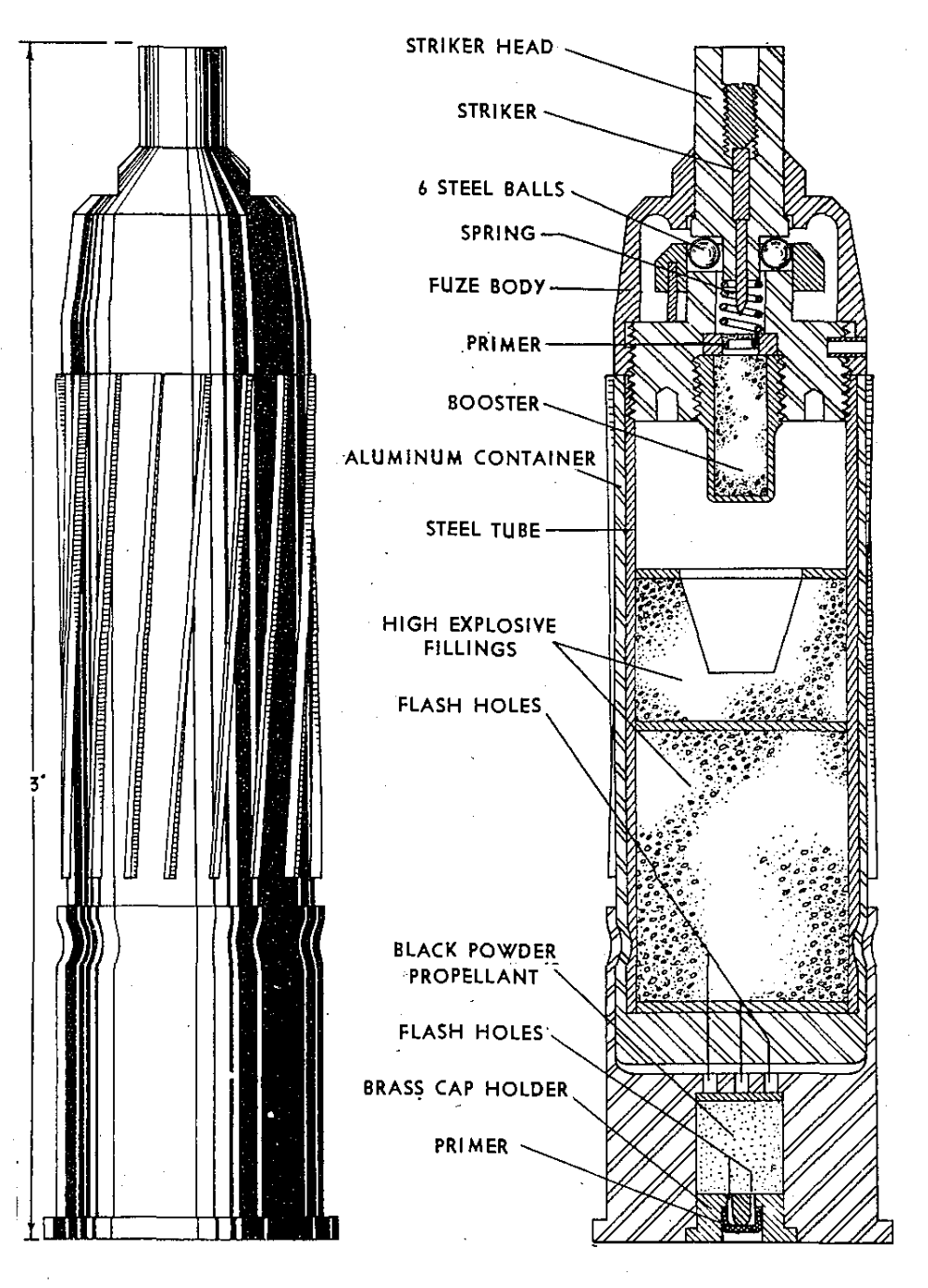
- A schematic of internal components.
- Type: Rifle grenade
- Place of origin: Germany

Service history
- Used by: Wehrmacht
- Wars: World War II

Specifications
- Mass: Complete: 140 g (5 oz); Projectile: 99 g (3.5 oz)
- Length: 76 mm (3 in)
- Diameter: 25 mm (1 in)
- Warhead: PETN
- Warhead weight: 22 g (.77 oz)
- Detonation mechanism: Nose fuze

The Sprengpatrone or "explosive cartridge" in English was a rifle grenade that was developed by Germany and used by the Wehrmacht during World War II. The Sprengpatrone was designed to be fired from a Kampfpistole flare gun.

== Design ==
The Sprengpatrone was a rifle grenade that could be fired from the Kampfpistole. The Kampfpistole was a rifled single-shot break action gun and the cartridge was breech loaded. The Kampfpistole was a rifled variant of the earlier Leuchtpistole 34. The Sprengpatrone was designed to give German troops a small and lightweight grenade launcher for engaging targets from close range which could not be engaged satisfactorily by infantry weapons or artillery without endangering friendly troops. The Sprengpatrone was used for low angle direct fire where range and accuracy were needed. Use beyond 180 m (200 yd) was discouraged due to inaccuracy, as was use less than 46 m (50 yd) due to the risk from shell fragments.

This grenade consists of an aluminum cartridge case, a percussion cap in the center of the base, black powder propellant charge, an internal steel projectile filled with PETN and was topped by a nose fuze. The projectile had a rifled aluminum external sleeve which engages the rifling of the Kampfpistole barrel. The nose fuze contains a striker head that is held away from the detonator by six steel balls kept in position by a steel collar supported by three aluminum pins. A creep spring separates the striker and primer from the booster which is separated from the explosive filling by an empty air space. When the projectile hits the target the nose fuse ignites the primer which in turn ignites the booster and the explosives.
