= Nebelpatrone =

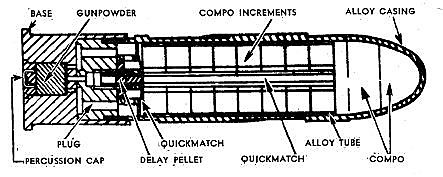
- A schematic of components.
- Type: Smoke grenade
- Place of origin: Germany

Service history
- Used by: Wehrmacht
- Wars: World War II

Specifications
- Diameter: 25 mm (1 in)
- Warhead: Smoke
- Detonation mechanism: Nose fuze

The Nebelpatrone or "fog cartridge" in English was a non-lethal smoke grenade that was developed by Germany and used by the Wehrmacht during World War II. The Nebelpatrone was designed to be fired from a Kampfpistole flare gun.

== Design ==
The Nebelpatrone was a rifle grenade that could be fired from the Kampfpistole. The Kampfpistole was a rifled single-shot break action gun and the cartridge was breech loaded. The Kampfpistole was a rifled variant of the earlier Leuchtpistole 34. The projectile could be recognized by NEBEL. Z. marking on the base of the cartridge case and could be used for target marking or concealment. The Nebelpatrone was similar in appearance and construction to high explosive grenades except that it contained a smoke generator instead of explosives. The projectile consists of a light alloy cartridge case, a percussion cap in the center of the base, propellant, cylindrical light alloy body, smoke compound, powder charge, and nose fuze. The nose fuze is triggered on impact, igniting the powder charge which ignites and ejects the smoke generator from the body of the grenade.
