= Multi-Star Signal Cartridge =

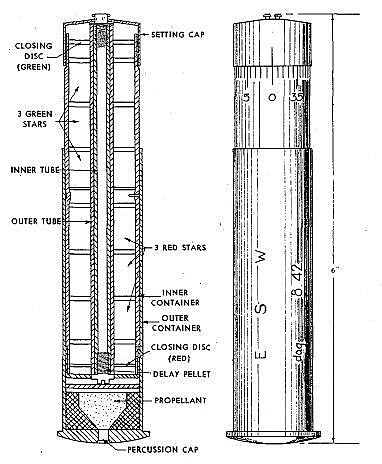
- A schematic of components.
- Type: Signal flare
- Place of origin: Germany

Service history
- Used by: Wehrmacht
- Wars: World War II

Specifications
- Length: 146 mm (5.75 in)
- Diameter: 25 mm (1 in)
- Warhead: 3 red and 3 green stars
- Detonation mechanism: Delay pellet

The Multi-Star Signal Cartridge was a non-lethal signal flare that was developed by Germany and used by the Wehrmacht during World War II. The Multi-Star Signal Cartridge was designed to be fired from a Leuchtpistole or flare gun in English.

== Design ==
The Multi-Star Signal Cartridge was a signal flare that could be fired from the Leuchtpistole 34, Leuchtpistole 42, or Sturmpistole. The Leuchtpistole and Sturmpistole were single-shot break action smoothbore guns and the cartridge was breech loaded. The cartridge consisted of an inner light alloy projectile which contained a total of three red stars and three green stars inside of a light alloy cartridge case with propellant charge. The exterior of the cartridge was engraved with numbers and the projectile could be twisted to create six different number combinations. Each number combination corresponded to a combination of red and green stars. By twisting the projectile a series of ignition holes were either opened or closed. When fired a percussion cap in the base of the cartridge ignited the propellant which in turn ignited a delay pellet in the base of the projectile. Once the delay pellet had burned through it exploded and the flash was channeled through an ignition tube in the center of the projectile igniting and ejecting the stars in sequence.

Number Combination	Red Stars	Green Stars
0-2	3	3
7-8	1	2
14-15	3	1
21-22	1	3
27-29	2	2
34-35	2	1
