= USS Zeilin =

Two ships in the United States Navy have been named USS Zeilin after Brigadier General Jacob Zeilin (1806–1880), the first general officer of the United States Marine Corps, and the seventh Commandant of the Marine Corps (1864–1876).

- USS Zeilin (DD-313) was a Clemson-class destroyer, commissioned in 1920 and decommissioned in 1930.
- USS Zeilin (AP-9) was a troop transport. Originally named SS Silver State, and later SS President Jackson, the ship was acquired by the Navy in 1940. She was renamed Zeilin and commissioned in 1942. She was decommissioned in 1946.
