= Leuchtpistole 42 =

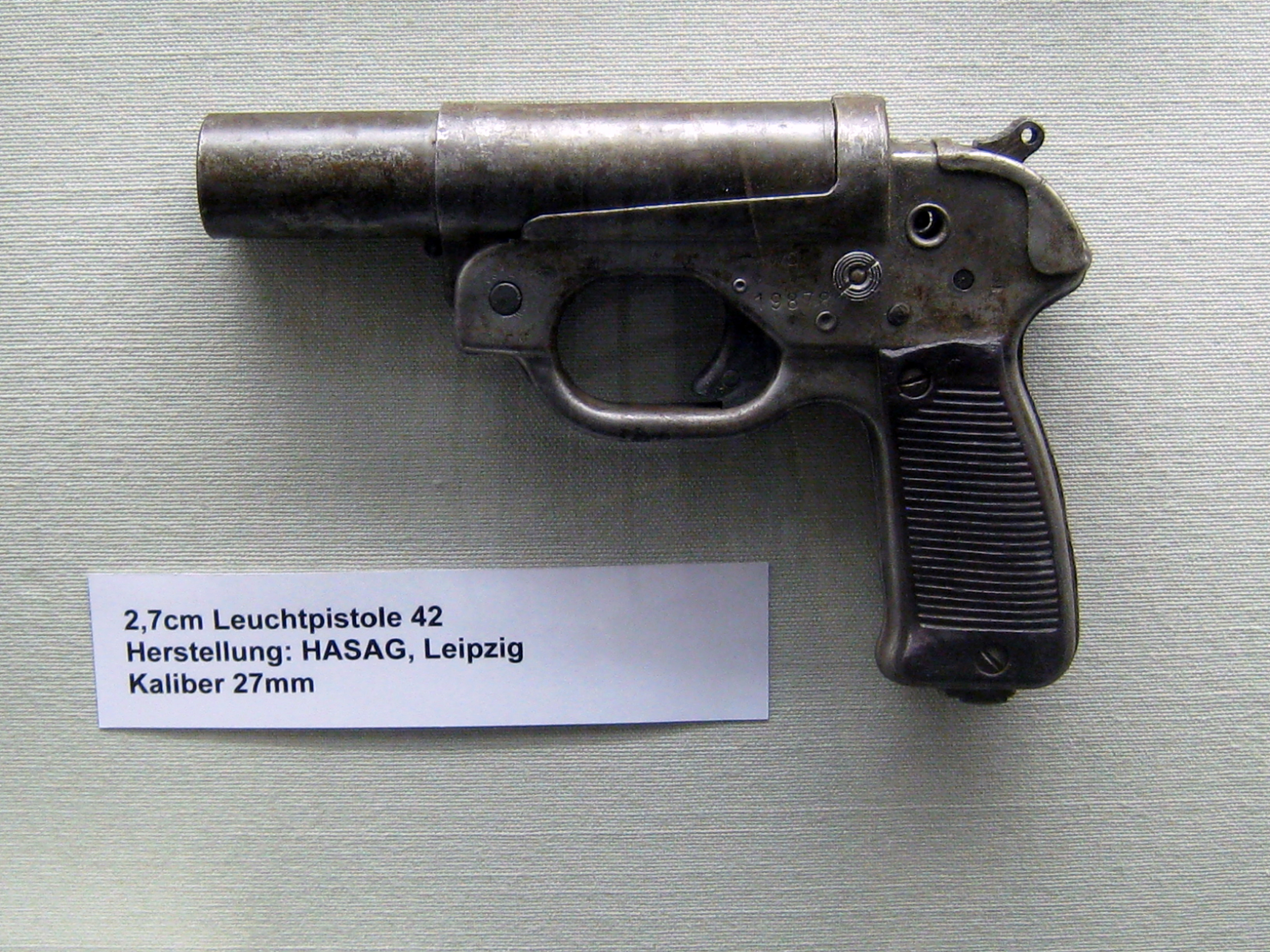
- Leuchtpistole 42.
- Type: Flare gun
- Place of origin: Germany

Service history
- In service: 1943-1945
- Used by: Germany

Production history
- Designer: HASAG
- Manufacturer: HASAG; Metallwarenfabrik C.u.W. Meinel-Scholer; Waffenfabrik Moritz & Gerstenberger

Specifications
- Mass: 1.120 kg (2 lb 7.5 oz)
- Length: 155 mm (6.1 in)
- Cartridge: Flare; Smoke; Panzerwurfkörper 42; Wurfgranate Patrone 326; Wurfkorper 361
- Caliber: 26.6 mm (1.05 in)
- Action: Break action
- Feed system: Single shot

The Leuchtpistole 42 or flare gun in English was introduced into German service in 1943 and served throughout World War II.

== Design ==
The Leuchtpistole 42 was a single shot, break action, smoothbore, flare gun that was a successor to the earlier Leuchtpistole 34. The Leuchtpistole 42 which was made from stamped mild steel components, was galvanized to stop corrosion and used bakelite for the pistol grips. The focus of the Leuchtpistole 42 was to reduce the consumption of light alloys, reduce reliance on machined components, reduce production time, and reduce production costs. Despite being made from mild steel and stamped components it was considered rugged and its rough appearance didn't hinder its functionality. However, the Leuchtpistole 42 was nearly 390 g (14 oz) heavier than its predecessor.

== Variants ==
- Sturmpistole – The Sturmpistole was a conversion of either Leuchtpistole 34's or Leuchtpistole 42's that added a padded buttstock and sights for firing both lethal and non-lethal rounds.

== Ammunition ==
The primary roles for the Leuchtpistole 42 were signaling, illumination, target marking, or concealment with a smoke grenade. Later during World War II, explosive rounds were developed to give German troops a small and lightweight grenade launcher for engaging targets from close range which could not be engaged satisfactorily by infantry weapons or artillery without endangering friendly troops.

Available projectiles included:

- Multi-Star Signal Cartridge – This was a multi-star signal flare that contained three red and three green stars that could be set for six different color combinations.
- Panzerwurfkörper 42 – This was a HEAT grenade that could be used against enemy armor. It had a range of 69 m (75 yd) and could penetrate 80 mm (3.1 in) of RHA. It was similar in layout to the Wurfkorper 361 and used a rifled cartridge case.
- Wurfgranate Patrone 326 – This was a small, breech loaded, fin stabilized, explosive grenade, with a nose fuze that was designed for short range low angle direct fire missions. It was not recommended for use beyond 180 m (200 yd) due to inaccuracy or less than 46 m (50 yd) due to the risk from shell fragments.
- Wurfkorper 361 – The Wurfkorper 361 was formed by screwing a bakelite or wooden stem into an Eierhandgranate 39 which allowed it to be fired from a Leuchtpistole. A brass or aluminum shell casing with propellant was first loaded into the breech of the gun. The stem was then slid down the muzzle until it slipped into the shell casing, the breech was then closed and the gun could be fired. The Wurfkorper 361 was used for high angle indirect fire where its shrapnel would be useful. The Wurfkorper 361 was not recommended for use at less than 46 m (50 yd) due to the risk from shrapnel and its maximum range was limited to around 78 m (85 yd) at 45° because the grenade had a 4.5 second time fuze.

== Gallery ==
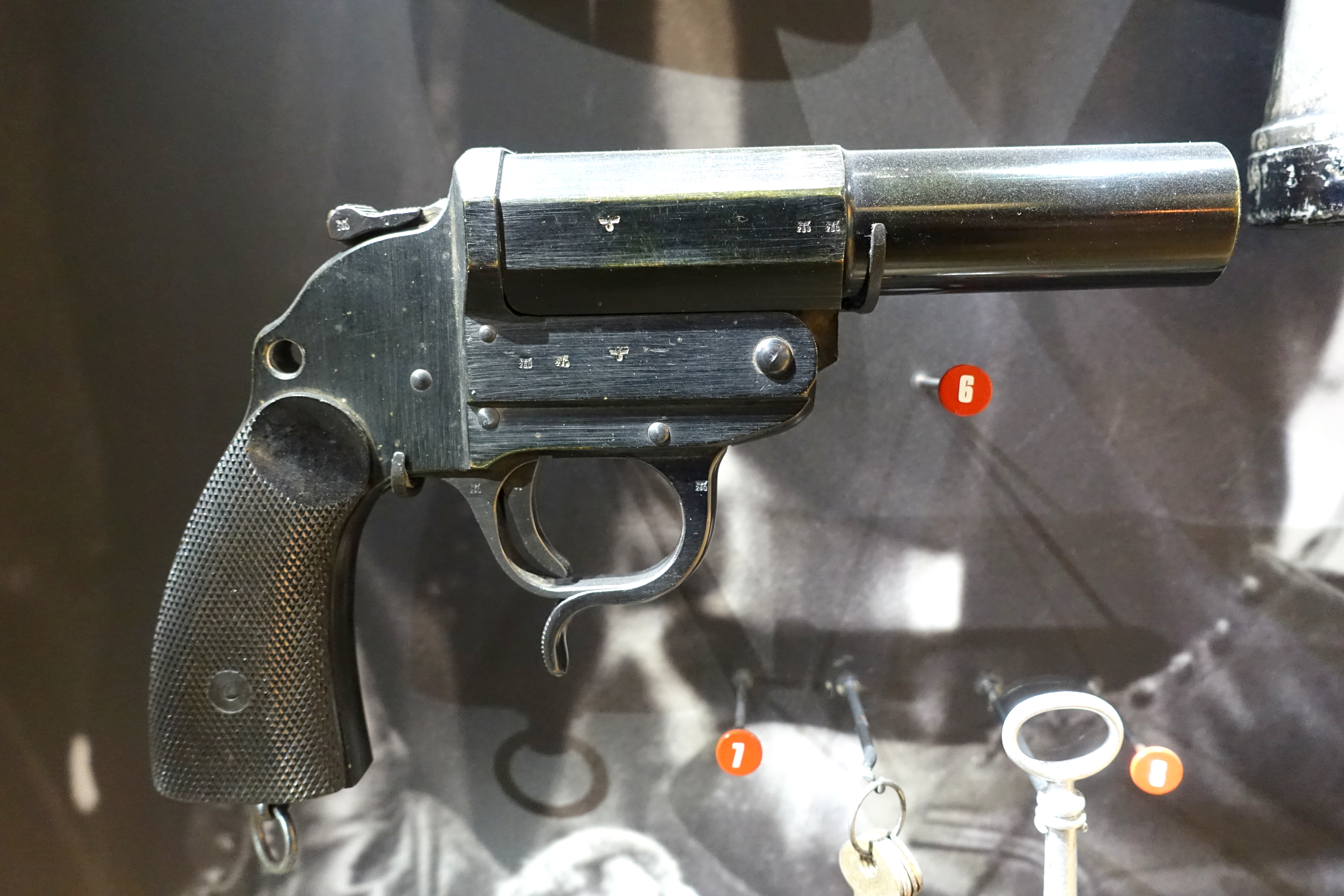
A Leuchtpistole 34 from U-505 at the Museum of Science and Industry Chicago, IL.

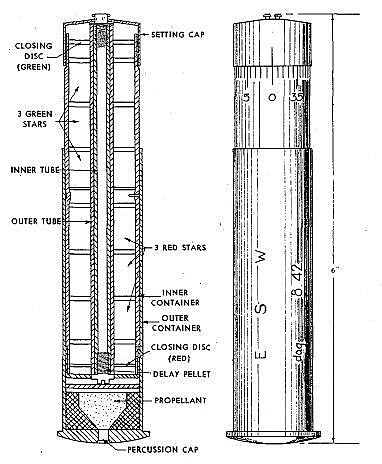
Schematic of Multi-Star Cartridge components.

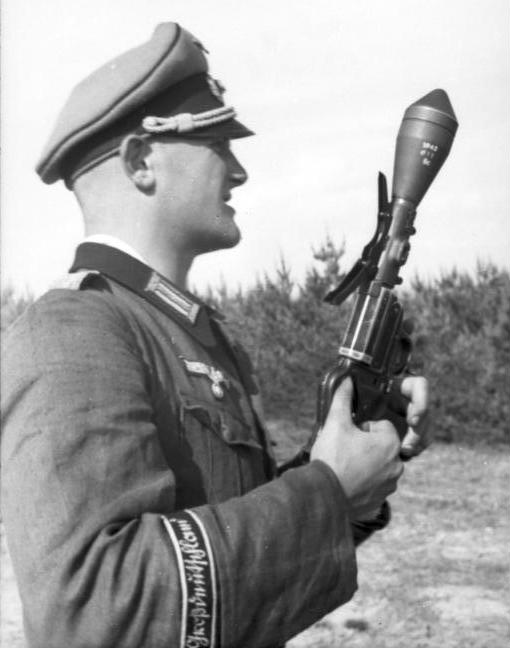
Sturmpistole with Panzerwurfkörper 42.

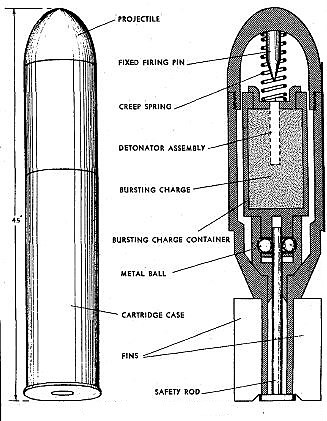
Schematic of Wurfgranate Patrone 326 components.

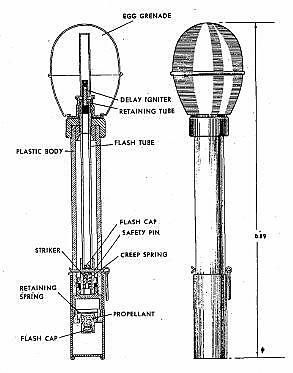
Schematic of Wurfkorper 361 components.Panzerwurfkörper 42.
