= Wurfkörper 361 =

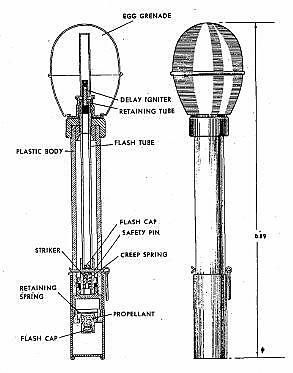
- A schematic of components.
- Type: Rifle grenade
- Place of origin: Germany

Service history
- Used by: Wehrmacht
- Wars: World War II

Specifications
- Mass: 230 g (8.1 oz)
- Length: 180 mm (6.9 in)
- Diameter: Stem: 26 mm (1 in); Grenade: 60 mm (2.4 in)
- Maximum firing range: 78 m (85 yd) at 45°
- Warhead: Amatol
- Warhead weight: 110 g (4 oz)
- Detonation mechanism: 4.5 second time fuze

The Wurfkörper 361 was a grenade that was developed by Germany and used by the Wehrmacht during World War II. The Wurfkörper 361 was designed to be fired from a Leuchtpistole or flare gun in English.

== Design ==
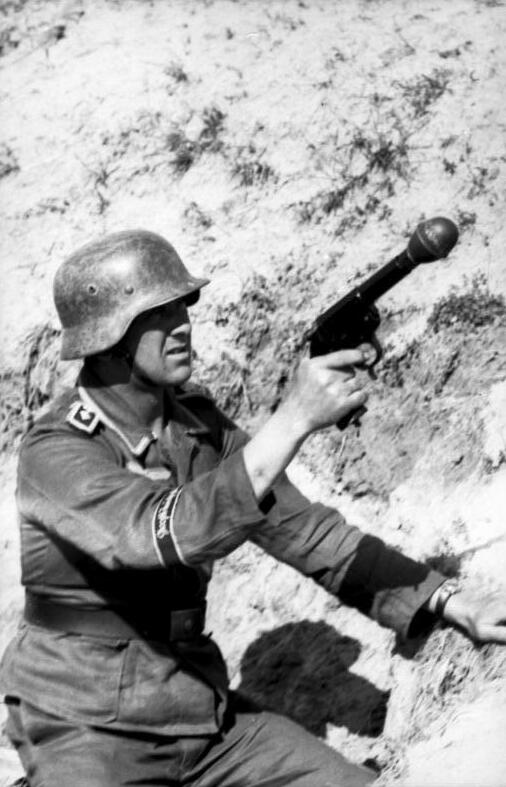
A Sturmpistole with a Wurfkörper 361

The Wurfkörper 361 was a grenade that could be fired from the Leuchtpistole 34, Leuchtpistole 42, or Sturmpistole giving German troops a small and lightweight grenade launcher for engaging targets from close range which could not be engaged satisfactorily by infantry weapons or artillery without endangering friendly troops.

The Wurfkörper 361 grenade was formed by screwing a bakelite or wooden stem into an Eierhandgranate 39 which allowed it to be fired from a Leuchtpistole. Inside the base of the stem, there was a flash cap inside an alloy flash tube which connected to a time fuze in the base of the grenade. The Leuchtpistole was a break action gun and a brass or aluminum shell casing containing propellant was pushed into the breech of the gun. Then the safety pin at the base of the stem was removed arming the grenade and the stem was inserted into the muzzle of the gun until it slipped inside the shell casing. The gun would then be closed and the hammer cocked for firing. When the gun fired the stem and grenade were forced from the barrel and the striker in the base of the stem ignited a flash cap and a jet of flame traveled up the flash tube and ignited the time fuze. Once the time fuze expired the grenade detonated.

The Wurfkörper 361 was considered more effective than the Wurfgranate Patrone 326 due to its larger explosive charge but each grenade had its own mission. The Wurfgranate Patrone 326 was used for low angle direct fire where range and accuracy were needed while the Wurfkörper 361 was used for high angle indirect fire where its shrapnel would be useful. The Wurfkörper 361 was not recommended for use at less than 46 m (50 yd) due to the risk from shrapnel and its maximum range was limited to around 78 m (85 yd) at 45° because the grenade had a 4.5 second time fuze.
