= Sturmpistole =

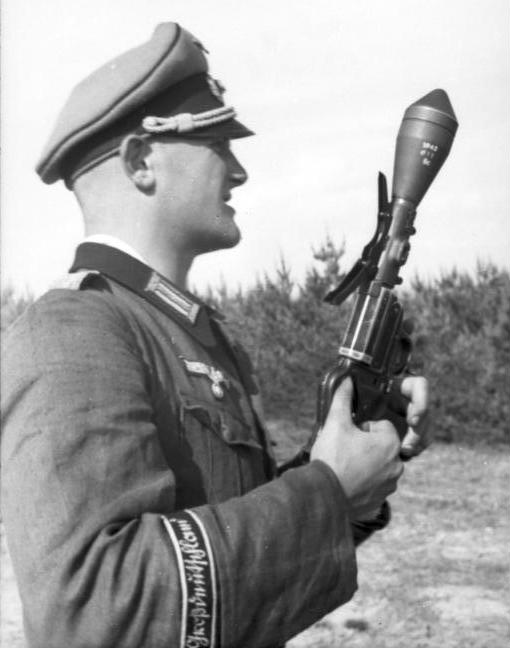
- A Sturmpistole with Panzerwurfkörper 42 being demonstrated to German troops, Russia (1943)
- Type: Flare gun
- Place of origin: Nazi Germany

Service history
- In service: World War II
- Used by: Nazi Germany

Production history
- Manufacturer: Walther; Erma Werke

Specifications
- Mass: 2.5 kg (5 lb 8 oz)
- Length: Butt extended: 584 mm (23 in); Butt folded: 305 mm (12 in)
- Barrel length: 180 mm (7.1 in)
- Cartridge: Flare; Smoke; Panzerwurfkörper 42; Wurfgranate Patrone 326; Wurfkörper 361
- Caliber: 23 mm (0.91 in)
- Action: Break action
- Feed system: Single shot

The Sturmpistole ("assault-pistol") was an attempt by Germany during World War II to create a multi-purpose weapon which could be used by any infantryman. It consisted of a modified flare gun (Leuchtpistole) which could fire a variety of grenades, including a 600 g (1 lb 5 oz) shaped charge Panzerwurfkörper 42 which could penetrate 80 mm (3.1 in) of rolled homogeneous armor. The idea was not pursued wholeheartedly, and took second stage to the then current anti-tank rifles and later weapon developments, such as the recoilless Panzerfaust and Panzerschreck rocket launchers.

== Service use ==
The Sturmpistole was a multi-purpose weapon for signaling, illumination, target marking, or concealment with a smoke grenade. Later during World War II, explosive rounds were developed to give German troops a small and lightweight grenade launcher for engaging targets from close range which could not be engaged satisfactorily by infantry weapons or artillery without endangering friendly troops. Conversions of both the Leuchtpistole 34 and Leuchtpistole 42 flare guns are reported to exist. The conversion included adding a buttstock and sights for the different grenades.

Sturmpistoles delivered to Romania were in use of Pioniere battalions.

Available projectiles included:

- Multi-Star Signal Cartridge – This was a multi-star signal flare that contained three red and three green stars that could be set for six different color combinations.
- Panzerwurfkörper 42 – This was a HEAT grenade that could be used against enemy armor. It had a range of 69 m (75 yd) and could penetrate 80 mm (3.1 in) of RHA at 90 degrees. It was similar in layout to the Wurfkörper 361 and used a rifled cartridge case.
- Wurfgranate Patrone 326 – This was a small, breech loaded, fin stabilized, explosive grenade, with a nose fuze that was designed for short range low angle direct fire use. It was not recommended for use beyond 180 m (200 yd) due to inaccuracy or less than 46 m (50 yd) due to the risk from shell fragments.
- Wurfkörper 361 – The Wurfkörper 361 was formed by screwing a Bakelite or wooden stem into an Eierhandgranate 39 which allowed it to be fired from a Leuchtpistole. A brass or aluminum shell casing with propellant was first loaded into the breech of the gun. The stem was then slid down the muzzle until it slipped into the shell casing, the breech was then closed and the gun could be fired. The Wurfkörper 361 was used for high angle indirect fire where its shrapnel would be useful. The Wurfkörper 361 was not recommended for use at less than 46 m (50 yd) due to the risk from shrapnel and its maximum range was limited to around 78 m (85 yd) at 45° because the grenade had a 4.5 second time fuze.

== Gallery ==
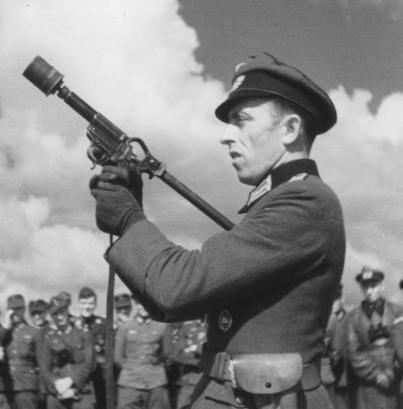
A Sturmpistole firing a HE grenade probably based on the Stielhandgranate 43

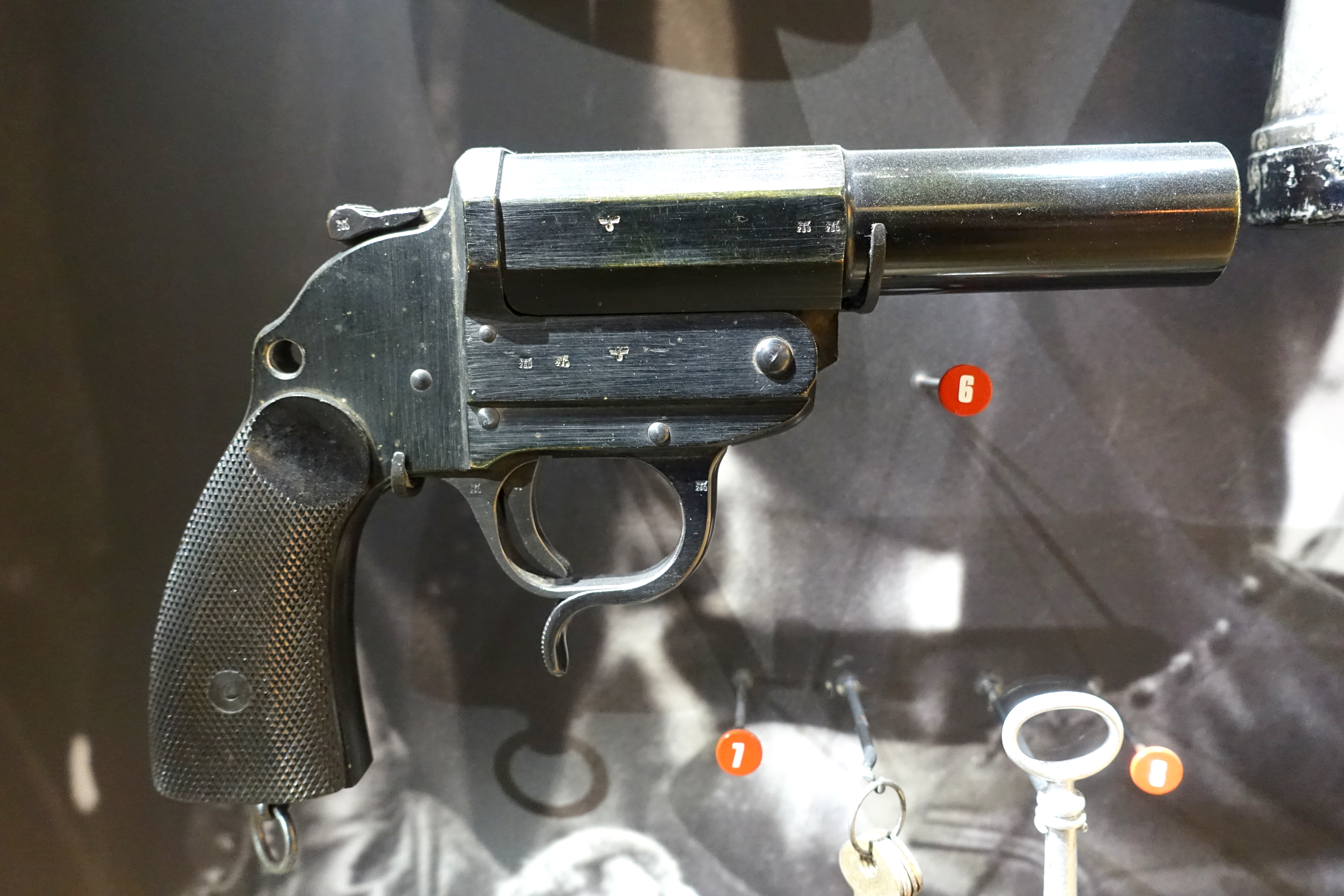
Leuchtpistole 34

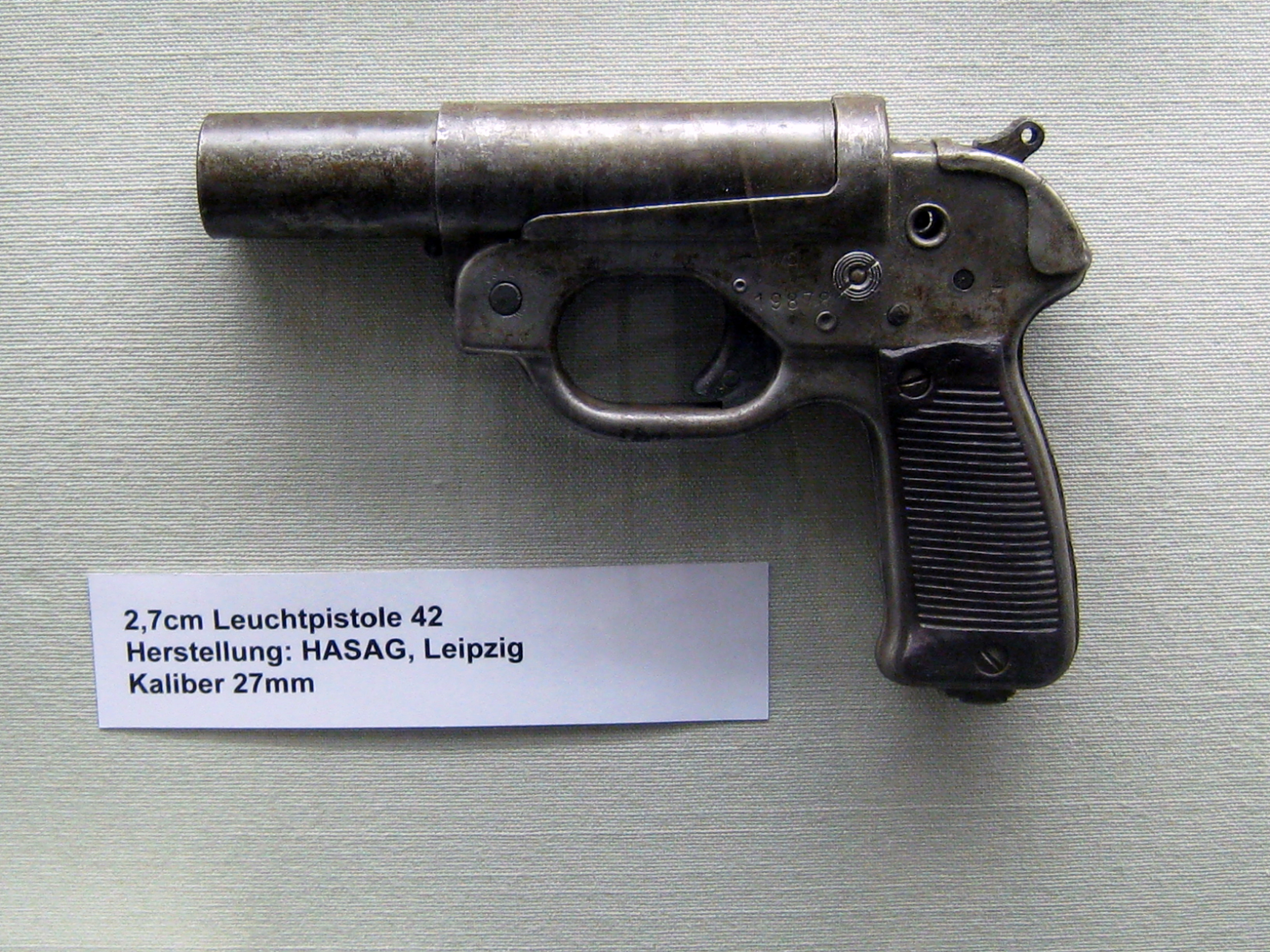
Leuchtpistole 42

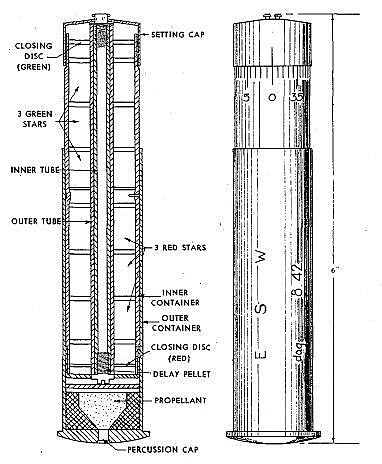
Schematic of Multi-Star Cartridge components

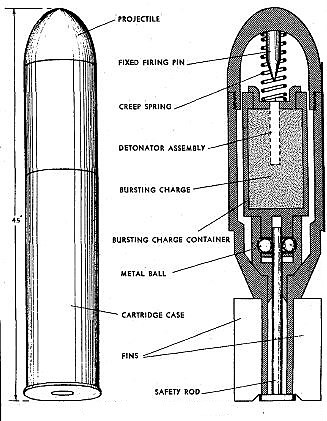
Schematic of Wurfgranate Patrone 326 components

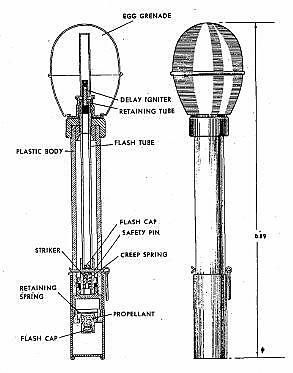
Schematic of Wurfkörper 361 components

== See also ==
- RPG-76 Komar
