= Jacob Zeilin =

United States Marine Corps general (1806-1880)

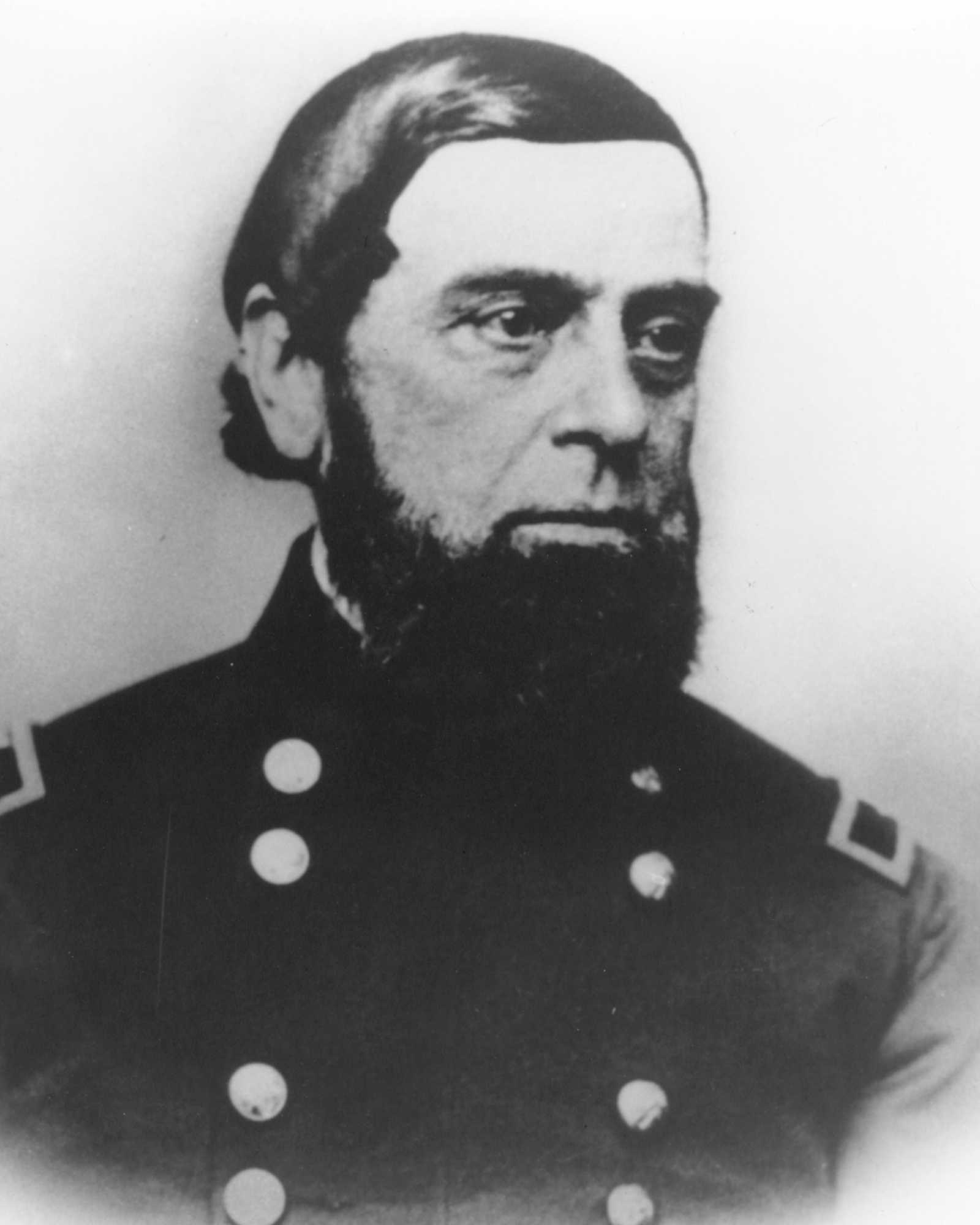
- Born: July 16, 1806; Philadelphia, Pennsylvania, U.S.
- Died: November 18, 1880 (aged 74); Washington, D.C., U.S.
- Burial place: Laurel Hill Cemetery, Philadelphia, Pennsylvania, U.S.
- Military career
- Allegiance: United States
- Branch: United States Marine Corps
- Service years: 1831–1876
- Rank: Brigadier general
- Commands: Commandant of the Marine Corps
- Conflicts: Mexican–American War; Battle of Rio San Gabriel; Siege of Los Angeles; Battle of La Mesa; Bombardment of Guaymas; Battle of San José del Cabo; American Civil War; First Battle of Bull Run (WIA); Second Battle of Charleston Harbor; Atlantic Blockading Squadron

Jacob Zeilin (July 16, 1806 – November 18, 1880) was an American military officer who served as the seventh Commandant of the United States Marine Corps from 1864 to 1876. He served in the United States Marine Corps for over 45 years including in the Mexican-American War, the Perry Expedition, and the American Civil War. He was a brigadier general and led the Marine Corps in the post-Civil War era during governmental defunding of the military. His efforts resulted in the Marines remaining a separate branch of the United States military.

== Early life and education ==
Zeilin was born in Philadelphia on July 16, 1806. He attended the United States Military Academy from 1822 to 1825, but dropped out due to poor grades in philosophy and chemistry.

== Career ==
Zeilin was commissioned in the Marine Corps as a second lieutenant on October 1, 1831. After completing the preliminary training of a Marine officer in Washington, D.C., Zeilin's first tours of duty were ashore at the Marine Barracks, Philadelphia, and at Gosport, Virginia. He first went to sea on board the sloop of war Erie in March 1832, which was followed by a tour of duty at Charlestown (Boston), Massachusetts. In August 1834, he again joined the sloop Erie for a voyage that lasted over three years. He was promoted to first lieutenant on 12 September 1836.

From September 1837 to April 1841, Zeilin again served at Charlestown, Massachusetts, and New York. In February 1842, he returned to sea duty, on board the USS Columbus, and spent several months with the Brazil Squadron. After this tour of sea duty, he served at Marine Corps stations on the east coast from 1842 to 1845, and was transferred to duty aboard the frigate USS Congress of the U.S. Pacific Squadron.

=== Mexican–American War ===
During the Mexican–American War, Zeilin commanded the Marine Detachment assigned to USS Congress, which was attached to Commodore Robert F. Stockton's force. He took part in the Conquest of California and fought in the conquest and occupation of Santa Barbara and San Pedro, as well as the Siege of Los Angeles and the Battle of La Mesa. In December 1846, he participated in the force that rescued troops under Stephen W. Kearny in the San Bernardo hills. He participated in the force led from San Diego by Stockton to decisively defeat the Californios at the Battle of Rio San Gabriel. He was brevetted to major (two grades above his rank at the time) on January 9, 1847, for his actions in that battle.

On 28 January 1847, Zeilin was appointed Military Commandant of San Diego and served in that capacity until the completion of the conquest of California. He was promoted to the regular rank of captain on 14 September 1847 and served as Fleet Marine Officer of the Pacific Squadron. In September 1847, he served during the bombardment of Guaymas and the Battle of San José del Cabo. He fought in several skirmishes with Mexican troops in the Mazatlán area.

=== Interwar period ===
After the war with Mexico, Zeilin proceeded to Norfolk, Virginia, where he served for a time, then to New York. He remained at New York until June 1852. He was selected to accompany Commodore Matthew C. Perry as Fleet Marine Officer in the Perry Expedition to Japan, serving with the Marine Detachment in USS Mississippi. With elaborate ceremonies, the Marines under his command took a prominent part in the expedition. He was the second person to set foot on shore at the formal landing of the naval forces at Kurihama, Yokosuka, Japan on 14 July 1853, and was one of those later accorded special honor for his part in the expedition that opened the doors of Japan to the outside world.

Upon his return from Japan, he was again stationed at Norfolk. This duty was followed by his being placed in command of the Marine Barracks of the Washington Navy Yard. He again went to sea, and served aboard the frigate Wabash, with the European Station, until 1859.

=== American Civil War ===
During the early part of the American Civil War, Zeilin was on garrison duty in command of Marine Barracks at Philadelphia and at Washington, D.C. Five days later, he was appointed to the regular rank of major. On July 21, 1861, he commanded a company of U.S. Marines during the First Battle of Bull Run and was seriously wounded.

In 1863, Zeilin was given command of the battalion of U.S. Marines sent to support the naval force whose mission was the capture of Charleston, South Carolina, but, because of illness, he returned after a few weeks to garrison duty at Marine Barracks, Portsmouth, New Hampshire. Later, he returned to sea, serving with the Atlantic Blockading Squadron under Rear Admiral John Dahlgren. In 1864, Zeilin assumed command of the Marine Barracks at Portsmouth, New Hampshire.

=== Commandant of the Marine Corps ===
On June 10, 1864, he was appointed Commandant of the United States Marine Corps by President Abraham Lincoln. Gideon Wells, the Secretary of the Navy, was unhappy with the senior leadership of the Marines and promoted Zeilin above other officers of higher rank. To prevent disapproval from these officers, Wells ordered all officers with a higher rank than Zeilin into retirement. He was promoted to the rank of brigadier general on 2 March 1867.

After the war, Brigadier General Zeilin successfully defended the Marine Corps against its critics and efforts to defund the Corps. Zeilin recommended against incorporating the Marines into the Navy and his efforts resulted in the Marines remaining a separate branch of the United States military. In 1868, Zeilin approved of the design of the "Eagle, Globe, and Anchor," as the emblem for the Marine Corps. It replaced the previous emblem which was a bugle with a letter "M" in the middle.

Zeilin retired from the Marine Corps on November 1, 1876, after serving over forty-five years as a Marine Corps officer. When considering his time at West Point, he served over 49 years in uniform.

== Personal life ==
Zeilin married Virginia Freeman on October 22, 1845. Together they had one son, William Freeman Zeilin and two daughters, Margaret Freeman Very (wife of Edward Wilson Very) and Anne V. Stockton (wife of one of Senator John P. Stockton's sons).

General Zeilin was a member of the Pennsylvania Commandery of the Military Order of the Loyal Legion of the United States.

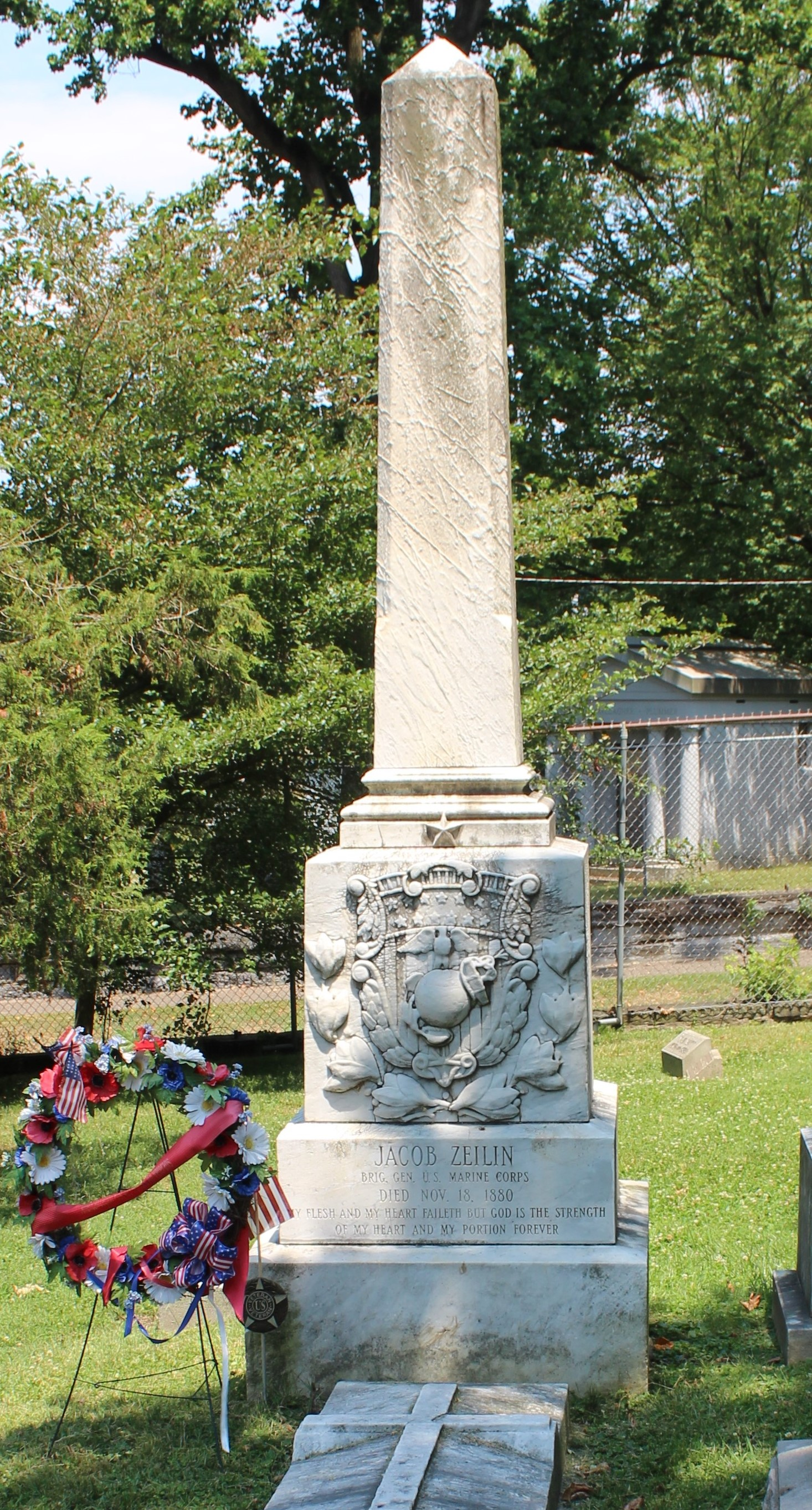
Jacob Zeilin Memorial in Laurel Hill Cemetery

On 18 November 1880, he died in Washington, D.C., and was interred in Laurel Hill Cemetery in Philadelphia.

== Legacy ==
- Two ships in the United States Navy have been named USS Zeilin in his honor: USS Zeilin (DD-313) in 1920 and USS Zeilin (AP-9) in 1942.
- He is the namesake for Zeilin Road, on Marine Corps Base Quantico in Virginia.
- He is the namesake for Zeilin Street, on Marine Corps Base Camp Pendleton in California.

Military offices
Preceded by Col. John Harris	Commandant of the United States Marine Corps; 1864–1876	Succeeded by Col. Charles G. McCawley
