= Edward Wilson Very =

United States Navy officer

- Born: October 26, 1847; Belfast, Maine
- Died: March 1, 1910 (aged 62); New York City, New York
- Education: United States Naval Academy
- Military career
- Allegiance: United States
- Branch: United States Navy

Edward Wilson Very (October 26, 1847 – March 1, 1910) was a United States Navy officer who adopted and popularized a single-shot breech-loading snub-nosed flare gun that fired flares that bear his name (Very lights). During his naval career he captained a gunboat off the shores of Japan, held positions in engineering, naval ordnance, artillery and signal staff postings and saw diplomatic service with the U.S. Legation in Paris.

== Early life and education ==
Very was born in Belfast, Maine, and, at the age of 15 1/2, was admitted to the U.S. Naval Academy from the Washington Territory. His was the first appointment ever issued from that territory. He entered the academy in February 1863. He was granted a leave of absence in June 1864 for active service during the Civil War. From June 7, 1864, until the end of July 1864, he served on the USS Agawam at Dutch Gap on the James River. He was then transferred to the steamer Gettysburg, where he participated in the blockade of Wilmington, North Carolina. He returned to the academy that October to complete his studies, graduating on June 7, 1867.

== Military career ==
Following graduation, Very served his first midshipman tour briefly on the USS Michigan. He then saw service with the Asiatic Squadron aboard the USS Piscataqua from September 1867 to July 1868, and then on the USS Oneida. In January 1869, he received his commission as an ensign and was ordered to the USS Idaho in May. In August, he was ordered to the USS Monocacy, where he received his Masters commission in December. In February 1870, he received orders to the USS Delaware.

In December 1870, he received orders to service with the European Squadron, serving brief tours on the USS Franklin and USS Richmond. In May 1871, he was transferred to the USS Shenandoah, remaining with the squadron until 1874. He was promoted to lieutenant in September 1871. During his time in Europe, he witnessed Marshal MacMahon's march into Paris to quell the Paris Commune.

In February 1874, he was ordered to ordnance duty at the Washington Navy Yard. He served four months with the Panama Interoceanic Canal Survey from December 1874 until returning to the Ordnance Bureau in mid-April 1875. In June, he received orders to the Navy's Torpedo Station, where he eventually commanded the experimental battery there. From January 9 to February 14, 1878, he served on the USS Constitution, when he was ordered to special ordnance duty in Europe. Beginning in February 1878, he was in charge of naval ordnance matters placing him with top European military and armaments officials while in Paris until 1881.

After serving on the Naval Advisory Board from 1881 to 1883, Very was assigned to special duties abroad. He resigned from the U.S. Navy, effective April 30, 1885, and took positions at the Hotchkiss Company and later at the American Ordnance Company.

== Personal life ==
Very married Margaret Freeman Zeilin, the daughter of Jacob Zeilin, the seventh Commandant of the Marine Corps. He died of pneumonia in 1910 in New York City.

== Publications ==
- Very, Edward Wilson (1875). Organization of the Naval Brigade. Washington, DC: U.S. Navy, Bureau of Ordnance.
- Very, Lieut. Edward W. (1880). Navies of the World. New York: J. Wiley and Sons.
- Very, Edward Wilson (1885). The Hotchkiss Revolving Canon. Descriptions and Illustrations of the Systems as Designed for Naval Service, Field Artillery and Flank Defence, Together with Firing Tables, Proving Ground Tests and Official Reports. Waterlow and sons.
- Very, Edward Wilson (1891). The Annapolis Armor Test. Annapolis, MD: United States Naval Institute.
