= Wurfgranate Patrone 326 =

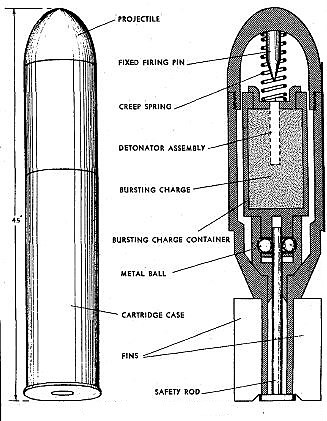
- A schematic of components.
- Type: Rifle grenade
- Place of origin: Germany

Service history
- Used by: Wehrmacht
- Wars: World War II

Specifications
- Mass: Cartridge: 120 g (4.2 oz); Grenade: 91 g (3.2 oz)
- Length: 110 mm (4.5 in)
- Diameter: 26 mm (1.0 in)
- Maximum firing range: 270 m (300 yd)
- Warhead: TNT
- Warhead weight: 7.1 g (.25 oz)
- Detonation mechanism: Nose fuze

The Wurfgranate Patrone 326 was a small grenade that was developed by Germany and used by the Wehrmacht during World War II. The Wurfgranate Patrone 326 was designed to be fired from a Leuchtpistole or flare gun in English.

== Design ==
The Wurfgranate Patrone 326 could be fired from the Leuchtpistole 34, Leuchtpistole 42, or Sturmpistole giving German troops a small and lightweight grenade launcher for engaging targets from close range which could not be engaged satisfactorily by infantry weapons or artillery without endangering friendly troops. It was not recommended for use beyond 180 m (200 yd) due to inaccuracy or less than 46 m (50 yd) due to the risk from shell fragments.

The Wurfgranate Patrone 326 consisted of a rounded metallic nose cap with a firing pin inside of a creep spring that screwed into a cylindrical metallic body. Inside the body was an inner case which held the detonator, TNT bursting charge, and safety rod. The base of the grenade had four tail fins for stabilization and the tail of the grenade fit inside a crimped brass or aluminum cartridge case which contained propellant. The cartridge case prevented the inner case from moving forward before firing by the safety rod which was held in place by two metallic balls at the rear and the creep spring at the front. When fired the projectile was pushed out of its case and after approximately 9–11 m (10–12 yd) the safety rod fell away arming the grenade. Upon hitting the target the inner case slid forward and compressed the creep spring allowing the firing pin to ignite the detonator which in turn ignited the TNT.

Handling instructions from Tactical And Technical Trends, Nos. 21-30 by the United States Department of War advised users of a captured Leuchtpistole loaded with a Wurfgranate Patrone 326 or similar munitions to:

1. Never fire a cartridge with a loose projectile.
2. Never extract the projectile from the cartridge case, since this would cause the safety rod to fall out arming the grenade. A slight jar might cause it to detonate.
3. If the cartridge becomes jammed in the barrel never pull the cartridge case out of the breech. Instead gently push the round out of the barrel from the muzzle and out the breech.
