= USS Zeilin (DD-313) =

Clemson-class destroyer

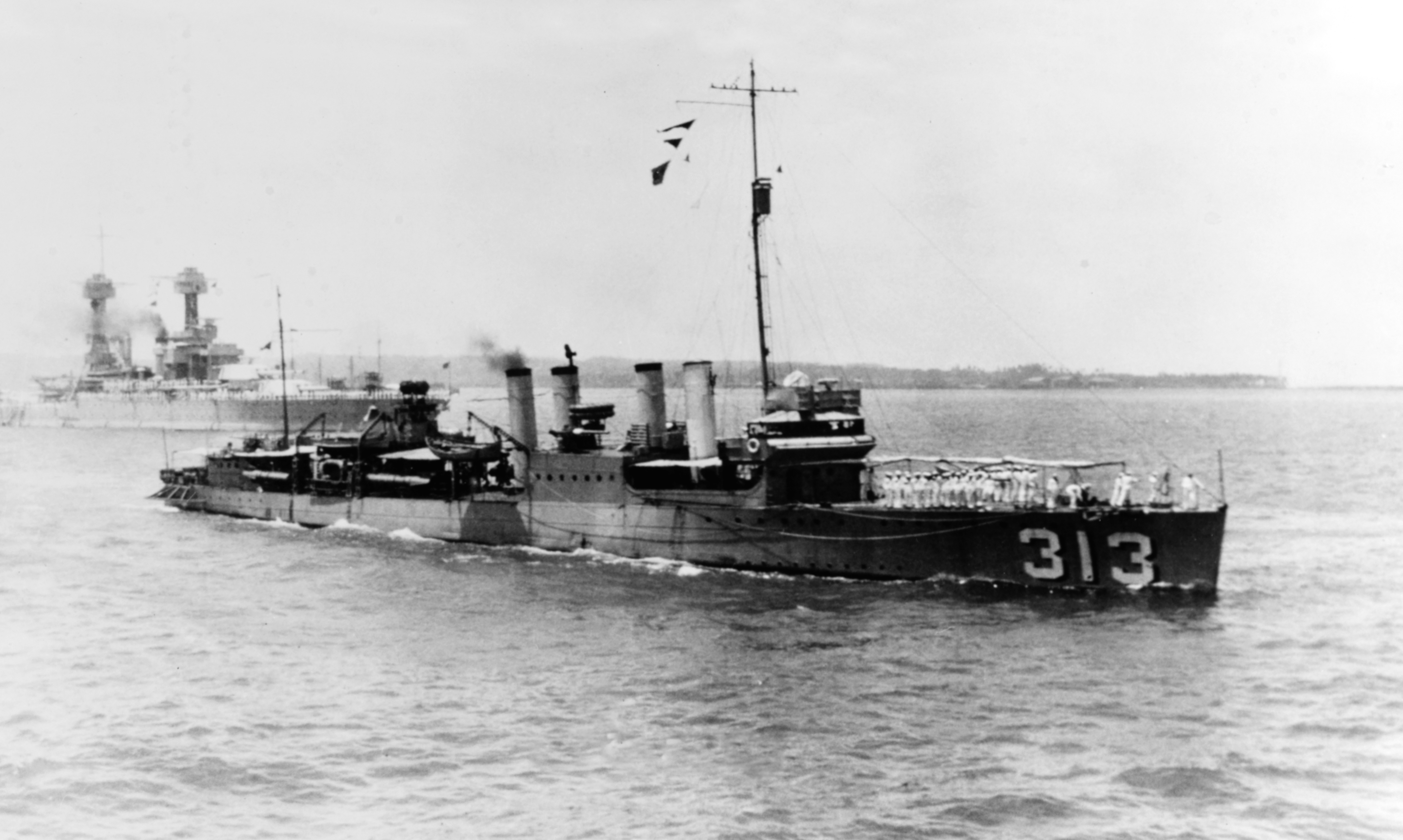

History

United States
- Namesake: Jacob Zeilin
- Builder: Bethlehem Shipbuilding Corporation, Union Iron Works, San Francisco
- Laid down: 20 February 1919
- Launched: 28 May 1919
- Commissioned: 10 December 1920
- Decommissioned: 22 January 1930
- Stricken: 8 July 1930
- Fate: Sold for scrapping, 1930

General characteristics
- Class & type: Clemson-class destroyer
- Displacement: 1,290 long tons (1,311 t) (standard); 1,389 long tons (1,411 t) (deep load)
- Length: 314 ft 4 in (95.8 m)
- Beam: 30 ft 11 in (9.42 m)
- Draught: 10 ft 3 in (3.1 m)
- Installed power: 27,000 shp (20,000 kW); 4 water-tube boilers
- Propulsion: 2 shafts, 2 steam turbines
- Speed: 35 knots (65 km/h; 40 mph) (design)
- Range: 2,500 nautical miles (4,600 km; 2,900 mi) at 20 knots (37 km/h; 23 mph) (design)
- Complement: 6 officers, 108 enlisted men
- Armament: 4 × single 4-inch (102 mm) guns; 2 × single 1-pounder AA guns or; 2 × single 3-inch (76 mm) guns; 4 × triple 21 inch (533 mm) torpedo tubes; 2 × depth charge rails

USS Zeilin (DD-313) was a Clemson-class destroyer in service with the United States Navy from 1920 to 1930. She was scrapped in 1930.

== Description ==
The Clemson class was a repeat of the preceding Wickes class although more fuel capacity was added. The ships displaced 1,290 long tons (1,311 t) at standard load and 1,389 long tons (1,411 t) at deep load. They had an overall length of 314 feet 4 inches (95.8 m), a beam of 30 feet 11 inches (9.4 m) and a draught of 10 feet 3 inches (3.1 m). They had a crew of 6 officers and 108 enlisted men.

Performance differed radically between the ships of the class, often due to poor workmanship. The Clemson class was powered by two steam turbines, each driving one propeller shaft, using steam provided by four water-tube boilers. The turbines were designed to produce a total of 27,000 shaft horsepower (20,000 kW) intended to reach a speed of 35 knots (65 km/h; 40 mph). The ships carried a maximum of 371 long tons (377 t) of fuel oil which was intended gave them a range of 2,500 nautical miles (4,600 km; 2,900 mi) at 20 knots (37 km/h; 23 mph).

The ships were armed with four 4-inch (102 mm) guns in single mounts and were fitted with two 1-pounder guns for anti-aircraft defense. In many ships a shortage of 1-pounders caused them to be replaced by 3-inch (76 mm) guns. Their primary weapon, though, was their torpedo battery of a dozen 21 inch (533 mm) torpedo tubes in four triple mounts. They also carried a pair of depth charge rails. A "Y-gun" depth charge thrower was added to many ships.

== Construction and career ==
Zeilin, named for Jacob Zeilin, was laid down on 20 February 1919 at the Bethlehem Shipbuilding Corporation yard in San Francisco, California; launched on 28 May 1919; sponsored by Mrs. William P. Lindley; and commissioned on 10 December 1920 at the Mare Island Navy Yard.

Following shakedown, Zeilin reported for duty with Division 33, Squadron 11, Destroyers, Battle Force, based at San Diego, California. For the next nine years, she operated out of that port, conducting maneuvers with the fleet and training with independent ships. On July 27, 1923, she suffered serious damage in a collision in fog in Puget Sound with transport Henderson (AP-1), bringing President Harding to Seattle. After repairs, she resumed duty with the Battle Force Destroyers.

On 22 January 1930, Zeilin was decommissioned at San Diego. Her name was struck from the Navy list on 8 July 1930, and she was subsequently scrapped by the Navy.

Short footage of her in action appears in the opening sequence of the 1935 film Miss Pacific Fleet.
