= Flare gun =

Firearm that launches flares

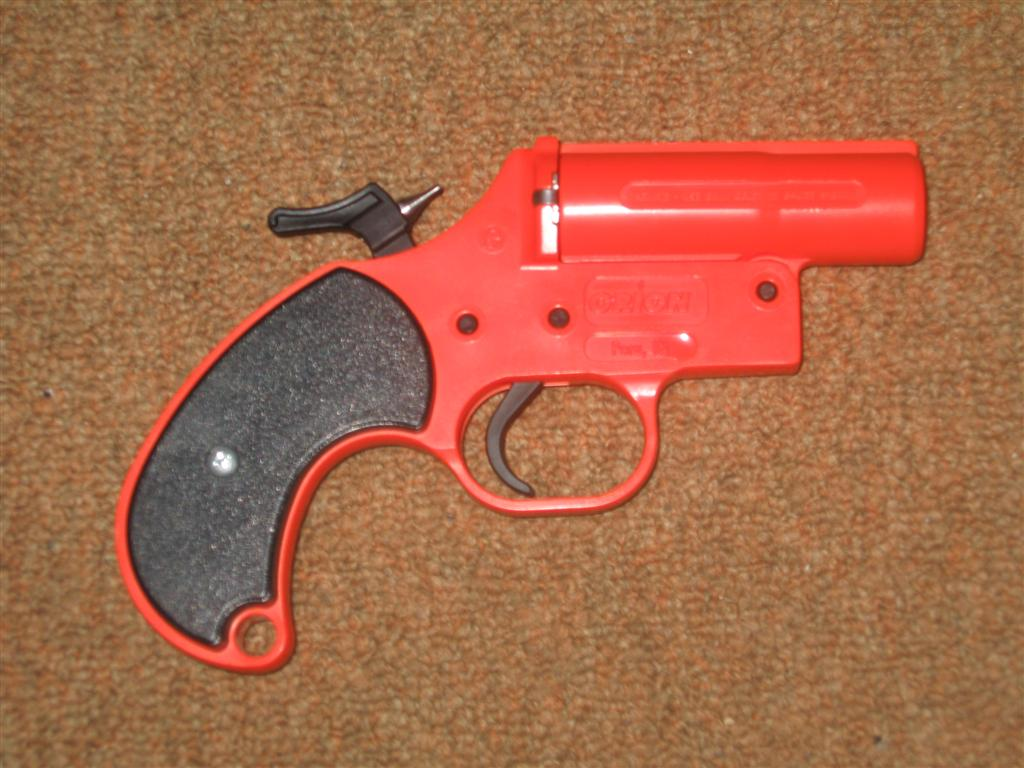
An Orion-brand single-shot, breech-loaded, 12 gauge flare gun. Its design is typical of commercially available flare guns, with a high-visibility red casing.

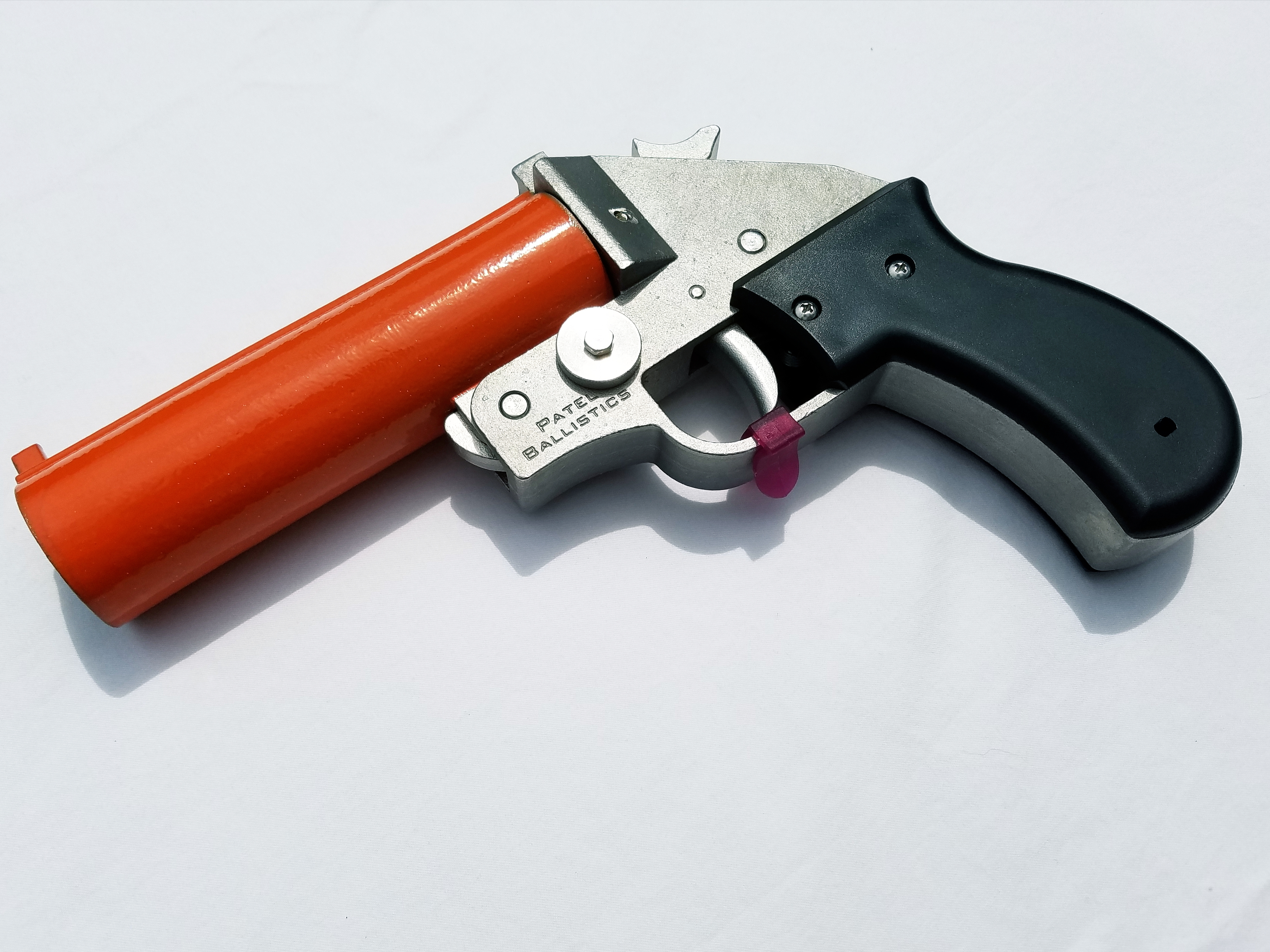
A single-shot, 26.5/25 mm flare gun manufactured by Patel Ballistics. It is chambered in a different caliber from the Orion flare gun.

A flare gun, also known as a Very pistol (sometimes spelled Verey) or signal pistol, is a large-bore handgun that discharges flares, blanks and smoke. Today, a flare gun is typically used to produce a distress signal.

== Types ==
The most common type of flare gun is a Very (sometimes spelled Verey), which was named after Edward Wilson Very (1847–1910), an American naval officer who developed and popularized a single-shot breech-loading snub-nosed pistol that fired flares ("Very lights"). They have a single action trigger mechanism, hammer action, and a center fire pin. Modern varieties are frequently made out of durable plastic of a bright colour that makes them more conspicuous and easier to retrieve in an emergency and assists in distinguishing them from conventional firearms.

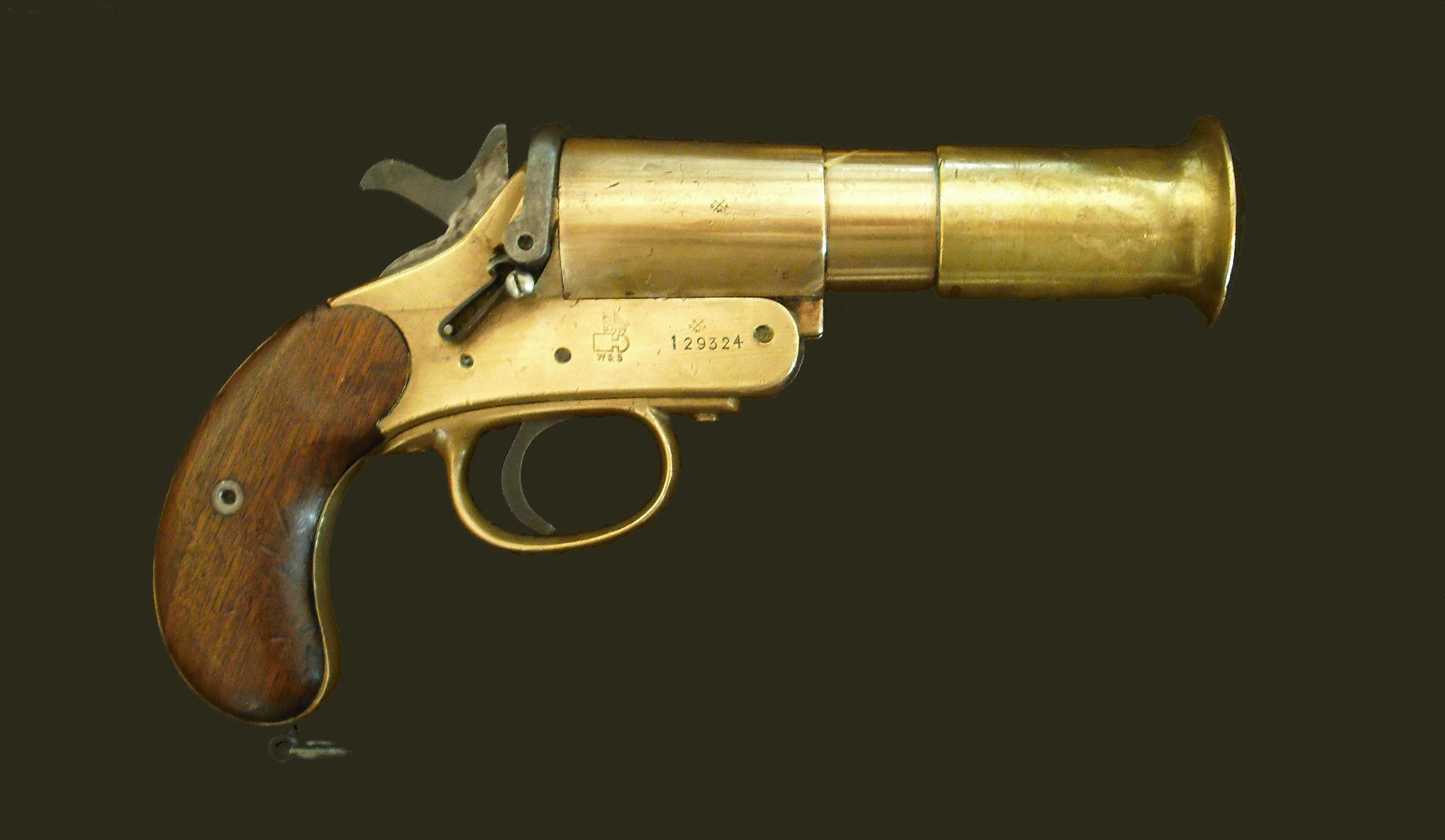
British 1" calibre Very pistol used in World War I

The Very pistol, typical of the type used in the Second World War, have a bore diameter of 1.04 inches (26.5 mm), commonly referred to as a "one inch bore" for short, now known as "Calibre 4" for signal pistols. These are still available and more recent longer-barrel models can also fire parachute flares. Many newer models fire smaller 12-gauge (18.5 mm) flares. In countries where possession of firearms is strictly controlled, such as the United Kingdom, the use of Very pistols as emergency equipment on boats is less common than, for example, the United States; in the U.K. flare guns are regulated as a firearm and require a firearms license, which are typically only granted to masters of larger vessels and harbormasters. In such locations, distress flares are more commonly fired from single-shot tube devices which are then disposed of after use. These devices are fired by twisting or striking a pad on one end, but the contents are otherwise similar to a round from a flare gun, although the flares themselves are much larger and can burn brighter for longer. In the Russian Federation, which also has strict controls on firearms, a special tube-shaped flare launching device called a "Hunter's Signal" (Сигнал Охотника) is available. This is reusable but is deliberately designed in a way to avoid resemblance to a gun.

Flare guns may be used whenever someone needs to send a distress signal. The flares must be shot directly above, making the signal visible for a longer period of time and revealing the position of whoever is in need of assistance. There are four distinct flare calibers: 12-gauge (18.53 mm), 25 mm, 26.5 mm, and 37 mm – the first three being the most popular for boaters.

== Use as weapons ==
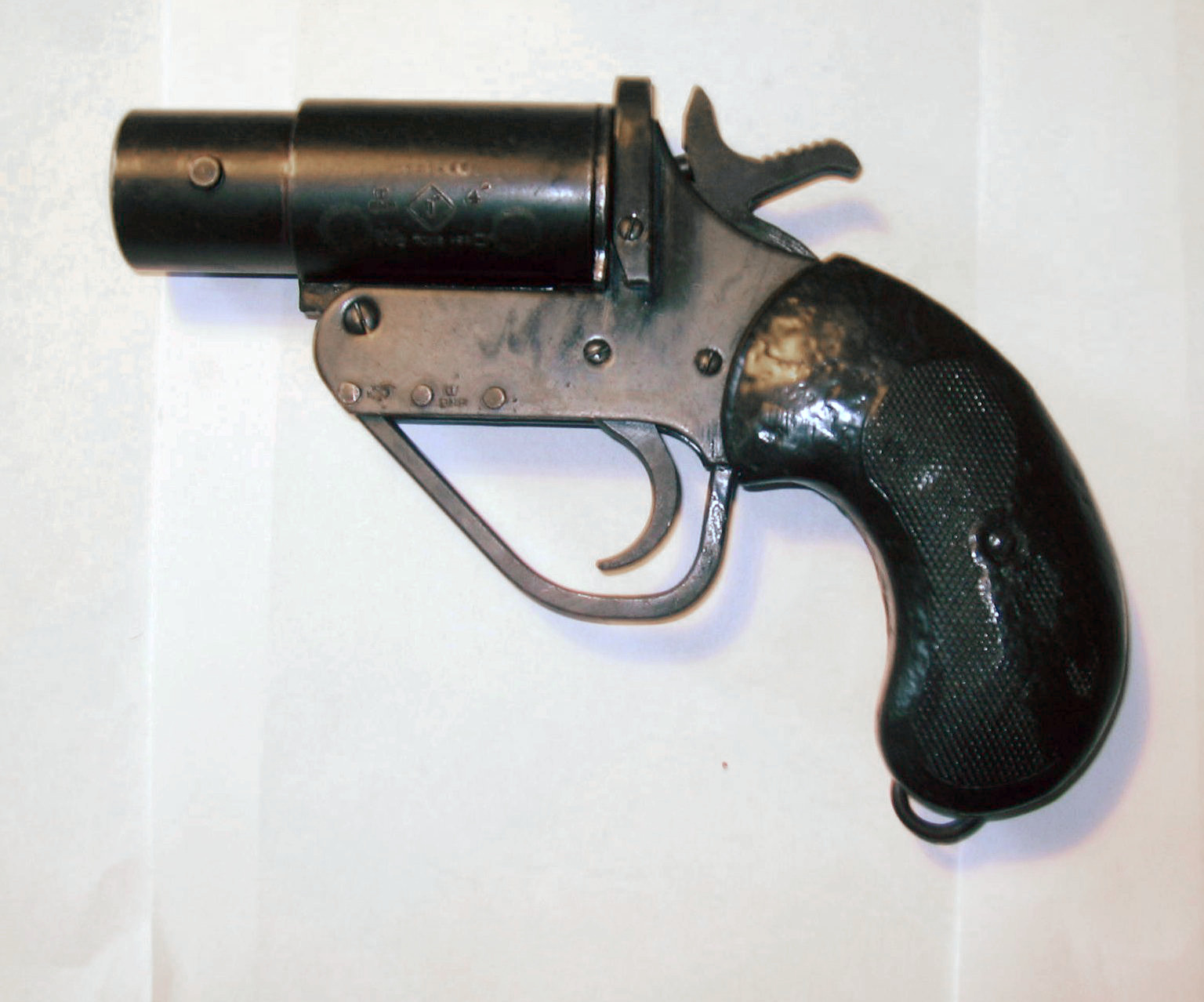
A Molins No.2 Mk.5, 1-inch calibre Very pistol, c. 1940, made by I.L. Berridge Ltd.

Flare guns may be used for the destruction of inflammable material, or in an anti-personnel role.

=== Pocket mortars ===
In World War II, Germany manufactured grenades designed to be fired from adapted flare guns known as the Sturmpistole in its final form. Fragmentation rounds and anti-tank HEAT warheads were produced for the pistol, however the latter only had 80 mm of penetration (RHA) requiring it to be either fired on lightly armoured targets or used on the sides and rears of heavily armoured targets such as the late-war tanks that were beginning to enter service.

The Soviets developed the Baranov pocket mortar during 1943, which fired a 175 g round with an 8 g explosive charge out to a range of 200-350 m (it was also proposed to increase this to 600-700 m). A later development was the PSA/PSA-1/ASP, a copy of the US issue M8 flare pistol. This fired an experimental grenade which was 40% more powerful than that used with the Kampfpistole.

=== Conversion kits ===
Conversion kits are available intended to convert flare guns to accept conventional ammunition by use of barrel inserts. There are also 12 gauge inserts intended to allow use of rifle or pistol ammunition in conventional 12 gauge shotguns. Use of any of these devices in the Orion plastic 12 gauge flare gun is not recommended by the manufacturer and ATF tests have demonstrated that sometimes a single use results in a catastrophic failure. In the United States, if these conversion kits are used in a metal flare gun, the converted gun is considered to be a firearm by the ATF. If a rifled barrel insert is used, the converted firearm is classified as a pistol; if a smoothbore barrel insert is used, the converted firearm is classified as an AOW subject to the additional requirements of the NFA. Flare cartridges are low pressure compared to conventional ammunition and even metal flare guns are not designed or intended to be used with conventional ammunition. Conversion of a flare gun to fire conventional ammunition may also be restricted by local improvised firearm laws.

== See also ==
- 37 mm flare
